= List of T-ara live performances =

T-ara live performances
- T-ara performing in 2017
- Tours: 7
- One-off concerts: 21
- Award shows: 24
- Festivals: 63
- Joint tours and concerts: 86
- Guest performances: 5
- TV Shows & Specials: 192
- Fan meetings: 22
- Comeback showcases: 3
- Radio shows: 2

South Korean girl group T-ara has held six tours since its debut in 2009, five of which were in Japan. X'mas Premium Live was a three-day promotional mini-live tour promoting the group's first and second Japanese singles, "Bo Peep Bo Peep" and "Yayaya". The Osaka concert was recorded and later released on the Diamond Edition of T-ara's first Japanese album Jewelry Box. The success of Jewelry Box allowed the group to embark on their first Japan tour, with the final show of the tour marking T-ara as the first South Korean girl group to ever perform at Nippon Budokan with over 20,000 attendees. They would later return to Nippon Budokan on their second Japanese tour in support of their second Japanese album Treasure Box. The T-ara Great China Tour kicked off in Shanghai in December 2014 and concluded in the same city in September 2016. The tour marked T-ara's first concerts in Hefei and Nanjing.

== Concert tours ==
=== Headlining ===
Year	Title	Associated work(s)	Duration	Shows
2012	T-ara Japan Tour 2012: Jewelry Box	Jewelry Box	June 19, 2012 – July 26, 2012 (Japan)	11
2013	T-ara Japan Tour 2013: Treasure Box	Treasure Box	July 12, 2013 – September 27, 2013 (Japan)	9
2014–2016	T-ara Great China Tour	And & End & So Good	November 25, 2014 – September 17, 2016 (China)	5

=== Promotional showcases ===
Year	Title	Associated work(s)	Duration	Shows	Attendance	Ref.
2011	T-ara Japan Debut Mini-Live	Bo Peep Bo Peep	September 29, 2011 – October 1, 2011 (Japan)	4	36,000	
2011	T-ara X'mas Premium Live	Yayaya	December 20, 2011 – December 22, 2011 (Japan)	3	—	
2012	~Sexy Love~ Premium Showcase Tour	Sexy Love	November 11, 2012 – November 18, 2012 (Japan)	6	—	
2013	Bunny Style! Special Showcase Tour	Bunny Style!	February 20, 2013 – March 9, 2013 (Japan)	14	100,000	

=== Cancelled ===
In September 2014, MBK Entertainment announced that T-ara would be touring Japan for the 3rd time with a concert tour in support of their third Japanese album "Gossip Girls". Over 2,000 tickets were sold to fanclub members before going on sale online. However, the agency quickly cancelled the tour after being scammed by the organizer who embezzled around 200 million KRW (~US$174,000) which he received from the former label's president. The scammer was caught 2 years later in 2015.

== One-off concerts ==
Date	Name	City	Country	Venue	Attendance	Ref.
June 3, 2010	TTL Mini Live	Yokohama	Japan	Yokohama Britz Hall	1,000	
On June 3, 2010, T-ara a mini concert in Japan. The event was sponsored by Gusto, a Japanese restaurant chain with approximately 2,000 stores in the country. T-ara was modeling for the store at the time. Although 130,000 fans applied for attendance, only 1,000 were selected to attend.
July 5, 2011	T-ara First Live In Japan	Tokyo	Japan	Shibuya-AX	1,800	
T-ara held its first showcase in Japan on July 5, 2011. It was reported that there were 100,000 applicants for the showcase, however, due to the exclusivity of the event, only 1,800 fans were chosen to attend. Over 500 reporters and broadcasting companies attended the event. It was broadcast in 3D and 2D through Sky Perfect TV, Japan's largest satellite broadcaster, and Fuji TV's Next Channel. Following the showcase, CCM announced that it will receive a nationwide 3D screening in Japan by Warner production which operates 498 screens nationwide.
June 3, 2012	First Lovey Dovey Roly Poly Live	Bangkok	Thailand	BITEC Event Hall 105	7,800	
"First Lovey Dovey Roly Poly Live" was T-ara's first and only concert in Thailand. It was part of the group's three-country concert series along with their first concert in South Korea and their tour's last in Japan. All 7,800 seats were reported to be sold out.
September 18, 2012	T-ara First Showcase in Hong Kong	Hong Kong		HKCEC Star Hall	3,000	
The showcase was announced by CCM entertainment in the beginning of the year. It was confirmed to be sold-out by the event's organizers who suggested that T-ara have a large-scale concert next time. It was reported that over 500 fans who were unable to get tickets showed up in front of the venue as well. The group also received a guarantee of 700 million Won, the highest figure given to a Korean artist of all time in the territory.
October 3, 2012	T-ara Showcase in Kuala Lumpur	Kuala Lumpur	Malaysia	Dewan Wawasan Convention Center	5,300	
On October 3, 2012, T-ara held their first and only concert in Malaysia. The showcase was quickly sold out which caused organizers to increase seat count to the venue's maximum capacity. A press conference was held for the concert where T-ara received a popularity award by DIGI Network for their single "Sexy Love".
October 19, 2012	~Time To Love~ Mini Live	Tokyo	Japan	Tokyo International Forum Hall A	—	
December 24, 2012	DX'mas Party with T-ara	Tokyo	Japan	Shinagawa Intercity Hall	500	
On December 24, 2012, T-ara held a special promotional concert for PACHINKO, an arcade game they were endorsing at the time. The mini-concert coincided the release of the game's new product "CRA Deluxe Sea Story with T-ara". Only 500 fans were selected to attend the premium event.
August 10, 2013	It's T-ara Time 2013 in Hong Kong	Hong Kong		AsiaWorld–Arena	8,000	
September 21, 2013	T-ara, Davichi, Speed Concert in Mongolia	Ulaanbaatar	Mongolia	National Sports Stadium	20,000	
Core Contents Media artists T-ara, Davichi, Speed and SeeYa held a concert at the National Sports Stadium in Ulaanbaatar, Mongolia in front of 20,000 fans. The concert was broadcast live by ETV.
November 9, 2013	T-ara Showcase in Beijing	Beijing	China	Workers Indoor Arena	—	
November 25, 2013	T-ara Live Arch	Tokyo	Japan	Shibuya Hikarie Hall	—	
November 27, 2013	T-ara Live Arch	Tokyo	Japan	Shibuya Hikarie Hall	—	
December 21, 2013	T-ara's on Air in Guangzhou	Guangzhou	China	Tianhe Gymnasium	3,000	
January 19, 2014	T-ara's on Air in Chengdu	Chengdu	China	Sichuan International Tennis Center	—	
February 14, 2014	T-ara & Speed Concert In Phnom Penh	Phnom Penh	Cambodia	Koh Pich Theater	3,000	
December 25, 2014	Dear My Family	Seoul	South Korea	COEX Auditorium	2,000	
"Dear My Family" is T-ara's first and only solo concert in South Korea. Two performances were held at the COEX Auditorium on December 25.
February 6, 2015	T-ara Tencent Exclusive Live	Gangwon	South Korea	Oak Valley Snow Park / Tencent	1,200,000 (online)	
May 21, 2016	T-ara & M.I.C. FPlus 52 Mini Concert	Beijing	China	Huiyuan Space	—	
September 11, 2016	T-ara Premium Live in Japan	Tokyo	Japan	Tokyo Dome City Hall	—	
May 13, 2017	T-ara Live in Taipei	Taipei	Taiwan	NTU Sports Center	2,600	
T-ara Live in Taipei is T-ara's first concert in Taiwan and their last as six members. The concert sold-out about a week prior to the performance. On the day of the event, 1,200 local fans flocked Taipei International Airport following the group's arrival.
November 4, 2017	T-ara Vietnam Concert 2017	Ho Chi Minh City	Vietnam	Phú Thọ Indoor Stadium	—	
September 12, 2025	Re:verse Concert	Ulaanbaatar	Mongolia	National Sports Stadium	—	

=== Cancelled concerts ===
==== Power & Beauty Concert in San Francisco ====
On April 13, 2012, T-ara was supposed to hold a concert in the United States with Davichi and Yangpa, titled "Power & Beauty in San Francisco". Marketed as the "first major K-pop concert in Northern California", and with around 8,000 tickets sold, it was officially announced sold-out by the organizing agency Namu Entertainment with a possibility of adding additional seats. However, the concert was postponed and later cancelled due to visas not being prepared four days before the event. Namu Entertainment later sued Core Contents Media blaming the agency for not taking precautions and not preparing visas in time.

==== Jewelry Box – First Korea Concert ====
T-ara was scheduled to hold their ever Korean concert in Seoul on August 11, 2012, at the Jamsil Arena. Core Contents Media announced that the concert was sold-out with over 6,000 tickets sold for Korean fans only, as the agency refused T-ara's Japanese and Chinese fanclubs' requests for additional 4,000 seats. The concert was supposed to be the final stop in the Asian tour Jewelry Box, starting from the T-ara Japan Tour 2012: Jewelry Box in Japan, then First Lovey Dovey Roly Poly Live in Thailand and finishing with Jewelry Box - First Korea Concert in South Korea. However, due to the group's bullying controversy, the concert was postponed and later cancelled 10 days before the event.

==== T-ara Live in Macau ====
T-ara was supposed to perform their last concert with their former agency MBK Entertainment in Macau on May 20, 2017. It would've also marked the group's first ever concert in the territory. However, due to the conflict between the agency and members Boram and Soyeon which resulted in their departure from the agency, the concert was postponed and later cancelled by the organizing agency YS Entertainment. Fans expressed their disapproval of the company's actions towards the members and the loss of their already paid-tickets by protesting in front the venue the day of the event.

== Comeback showcases ==
Date	Album	City	Country	Venue	Ref.
August 3, 2015	So Good	Seoul	South Korea	Ilji Art Hall	
November 9, 2016	Remember	Seoul	South Korea	BLUE SQUARE Samsung Card Hall	
June 14, 2017	What's My Name?	Seoul	South Korea	Shinhan Fan Card Hall	

== Fan meetings ==
Title	Date	Country	City	Venue	Attendance	Ref.
T-ara Taiwan Fan meeting with TONY MOLY	December 13, 2011	Taiwan	Taipei	Tony Moly Store	2,000	
On December 13, 2011, T-ara made a surprise fan meeting in Taiwan. Although the group only stayed for 20 hours, they attracted the attention of local media outlets who attended the event. The meeting was hosted by Tony Moly, a cosmetics brand which T-ara was endorsing at the time. Reportedly, about 500 fans flocked the airport to meet the group. The brand spent over NT$2,000,000 to invite the group.
Queen's First Fanmeeting	July 4, 2012	South Korea	Seoul	Kyung Hee University	3,200	
The fan meeting took place on the evening of July 14, 2012 just after the press conference of the event at the Grand Peace Hall in Kyunghee University; this marked T-ara's first fanmeeting celebrating their fanclub opening. The event was hosted by Jang Dong-hyuk. Dani, a female trainee who was supposed to debut in T-ara attended the fanmeeting as a guest and marked her initiation into the group.
"Treasure Island"	December 25–26, 2012 (Note: Also named "X'mas Partywith T-ara".)	Japan	Tokyo	Tokyo Dome City Hall	6,000	
"Treasure Island"	December 27, 2012	Japan	Osaka	Zepp Osaka	—	
"Summer School"	July 13, 2014	Japan	Tokyo	Maihama Cinema	—	
"Summer School"	July 14, 2014	Japan	Osaka	Zepp Namba	—	
"Present"	December 12, 2014	South Korea	Seoul	Sangmyung Art Center	1,000	
"What Should I Do" (Note: Only Eun-jung, Jiyeon and Hyomin attended the event.)	March 7, 2016	Bangkok	Thailand	Aksra Theatre	—	
"Love Q"	January 10, 2015	Ho Chi Minh City	Vietnam	Lan Anh Stadium	3,000	
"Love Q" was T-ara' first fan meeting in Vietnam. Over 2,000 fans in yellow t-shirtswelcomed the group at the airport with a medley dance performance. The show reached 50% sold-out in pre-sales, and all 1,000 VIP tickets sold out entirely before the event.
"Again" ~ Special Fanmeeting	May 2, 2016	Japan	Tokyo	Differ Ariake Arena	5,000	
"Again" ~ Special Fanmeeting	May 5, 2016	Japan	Kobe	Kobe City Hall	5,000	
"T-ara Request Awards"	March 2, 2017	Japan	Saitama	Omiya Sonic City Hall	—	
"T-ara Request Awards"	March 3, 2017	Japan	Saitama	Omiya Sonic City Hall	—	
Bangkok First Mini-Fanmeeting	April 1, 2017	Thailand	Bangkok	M Theatre	—	
"Return of the Queen"	November 21, 2021	South Korea	Seoul	Universal Art Center	—	
The fanmeeting marked T-ara's first live performance in 4 years and its first as 4 members. The event was available for both offline and online fans, However, due to the COVID-19 pandemic, there were offline attendance restrictions.
"T-ara 15th Anniversary Fanmeeting"	October 7, 2024	Macau		Broadway Macau	—	
T-ara Vietnam 2024 Fan Meeting	November 23, 2024	Hanoi	Vietnam	K-Town Center	50	
T-ara held their first Vietnamese fan meeting in nearly a decade on November 23, 2024, ahead of their performance at the VINCOM Music Festival. The exclusive fan meeting was limited to 50 fans. The group's arrival in the city generated significant public attention, resulting in heavy traffic due to the large crowds that gathered at the airport and followed them to the venue.
"TIME TO TOGETHER" Special Fan Meeting In Hong Kong	December 20, 2025	Hong Kong		Axa Dreamland	—	
T-ara 2026 FanCon	February 7, 2026 (Note: Titled "Memories of Youth")	Ho Chi Minh City	Vietnam	Quân khu 7 Arena	—	
T-ara 2026 FanCon	March 21, 2026 (Note: Titled "Again in Chengdu")	Chengdu	China	Huaxi Live - 528 M Space	—	
T-ara 2026 FanCon	April 11, 2026 (Note: Titled "Again in Shanghai")	Shanghai	China	Echo Music Park	—	
T-ara 2026 FanCon	August 9, 2026 (Note: Titled "Summer Again")	Kuala Lumpur	Malaysia	Mega Star Arena	—	
T-ara 2026 FanCon	September 26, 2026 (Note: Titled "Moonlight Party")	Ho Chi Minh City	Vietnam	Saigon Exhibition and Convention Center	—	
T-ara 2026 FanCon	October 18, 2026 (Note: Titled "2026 FanCon in Taiwan")	Kaohsiung	Taiwan	Kaohsiung Music Center	—	

== Award shows ==
Date	Event	City	Region	Performed song(s)	Ref.
August 28, 2009	3rd Mnet 20s Choice Awards	Seoul	South Korea	Lies"; "Wanna Play?"	
October 18, 2009	4th Cyworld Digital Music Awards	Seoul	South Korea	Lies"; "TTL (Time to Love)"	
December 10, 2009	24th Golden Disc Awards	Seoul	South Korea	"Lies"; "Bo Beep Bo Peep"	
February 3, 2010	19th Seoul Music Awards	Seoul	South Korea	"Bo Peep Bo Peep"	
February 23, 2010	Seoul Culture and Arts Awards	Seoul	South Korea	"Like The First Time"	
August 26, 2010	4th Mnet 20s Choice Awards	Seoul	South Korea	"You Drive Me Crazy"; "Bo Beep Bo Peep"	
December 15, 2010	11th MelOn Music Awards	Seoul	South Korea	"You Drive Me Crazy"; "Waeroni"; "Yayaya"	
January 27, 2011	16th Coca-Cola Sports Awards	Seoul	South Korea	"Waeroni"; "Bo Beep Bo Peep"	
August 31, 2011	6th Seoul International Drama Awards	Seoul	South Korea	"Roly Poly"	
October 9, 2011	5th Gongju Youth International Film Festival Awards	Seoul	South Korea	"Roly Poly"; "You Drive Me Crazy"; "Waeroni"	
November 25, 2011	32nd Blue Dragon Film Awards	Seoul	South Korea	"Cry Cry"	
January 19, 2012	21st Seoul Music Awards	Seoul	South Korea	"Roly Poly"; "Lovey Dovey"	
February 22, 2012	1st Gaon Chart Music Awards	Seoul	South Korea	"Roly Poly"; "Lovey Dovey"	
March 3, 2012	3rd Billboard Japan Music Awards	Tokyo	Japan	"Roly Poly"	
December 12, 2012	31st Golden Glove Awards	Seoul	South Korea	"Lovey Dovey"	
December 14, 2012	13th MelOn Music Awards	Seoul	South Korea	"Sexy Love"; "Lovey Dovey"	
January 15, 2013	27th Golden Disc Awards	Kuala Lumpur	Malaysia	"Sexy Love"; "Lovey Dovey"; "Roly Poly"	
February 13, 2013	2nd Gaon Chart Music Awards	Seoul	South Korea	"Lovey Dovey"	
November 15, 2014	3rd APAN Star Awards	Seoul	South Korea	"Sugar Free"	
December 21, 2014	SBS Awards Festival	Seoul	South Korea	"Number Nine"; "Roly Poly"	
April 12, 2015	3rd YinYueTai V-Chart Awards	Beijing	China	"Sugar Free"	
June 6, 2015	Hong Kong Youth Music Awards	Hong Kong		"Sugar Free"; "Roly Poly"; "Number Nine"	
November 25, 2015	2015 Korean Center Awards	Seoul	South Korea	"Roly Poly"; "So Crazy"	
April 8, 2017	5th YinYueTai V-Chart Awards	Cotai	Macau	"Tiamo"	
September 20, 2017	Soribada Best K-Music Awards	Seoul	South Korea	What's My Name?	

== Festivals ==
Date	Event	City	Country	Performed song(s)	Ref.
August 12, 2009	Incheon Festival	Incheon	South Korea	Lies"	
November 5, 2009	46th National Jeonbuk Sports Festival	Jeonju	South Korea	Unknown	
December 29, 2009	SBS Music Festival	Seoul	South Korea	"Bo Peep Bo Peep"	
December 12, 2009	MBC Music Festival	Seoul	South Korea	"TTL Listen 2"	
September 12, 2010	Hallyu Dream Festival	Gyeongju	South Korea	"Bo Peep Bo Peep"; "You Drive Me Crazy"	
October 10, 2010	15th Busan International Film Festival (Opening Ceremony)	Busan	South Korea	Unknown	
October 30, 2010	18th Yeoncheon Paleolithic Festival	Yeoncheon	South Korea	"Bo Peep Bo Peep"; "You Drive Me Crazy"; "Like The First Time"; "I'm Really Hurt"	
October 24, 2010	Ulsan Youth Music Festival	Ulsan	South Korea	"TTL (Time to Love)"; "Good Person	
December 29, 2010	SBS Music Festival	Seoul	South Korea	"You Drive Me Crazy"; "Beautiful" (Note: Special stage with Beast)	
December 31, 2010	MBC Music Festival	Seoul	South Korea	"Honey"; "You Drive Me Crazy"; "Waeroni"	
May 5, 2011	19th Yeoncheon Paleolithic Festival	Yeoncheon	South Korea	"Bo Beep Bo Peep"; "You Drive Me Crazy"; "Waeroni"	
April 17, 2011	Korean Music Wave	Bangkok	Thailand	"You Drive Me Crazy"	
May 17, 2011	33rd Sangmun University Festival	Jinju	South Korea	"Bo Beep Bo Peep"; "You Drive Me Crazy"; "Like The First Time"; "Waeroni"; "Yayaya"	
July 26, 2011	Ulsan Summer Festival	Ulsan	South Korea	"Roly Poly"	
August 11, 2011	Korean Music Wave	Bangkok	Thailand	"Roly Poly"; "You Drive Me Crazy"	
August 15, 2011	3rd Incheon Hallyu Tourism Concert	Incheon	South Korea	"Roly Poly"	
October 3, 2011	2nd Hallyu Dream Festival	Gyeongju	South Korea	"Roly Poly"; "Waeroni"	
October 16, 2011	Jungnang Culture and Arts Festival (Opening Ceremony)	Seoul	South Korea	"Roly Poly"; "Bo Peep Bo Peep"; "You Drive Me Crazy"; "Waeroni"	
November 8, 2011	13th Korea China Music Festival	Shanghai	China	"Roly Poly"; "Bo Peep Bo Peep"	
December 29, 2011	SBS Music Festival	Seoul	South Korea	"Cry Cry" (Remix Ver.)	
December 30, 2011	KBS Song Festival	Seoul	South Korea	"Cry Cry"; "Roly Poly"; "Betrayal of The Rose" (Note: Uhm Jung-hwa (cover))	
December 31, 2011	MBC Music Festival	Seoul	South Korea	"Roly Poly"; "Black Cat" (Note: Cover)); "I'm Your Gir" (Note: S.E.S cover, with IU and f(x) Luna) (Jiyeon stage); "Now" (Note: Fin.K.L cover) (Hyomin and Soyeon stage)	
July 23, 2012	Ulsan Summer Festival	Ulsan	South Korea	"Day By Day"	
December 29, 2012	SBS Music Festival	Seoul	South Korea	"Sexy Love" (Remix Ver.)	
December 31, 2012	MBC Music Festival	Seoul	South Korea	"Sexy Love"; "Lovey Dovey"	
February 8, 2013	Anhui TV Spring Gala Festival	Hefei	China	"Roly Poly"; "Bo Beep Bo Peep"	
March 16, 2013	Korean Music Wave	Bangkok	Thailand	"Lovey Dovey"	
June 2, 2013	2013 Kumamato K-Pop Festival	Kumamoto	Japan	"Lovey Dovey"; "Jeon Won Diary"(T-ara N4)	
September 19, 2013	4th Incheon Korean Music Wave	Incheon	South Korea	"Lovey Dovey"; "Sexy Love"	
October 6, 2013	4th Hallyu Dream Festival	Gyeongju	South Korea	"Number Nine"	
October 13, 2013	Seoul Multicultural Festival	Seoul	South Korea	"Number Nine"; "I Know The Feeling"	
October 19, 2013	2013 UN World Peace Festival	Seoul	South Korea	"Number Nine"; "I Know The Feeling"	
December 29, 2013	SBS Music Festival	Seoul	South Korea	"Number Nine" (Remix Ver.)	
December 31, 2013	MBC Music Festival	Seoul	South Korea	"Number Nine"; "Do You Know Me?" (Remix Ver.)	
June 18, 2014	8th Love Garden Art Festival	Seoul	South Korea	"Roly Poly"; "Number Nine"; "Sexy Love"	
July 25, 2014	2nd Seoul Guro International Kids Film Festival	Seoul	South Korea	"Roly Poly"; "Bo Peep Bo Peep"	
September 1, 2014	6th Incheon Hallyu Tourism Concert	Incheon	South Korea	"Sugar Free"	
September 27, 2014	MBC Sky Festival	Seoul	South Korea	"Sugar Free"	
September 28, 2014	5th Hallyu Dream Festival	Gyeongju	South Korea	"Sugar Free"; "Number Nine"; Silla's Moonlight" (Note: Hyun In cover)(Soyeon solo)	
October 3, 2014	22nd Yeoncheon Paleolithic Festival	Yeoncheon	South Korea	"Number Nine"; "Roly Poly"	
October 4, 2014	Daegu International Fashion Culture Festival	Daegu	South Korea	"Sugar Free"	
December 23, 2014	Winter K-Pop Festival	Seoul	South Korea	"Sugar Free"	
December 31, 2014	MBC Music Festival	Seoul	South Korea	"Sugar Free"; "That Dance In The Rhythm" (Note: Kim Wan-sun cover)	
February 19, 2015	Hunan TV Spring Festival Gala	Beijing	China	"Little Apple"; "Sexy Love"	
May 5, 2015	25th South Korea Children's Festival	Seoul	South Korea	"Roly Poly"; "Sugar Free"	
August 4, 2015	Summer Kpop Festival	Seoul	South Korea	"So Crazy"; "Candy In My Ear" (Jiyeon solo)	
August 9, 2015	Sokcho Music Festival	Sokcho	South Korea	"So Crazy"	
October 4, 2015	6th Hallyu Dream Festival	Gyeongju	South Korea	"So Crazy"	
October 16, 2015	96th Korea National Sports Festival (Opening Ceremony)	Gangneung	South Korea	"So Crazy"	
October 31, 2015	2015 Asia Cultural Festival	Seoul	South Korea	"Number Nine"; "So Crazy"	
December 13, 2015	CCTV Spring Festival Gala	Shanghai	China	"So Crazy" (Chinese Ver.); "Sexy Love"; "Little Apple"; "Bo Peep Bo peep"	
December 27, 2015	SBS Music Festival	Seoul	South Korea	"Roly Poly"; "So Crazy"; "Lovey Dovey"	
January 14, 2016	CCTV Spring Festival Gala	Shanghai	China	"Roly Poly"; Cover Medley	
February 8, 2016	BTV Spring Festival Gala	Beijing	China	"Lovey Dovey"	
May 24, 2016	Shanghai Kpop & Supermodel Festival	Shanghai	China	"Roly Poly"; "Bo Peep Bo Peep"; "Number Nine"; "Sexy Love"; "So Crazy"; "Like The First Time"; "Waeroni"; "I'm OK"	
June 18, 2016	China-Korea Cultural Festival	Yancheng	China	"Roly Poly"; "Bo Peep Bo Peep"; "Number Nine"	
August 6, 2016	Shanghai Asia Music Festival	Shanghai	China	"Roly Poly"; "Sugar Free"; "Bo Peep Bo peep"; "Number Nine"; "So Crazy"	
October 1, 2016	Busan One Asia Festival	Busan	South Korea	"Number Nine"; "Sugar Free"	
October 4, 2016	Busan One Asia Festival	Busan	South Korea	"Why We Separated"; "Number Nine"; "Sugar Free"; "Bo Peep Bo peep"; "Roly Poly"; "Sexy Love"; "Falling U	
July 30, 2017	35th Daily Sports Grand Prize Festival	Seoul	South Korea	"Roly Poly"; "What's My Name?"	
October 9, 2017	9th Incheon Hallyu Tourism Concert	Incheon	South Korea	"Lovey Dovey"; "Roly Poly"; "What's My Name?"	
November 23, 2024	VINCOM Music Festival	Hanoi	Vietnam	"Bo Peep Bo peep"; "Sexy Love"; "Roly Poly"	
December 25, 2026	SBS Music Festival	Seoul	South Korea	-	

== Joint tours and concerts ==
Date	Event	City	Country	Performed song(s)	Ref.
August 21, 2009	Sound-sharing concert	Seoul	South Korea		
August 25, 2009	M! Super Concert	Seoul	South Korea	"Lies"	
September 20, 2009	Open Concert	Seoul	South Korea		
October 10, 2009	15th Dream Concert	Seoul	South Korea	"Lies"; "TTL Listen 2"	
November 1, 2009	KBS Joy 3rd Anniversary Concert	Seoul	South Korea	"Lies"; "Wanna Play?"	
November 15, 2009	Open Concert	Seoul	South Korea		
December 27, 2009	Open Concert	Seoul	South Korea		
February 7, 2010	2009–10 V-League (Opening ceremony)	Seoul	South Korea		
May 22, 2010	16th Dream Concert	Seoul	South Korea		
October 14, 2010	Blue House 2010 Republic of Korea Children's Day	Seoul	South Korea		
December 11, 2010	Lotte World Concert	Seoul	South Korea		
December 12, 2010	Gangnam Severance Hospital Special Live	Seoul	South Korea		
January 30, 2010	Open Concert	Seoul	South Korea		
July 25, 2010	Hip Hop Global Live	Seoul	South Korea		
August 20, 2010	Brand New Concert	Seoul	South Korea		
October 1, 2010	Armed Forces Broadcasting	Seoul	South Korea	"I'm Really Hurt"	
October 5, 2010	15th Yeonsu Citizens' Day Commemoration Ceremony	Seoul	South Korea	"Bo Peep Bo peep"; "You Drive Me Crazy"; "I'm Really Hurt"	
October 15, 2010	2010 Peace Concert	Seoul	South Korea	"Bo Peep Bo peep"; "You Drive Me Crazy"; "I'm Really Hurt"	
November 6, 2010	The Big 4 Concert	Seoul	South Korea	"Bo Peep Bo peep"; "You Drive Me Crazy"; "Like The First Time"; "Lies"; "I'm Really Hurt"	
November 20, 2010	Brighten Your Future Concert	Seoul	South Korea	"Bo Peep Bo peep"; "You Drive Me Crazy"; "Like The First Time"; "I'm Really Hurt"	
December 12, 2010	Yonsei University's 100th Anniversary Celebration	Seoul	South Korea	"Bo Peep Bo peep"; "You Drive Me Crazy"; "Waeroni"; "Yayaya"; "I'm Really Hurt"	
December 24, 2010	Music Bank Special Concert	Seoul	South Korea	"Yayaya"	
December 26, 2010	Open Concert	Seoul	South Korea	"Like An Indian Girl" (Note: Nami cover)	
January 16, 2011	Open Concert	Seoul	South Korea	"Roly Poly"; "You Drive Me Crazy"	
January 30, 2011	Open Concert	Seoul	South Korea	"Waeroni"	
February 24, 2011	Changwon 69th Anniversary Concert	Seoul	South Korea	"Bo Peep Bo peep"; "Waeroni"	
March 2, 2011	F1 Korean Grand Prix (Opening Ceremony)	Seoul	South Korea	"Waeroni"	
March 27, 2011	Lotte Giants Ceremony	Seoul	South Korea	"Waeroni"	
May 28, 2011	17th Dream Concert	Seoul	South Korea		
June 4, 2011	K-pop Heal The World Concert	Tampines	Singapore	"You Drive Me Crazy"; "Like The First Time"; "Bo Peep Bo peep"	
June 7, 2011	Osaka Heart Concert	Osaka	Japan	"Waeroni"	
July 5, 2011	2011 Hope Concert	Seoul	South Korea	"Roly Poly"	
August 7, 2011	2011 Beautiful Conert	Seoul	South Korea	"Roly Poly"	
September 3, 2011	13th Tokyo Girls Collection 2011 Autumn/Winter	Saitama	Japan	"Bo peep Bo Peep"	
September 11, 2011	Kansai Collection 2011 Autumn-Winter	Osaka	Japan	"Cry Cry"; "Roly Poly"	
September 11, 2011	Open Concert	Seoul	South Korea	"Roly Poly In Copacabana"; "You Drive Me Crazy"	
September 18, 2011	Open Concert	Seoul	South Korea	"Waeroni"	
October 10, 2011	5th MBC Power Concert	Seoul	South Korea		
October 2, 2011	Incheon Coast Fall Concert	Incheon	South Korea	"Roly Poly"; "You Drive Me Crazy"	
October 28, 2011	2011 K-pop Super Concert	Busan	South Korea	"Roly Poly"	
October 30, 2012	Open Concert	Seoul	South Korea	"Round & Round"	
November 6, 2011	Love-Sharing Concert	Seoul	South Korea		
November 11, 2011	2011 Super K-Pop Concert	Busan	South Korea		
November 12, 2011	Love Jeju Island Concert	Jeju City	South Korea	"Roly Poly"	
January 27, 2012	Korea-Japan Exchange Fashion Show	Tokyo	Japan		
February 8, 2012	Music Bank World Tour	Paris	France	Song Medley; "Lovey Dovey" "; Waeroni"	
March 11, 2012	2012 K-collection Concert	Seoul	South Korea		
May 12, 2012	18th Dream Concert	Seoul	South Korea	"Roly Poly"; "Lovey Dovey"	
July 10, 2012	2012 Beautiful Concert	Seoul	South Korea	"Day By Day"; "Roly Poly"	
July 17, 2012	Open Concert	Seoul	South Korea		
July 28, 2012	2012 London Olympic Concert	Seoul	South Korea	"Day By Day"	
September 8, 2012	2012 World Conservation Congress concert	Jeju City	South Korea		
October 9, 2012	Open Concert	Seoul	South Korea	"Sexy Love"; "Roly Poly"	
November 4, 2012	Open Concert	Seoul	South Korea		
November 26, 2012	South Korea-Vietnam 20th Diplomatic Relations Concert	Hanoi	Vietnam	"Lovey Dovey"	
November 29, 2012	K-Pop Festival In Hanoi (Note: Show! Music Core Special Concert)	Hanoi	Vietnam	"Roly Poly"	
December 16, 2012	2012 K-Pop Collection Concert	Seoul	South Korea	"Sexy Love"; "Lovey Dovey"	
April 21, 2013	M!Countdown Nihao Taiwan	Taipei	Taiwan	"Sexy Love"; "Lovey Dovey"	
May 11, 2013	19th Dream Concert	Seoul	South Korea		
May 12, 2013	Open Concert	Seoul	South Korea		
June 9, 2013	Open Concert	Seoul	South Korea		
December 1, 2013	Open Concert	Seoul	South Korea	"Number Nine"	
December 12, 2013	Open Concert	Seoul	South Korea	"Do You Know Me?"; "Round & Round"	
June 7, 2014	20th Dream Concert	Seoul	South Korea	"Number Nine"; "Never Ever" (Jiyeon solo)	
September 11, 2014	17th Asian Games	Incheon	South Korea	"Sugar Free"; "Number Nine"	
October 14, 2014	Mnet Super Concert	Seoul	South Korea	"Sugar Free"	
December 7, 2014	Korean Music Wave	Beijing	China	"Sugar Free"	
December 18, 2014	Nature Republic Ceremony	Seoul	South Korea		
March 15, 2015	Johor Sultan Coronation Ceremony	Johor Bahru	Malaysia	"Sugar Free"	
May 23, 2015	21st Dream Concert	Seoul	South Korea	"Little Apple"; "I'm Good" (Eunjung)	
May 27, 2015	Galaxy Phase II Opening Ceremony	Cotai	Macau	"Little Apple"	
June 4, 2015	Quantum Of The Seas Inaugural Ceremony	Shanghai	China	Unknown	
September 7, 2015	16th Social Welfare Day Concert	Seoul	South Korea	"So Crazy"	
October 11, 2015	Tianjin Music Concert	Tianjin	China	"So Crazy"; "Roly Poly"; "Number Nine"	
November 29, 2015	World of Warships Press Conference	Shanghai	China	"So Crazy"; "Cry Cry"	
November 22, 2015	Demacia Cup Tournament (Opening ceremony)	Wuhan	China	"So Crazy"; "Bo peep Bo Peep"; "Number Nine"	
December 31, 2015	Jiangsu Tv 2016 New Year's Eve Concert	Nanjing	China	"Bo peep Bo Peep"; "Little Apple"	
May 3, 2016	K-pop In Jeju Concert	Jeju City	South Korea	"Roly Poly"; "Number Nine"; "Bo peep Bo Peep"	
May 28, 2016	M!Countdown In China	Shanghai	China	"Roly Poly"; "So Crazy"; "Bo peep Bo Peep"	
June 4, 2016	22nd Dream Concert	Seoul	South Korea	"Roly Poly"; "So Crazy"	
November 27, 2016	2016 Super Seoul Dream Concert	Seoul	South Korea	"Tiamo"; "Number Nine"	
March 18, 2017	12th Seoul Girls Collection LIVE	Seoul	South Korea	"Tiamo"; "Number Nine"; "So Crazy"; "Roly Poly"	
January 17, 2017	V Live Year End Concert	Ho Chi Minh City	Vietnam	"Roly Poly"; "Bo peep Bo Peep"; "Number Nine"; "So Crazy"; "Tiamo"	
July 5, 2017	Open Concert	Seoul	South Korea	"Roly Poly"; "What's My Name?"	
September 23, 2017	Three Friends Talk Concert	Tokyo	Japan	"What's My Name?"	
November 5, 2017	25th Korea-Vietnam Relations Anniversary	Ho Chi Minh City	Vietnam	"Roly Poly"; "Number Nine"; "Lovey Dovey"	
November 23, 2017	K-pop Music Wave Concert	Kuala Lumpur	Malaysia	"Roly Poly"; "Lovey Dovey"; "Number Nine"; "Like The First Time"; "What's My Name?"; "20090727"	
October 2, 2020	Civilization Express Special concert	Seoul	South Korea	"Roly Poly"; "Sexy Love"	
May 31, 2025	Ye!loo Concert	Kuala Lumpur	Malaysia	"Roly Poly"; "Bo Peep Bo peep"; "Sexy Love"; "Lovey Dovey"; "All Kill"; "20090719	
October 3, 2026	Ganzberg Super Idol Concert	Koh Pich	Cambodia	"Bo Peep Bo peep"; "Number Nine"; "You Drive Me Crazy"; "Sexy Love"; "Lovey Dovey"; "Roly Poly"; "So Crazy"	

== Guest performances ==
Date	Event	Artist	City	Country	Ref.
January 15, 2011	Ha Chun-hwa 50th Anniversary Concert	Ha Chun-Hwa	Seoul	South Korea	
December 25, 2011	2010 Merry Christmas Davichi	Davichi	Seoul	South Korea	
December 27, 2011	Davichi Concert Adieu! 2011	Davichi	Seoul	South Korea	
September 15, 2012	Mija Lee's Little Girl from Heuksando	Lee Mija	Seoul	South Korea	
December 30, 2014	Park Myung-Soo EDM Concert	Park Myung-Soo	Seoul	South Korea	
March 8, 2015	Jeon Young-rok 40th Anniversary Concert	Jeon Young-rok	Seoul	South Korea	

== Television shows & Specials ==
Year	Date	Show	Performed Song(s)	Country	Ref.
2009	May 8, 2009	Music Bank	"Women's Generation"	South Korea	
2009	May 13, 2009	Show! Music Core	"Women's Generation"	South Korea	
2009	May 16, 2009	Show! Music Core	"Forever Love"	South Korea	
2009	June 6, 2009	Show! Music Core	"Women's Generation"	South Korea	
2009	June 14, 2009	Inkigayo	"Women's Generation"	South Korea	
2009	July 21, 2009	Music Bank	Lies"; "Wanna Play?"	South Korea	
2009	August 2, 2009	Inkigayo	Lies"; "Wanna Play?"	South Korea	
2009	August 8, 2009	Show! Music Core	"Lies"	South Korea	
2009	August 9, 2009	Music Bank	"Lies"	South Korea	
2009	August 13, 2009	M Countdown	"Lies"	South Korea	
2009	August 14, 2009	Music Bank	"Lies"	South Korea	
2009	August 15, 2009 (Note: Debut stage special)	Show! Music Core	"Lies"; "Dreams Come True" (cover)	South Korea	
2009	August 16, 2009 (Note: Debut stage special)	Inkigayo	"Lies"; To My Boyfriend (cover)	South Korea	
2009	August 27, 2009	M Countdown	"How Come" (Note: Brown Eyed Girls cover); "Now" (Note: Fin.K.L cover)	South Korea	
2009	August 29, 2009	Show! Music Core	"Lies"	South Korea	
2009	August 30, 2009	Inkigayo	"Lies"	South Korea	
2009	September 4, 2009	Music Bank	"Lies"	South Korea	
2009	September 5, 2009	Show! Music Core	"Lies"	South Korea	
2009	September 6, 2009	Inkigayo	"Lies"	South Korea	
2009	September 10, 2009	M Countdown	"Lies"	South Korea	
2009	September 13, 2009	Inkigayo	"Lies"	South Korea	
2009	September 19, 2009	Show! Music Core	"TTL (Time To Love)"	South Korea	
2009	September 20, 2009	Inkigayo	"TTL (Time To Love)"	South Korea	
2009	September 26, 2009	Kim Jung-eun's Chocolate	"Break Away" (cover); "Lies"	South Korea	
2009	September 26, 2009	Show! Music Core	"TTL (Time To Love)"	South Korea	
2009	October 9, 2009	Music Bank	"TTL (Time To Love)"	South Korea	
2009	October 17, 2009	Show! Music Core	"TTL Listen 2"	South Korea	
2009	October 24, 2009	Show! Music Core	"TTL Listen 2"	South Korea	
2009	October 31, 2009	Show! Music Core	"TTL Listen 2"	South Korea	
2009	December 5, 2009 (Note: Open air show)	Show! Music Core	"Bo Peep Bo Peep"	South Korea	
2009	December 6, 2009	Inkigayo	"Bo Peep Bo Peep"	South Korea	
2009	December 18, 2009	Music Bank	"Bo Peep Bo Peep"	South Korea	
2009	December 19, 2009	Show! Music Core	"Bo Peep Bo Peep"	South Korea	
2009	December 20, 2009 (Note: Special Christmas stage)	Music Bank	"Bo Peep Bo Peep" (Christmas Ver.)	South Korea	
2009	December 25, 2009 (Note: Special Christmas stage)	Inkigayo	"Bo Peep Bo Peep" (Christmas Ver.)	South Korea	
2010	January 1, 2010 (Note: Chuseok Special stage)	Music Bank	"Bo Peep Bo Peep (Traditional Ver.)"	South Korea	
2010	January 2, 2010 (Note: Chuseok Special stage)	Show! Music Core	"Bo Peep Bo Peep (Traditional Ver.)"	South Korea	
2010	January 3, 2010 (Note: Chuseok Special stage)	Inkigayo	"Bo Peep Bo Peep (Traditional Ver.)"	South Korea	
2010	January 10, 2010	Inkigayo	"Bo Peep Bo Peep"	South Korea	
2010	January 15, 2010	Music Bank	"Wonder Woman"	South Korea	
2010	January 17, 2010	Inkigayo	"Bo Peep Bo Peep"	South Korea	
2010	January 16, 2010	Show! Music Core	"Wonder Woman"; "Like The First Time"	South Korea	
2010	January 21, 2010	Inkigayo	"Like The First Time"	South Korea	
2010	January 22, 2010	Music Bank	"Like The First Time"	South Korea	
2010	January 23, 2010	Show! Music Core	"Wonder Woman"; "Like The First Time"	South Korea	
2010	January 24, 2010	Inkigayo	"Like The First Time"	South Korea	
2010	January 30, 2010	Show! Music Core	"Wonder Woman"	South Korea	
2010	February 2, 2010	Show! Music Core	"Wonder Woman"	South Korea	
2010	February 27, 2010	Show! Music Core	"You Drive Me Crazy"	South Korea	
2010	February 28, 2010	Inkigayo	"You Drive Me Crazy"	South Korea	
2010	March 3, 2010	You Hee-yeo's Sketchbook	"Bo Peep Bo Peep"; "You Drive Me Crazy"; "Wait A Minute" (Note: The Pussycat Dolls cover)(Jiyeon and Eunjung); "3" (Note: Britney Spears cover)(Qri)	South Korea	
2010	March 7, 2010	Inkigayo	"You Drive Me Crazy"	South Korea	
2010	March 12, 2010	Music Bank	"You Drive Me Crazy"	South Korea	
2010	March 13, 2010	Show! Music Core	"You Drive Me Crazy"	South Korea	
2010	March 14, 2010	Inkigayo	"You Drive Me Crazy"	South Korea	
2010	March 20, 2010	Show! Music Core	"You Drive Me Crazy"	South Korea	
2010	March 21, 2010	Inkigayo	"You Drive Me Crazy"	South Korea	
2010	April 11, 2010	Inkigayo	"I'm Really Hurt"	South Korea	
2010	July 18, 2010	Kim Jung-eun's Chocolate	"Wingless Angel" (Note: Roo'ra cover); "Flying in the Deep Night" (Note: Lee Moon-sae cover)) (with Kim Soo-ro)	South Korea	
2010	September 22, 2010	Idol Star Trot Match (Note: Chuseok special program)	"Seoul Trot" (Note: Cover, performed by Soyeon Qri, and Boram)	South Korea	
2010	December 3, 2010	Music Bank	"Waeroni"	South Korea	
2010	December 5, 2010	Inkigayo	"Waeroni"; "Yayaya"	South Korea	
2010	December 11, 2010	Show! Music Core	"Waeroni"; "Yayaya"	South Korea	
2010	December 12, 2010	Kim Jung-eun's Chocolate	"Yayaya"	South Korea	
2010	December 18, 2010	Show! Music Core	"Waeroni"	South Korea	
2010	December 24, 2010 (Note: Special Christmas stage)	Music Bank	"Yayaya" (Christmas Ver.)	South Korea	
2011	January 8, 2011	Show! Music Core	"Waeroni"	South Korea	
2011	January 14, 2011	Music Bank	"Yayaya"	South Korea	
2011	February 3, 2011	Star Dance Battle (Note: Lunar New Year special program)	Battery Love (cover)	South Korea	
2011	February 4, 2011	Star Dance Battle	D.I.S.C.O (cover)	South Korea	
2011	February 4, 2011	Idol Star 7080 Best Singer (Note: Lunar New Year special program)	"Sparks"; "My Love Crybaby" (Note: Both Jeon Yeong-Rok covers)	South Korea	
2011	July 1, 2011	Music Bank	"Roly Poly"	South Korea	
2011	July 16, 2011	Show! Music Core	"Roly Poly"	South Korea	
2011	July 24, 2011	Inkigayo	"Roly Poly"	South Korea	
2011	August 5, 2011	Music Bank	"Roly Poly In Copacabana"	South Korea	
2011	August 8, 2011	Concert 7080	"My Love Crybaby" (Note: Jeon Yeong-Rok cover)	South Korea	
2011	August 10, 2011	Inkigayo	"Roly Poly In Copacabana"	South Korea	
2011	August 23, 2011	Morning Place	"Roly Poly"; "I Don't Know Anything But Love" (Note: Sim Soo-bong cover) (Soyeon); "Love Song" (Note: Pansori folktale song from Chunhyangga)(Eunjung); "All That Jazz" (Note: Chita Rivera cover, from Chicago musical) (Hyomin)	South Korea	
2011	September 7, 2011	Made In BS	"Bo Peep Bo Peep"	Japan	
2011	October 15, 2011 (Note: Open air show)	Show! Music Core	"Roly Poly"; "Waeroni"	South Korea	
2011	November 18, 2011	Music Bank	"Cry Cry"; "Cry Cry (Ballad Ver.)"	South Korea	
2011	November 19, 2011	Show! Music Core	"Cry Cry"; "Cry Cry (Ballad Ver.)"	South Korea	
2011	December 2, 2011	Music Bank	"Cry Cry"	South Korea	
2011	December 3, 2011	Show! Music Core	"Cry Cry"	South Korea	
2011	December 11, 2011	Inkigayo	"Cry Cry"	South Korea	
2011	December 18, 2011	Music Japan	"Yayaya"	Japan	
2012	January 1, 2012	Inkigayo	"Cry Cry"; "We Were In Love"	South Korea	
2012	January 6, 2012	Music Bank	"Lovey Dovey"	South Korea	
2012	January 7, 2012	Show! Music Core	"Lovey Dovey"	South Korea	
2012	January 8, 2012	Inkigayo	"Lovey Dovey"; "We Were In Love"	South Korea	
2012	January 15, 2012	Inkigayo	"We Were In Love"	South Korea	
2012	January 20, 2012	Music Bank	"Lovey Dovey"	South Korea	
2012	January 21, 2012	Show! Music Core	"Lovey Dovey" (With Coed School)	South Korea	
2012	February 29, 2012	Made In BS	"Roly Poly"; "Snow Flower" (Note: Mika Nakashima cover) (Soyeon)	Japan	
2012	June 22, 2012	Made In BS	"Lovey Dovey"	Japan	
2012	July 7, 2012	Show! Music Core	"Day By Day"; "Don't Leave"	South Korea	
2012	July 15, 2012	Inkigayo	"Day By Day"	South Korea	
2012	July 20, 2012	Music Bank	"Day By Day"	South Korea	
2012	July 21, 2012	Show! Music Core	"Day By Day"	South Korea	
2012	July 28, 2012 (Note: Open air show)	Show! Music Core	"Day By Day"	South Korea	
2012	September 6, 2012	M Countdown	"Day and Night"	South Korea	
2012	September 8, 2012	Show! Music Core	"Sexy Love"	South Korea	
2012	September 9, 2012	Inkigayo	"Sexy Love"	South Korea	
2012	September 14, 2012	Music Bank	"Sexy Love"	South Korea	
2012	September 15, 2012	Show! Music Core	"Sexy Love"	South Korea	
2013	February 8, 2013	Anhui TV Spring Gala Festival	"Roly Poly"; "Bo Beep Bo Peep"	China	
2013	April 24, 2013	M Countdown	"Sexy Love"; "Lovey Dovey"	South Korea	
2013	October 10, 2013	M Countdown	"Number Nine"; "I Know The Feeling"	South Korea	
2013	October 11, 2013	Music Bank	"Number Nine"; "I Know The Feeling"	South Korea	
2013	October 12, 2013	Show! Music Core	"Number Nine"; "I Know The Feeling"	South Korea	
2013	October 17, 2013	M Countdown	"Number Nine"	South Korea	
2013	October 19, 2013	Show! Music Core	"Number Nine"	South Korea	
2013	October 20, 2013	Inkigayo	"Number Nine"	South Korea	
2013	October 29, 2013	The Show	"Number Nine"	South Korea	
2013	November 2, 2013	Show! Music Core	"Number Nine"	South Korea	
2013	November 11, 2013	Show! Music Core	"Number Nine"	South Korea	
2013	November 12, 2013	The Show	"Lies"	South Korea	
2013	December 5, 2013	M Countdown	"Do You Know Me?"	South Korea	
2013	December 6, 2013	Music Bank	"Do You Know Me?"	South Korea	
2013	December 7, 2013	Show! Music Core	"Do You Know Me?"	South Korea	
2013	December 8, 2013	Inkigayo	"Do You Know Me?"	South Korea	
2013	December 12, 2013	M Countdown	"Do You Know Me?"	South Korea	
2013	December 14, 2013	Show! Music Core	"Do You Know Me?"	South Korea	
2013	December 15, 2013	Inkigayo	"Do You Know Me?"	South Korea	
2013	December 17, 2013	Simply K-Pop	"Do You Know Me?"	South Korea	
2013	December 17, 2013	The Show	"Do You Know Me?"	South Korea	
2013	December 19, 2013	M Countdown	"Do You Know Me?"	South Korea	
2013	December 21, 2013	Show! Music Core	"Do You Know Me?"	South Korea	
2013	December 22, 2013	Inkigayo	"Do You Know Me?"	South Korea	
2013	December 22, 2013	Concert 7080	"Do You Know Me?"; "Round & Round"	South Korea	
2014	January 7, 2014	Simply K-Pop	"Do You Know Me?"; "Roly Poly"	South Korea	
2014	March 8, 2014 (Note: 400th Episode Special)	Show! Music Core	"Do You Know Me?" (Remix); "Roly Poly"	South Korea	
2014	September 11, 2014	M Countdown	"Sugar Free"; "I Don't Want You"	South Korea	
2014	September 12, 2014	Music Bank	"Sugar Free"	South Korea	
2014	September 13, 2014	Show! Music Core	"Sugar Free"; "I Don't Want You"	South Korea	
2014	September 14, 2014	Inkigayo	"Sugar Free"; "I Don't Want You"	South Korea	
2014	September 16, 2014	The Show	"Sugar Free"; "I Don't Want You"	South Korea	
2014	September 18, 2014	M Countdown	"Sugar Free"	South Korea	
2014	September 20, 2014	Show! Music Core	"Sugar Free"	South Korea	
2014	September 21, 2014	Inkigayo	"Sugar Free"	South Korea	
2014	September 25, 2014	M Countdown	"Sugar Free"	South Korea	
2014	September 26, 2014	Simply K-Pop	"Sugar Free"; "I Don't Want You"	South Korea	
2014	October 3, 2014	Music Bank	"Sugar Free"	South Korea	
2014	October 4, 2014	Show! Music Core	"Sugar Free"	South Korea	
2014	October 10, 2014	Music Bank	"Sugar Free"	South Korea	
2014	November 25, 2014	The Show	"Little Apple"	South Korea	
2014	November 29, 2014	Show! Music Core	"Little Apple"	South Korea	
2014	December 2, 2014	The Show	"Little Apple"	South Korea	
2014	December 19, 2014	Day Day UP	"Bo Peep Bo Peep"; "Sexy Love"	China	
2014	December 23, 2014	The Show	"Sugar Free"	South Korea	
2015	February 6, 2015	Day Day UP	"Roly Poly"	China	
2015	February 12, 2015	M Countdown	"Don't Forget Me"	South Korea	
2015	February 13, 2015	Music Bank	"Don't Forget Me"	South Korea	
2015	February 14, 2015	Show! Music Core	"Don't Forget Me"	South Korea	
2015	February 17, 2015	The Show	"Don't Forget Me"	South Korea	
2015	February 19, 2015	Hunan TV Spring Festival Gala	"Little Apple"; "Sexy Love"	China	
2015	May 9, 2015	Fashion King Korea	"Sugar Free"	South Korea	
2015	August 4, 2015	The Show	"So Crazy"	South Korea	
2015	August 8, 2015	Show! Music Core	"So Crazy"	South Korea	
2015	August 9, 2015	Inkigayo	"So Crazy"	South Korea	
2015	August 11, 2015	The Show	"So Crazy"	South Korea	
2015	August 14, 2015	Music Bank	"So Crazy"	South Korea	
2015	August 16, 2015 (Note: Open air show)	Inkigayo	"So Crazy"	South Korea	
2015	August 20, 2015	M Countdown	"So Crazy"	South Korea	
2015	August 21, 2015	Simply K-Pop	"So Crazy"	South Korea	
2015	August 22, 2015	Show! Music Core	"So Crazy"	South Korea	
2015	August 22, 2015	Music Bank	"So Crazy"	South Korea	
2015	August 23, 2015	Inkigayo	"So Crazy"	South Korea	
2015	August 25, 2015	The Show	"So Crazy"	South Korea	
2015	August 27, 2015	M Countdown	"So Crazy"	South Korea	
2015	August 28, 2015	Simply K-Pop	"So Crazy"	South Korea	
2015	September 8, 2015	A Song for You 4	"For You" (Acoustic Ver.)	South Korea	
2015	September 10, 2015	Quiz On Korea	"So Crazy"	South Korea	
2015	September 28, 2015	National Idol Singing Contest (Note: Chuseok special program)	Open The Door (cover)	South Korea	
2015	December 13, 2015	CCTV Spring Festival Gala	"Little Apple"	China	
2016	February 8, 2016	BTV Spring Festival Gala	"Lovey Dovey"	China	
2016	June 2, 2016 (Note: M Countdown In China)	M Countdown	"So Crazy"; "Bo Peep Bo Peep"; "Roly Poly"	South Korea	
2016	November 10, 2016	M Countdown	"Tiamo"; "Hurt Until Today"	South Korea	
2016	November 11, 2016	Music Bank	"Tiamo"	South Korea	
2016	November 13, 2016	Inkigayo	"Tiamo"	South Korea	
2016	November 15, 2016	The Show	"Tiamo"; "Hurt Until Today"	South Korea	
2016	November 19, 2011	Show! Music Core	"Tiamo"	South Korea	
2016	November 20, 2011	Inkigayo	"Tiamo"	South Korea	
2016	November 22, 2011	The Show	"Tiamo"	South Korea	
2016	November 25, 2011	Music Bank	"Tiamo"	South Korea	
2016	November 26, 2011	Show! Music Core	"Tiamo"	South Korea	
2016	December 9, 2016	The Brain 3	"Roly Poly"; "Sexy Love"	China	
2017	June 15, 2017	M Countdown	"What's My Name?"; "Ooh La La" (Hyomin solo)	South Korea	
2017	June 16, 2017	Music Bank	"What's My Name?"; "Reload"	South Korea	
2017	June 17, 2017	Show! Music Core	"What's My Name?"; "Reload"	South Korea	
2017	June 18, 2017	Inkigayo	"What's My Name?"; "Reload"	South Korea	
2017	June 20, 2017	The Show	"What's My Name?"; "Diamond" (Qri solo)	South Korea	
2017	June 22, 2017	M Countdown	"What's My Name?"	South Korea	
2017	June 23, 2017	Music Bank	"What's My Name?"	South Korea	
2017	June 24, 2017	SNL Korea 9	"You Drive Me Crazy"; "Roly Poly"; "Lovey Dovey"; "Bo Peep Bo Peep"	South Korea	
2017	June 24, 2017	Show! Music Core	"What's My Name?"	South Korea	
2017	June 25, 2017	Inkigayo	"What's My Name?"	South Korea	
2017	June 27, 2017	The Show	"What's My Name?"	South Korea	
2017	July 1, 2017	Show! Music Core	"What's My Name?"	South Korea	
2020	October 2, 2020	Civilization Express	"Roly Poly"; "Sexy Love"	South Korea	
2022	April 22, 2022	Famous Singer 2	"Roly Poly"; "Lovey Dovey (Rock Ver.)"	South Korea	

== Radio shows ==
Year	Date	Show	Performed Song(s)
2016	November 21, 2016	Tell Them to Live	"Tiamo"
2016	November 25, 2016	Two-man Show	"Tiamo"

== Home media ==
Rights to several T-ara concerts were licensed and sold and aired (Live and re-broadcast) to different distributors. In August 2011, T-ara's First Showcase In Japan was aired on Japan's largest broadcasting satellite Sky Perfect TV. In 2011, T-ara's First Showcase In Japan received a nationwide 3D screening in Japan by Warner production which operates 498 screens nationwide.

Broadcast date	Concert	Channel	Country	Original date	Ref.
August 14, 2011	T-ara First Showcase In Japan	Sky Perfect TV	Japan	July 5, 2011	
August 27, 2011	T-ara First Showcase In Japan	Fuji TV	Japan	July 5, 2011	
September 9, 2012	T-ARA JAPAN TOUR 2012 ~Jewelry box~	Sky Perfect TV	Japan	July 26, 2012	
September 23, 2013	T-ara Concert in Mongolia	ETV	Mongolia	September 23, 2013	
Unknown	T-ara Live Arch	BS Fuji TV	Japan	September 25–27, 2013	
February 14, 2014	T-ara & Speed Concert In Phnom Penh	MYTV	Cambodia	February 14, 2014	
February 14, 2014	T-ara & Speed Concert In Phnom Penh	CTN	Cambodia	February 14, 2014	
September 17, 2016	T-ara Great China Tour - Shanghai FINAL	Panda TV	China	September 17, 2016	
November 9, 2016	"Remember" Comeback Showcase	V Live	Global	November 9, 2016	
June 14, 2017	"What's My Name?" Comeback Showcase	V Live	Global	June 14, 2017	
November 4, 2017	T-ara Vietnam Concert 2017	PFT	Vietnam	November 4, 2017	
November 4, 2017	T-ara Vietnam Concert 2017	Panda TV	China	November 4, 2017	
