= T-ara Great China Tour =

2015–2016 concert tour by T-ara

- Tour by T-ara
- T-ara final tour concert in Shanghai poster
- Location: China
- Associated album: So Good
- Start date: 20 June 2015
- End date: 17 September 2016
- No. of shows: 5

T-ara concert chronology
- Treasure Box: Second Japan Tour (2013); T-ara Great China Tour (2015–2016); ...

T-ara Great China Tour was the fifth tour by South Korean girl group T-ara and their first in China. It began in Shanghai on and concluded in the same city on 25 November 2014. In October 2015, T-ara became the first South Korean artist to hold a concert in Hefei. The final stop in Shanghai drew a crowd of 12,000 attendees and was watched by nearly 2 million viewers in China alone through the streaming platform Panda TV. Originally T-ara were planned to perform in 13 cities, however, due to schedule conflicts, the tour was reduced to 6 shows only.

== Background and development ==
On 29 December 2014, T-ara held their "T-ara China Tour - Shanghai Greeting Concert" marking the start of their tour promotion in China. The event was attended by Wang Sicong, son of businessman Wang Jianlin.

The "T-ara Great China Tour 2015–16" began in Hefei and concluded in Shanghai in September 2016. It marked T-ara's first concerts in Hefei and Nanjing. On 20 May, several music officials announced that T-ara would embark on their first official tour in China in June 2015. On 20 June, T-ara attended the press conference for the tour in Nanjing at Nanjing's Sofitel Galaxy Hotel.

On 10 July 2015, T-ara held a press conference to promote their Beijing concert, announcing they did not invite any guest performers to the event to allow for personal interaction with their fans.. Pre-sale for the final stop on the tour in Shanghai began on 17 August. According to MBK Entertainment, the final concert would feature new songs. China Daily reported thay the final concert had a high production cost, with stage effects designed by teams from Hong Kong and Taiwan, alongside professional directors from South Korea. The concert was held on an extended stage, allowing fans to interact closely with the group. Originally T-ara were planned to perform in 13 cities, however, due to schedule conflicts, the tour was reduced to 6 shows only.

China Daily reported that the Shanghai concert had a high production cost, with stage effects designed by teams from Hong Kong and Taiwan, alongside professional directors from Korea. The concert was held on an extended stage, allowing fans to interact closely with the group.

== Concert synopsis ==
The concerts on the "T-ara Great China Tour" followed a consistent identical setlist structure, starting with T-ara's hit songs in the first act, followed by three solo stages, a group stage, solo performances by the remaining members, a final group performance, and an encore. The first concert in Shanghai featured a different setlist. T-ara maintained their standard format for tour concerts, with each member showcasing a solo stage. Members who had not officially debuted as solo artists performed covers of other artists' songs. While no new songs were introduced during the final stop in Shanghai, contrary to MBK Entertainment's earlier announcement, some songs were performed for the first time, including "For You" (acoustic version, with six members) and "Hurt".

== Commercial performance ==
On 29 December 2014 NetEase News reported that over 3,000 people attended the first concert of the tour, titled "T-ara China Tour - Shanghai Greeting Concert". On 21 June 2015, Jiangsu News reported that T-ara broke box office records for their first concert in Nanjing. According to Ideal Celestial Pictures, the event organizer, tickets priced at 380 Yuan (~US $62) and 580 (~US $94) Yuan were the most popular among fans and sold-out on the day of sales, alongside VIP tickets priced at 1,380 Yuan (~US $223). Reportedly, all 4,000 tickets for the Nanjing concert were sold-out. Similarly, Aju Business Daily reported that 5,000 tickets for the Guangzhou concert were sold out. The Shanghai show attracted approximately 12,000 attendees, setting a record as the largest audience for a Korean girl group in the country. It also reached a wide online audience, with nearly 2 million viewers tuning in live on Panda TV in China.

== Set lists ==
This set list is from the concert on 17 September 2016, in Shanghai, It is not intended to represent all shows from the tour.

Set list in Shanghai (2016)

Main Set
Act 1

1. "Sugar Free"
2. "Number Nine"
3. "DAY BY DAY"
4. "For You"
5. "ORGR"
6. "Cry Cry"

Act 2

1. "Never Ever" (Jiyeon Solo)
2. "I Can Fly" (Soyeon Solo / Joey Yung Cover)
3. "Sweet Dream" (Boram Solo / Jang Nara Cover)

Act 3

1. "Yayaya"
2. "Sexy Love"
3. "Hurt"
4. "Why We Separated"
5. "Roly-Poly"
6. "I Don't Want You"

Act 4

1. "Sketch" (Hyomin Solo / Chinese Ver.)
2. "Goodbye" (Eunjung Solo / Chinese Ver.)
3. "Joolae" (Qri Solo / Lee Jung-hyun cover)

Act 5

1. "Why Are You Being Like This?"
2. "You Drive Me Crazy"
3. "Like The First Time"
4. "TTL (Time to Love)"

Encore

1. "So Crazy" (Chinese Ver.)
2. "Bo Peep Bo Peep"

== Tour dates ==
List of tour dates
Date	City	Venue	Attendance	Ref.
25 November 2014	Shanghai	Shanghai International Gymnastics Center	3,000	
20 June 2015	Nanjing	Nanjing Sun Palace Theater	4,000	
11 July 2015	Beijing	Workers Indoor Arena	—	
21 October 2015	Hefei	Hefei Sports Center Gymnasium	—	
19 December 2015	Guangzhou	Guangzhou Gymnasium	5,000	
17 September 2016	Shanghai	Mercedes-Benz Arena	12,000	
Total			N/A	

== Home media ==
Rights to all the tour shows (except the 25 November 2014 show) were sold to Chinese online streaming services Douyan and Panda TV. The last two stop on the tour in Guangzhou and Shanghai respectively were edited into DVDs by Banana Project and were sold in China and Malaysia.
