= Cry Cry =

2011 single by T-ara

- Cry Cry ＆ Lovey-Dovey Music Video Collection Cover

Single by T-ara

from the album Black Eyes
- Language: Korean
- Released: November 11, 2011
- Recorded: 2011
- Genre: K-pop; dance-pop
- Length: 3:17
- Label: Core Contents Media
- Songwriters: An Young-min; Kim Tae-hyun

T-ara singles chronology
"Roly Poly" (2011)	"Cry Cry" (2011)	"We Were in Love" (2011)

Music video
- "Cry Cry (Dance ver.)" on YouTube "Cry Cry (Drama ver.)" on YouTube "Cry Cry (Ballad ver.)" on YouTube

"Cry Cry" is a single recorded by South Korean girl group T-ara, Its release was originally set for release on November 18, 2011, but was pushed forward one week to November 11 due to the demand for the album's lead track, "Cry Cry". It served as the lead track for the group's third EP, Black Eyes. The song achieved commercial and critical success, topping the Gaon Chart and Billboard Korea Hot 100 charts. It emerged as one of the best-selling Korean singles of the 2010s, amassing 3.8 million downloads as of 2012.

== Background and release ==
The group's agency, Core Contents Media, released a series posters for "Cry Cry" showcasing parts of the short film, on November 4, 2011. Black Eyes was released on November 17, 2011, with the single on the same day. Due to a computer issue, the release was delayed and was released 2 hours late. A ballad version was also released within the EP. The audio track from the ballad version music video was also included on Black Eyes along with the original ballad version of the song.

On October 10, 2012, "Cry Cry" was featured on T-ara's first greatest hits album, T-ara's Best of Best 2009–2012: Korean ver along with its music video on the DVD set. The song was re-recorded in Japanese and reloaded on T-ara's first Japanese album Jewelry Box. A Chinese version of the song was released to promote the online game World of Warships in 2015. The song is only available for streaming and download on Chinese planforms such as QQ Music and Kugou.

== Composition ==
Penned by producers Kim Tae-hyun and Ahn Young-min, "Cry Cry" is described as a captivating Spanish-inspired track characterized by a bold arrangement, a dynamic beat and rich guitar melodies. The poignant lyrics convey the deep sorrow of a lover facing the pain of separation. Eunjung describes the song as an "upgrade" of "You Drive Me Crazy". The ballad version of the song features a slower tempo with a stripped-down arrangement centered on piano and strings.

== Creative direction ==
On December 7, 2011, Core Contents Media announced that Soyeon would become the new leader of T-ara under the group’s rotational leadership system. Soyeon was slated to hold the position for 6 to 8 months, overseeing the Black Eyes and its re-issue Funky Town promotion period. The leadership system allowed the leader to play a pivotal role in shaping the group's creative direction, including conceptualizing ideas, collaborating with composers, deciding on styling, in addition to managing group activities and schedules. Furthermore, the leader provided support for members' individual projects.

In an interview with Money Today, Soyeon revealed that the group collaborated with the production team, discussing and brainstorming ideas for the album's concept, style, and choreography. Hyomin explained that the group deliberately embraces a 180-degree transformation with each comeback, consistently choosing unconventional concepts, stages, and songs. She expressed their goal of embodying a "chameleon-like" image, constantly evolving and adapting to new creative directions while staying true to their core identity.

The choreography for "Cry Cry" was created by Yama & Hotchicks dance studio, known for their work on several of T-ara's previous hits, including "Bo Peep Bo Peep", "You're Driving Me Crazy" and "Why Are You Being Like This?". The dance features symbolic movements, such as the members wiping away their tears. Hyomin, who performs with a cane throughout the song, credited veteran artists TVXQ and Rain as sources of inspiration for her performance style.

== Music videos ==
=== Background and release ===
On September 15, 2011, Core Contents Media, T-ara's agency, announced that their new single feature three different music videos. A 40-seconds teaser for "Cry Cry" was released on November 1, 2011. "Cry Cry" (Drama Ver.) premiered on November 9, two days before the album's release, in a form of a noir-style and melodramatic short film, on South Korean media player GOMTV. Cha Eun-taek directed the film while veteran actors Cha Seung-won and Ji Chang-wook starred in the video. In an interview, Jiyeon revealed that no stunt doubles were used for the action scenes, instead, she and the other T-ara members performed all the stunts themselves. Filming took place in Busan for approximately 96 hours over the course of 4 days.

On November 11, T-ara released the second music video for "Cry Cry" with the ballad version. Another short music video featuring the dance version of the song was released on November 18, 2011. It was filmed in Namyangju. On April 25, 2012, T-ara released Cry Cry & Lovey-Dovey Music Video Collection, a limited edition DVD that contains all music video versions of "Cry Cry" and "Lovey Dovey" alongside their making of videos. It also includes a 72 page photobook. In 2015, the song was released in Chinese with a new music video to promote the online game World of Warships.

The drama version of "Lovey Dovey" is a continuation of "Cry Cry" (Drama Ver.) that ended the story. The "Cry Cry" / "Lovey Dovey" short movie stands out as one of the longest music videos in K-pop's history, boasting a 30-minute runtime. Over US$1 million (₩1.2 billion) were invested to produce the short-film, making it one of the most expensive music videos in K-pop.

=== Synopsis ===
The drama version of "Cry Cry" depicts a private detective (Cha Seung-won) who, accidentally, shoots the head of a criminal organization during an investigation and leaves the police organization out of guilt. Afterwards, he ends up raising the head of the criminal organization's daughter Ji-yeaon (Jiyeon). Ji-yeon lives with him as a bounty hunter, not knowing that Cha Seung-won is the one who killed her father. She coincidentally encounters one of the criminals (Ji Chang-wook), who was in the organization in the past, and through him, she learns that the person who killed her father was Cha Seung-won. The storyline depicts betrayal, revenge, and loss. The video integrates key elements of the song into the progression of the plot.

=== Reception ===
"Cry Cry" (Drama Ver.) climbed to the first position on GOMTVs Music Video chart, 30 minutes after the release, amassing over 4 million views on the platform within the first month. In addition, T-ara's official homepage saw a surge in traffic, with fans flocking to the site in record numbers. The DVD collection peaked at number 17 on Oricon chart, and charted for 6 weeks selling nearly 4,000 copies.

The music videos received widespread acclaim by both fans and critics for its quality cinematic, compelling storyline, and strong acting performances that complemented the song. In 2011, Baek Su-won of New2Day commended Jiyeon, Eunjung, Hyomin and Qri for their "passionate" performances in the drama version. Notably, Jaekyung Newspaper singled out Jiyeon’s performance, praising her acting as being on par with Cha Seung-won’s and lauding the on-screen chemistry between the two. In 2015, an editor for KKBox Taiwan praised the drama version of "Cry Cry" for its cinematic quality, describing it as "as exciting as a mini-movie". The video was also featured in their list of the bloodiest K-pop music videos.

== Promotion and live performances ==
=== Performances ===
"Cry Cry" was actively promoted on multiple music shows, beginning with Mnet's M Countdown on November 17, followed by KBS's Music Bank on November 18. However, promotions faced challenges as Eunjung was unable to attend most performances due to her commitments to the drama Insu, the Queen Mother at the time. Additional disruptions arose when Eunjung sustained a knee injury, and Jiyeon experienced severe fatigue during their performance on SBS's Inkigayo. Her latter's condition nearly caused a broadcasting accident, and she collapsed immediately after the performance, requiring an IV treatment at a nearby hospital.

Due to their demanding local and international schedules, the group officially announced that they would not participate in year-end ceremonies or award shows. Afterwards, the song became a staple on the setlist for most T-ara tours and concerts, including Jewelry Box ~ First Japan Tour, Treasure Box ~ Second Japan Tour, and the T-ara Great China Tour, among others.

=== Reception ===
T-ara's performances of "Cry Cry" received praise from critics and fans alike. Yang Ja-young from Hankyung highlighted the group's ability to capture the audience's attention with a "magnificent stage presence". She described the stage as grand, noting how the members set a neat and sophisticated atmosphere in deep blue jackets. The reviewer particularly praised the moment during the performance when the members removed their jackets, revealing tight see-through blouses. She emphasized how the bold move added an extra layer of intensity to the stage.

== Reception ==
=== Commercial performance ===
Upon its release, "Cry Cry" topped all Korean digital charts achieving an All-Kill. The song peaked at number one on both the Gaon Digital Chart and Billboard Korea Hot 100. The song has sold 3,755,993 digital units in South Korea as of 2012, one of the best-selling Korean singles of the 2010s. (Note: Cumulative sales figures for "What's Wrong" in 2011 and 2012.) The ballad version of the song peaked at number 123 and 83 on Gaon Digital chart and the K-pop Hot 100 respectively selling over 90,000 digital copies by the end of November.

=== Critical reception ===
"Cry Cry" received mostly positive reviews from critics. Yang Ja-young from Hangkyung, praised its live performances emphasizing the bold choreography and intense stages. She also notes how these performance not only showcased their musical talent but also solidified T-ara’s position as one of the top girl groups of their time. In 2013, a reviewer from Bugs!, selected it as of one the best releases of 2011. In 2017, It was named the 6th best T-ara single by SBS PopAsia. In 2019, It was selected as one of the best K-pop song of all time by German magazine Popkultur. In 2024, NME ranked the song at No. 8 on its list of T-ara's best songs describing it as a "Heartbreak anthem".

== In popular culture ==
"Cry Cry" was re-recorded and released in China as part of a commercial campaign to promote the Beta-version of the online game World of Warships. A music video featuring Jiyeon and several scenes from the game was made available on various Chinese streaming platforms including QQ Music and Kugou. However, the song was never released to a global audience on platforms like YouTube or Spotify nor was it officially released in South Korea.

== Charts ==
=== Weekly charts ===
Chart (2011)	Peak position
South Korea (Gaon)	1 (Note: "Cry Cry" (Ballad Ver.) peaked at number 128 on the same chart.)
South Korea (K-pop Hot 100)	1 (Note: "Cry Cry" (Ballad Ver.) peaked at number 83 on the same chart.)
US World Digital Songs (Billboard)	8

=== Monthly charts ===
Chart (2011)	Peak position
South Korea (Gaon)	2

=== Year-end charts ===
Chart (2011)	Position
South Korea (Gaon)	48

== Sales ==
Total sales as of 2012
Country	Sales
South Korea (Gaon)	3,800,000 (Digital sales)
Japan (Oricon)	4,000 (DVD)

== Accolades ==
Music show wins
Music Show	Date	Ref.
M Countdown	December 1, 2011	
M Countdown	December 8, 2011	

=== Listicles ===
"Cry Cry" was named the 6th best T-ara single by SBS PopAsia and the eighth on NME list of T-ARA's best songs.

Year	Publisher	List	Rank	Ref.
2013	Bugs!	Best Songs of 2011	No order	
2019	Popkultur	The 82 Best K-Pop Songs of All Time	72	
2021	KKBOX Taiwan	Top K-pop songs of 2011	No order	

== Release history ==
Country	Date	Album	Distributing label	Format
South Korea	November 11, 2011	Black Eyes	Core Contents Media	Digital download
Worldwide	November 11, 2011	Black Eyes	Core Contents Media	Digital download
South Korea	January 11, 2012	Funky Town	Core Contents Media	Digital download
Worldwide	January 11, 2012	Funky Town	Core Contents Media	Digital download
China	October 29, 2015	World of Warships	Banana Culture	Digital download
