= We Were in Love (T-ara song) =

2011 single by T-ara and Davichi

- Digital cover

Single by: T-ara; Davichi

from the album Funky Town
- Language: Korean
- Released: December 23, 2011
- Recorded: 2011
- Genre: K-pop; Ballad
- Length: 3:33
- Label: Core Contents Media
- Composer: Cho Young-soo
- Lyricist: K-Smith

T-ara; Davichi; singles chronology
"Cry Cry" (2011)	"We Were in Love" (2011)	"Lovey-Dovey" (2012)

Music video
- "We Were in Love" on YouTube

"We Were in Love" (Korean: 우리 사랑했잖아) is a collaboration single recorded by South Korean girl groups T-ara and Davichi, It was released on Christmas Eve as a surprise single. It was later re-released on T-ara's fourth EP, Funky Town. The song achieved commercial success, becoming a chart topper on both the Gaon Chart and Billboard Korea Hot 100 chart. It also emerged as one of the best-selling Korean singles of the 2010s, amassing nearly 2.7 million downloads as of 2012 in South Korea. (Note: Cumulative sales figures for "We Were In Love" in 2011 and 2012.)

== Background and release ==
A snippet of "We Were In Love" was played at the end of the "Lovey Dovey" drama music video. It was official released for streaming and download in South Korea, on December 23, 2011. Although credited as T-ara, the song only features members Jiyeon, Hyomin, Soyeon and former member Hwayoung.

In 2021, "We Were In Love" was covered by Vietnamese singer Thanh Duy and Han Sara.

== Composition ==
Written by K-Smith and Cho Young-soo, "We Were In Love" is a poignant ballad characterized by its melancholic melody, blending orchestral strings, a gentle piano arrangement, and subtle acoustic guitar, with the violin and piano serving as the central instrumental themes.

== Music videos ==
=== Background and release ===
As a surprise single, there were no teasers released for "We Were In Love". The official music video premiered on December 22, 2011, on South Korean media player GOMTV. It featured four T-ara members; Soyeon, Hyomin, Jiyeon and former member Hwayoung, along with Davichi members; Kang Mink-yung and Lee Hae-ri. The music video for the song has reached over 100 million YouTube views as of June 2024.

=== Synopsis ===
The music video for "We Were In Love" features T-ara and Davichi members in emotional, reflective settings. The video alternates between scenes of the members reminiscing about happy moments with their past lovers and the sorrow they feel after the breakup. Soft lighting and melancholy expressions highlight the themes of heartbreak, while the video concludes with the members accepting the end of their relationships.

== Promotion and live performances ==
Due to its release coinciding with the promotion periods of "Cry Cry" and "Lovey Dovey", "We Were In Love" was only performed for two weeks on SBS's Inkigayo.The song premiered on SBS's New Year's special on January 1, 2012.

== Reception ==
=== Commercial performance ===
Upon release, "We Were In Love" quickly topped digital charts on various streaming platforms such as Soribada, Mnet, and Bugs!, achieving an "all-Kill". The track soared to number one on Gaon weekly chart and at claimed the number two spot on Billboard Korea's Hot 100. By 2012, It had sold over 2,688,000 digital units, emerging as one of the best-selling Korean singles of the 2010s. Additionally, the song was ranked as the ninetieth best-selling single on Bugs!'s mid-year chart for 2012, eventually finishing at number sixteen on the yearly chart. The song also received a nomination for first place on Mnet's M Countdown.

=== Critical reception ===
In 2012, "We Were In Love" earned a nomination for Best Collaboration at the 14th Mnet Asian Music Awards. The following year, In 2013, a reviewer from Bugs!, selected "We Were In Love" recognized the song as one of the standout releases of 2012.

== Charts ==
=== Weekly charts ===
Chart (2011-12)	Peak position
South Korea (Gaon Digital Chart)	1
South Korea (K-pop Hot 100)	2

=== Monthly charts ===
Chart (2012)	Peak position
South Korea (Gaon Digital Chart)	4

=== Year-end charts ===
Chart (2012)	Peak position
South Korea (Gaon Digital Chart)	80

== Sales ==
Digital sales as of 2012
Country	Sales
South Korea (Gaon)	2,688,000

== Awards and nominations ==
Award ceremony	Year	Category	Nominee / work	Result	Ref.
Mnet Asian Music Awards	2012	Best Collaboration	"We Were In Love"	Nominated	

== Release history ==
Country	Date	Album	Distributing label	Format
South Korea	December 23, 2011	Single	Core Contents Media	Digital download
Worldwide	December 23, 2011	Single	Core Contents Media	Digital download
South Korea	January 11, 2012	Funky Town	Core Contents Media	Digital download
Worldwide	January 11, 2012	Funky Town	Core Contents Media	Digital download
