= Tiamo =

2016 single by T-ara

Single by T-ara

from the EP Remember
- Language: Korean
- Released: November 9, 2016
- Recorded: 2016
- Genre: K-pop; dance-pop
- Length: 3:23
- Label: Dreamus
- Composers: Duble Sidekick, EastWest
- Lyricists: Long Candy, Full8loom
- Producer: Park Jang-geun

T-ara singles chronology
"So Crazy" (2015)	"Tiamo" (2016)	"What's My Name?" (2017)

Music video
- Tiamo on YouTube; Tiamo (Chinese ver.) on YouTube

"Tiamo" (Korean: 띠아모) is a single recorded by South Korean girl group T-ara, released on November 9, 2016, by MBK Entertainment and distributed by Interpark. It served as the lead track for the group's eighth extended play, Remember. This is the final release featuring members Soyeon and Boram before they would later leave the group in 2017.

The song represented a shift in the group's musical direction, moving from their signature upbeat dance tracks to a more emotional, mid-tempo ballad. In China, "Tiamo" topped both YinYueTai and Tudou's weekly charts, some of the country's largest streaming platforms. The song's success in the country contributed to T-ara being nominated for Artist of the Year and Group of the Year at the 5th V Chart Awards, where they won the latter.

The music video for "Tiamo" became T-ara's fastest to reach 1 million views on YouTube at the time, and broke the record for reaching 130 million views on Tudou within less than a week. Additionally, it was named the best K-pop music video of 2016 by Fuse Music.

== Background and release ==
In October 14, 2016, T-ara announced that they would be releasing their first mini-album in one year and three months, scheduled for release in November. The official release date was set on November 9. On November 1, it was revealed that the lead single would be titled "Tiamo", described as a medium-tempo track. Throughout the preparation process, the group actively shared updates with fans on V Live. On November 4, T-ara released a teaser video, accompanied by jacket photoshoot images. A second teaser followed on November 7.

On November 8, a day before the album's release, T-ara shared a handwritten letter with their fans, expressing their excitement and gratitude: "Everyone, it's been a long time~ You've waited a long time, right? One year and three months have already passed." They addressed their Korean fans, acknowledging their patience and anticipation. The letter continued: "'Tiamo' will finally be revealed in 12 hours... we are very nervous. Thank you for waiting... Let's make many happy memories! – T-ara".

To celebrate the release, a special live broadcast titled "Tiamo Special Live" was held on November 8 at 10:30 PM KST via V APP, allowing T-ara to interact with their international fanbase. The broadcast surpassed 700,000 likes during its airing.

"Tiamo" was officially released digitally on November 9, 2016. The music video premiered on V Live at 12:00 AM KST and was later uploaded to MBK Entertainment's YouTube channel at 12:00 PM KST. Additionally, to cater to their global audience, T-ara released a Chinese version of the song.

== Composition ==
Tiamo" was composed by Duble Sidekick, a production team known for their work with T-ara on previous solo releases. They have also produced hits like APINK's "Mr. Chu", SISTAR's "Give It to Me", and B.A.P's "Crash". The song features a mellow blend of piano, guitar, and strings layered over a pop beat, creating a warm and refreshing atmosphere. Unlike T-ara's signature high-tempo dance tracks, "Tiamo" takes a more dramatic and sentimental approach, showcasing a softer and more emotional side of the group's musical style.

== Creative direction ==
=== Concept and themes ===
Unlike their previous comebacks, "Tiamo" was not heavily promoted through excessive variety shows appearances. Instead, T-ara opted for a more artistic and authentic approach, conducting in-depth offline interviews with various Korean newspapers such as Newsen, TV Daily, and Sports Donga. The interviews focused on the album's creative direction, production choices, and career reflections.

The members revealed on Radio Star that "Tiamo" was primarily a song dedicated to their fans. Though it was not considered a full comeback, they viewed it as an opportunity to create lasting memories with their audience. Initially, they found the song underwhelming, but over time, they grew to love it, especially as it matched the winter season's ambiance. They emphasized that the lyrics were particularly meaningful, symbolizing a "secret code" between T-ara and their long-time fans. "Tiamo" is derived from the Italian phrase for "I love you".

=== Production ===
T-ara described "Tiamo" as a significant transformation from their usual high-energy dance tracks. This comeback marked their most mature release since debut. For production, they collaborated with Duble Sidekick, a producer the members deeply admired, having worked with him on past solo songs.

Crafting a choreography that fit the song's sentimental tone was a challenge. Eventually, they decided to incorporate sign language gestures into the routine, with the chorus symbolizing "our own password". According to the members, the choreography was intentionally kept simple yet graceful. For styling, T-ara selected elegant, feminine stage outfits to showcase the song's warm and wintery feel.

== Music videos ==
=== Background and release ===
The first teaser for "Tiamo" was released on November 4, 2016, featuring Jiyeon standing in a field of swaying reeds with tears in her eyes. On November 5, MBK Entertainment unveiled behind-the-scenes footage of the music video. A second teaser followed on November 7, showcasing a Christmas-themed setting where T-ara danced in the snow.

The official music video premiered on November 9, debuting on V Live at 12:00 AM KST and later on MBK Entertainment's YouTube channel at 12:00 PM KST. Directed by Lee Gi-Baek, who would go on to direct T-ara's "What's My Name" music video in 2017. To accommodate their international audience, a Chinese version of the music video was initially scheduled for release on November 14 but was delayed due to unforeseen factors. It was eventually released on November 18, 2016.

=== Synopsis ===
In the music video for "Tiamo," the group performs the song in various settings in both indoor and outdoor scenes. The visuals feature dramatic lighting and choreography. Interspersed with the performance shots are scenes that showcase love, longing, and separation, mainly played by Jiyeon. The narrative suggests a romantic relationship filled with intense emotions, as the members express both vulnerability and strength.

=== Critical reception ===
In February 2016, "Tiamo" was chosen as the best K-pop music video of 2016 by Fuse Music.

=== Commercial performance ===
"Tiamo"'s music video achieved significant commercial success upon its release. It quickly surpassed 1 million views on YouTube within 24 hours. In China, the video topped YinYueTai's Realtime Chart and maintained the number one position on the weekly chart for four consecutive weeks, earning a perfect 100% score—a notable achievement for a South Korean female artist. On Tudou, China's largest video-sharing platform, the video reached the top of the charts and accumulated over 130 million views within the first week. It reached 120 million views in just five days.

== Promotion and live performances ==
Unlike their previous comebacks, "Tiamo" was not heavily promoted through excessive variety shows appearances. Instead, T-ara opted for a more artistic and authentic approach, conducting in-depth offline interviews with various Korean newspapers such as Newsen, TV Daily, and Sports Donga. Thee interviews focused on the album's creative direction, production choices, and career reflections.

T-ara began the promotion of their album with a release showcase on November 9, 2016, at Blue Square Samsung Hall, coinciding with the album's release date. During the event, the group performed "Tiamo" along with other tracks from the album and a hit medley. The showcase was broadcast live on V Live. Girl group DIA attended the showcase.

The group continued their promotion on South Korean music shows, including SBS's Inkigayo, and The Show, MBC's Show! Music Core and KBS's Music Bank, starting on November 10, 2016; and concluding November 29, 2016. T-ara debuted "Tiamo" on Mnet's M Countdown on November 10, 2016, where they brought six young children on stage during the performance, with members visibly emotional and shedding tears at the closing. Additionally, T-ara performed "Tiamo" at major events such as the 2016 Super Seoul Dream Concert, KBS Hope Concert, and 2016 V LIVE End-year concert. On March 18, 2017, the group performed the song during their headlining set at the 12th Seoul Girls Collection. The live performances received positive feedback from critics, with Asia Media Tower noting their feminine charm, particularly in the pure white one-piece dresses that emphasized innocence.

== Reception ==
=== Commercial performance ===
"Tiamo" peaked at number 81 on the Gaon Weekly Digital Chart. and debuted at number 43 on Gaon Sales Chart.The song also reached number 10 on the Gaon Social Chart, where it remained for 89 weeks. Additionally, it ranked number 35 on the Bell chart, staying on the chart for 75 weeks. In China, "Tiamo" topped YinYueTai, the country's largest streaming platform, for 4 consecutive weeks. The song's success contributed to T-ara being nominated for the Artist of the Year and Group of the Year awards at the 5th V Chart Awards, where they won the latter category.

=== Critical reception ===
"Tiamo" received generally positive reviews from critics. News Fim praised T-ara's sophisticated and mature transformation with the song, noting its departure from the group's previous sexy concept and upbeat rhythms. The review highlighted how the song emphasizes femininity through its soft, lyrical melody, evoking faint emotions with relaxed choreography that complements the heartfelt lyrics. Hype Malaysia also commended the track for its contrast to T-ara's signature catchy, upbeat dance tunes. The review emphasized how "Tiamo" features a sweeter, mellower melody that shifts the focus to the group's vocals, showcasing a more delicate side of the members' musical abilities.

== Accolades ==
Awards and nominations for "Tiamo"
Award ceremony	Year	Category	Result	Ref.
V Chart Awards	2017	Artists of the Year	Nominated	
V Chart Awards	2017	Group of the Year	Won	

== Release history ==
Country	Date	Album	Distributing label	Format	Ref.
South Korea	November 9, 2016	Remember	MBK Entertainment	Digital download	
Worldwide	November 9, 2016	Remember	MBK Entertainment	Digital download	
