= Wonder Woman (Seeya, Davichi and T-ara song) =

- Digital cover

Single by Seeya, Davichi, T-ara
- Language: Korean
- Released: January 7, 2010
- Genre: K-pop
- Length: 3:37
- Label: Core Contents Media
- Lyricist: K.Smith
- Producer: Cho Young-soo

Davichi singles chronology
"Women's Generation" (2009)	"Wonder Woman" (2010)	"Time, Please Stop" (2010)

T-ara singles chronology
"Lies" (2009)	"Wonder Woman" (2010)	"We Are The One" (2010)

"Wonder Woman" (Korean: 원더우먼) is the second project single by South Korean girl groups SeeYa, Davichi, and T-ara released on January 7, 2010. It is a follow up to their previous single, "Women's Generation", with the music style continuing to revolve around themes of women's empowerment, hence the title. Although T-ara is officially credited on the single, only Eunjung and Hyomin participated in the song.

== Composition ==
The single, like its predecessor "Woman's Generation", was written by K. Smith. Production and composition was handled by Cho Young-soo.

== Commercial performance ==
"Wonder Woman" was an instant hit, peaking at number six on the Gaon Music Chart, and ranking at number 21 on the year-end Gaon chart in 2010 with 2,301,658 sales. At the time of its release, it was nominated for No. 1 on music show broadcasts.

== In popular culture ==
WSG Wannabe performed "Wonder Woman" (along with "Women's Generation") at their first concert, which was broadcast by MBC. According to Nielsen Korea (reported by MBC News), the highest rated part of the concert was the cover songs performance which achieved a rating of 7.0%, and videos of the performance exploded with popularity online, earning over 6 million views.

== Accolades ==
Award	Year	Category	Result	Ref.
Gaon Chart Awards	2010	Best Selling Ringtone	Won	

== Track listing ==
All lyrics are written by K.Smith; all music is composed by Cho Young-soo.

No.	Title	Length
1.	"Wonder Woman (Korean: 원더우먼)"	3:37

== Release history ==
Country	Date	Distributing label	Format
South Korea	January 7, 2010	Mnet Media	Digital download
