= Little Apple (song) =

2014 song by Chopstick Brothers

Single by Chopstick Brothers
- Language: Chinese
- Released: 29 May 2014
- Genre: Mandopop; Chinese folk
- Length: 3:31
- Label: Le Vision Pictures
- Songwriter: Wang Taili
- Producer: Wang Taili

Music video
- "Little Apple" on YouTube

"Little Apple" (simplified Chinese: 小苹果; traditional Chinese: 小蘋果; pinyin: Xiǎopíngguǒ) is a single by Chopstick Brothers, a duo of Wang Taili (王太利) and Xiao Yang (肖央), released as a promotional song for the movie Old Boys: The Way of the Dragon. Since its release, it has quickly attained great popularity in Chinese cyberspace, making it a widespread internet meme and a global hit, with parodies, flash mobs and covers from around the world.

== Lyrics ==
The music and lyrics are written as two stanzas of ten verses each, with each stanza followed by an 8-verse refrain which repeats. The simple and intentionally sentimental lyrics for the first stanza translates as:

I planted a seed that finally bore fruit/ Today is a great day
I give the stars to you, I give the moon to you/ Raise the sun everyday for you
I'll turn into a candle and let myself burn/ Just to shine a light on you
I'll give everything I have to you/ As long as you're happy
You give me new meaning everyday/ Though life is short, I'll love you forever, never abandoning you.

The refrain which repeats after each of the two stanzas is translated as:

You are my little apple/ I can never love you too much
Your red face warms my heart/ Lighting the fire, fire, fire, fire, fire in my life
You are my little apple/ Like the most beautiful cloud in the sky
Spring arrives again, and flowers bloom all over the mountainside/ I reap the hopes that I sowed.

== Music video ==
The music video of the song on Youku shows scenes of a square dance, interwoven with several short stories about love and romance resultant of a male partner's disapproval of his girlfriend's appearance, resulting in a failed attempt at plastic surgery. It contains elements from 1950s Korea and the legends of Adam and Eve and uses Chinglish in an expressive manner to portray the underlying tension of appearance. The square dance in the music video has also gained popularity in the public. Bae Seul-ki also starred in the video.

A video of the Korean-language cover of "Little Apple" by K-pop girl group T-ara, featuring Chopstick Brothers, exists.

== Reception ==
The song became famous shortly after its release on 29 May 2014. Since release, its music video has been adapted into various parodies by the public. However, some critics have criticized the song for its low artistic value.

== Chart performance ==
This song has also attained high positions in main online charts in China. It peaked at number one in the CCTV Global Chinese Music Chart (Chinese: 全球中文音乐榜) released every Saturday.

This song, referred to by one commentator as a "brainwashing song", also brings up the psychological factors that contribute to its success—its simple rhythm and lyrics cause the "earworm effect", forcing people to listen to it over and over again, and another reason that lied underneath is the "snowball effect", which means that people tend to follow others in a trend, suggesting that some people may not actually like the song, but just blindly following others.

== Covers ==
=== Army recruitment video ===
China's Ministry of National Defense released a video with the song on 27 July 2014, as a part of their recruitment campaign for the Army. The video features footage of soldiers dancing the square dance in the original music video, plus some scenes from the Army's training sessions and some words of encouragement.

=== T-ara version ===
"Little Apple"

Single by T-ara
- Released: 24 November 2014
- Genre: K-pop
- Length: 4:09
- Label: MBK Entertainment
- Songwriters: K-Smith, Wang Taili
- Producer: Shinsadong Tiger

T-ara singles chronology
"Sugar Free" (2014)	"Little Apple" (2014)	"So Crazy" (2015)

South Korean girl band T-ara released a Korean/Chinese cover of "Little Apple", featuring Chopstick Brothers, on 24 November 2014. The song was produced by Shinsadong Tiger and was released as a digital single by MBK Entertainment and distributed by KT Music. Chopstick Brothers were also featured in T-ara's music video. For reasons unknown, members Soyeon and Boram did not participate in the official recording of the cover, but would eventually join the rest of the group in live performances and concerts with their own recorded parts.

The music video for the cover was directed by Cho Soo-hyun, the same director who directed the music video for Gangnam Style by PSY. The music video features members Hyomin, Jiyeon, Eunjung, and Qri, with cameos by Kim Dani, Cho Seung-hee of F-ve Dolls, and Chopstick Brothers. The video hit 8 million views in only a day and a half on Tudou, China's largest video sharing platform at the time. The song also topped Tudou's chart.

The release of the cover by T-ara received very positive reception and lots of attention in China, beginning their large success as one of the most popular K-pop girl groups in the Chinese music industry.

This is the first time that a K-pop artist has released a cover version of a C-pop song. NME has included the song on its list of T-ara's best songs.

=== Other versions ===
Strawberry, May Ng and Stella Chen of RED People, otherwise known as Amoi-Amoi, released a cover version of the song, including various Malaysian fruits. The video includes scenes of Chopstick Brothers' original music video as well as T-ara's music video. Norwegian Power Metal artist PelleK uploaded a cover of this song on his YouTube channel Pellekofficial on January 14, 2015, in a metal style and has been both complimented and criticized for his pronunciation of Chinese words.

== Awards ==
- American Music Awards of 2014: International Song Award
- Mnet Asian Music Awards 2014: Favorite Music in China

When "Little Apple" won the International Song Award at the November 2014 AMA's, the Chopstick Brothers along with 2 others actually gave a live lip-synched performance of it. However, American viewers didn't see it because it was done during a commercial break.

== In video games ==
In 2015, Ubisoft from China have manufactured the music video game named 舞力全开2015 (Chinese version of Just Dance 2015), which the song appeared in video games has officially landed on Xbox One at the national profession version. The national profession version have added 5 Chinese songs for players in mainland China are: "Little Apple" (小苹果) by Chopstick Brothers, "Dancing Diva" (舞娘) by Jolin Tsai, "Us Under the Sunshine" (阳光下的我们) by Wanting Qu, "High Light High Life" (娱乐天空) by Eason Chan, and "Let It Go" (随他吧) by Hu Wei Na. The national profession version have also released for the PlayStation 4, however, the video games manufactory have removed away 1 song track.
