= What's My Name? (T-ara song) =

2017 single by T-ara

Single by T-ara

from the EP What's My Name
- Language: Korean
- Released: June 14, 2017
- Recorded: 2017
- Genre: K-pop; Dance-pop; EDM
- Length: 3:32
- Label: MBK Entertainment; Interpark
- Composers: Brave Brothers; 2Champ
- Lyricists: Brave Brothers; CHAKUN
- Producer: Kim Jeong-min

T-ara singles chronology
"Tiamo" (2016)	"What's My Name?" (2017)	"Tiki Taka" (2021)

Music video
- What's My Name? on YouTube

"What's My Name?" (Korean: 내 이름은), is a single recorded by South Korean girl group T-ara released on June 14, 2017, by MBK Entertainment and distributed by Interpark. It served as the lead track for the group's ninth extended play, What's My Name?. This is the first release without members Soyeon and Boram after their dispute with their label. A Mandarin Chinese version of the song was also released.

== Background and release ==
On March 6, 2017, MBK Entertainment, T-ara's label, revealed that the group would be making a comeback in early May with a new EP. A few days later, it was reported that the release would be the last as a six-member group, since the members' contracts would expire in May. On March 20, the agency revealed that a six-minute medley of the group's past singles would be included on the album, honoring their career as a six-member group. Later on, MBK updated that members Soyeon and Boram would not renew their contract, and that the upcoming album would be their last. It was also confirmed that the group would not be disbanding.

On April 25, MBK announced that the initial May 17 release was postponed to June 1, in order "to put the finishing touches to the new album". It was also revealed that, although members Soyeon and Boram's contracts would expire on May 15, they will be joining the promotions as scheduled. On May 6, MBK finally stated that "while settling the details on the comeback, we were unable to come to a satisfactory agreement with Boram and Soyeon, and their plans to join this album have fallen through", confirming that the group would return as a four-member group with members Qri, Eunjung, Hyomin and Jiyeon.

On May 16, it was revealed that the remaining members had re-recorded their new song for their June comeback. On May 29, through a V Live from the group's album photoshoot, the members set the release date to June 14. They also shared that they would be performing on M Countdown the next day and that the new song would be called "What's My Name?" and would be produced by Brave Brothers. On June 3, the group revealed that the new album would consist of seven songs, three group songs, and four solo songs. A Chinese version of the title track would also be included. On June 5, a music video was released, previously shown on the official fan club site. The EP and the single were released on June 14, 2017, through several music portals, including MelOn, and iTunes, for the global market.

== Composition ==
"What's My Name?" is a vibrant pop dance track produced by Brave Brothers, known for their previous collaborations with T-ara, including their 2015 single "So Crazy". The producer also worked with member Hyomin on her solo release "Sketch". Blending tropical influences with an energetic EDM beat, the song delivers T-ara's signature dance sound.

== Music videos ==
On May 16, it was reported that the group would be filming their music video in Paju, Gyeonggi, South Korea. The first for the music video premiered on May 31, 2017, via V Live and YouTube, followed by a second teaser on June 9, 2017. The official music video for "What's My Name?" was initially released on the group's official fan club site on June 5, before becoming publicly available. However, due to a delay on YouTube, where it was uploaded nine hours after the album's release, unauthorized users leaked and reuploaded the video ahead of its official premiere.

The music video portrays T-ara members reminiscing about their lives and careers in various locations before reuniting at the end, where they write their wishes and place them in bottles. Symbolic imagery, such as empty spaces, unoccupied chairs, and unused pens, subtly alludes to the absence of Boram and Soyeon. The music video for "What's My Name?" peaked at number one on YinYueTai, China's largest music-sharing platform. It maintained its position for eight weeks and garnered 630,000 views in less than two days.

== Promotion and live performances ==
T-ara began the promotion of their album with a release showcase on June 14, 2017, at Shinhan Card Fan Square, coinciding with the album's release date. During the event, the group performed "What's My Name?" along with other tracks from the album. The showcase was broadcast live on V Live. T-ara revealed that the signature choreography move, using the thumb and index finger to form a name tag shape, symbolized the song's title, "What's My Name?".

The group continued their promotion on South Korean music shows, including SBS's Inkigayo, and The Show, MBC's Show! Music Core and KBS's Music Bank, starting on June 5, 2017, and concluding on July 2, 2017. Hankyul, a future member of BAE173, performed as a backup dancer while training under MBK Entertainment at the time. On June 20, T-ara won their first music show trophy in over five years for "What's My Name?" on SBS MTV's The Show.

Additionally, T-ara performed "What's My Name?" at major events such as KBS Open Concert, Soribada Best K-Music Awards, and K-Pop Music Wave Festival In Malaysia. On September 10, 2017, they participated in the Incheon K-pop Concert, attended by 40,000 people. Their performance received widespread praise, drawing attention for the loud fan chants and enthusiastic audience participation, with fans singing along to their songs.

== Reception ==
=== Critical reception ===
"What's My Name" received positive critical acclaim. Jeff Benjamin of Fuse TV praised the single for maintaining the energetic charm of T-ara's past dance tracks while incorporating a captivating glitch-pop production layered with a profound sense of melancholy. He speculated that the lyrics might serve as a heartfelt message to fans, expressing the group's hope for continued support and recognition, even if this marked their final appearance.

=== Commercial performance ===
"What's My Name" debuted at number 79 on the Gaon Digital Chart, with 25,716 downloads sold. The song ended up ranking at number 79 on Bugs' Top 100 songs of 2017 (2nd half settlement). Internationally, the music video for "What's My Name?" peaked at number one on YinYueTai, China's largest music-sharing platform. It maintained its position for eight weeks and garnered 630,000 views in less than two days.

The group won their first music show trophy in over five years since "Lovey Dovey" from the album Funky Town on February 17, 2012. They achieved this milestone with their title track on June 20, 2017, on SBS MTV's The Show.

== Awards and nominations ==
Awards and nominations
Award ceremony	Year	Category	Result	Ref.
Mnet Asian Music Awards	2017	Mwave Global Fans' Choice	Nominated	
Soribada Best K-Music Awards	2017	Hallyu Popularity Award	Nominated	
Soribada Best K-Music Awards	2017	Main Prize (Bonsang)	Won	
MTV Best of the Best Awards	2017	China Choice Award	Won	

Music show win for "What's My Name?"
Program	Date	Ref.
The Show	June 20, 2017	

== Credits ==
- Jiyeon, Hyomin, Eunjung, Qri – Vocals
- Brave Brothers – Lyrics, composition
- 2Champ – composition, arrangement
- CHAKUN – Lyrics

== Charts ==
Chart (2017)	Peak position
South Korea (Gaon)	79

== Release history ==
Country	Date	Format	Distributing label	Ref.
Various	June 14, 2017	Digital download	MBK Entertainment	
