= Remember (EP) =

EP by T-ara
- Released: November 9, 2016
- Genre: Pop; R&B
- Length: 16:59
- Language: Korean; Mandarin
- Label: MBK; Interpark
- Producer: Duble Sidekick; Eastwest; Park Hyunjoong; Peter Pan; Long Candy; SEION

T-ara chronology
So Good (2015)	Remember (2016)	What's My Name (2017)

Singles from Remember
- 1. "Tiamo" Released: November 9, 2016

Music video
- TIAMO on YouTube

Remember is the eighth extended play by South Korean girl group T-ara. It was released on November 9, 2016, by MBK Entertainment and distributed by Interpark. This is the final release featuring members Soyeon and Boram, who left the group in 2017.

== Background and release ==
In October 2016, T-ara announced they would be releasing a new mini-album produced by Duble Sidekick in November. In October 2016, the mini-album's release date was announced for November 9. On November 1, it was announced that the lead single would be titled "Tiamo", based on how to say "I love you" in Italian, and that it would be a medium tempo track. T-ara then officially released the EP, containing five tracks, including the lead single "Tiamo". The music video for "Tiamo" was released on the V Live app at 00AM KST and on the YouTube channel at 12PM KST.

== Commercial performance ==
Remember entered and peaked at number 4 on the Gaon Album Chart in the chart issue dated November 13–19, 2016. In its second week, the EP fell to number 15 and dropped off the chart the following week. The EP entered the chart at number 18 in November 2016, with 16,015 physical copies sold, and a total of 17,977 copies by the end of 2016.

The music video for "Tiamo" hit 1 million views in a day on YouTube and 130 million views within a week on Tudou in China. The music video eventually reached 1 billion views, becoming the most viewed MV by a Korean artist on the platform.

== Track listing ==
Digital download
No.	Title	Lyrics	Music	Arrangement	Length
1.	"Tiamo"	Long Candy; Jinli	Duble Sidekick; Eastwest	Eastwest	3:23
2.	"Hurt Only Until Today" (오늘까지만 아파할 거야; oneulkkajiman apahal geoya)	Park HyunJoong; Peter Pan	Park HyunJoong; Peter Pan	Park HyunJoong	3:14
3.	"Farewell Movie" (이별 영화; ibyeol yeonghwa)	Duble Sidekick; Long Candy; SEION	Duble Sidekick; Long Candy; SEION	Eastwest	3:36
4.	"Tiamo" (Chinese version)	Long Candy; Jinli	Duble Sidekick; Eastwest	Eastwest	3:23
5.	"Tiamo" (instrumental)		Duble Sidekick; Eastwest	Eastwest	3:23
Total length:					16:59

== Charts ==
Remember chart history
Region	Peak
South Korea Weekly	4
South Korea Monthly	18

Yearly charts peaks
Region	Peak
China	17

== Sales ==
Remember Physical Sales
Region	Sales
South Korea	17.977

== Lists ==
Publisher	Year	List	Recipient	Rank	Ref.
Fuse	2016	Best K-Pop Music Video of 2016	"Tiamo"	1st	

== Release history ==
Region	Date	Format	Label	Ref.
South Korea	November 9, 2016	CD	MBK Entertainment; Interpark	
South Korea	November 9, 2016	Digital download	MBK Entertainment	
Worldwide	November 9, 2016	Digital download	MBK Entertainment	
