= Women's Generation =

- Digital cover

Single by Seeya, Davichi, T-ara
- Language: Korean
- Released: May 6, 2009
- Genre: Dance; pop
- Length: 10:35
- Label: OGAM Entertainment
- Lyricist: K.Smith
- Producer: Cho Young-soo

Davichi singles chronology
| "8282" (2009) | "Women's Generation" (2009) | "Time, Please Stop" (2010) |

T-ara singles chronology
| "Women's Generation" (2009) | "Lies" (2009) |

"Women's Generation" (Korean: 여성시대) is the debut project single by South Korean girl groups SeeYa, Davichi, and T-ara, released on May 6, 2009. It focuses on themes of women's empowerment. Although T-ara is officially credited on all tracks, only Ji-yeon participated in the singing and performances. Following the success of Women's Generation, a second special project single, "Wonder Woman", was released a year later, featuring SeeYa, Davichi, and T-ara members Hyomin and Eun-jung.

== Background and release ==
On April 21, Core Contents Media announced that Davichi and Seeya would release a special project single. However, controversy arose due to Seeya member Nam Gyu-ri's legal dispute with the agency following her sudden departure from the group. Jiyeon, a member of the newcomer group T-ara, joined the project to represent her group. Her participation led to speculation that she would become a new member of SeeYa, but CCM denied the rumors, confirming that she would remain in T-ara. "Women's Generation" was later re-released as a CD-only track on SeeYa's album Rebloom on October 26, 2009.

== Composition ==
The single, consisting of three tracks, was written by K. Smith, with production and composition handled by Cho Young-soo. It included the title track "Women's Generation", an alternate version titled "Forever Love", and a remix of the latter. "Forever Love" shared the same melody as "Women's Generation" but featured different lyrics and part distribution.

== Reception ==
=== Commercial performance ===
"Women's Generation" topped Mnet chart and peaked at number three on Melon. "Forever Love" and its remix also charted, with the original reaching the top 10.

The song peaked at two on KBS's Music Bank and other music programs, but never secured a trophy. "Women's Generation" ranked 31st on Melon's year-end chart for 2009 and placed fourth in mobile downloads for the year.

=== Critical reception ===
In May, 2009, The Korea Economic Daily praised Davichi and T-ara's stages, highlighting their powerful and refreshing vocals, colorful costumes, and captivating choreography.

== Promotion and live performances ==
"Women's Generation" was performed for the first time on May 7 on Mnet's M Countdown and then on several weekly music show programs including SBS's Inkigayo and KBS's Music Bank until June. The unit also occasionally performed the rest of the tracks.

== In popular culture ==
In 2009, it was played on MBC's Cinderella Man. In the same year, it was used in the mobile game Music Factory. In 2013, the song was performed by Cho Hang-jo on KBS2's drama Wang's Family. At their first concert, WSG Wannabe performed "Women's Generation" (along with "Wonder Woman"); the concert was broadcast by MBC. According to Nielsen Korea (reported by MBC News), the highest rated part of the concert was the cover song's performance, which achieved a 7.0% rating.

In October 2022, the song was selected as both the opening and closing theme for film Ajumma. According to the film's director Huh Shu-ming, the song describes well the protagonist's situation as a passionate mother. "I made it while thinking about what kind of life my mother would have lived if she hadn't devoted herself to me".

== Accolades ==
In 2023, "Women's Generation" was selected as one of the best K-pop hits from the 2000s by Tidal.

Awards and nominations
| Award | Year | Category | Result | Ref. |
|---|---|---|---|---|
| Melon Music Awards | 2009 | Song of the Year | Nominated | |
| Melon Music Awards | 2009 | Mobile Music Award | Nominated | |

== Track listing ==
All lyrics are written by K.Smith; all music is composed by Cho Young-soo.

| No. | Title | Length |
|---|---|---|
| 1. | "Women's Generation" | 3:22 |
| 2. | "Forever Love" | 3:32 |
| 3. | "Forever Love (Remix)" | 3:33 |
| Total length: | | 10:37 |

== Release history ==
| Country | Date | Distributing label | Format |
|---|---|---|---|
| South Korea | May 6, 2009 | OGAM Entertainment | Digital download |
| South Korea | October 26, 2009 | OGAM Entertainment | CD |
