= Like the First Time =

2009 song by T-ara

Single by T-ara

from the album Absolute First Album
- Language: Korean
- Released: November 27, 2009
- Recorded: 2009
- Genre: K-pop; dance-pop
- Length: 4:05
- Label: Mnet Media
- Composers: Bang Si-hyuk, Wonderkid
- Lyricist: Bang Si-hyuk

T-ara singles chronology
"Bo Peep Bo Peep" (2009)	"Like the First Time" (2009)	"You Drive Me Crazy" (2010)

Music video
- "Like the First Time" on YouTube

"Like the First Time" (Korean: 처음처럼; MR: Ch'ŏŭmch'ŏrŏm) is a song recorded by South Korean girl group T-ara, released on November 27, 2009, as part of their first Korean studio album, Absolute First Album. The song peaked at number ten on the newly launched Gaon Chart, marking T-ara's sixth top-ten entry. It was ranked as one of the best-selling singles of 2010, with nearly 1.9 million downloads.

== Background and release ==
The promotion of Absolute First Album emphasized dual concepts designed to showcase T-ara's versatility. While the title track, "Bo Peep Bo Peep" highlighted a "charismatic" image, the B-side track "Like the First Time" was presented as "colorful yet classic," reflecting the group's intent to appeal through contrasting charms.

Upon the album's release, Core Contents Media conducted an online poll in order to determine the lead single. Nearly 9,000 respondents from Melon, Cyworld, and Soribada, among others, were given the choice between "Bo Peep Bo Peep" and "Like the First Time", the latter of which won the poll by 53 percent. However, management chose "Bo Peep Bo Peep" as the label intended to present a "180-degree transformation" of T-ara's image. The choreography was done by Yama & Hotchicks, who also choreographed "Bo Peep Bo Peep".

The song was re-released on Absolute First Album's re-issue Breaking Heart on February 23, 2010. On October 10, 2012, "Like the First Time" was featured on T-ara's first greatest hits album, T-ara's Best of Best 2009–2012: Korean ver along with its music video on the DVD set. It was also recorded in Japanese and released on August 7, 2013, on the group's second Japanese album Treasure Box.

== Music video ==
=== Release and synopsis ===
On November 27, 2009, a 45-seconds teaser for the music video was released online. The music video for "Like the First Time" premiered on November 27, 2009, on South Korean media player GOMTV. It wasn't until November 30, 2013, that the music video was officially released on YouTube, licensed by 1thek. The video humorously depicts a country girl's makeover into a polished, sophisticated woman to impress her blind date.

=== Critical reception ===
In a review published on November 27, 2009, an editor for Chosun highlighted T-ara's transformation from the "cute sexy bunny girl" concept of "Bo Peep Bo Peep" to "retro girls," embracing 70s and 80s disco-inspired hairstyles and fashion. The review particularly praised Hyomin, dubbed the "goddess pose," for her expressive performance, including scenes where she dons black horn-rimmed glasses and pigtails, which added charm to the narrative.

== Promotion and live performances ==
"Like the First Time" was scheduled to be promoted in January 2010, yet their appearances quickly ceased as main vocalist So-yeon contracted H1N1, as did promotions for Absolute First Album as a whole. Jiyeon, was also absent due to filming for the drama Master of Study.

== Reception ==
=== Commercial performance ===
"Like the First Time debuted at number ten on Gaon weekly singles chart. It was also one of the best-selling singles of 2010 nearly 1.9 million downloads. It also ranked as the 8th biggest song of the year by streaming service Bugs!, based on streams and downloads from November 5, 2009 to November 3, 2010.

=== Critical reception ===
"Like the First Time" received mainly positive reviews. In 2010, Park Chan-ki of Helco Media praised T-ara's shift to a mature, sexy concept as a strong step toward maturity, highlighting the one-shoulder mini dresses, tube tops, and thigh-high boots which exuded confidence, while the retro glam waves in their hair completed the bold look. The reporter also noted T-ara's choice of subtle, mini-sized jewelry, setting them apart from other girl groups like 4Minute and 2NE1, with their understated, clean approach that showcased their natural charm. Director Lee Kot-nim of Jun Oh Hair also noted, “While the glam look is central, the makeup emphasizes femininity with soft cat-eye accents and a pink lip color, balancing the bold outfits and showing both elegance and sexiness.”

In September 2013, an editor for Bugs!, selected the song as one of the best songs from 2010. In 2017, Jacques Peterson of SBS PopAsia "Like the First Time" as among the group's best singles. Members Qri, Hyomin, and Eun-jung have named the song as their all-time favorite track. In 2024, NME ranked side-track the song at number four on its list of T-ara's best songs to date describing it as an understated cut from their debut album. Tidal has also placed the song among the best K-pop songs from the 2000s.

== Release history ==
Country	Date	Version	Distributing label	Format
South Korea	November 27, 2009	Absolute First Album	Mnet Media	Digital download
South Korea	March 3, 2010	Breaking Heart	Mnet Media	Digital download
