= TTL (Time to Love) =

Single by T-ara, Supernova

Single by T-ara, Supernova

from the album Absolute First Album
- Language: Korean
- Released: September 15, 2009
- Genre: Hip hop; dance; electronica
- Length: 3:38
- Label: Mnet Media
- Composer: Lee Sangho
- Lyricists: Hwang Sung-jin; Rhymer; Joosuc
- Producer: Kim Do-hoon

T-ara singles chronology
"Lies" (2009)	"TTL (Time to Love)" (2009)	"Bo Peep Bo Peep" (2009)

Alternative cover
- "TTL Listen 2" digital cover

"TTL (Time to Love)" is the first collaboration single released by South Korean groups T-ara and Supernova. The single was released digitally on September 15, 2009. It was re-released on T-ara's first album Absolute First Album and later on its re-issue Breaking Heart. An alternate/remix version of the song titled "TTL Listen 2" was released a month later.

== Background and release ==
"TTL (Time to Love)" is the first project single between T-ara and Supernova. Although both groups are credited on the song, only So-yeon, Eun-jung, Hyomin, and Jiyeon (from T-ara) and Kwangsoo, Jihyeok, and Geonil (from Supernova) participated in the song. Bo-ram and Qri starred in the music video instead. It was Supernova's first release in two years.

The single's success prompted Core Contents Media to produce the sequel entitled "TTL Listen 2", an alternate/remix version of TTL. It was released on October 9 featuring all members from both groups. Originally it was scheduled to be released on the 13th, but due to high fan demands, the groups' agency, CCM, decided to release it 4 days ahead of schedule. Both songs were re-released on T-ara's first album Absolute First Album and later on its re-issue Breaking Heart. The Japanese version of "TTL (Time to Love)" was included in T-ara's first Japanese album. This version is sung only by the members of T-ara. A remixed Japanese version was released on the group's third Japanese album Gossip Girls in 2014.

== Commercial performance ==
"TTL" was an instant hit topping all Korean charts upon release including Cyworld's BGM chart and Nate's ringtone chart. It ended up as one of the best performing songs of the year, despite being released in September. It ranked at number 15 on Melon's yearly chart and at number 9 on Dosirak. It also re-charted on the newly launched Gaon's digital singles in 2010.

The music video reached over 110,000 views and climbed up to number 1 on GOMTV's chart within a day of its release and reached over 1.1 million views in its first two weeks. "TTL Listen 2" also charted on the top popular music videos, 30 minutes after release with over 50,000 views.

== Promotion and live performances ==
"TTL" was performed for the first time on Mnet's M Countdown on September 17. The groups performed "TTL Listen 2" for the first time at the annual Dream Concert on October 10, 2009.

T-ara and Supernova held a special concert titled Time To Love Concert in Japan on June 3, 2010, at Yokohama Britz Hall. The event was sponsored by local restaurant chain Gusto as part of promoting their new Korean menu. They advertised the food chain starting from March of the same year. The concert was attended by more than 1,000 spectators. A total of nine songs were performed at the concert. The two groups held the second "Time To Love Concert" in Japan on October 19, 2012 at the Tokyo International Forum.

== In popular culture ==
In October 2009, the song was chosen as the theme for the commercial film promoting Gusto; one of the largest restaurant chains in Japan with 1,000 stores nationwide. T-ara and Supernova acted as models for the campaign receiving ₩1 billion (~US$900,000) each as compensation. A press conference was held to commemorate the launch of the campaign with about 140 Japanese media officials, including TBS TV, participating in the contract-signing ceremony. The song made its game debut on Japanese game Pop'n Music.

In 2010, Japanese singer Nami Tamaki remade the song for her album Missing You~Time to Love. In 2017, It was covered by Vietnamese singers Liz Kim Cuong and Ivone on TV HUB's Liveshow 4.

== Accolades ==
In 2017, SBS PopAsia named "TTL (Time to Love)" number 1 in their list of the best T-ara singles while NME has included it on its list of T-ara's best songs. Amazon Music selected "TTL (Time to Love)" as one of the greatest K-Pop hits of the 2000s.

Year	Award ceremony	Category	Result	Ref.
2009	Cyworld Digital Music Awards	Ting's Choice Artist	Won	
2009	Melon Music Awards	Current Stream Award	Nominated	

== Charts ==
Chart (2010) (Note: The Circle chart was only established in 2010; therefore only re-entries from 2010 onwards are available.)	Peak position
South Korea (Circle)	168
