= Lies (T-ara song) =

2009 single by T-ara

- "Lies" digital cover

Single by T-ara

from the album Absolute First Album
- Language: Korean
- B-side: "Wanna Play?"
- Released: July 27, 2009
- Genre: K-pop, dance-pop, ballad, electronic, blues, funk, soul
- Length: 14:17
- Label: Dreamus, MBK Entertainment
- Songwriters: Cho Yeong-su, Kim Taehyun
- Composer: Ahn Young-min

T-ara singles chronology
"Women's Generation" (2009)	"Lies" (2009)	"TTL (Time to Love)" (2009)

"Lies" (Korean: 거짓말; RR: Geojitmal) is the debut single by South Korean girl group T-ara. It was released on July 27, 2009. The song was later included on both T-ara's Korean debut album Absolute First Album and Japanese debut album Jewelry Box. The song earned the group their first career award at the Cyworld Digital Music Awards.

== Background and release ==
"Lies" marks the group's first release since the departure of pre-debut members Jiae and Jiwon. On July 20, still cuts from the music video were released. On July 24, the teaser videos for "Want to Play?" and "Lies" were released.

On July 21, controversy arose after "Wanna Play" was leaked on MBC's Taeyeon's Chin Chin Radio. T-ara's agency, Core Contents Media, strongly protested the leak, but the damage had already been done. They revealed that ₩370 million had been invested in T-ara's debut, only for it to be spoiled due to incompetence. As a result, the music video for "Wanna Play" was never released.

"Lies", "Wanna Play?" and "Lies (Ballad Version)" were all included on T-ara's debut Korean album Absolute First Album as well as its re-package Breaking Heart. "Lies" was re-recorded in Japanese and released on the Japanese single Roly Poly (Japanese Version) on February 29, 2012, and later on the group's debut Japanese album Jewelry Box on June 6, 2012. It also appeared on their greatest hits album T-ARA's Best of Best 2009–2012 ~Korean ver on October 17, 2012, and on their special compilation album TARA's Free Time in Paris And Swiss on October 22, 2012.

== Composition ==
The single consists of 4 tracks in total. 2 version of "Lies" which only differ by the intro. "Lies Part.1" starts with a dramatic high-note, it is also the one featured on the music video, while "Lies Part.2" starts with a mid-tempo beat. "Lies Part.2" was the only one performed live.

The B-side track is "Wanna Play?" has a more funky vibe than "Lies". It is about T-ara's confident debut and urges people to enjoy the group's music. T-ara described as their introductory song.

The last song, is a ballad version about "Lies". It contains the same lyrics but has additional rap parts performed by Hyomin

== Music videos ==
=== Background and release ===
On July 10, it was reported that actor Yoo Seung-ho would appear in the music video for "Lies". On July 20, still cuts from the music video were released. On July 23, Mnet's "The Making of T-ara" revealed the music video filming process. On July 24, the teaser videos for "Want to Play?" and "Lies" were released. Subsequently, the music video for "Lies (Ballad Ver.)" was released featuring scenes from member Jiyeon's horror drama Soul. On August 19, the music video for "Lies (Part 2)" was released with a lively summer concept.

On July 21, "Wanna Play" was leaked on MBC's Taeyeon's Chin Chin Radio, sparking controversy. T-ara's agency, Core Contents Media, condemned the incident, stating that ₩370 million had been invested in the group's debut, only for it to be ruined due to negligence. As a result, the music video for "Wanna Play" was never released.

=== Reception ===
On the 29th, the music video for "Lies". It exceeded 1 million views on GomTV within two weeks of its release, a first for a rookie, according to a GOMTV representative.

== Promotion and live performances ==
Unlike most singers who debut on regular weekly Korean music shows, T-ara made their debut with an appearance on the talk show Radio Star. The group later began their music show promotions, performing on programs such as KBS's Music Bank, Mnet's M Countdown, and SBS's Inkigayo. The B-side track "Wanna Play?" was occasionally performed with the single.

== Reception ==
=== Commercial performance ===
Additionally, the music video for "Lies", exceeded 1 million views on GomTV within two weeks of its release, a first for a rookie, according to a GOMTV representative. The song earned the group its first career award at the Cyworld Digital Music Awards.

=== Critical reception ===
T-ara's debut was made amid an influx of girl groups on the Korean pop music scene. A writer for the Korean Sisa Journal remarked that the old-school trot influence of "Lies" did little to appeal to core consumers of the girl group market; those who found nostalgia in 1990s groups like S.E.S. and Fin.K.L. The music style and performances were described as "unconventional" by critics. However, the song gradually found its way to top of Korean charts. Actor Yoo Seung Ho praised "Lies" commending the members for their vocal abilities.

== Tracklisting ==
All lyrics are written by Ahn Young Min; all music is composed by Cho Young Soo.

No.	Title	Lyrics	Music	Length
1.	"Lies (Part.1) (거짓말)"	Ahn Young Min	Cho Young Soo	3:48
2.	"Lies (Part.2)"	Ahn Young Min	Cho Young Soo	3:44
3.	"Wanna Play? (놀아볼래)"	Ahn Young Min	Cho Young Soo, Kim Tae Hyun	2:55
4.	"Lies (Ballad Ver.)"	Ahn Young Min	Cho Young Soo	3:57
Total length:				14:17

== Awards and nominations ==
Year	Award ceremony	Award	Recipient	Result	Ref
2009	Cyworld Digital Music Awards	Rookie of The month	"Lies" (Song)	Won	
