= So Good (T-ara EP) =

EP by T-ara
- Released: August 4, 2015
- Recorded: 2015
- Genre: K-pop; dance-pop; ballad
- Length: 16:34
- Language: Korean; Chinese
- Label: MBK

T-ara chronology
And & End (2014)	So Good (2015)	Remember (2016)

Singles from So Good
- 1. "So Crazy" Released: August 4, 2015

Music video
- So Crazy on YouTube

So Good (stylized as SO GOOD) is the seventh extended play by South Korean girl group T-ara. It was released on August 4, 2015 by MBK Entertainment.

== Release ==
In July 2015, it was revealed that the group would be returning with a new album the following month and that the group are ready for their Chinese promotions and that they have been starting to work on their new Chinese album since the start of the year.

On August 4, T-ara promoted their comeback with the single "So Crazy". On August 12, the group started their promotions in China with the song "So Crazy (Chinese Version)" and also released a music video.

== Reception ==
So Crazy received generally positive reviews from critics, specifically, the project's concepts and outfits were seen as revolutionary and were selected by several critics as a defining fashion moment. In 2019, Glamour UK included So Crazy sailor outfits as one of the greatest fashion moments in K-Pop history that helped change the fashion industry forever.

=== Commercial performance ===
So Good sold more than 8,000 on its first day of release according to Hanteo. It debuted at number 5 on the Gaon Album Chart, on the chart issue dated August 9–15, 2015. In its second week, the EP peaked at number 4. The EP entered at number 8 on the chart for the month of August 2015, with 20,629 physical copies. The EP sold 20,695 physical copies in 2015, placing at number 74 for the year-end chart.

So Crazy was a huge success in China, topping YinYueTai, the country's largest video streaming platform. The song also holds the record for the first and T-ara as the only Korean girl group to achieve a perfect 100% score on the said chart. The song peaked at 33 in South Korea and sold over 100,000 copies in the country.

== Track listing ==
Digital download

No.	Title	Lyrics	Music	Arrangement	Length
1.	"So Crazy" (완전 미쳤네; Korean Ver.)	Brave Brothers; Galactika	Brave Brothers; Galactika	Galactika	03:20
2.	"So Crazy" (완전 미쳤네; Chinese Ver.)	Brave Brothers; Galactika	Brave Brothers; Galactika	Galactika	03:20
3.	"The Reason Why We Broke Up" (우리 헤어진 이유)	Monster Factory; Polar Bear	Monster Factory; Polar Bear	Monster Factory; Polar Bear	03:42
4.	"For You"	Monster Factory; Polar Bear	Monster Factory; Polar Bear	Monster Factory; Polar Bear	03:32
5.	"So Crazy" (완전 미쳤네; Inst.)		Brave Brothers; Galactika	Brave Brothers; Galactika	03:20

== Charts ==
Chart (2015)	Peak position
South Korea (Gaon Weekly Album Chart)	4
South Korea (Gaon Monthly Album Chart)	8
South Korea (Gaon Year-end Album Chart)	74

== Sales ==
Region	Sales
South Koea (Gaon)	20,695

== Listicles ==
Year	Publisher	List	Recipient	Placement	Ref.
2015	Idolator	Best K-Pop Songs of 2015	So Crazy	9th	
2015	FM	K-Pop Top 40 Music Videos of 2015	So Crazy	1st	
2017	SBS PopAsia	9 of the best T-ara singles	So Crazy	9th	
2021	Glamour UK	23 of the greatest fashion moments in K-Pop history	So Crazy	19th	

== Release history ==
Region	Date	Format	Label
South Korea	August 4, 2015	CD, digital download	MBK Entertainment, Interpark Music
Worldwide	August 4, 2015	Digital download	MBK Entertainment, Interpark Music
