= What's My Name? (EP) =

- Digital Edition cover

EP by T-ara
- Released: 14 June 2017
- Genre: K-pop; EDM; retro
- Length: 30:11
- Language: Korean
- Label: MBK Entertainment; Interpark

T-ara chronology
Remember (2016)	What's My Name? (2017)	Re:T-ara (2021)

Singles from What's My Name?
- 1. "What's My Name?" Released: 14 June 2017

What's My Name? is the ninth extended play by South Korean girl group T-ara. It was released on 14 June 2017, by MBK Entertainment and distributed by Interpark. The EP was released in six versions: a normal edition containing the group songs; an edition of each member with their solo songs; and a digital edition with all the songs, group and solo. A music video for the title track was also released on 14 June. This is the first release since the departure of members Soyeon and Boram and the final release by T-ara under MBK Entertainment. The EP peaked at number four on the Gaon Album Chart. The various versions of the EP have sold over 39,453 physical copies combined as of July 2017.

== Background and release ==
On 6 March 2017, MBK Entertainment revealed that the group would be making a comeback in early May with a new EP. A few days later, it was reported that the release would be the last as a six-member group, since the members' contracts would expire in May. On 20 March, the agency revealed that a six-minute medley of the group's past singles would be included on the album, honoring their career as a six-member group. Later on, MBK updated that members Soyeon and Boram would not renew their contract, and that the upcoming album would be their last. It was also confirmed that the group would not be disbanding.

On 25 April, it was informed that the initial 17 May release was postponed to 1 June, in order "to put the finishing touches to the new album". It was also revealed that, although members Soyeon and Boram's contracts would expire on 15 May, they will be joining the promotions as scheduled. On 6 May, MBK finally stated that "while settling the details on the comeback, we were unable to come to a satisfactory agreement with Boram and Soyeon, and their plans to join this album have fallen through", confirming that the group would return as a four-member group with members Qri, Eunjung, Hyomin and Jiyeon.

On 16 May, it was reported that the group would be filming their music video in Paju, Gyeonggi, South Korea, on 17 May for their new song. It was also revealed that the remaining members had re-recorded their new song for their June comeback. On 29 May, through a V Live from the group's album photoshoot, the members set the release date to 14 June. They also shared that they would be performing on M Countdown the next day and that the new song would be called "What's My Name?" and would be produced by Brave Brothers. On 3 June, the group revealed that the new album would consist of seven songs, three group songs, and four solo songs. A Chinese version of the title track would also be included. On 5 June, a music video was released, previously shown on the official fan club site. The EP and the single were released on 14 June 2017, through several music portals, including MelOn, and iTunes, for the global market.

== Composition ==
The mini-album is composed of nine tracks. A title track "What's My Name?" accompanied by a Chinese and an instrumental version. a dance track, "Reload", a ballad track "20090729", and an individual track for each member: "Diamond" (Qri), "Ooh La La" (Hyomin), "Real Love" (Eunjung), and "Lullaby" (Jiyeon).

"What's My Name?" is a vibrant pop dance track produced by Brave Brothers, known for his previous collaborations with T-ara, including their 2015 single "So Crazy". The producer also worked with member Hyomin on her solo release "Sketch". Blending tropical influences with an energetic EDM beat, the song reportedly delivers T-ara's signature dance sound. "20090729", the third track off the album, refers to T-ara's debut date.

At the release showcase, Jiyeon revealed that the group held several concept meetings with the label and producer to decide on the album's songs and themes. Eunjung revealed that the EP reflects a lot of the members' opinions. The members also chose their own solo tracks. Speaking about her solo song, "Real Love", Eunjung stated that she never got to experiment with her sound, which is why she's proud of this track that shows a different side of her.

== Promotion ==
The group held a showcase on June 14, 2015 to commemorate the album's release at Shinhan Card Fansquare in Seogyo-dong, Seoul. The group held their first comeback stage on Mnet's M Countdown on 15 June, performing their title track "What's My Name?". They continued on KBS's Music Bank on 16 June, MBC's Show! Music Core on 17 June, and SBS's Inkigayo on 18 June. The group won their first music show trophy in more than five years for their title track on 20 June, on SBS MTV's The Show.

== Reception ==
=== Critical reception ===
"What's My Name" received positive reviews from music critics. Jeff Benjamin of Fuse TV praised the single for maintaining the energetic charm of T-ara's past dance tracks while incorporating a captivating glitch-pop production layered with a profound sense of melancholy. He speculated that the lyrics might serve as a heartfelt message to fans, expressing the group’s hope for continued support and recognition, even if this marked their final appearance. Additionally, Qri’s solo track, "Diamond," earned a spot among Billboard's critics' picks for K-Pop's Deep Cuts of the Decade, highlighting its artistry.

=== Commercial performance ===
The EP debuted at number 2 on Hanteo's real-time chart while Jiyeon's version debuted at 3 selling over 13,000 pure physical copies in the first hour of release. Two versions of What's My Name? charted at Gaon Album Chart, with the normal edition at number four and the Jiyeon version at number seven. All versions of the EP entered at the Gaon Album Chart of June 2017: the normal edition at number 14 with 14,538 copies; Jiyeon's version at number 16 with 9,151 copies; Hyomin's version at number 22 with 5,000 copies; Qri's version on at number 25 with 4,796 copies; Eunjung's version at number 26 with 4,707. For the month of July 2017: the normal edition sold 1,261 copies. The EP sold 39,453 physical copies combined alone in South Korea. In Japan, the album debuted with 522 copies, making the EP sales at nearly 40,000 copies in total. Internationally, the album debuted at number 1 on Billboard China's weekly album chart, a first for a South Korean girl group.

"What's My Name" debuted at number 79 on the Gaon Digital Chart, with 25,716 downloads sold. The song ended up ranking at number 79 on Bugs' yearly chart. It also appeared on multiple charts around the world including peaking at number 1 on Billboard China's weekly singles.

== Accolades ==
Billboard named "Diamond" number 18 in their list of the 40 Best K-Pop Deep Cuts of the Decade: Critics' Picks.

== Track listing ==
Digital Edition
No.	Title	Lyrics	Music	Arrangement	Length
1.	"What's My Name?" (내 이름은; nae ileum-eun)	Brave Brothers; Chakun	Brave Brothers; Two Champ; Chakun	Two Champ	3:32
2.	"Reload"	Lee Jieun	Bum; Sophiya; Magolpy; Kang Minsun	Bum; Kang Minsun	3:00
3.	"20090729"	Park Hyunjoon; Peter Pan	Park Hyunjoon; Peter Pan	Park Hyunjoon	3:55
4.	"Diamond" (다이아몬드; daiamondeu; Qri solo)	Mafly; Moon Sulley	Damon Sharpe; John Ho; Jeff Shum	John Ho; Jeff Shum	3:00
5.	"Ooh La La" (Hyomin solo)	Lee Jieun	Damon Sharpe; Jimmy Burney; Adam Kapit	Damon Sharpe; Adam Kapit	2:59
6.	"Real Love" (Eunjung solo)	Lee Jieun	Andrew Choi; Brian Cho; 220	Brian Cho; 220	3:22
7.	"Lullaby" (Jiyeon solo)	ZNEE	Bum; Sophiya; Kim Yongshin	Bum; Kim Yongshin	3:19
8.	"What's My Name?" (Chinese Ver.)	Brave Brothers; Chakun	Brave Brothers; Two Champ; Chakun	Two Champ	3:32
9.	"What's My Name?" (Inst.)		Brave Brothers; Two Champ; Chakun	Two Champ	3:32
Total length:					30:11

Normal Edition
No.	Title	Lyrics	Music	Arrangement	Length
1.	"What's My Name?" (내 이름은; nae ileum-eun)	Brave Brothers; Chakun	Brave Brothers; Two Champ; Chakun	Two Champ	3:32
2.	"Reload"	Lee Jieun	Bum; Sophiya; Magolpy; Kang Minsun	Bum; Kang Minsun	3:00
3.	"20090729"	Park Hyunjoon; Peter Pan	Park Hyunjoon; Peter Pan	Park Hyunjoon	3:55
4.	"What's My Name?" (Chinese Ver.)	Brave Brothers; Chakun	Brave Brothers; Two Champ; Chakun	Two Champ	3:32
5.	"What's My Name?" (Inst.)		Brave Brothers; Two Champ; Chakun	Two Champ	3:32
Total length:					17:31

Jiyeon Edition
No.	Title	Lyrics	Music	Arrangement	Length
1.	"Lullaby" (Jiyeon solo)	ZNEE	Bum; Sophiya; Kim Yongshin	Bum; Kim Yongshin	3:19
2.	"What's My Name?" (내 이름은; nae ileum-eun)	Brave Brothers; Chakun	Brave Brothers; Two Champ; Chakun	Two Champ	3:32
3.	"Lullaby" (Jiyeon solo; Chinese Ver.)	ZNEE	Bum; Sophiya; Kim Yongshin	Bum; Kim Yongshin	3:19
Total length:					10:10

Hyomin Edition
No.	Title	Lyrics	Music	Arrangement	Length
1.	"Ooh La La" (Hyomin solo)	Lee Jieun	Damon Sharpe; Jimmy Burney; Adam Kapit	Damon Sharpe; Adam Kapit	2:59
2.	"What's My Name?" (내 이름은; nae ileum-eun)	Brave Brothers; Chakun	Brave Brothers; Two Champ; Chakun	Two Champ	3:32
3.	"Ooh La La" (Hyomin solo; Chinese Ver.)	Lee Jieun	Damon Sharpe; Jimmy Burney; Adam Kapit	Damon Sharpe; Adam Kapit	2:59
Total length:					9:30

Qri Edition
No.	Title	Lyrics	Music	Arrangement	Length
1.	"Diamond" (다이아몬드; daiamondeu; Qri solo)	Mafly; Moon Sulley	Damon Sharpe; John Ho; Jeff Shum	John Ho; Jeff Shum	3:00
2.	"What's My Name?" (내 이름은; nae ileum-eun)	Brave Brothers; Chakun	Brave Brothers; Two Champ; Chakun	Two Champ	3:32
3.	"Diamond" (다이아몬드; daiamondeu; Qri solo; Chinese Ver.)	Mafly; Moon Sulley	Damon Sharpe; John Ho; Jeff Shum	John Ho; Jeff Shum	3:00
Total length:					9:32

Eunjung Edition
No.	Title	Lyrics	Music	Arrangement	Length
1.	"Real Love" (Eunjung solo)	Lee Jieun	Andrew Choi; Brian Cho; 220	Brian Cho; 220	3:22
2.	"What's My Name?" (내 이름은; nae ileum-eun)	Brave Brothers; Chakun	Brave Brothers; Two Champ; Chakun	Two Champ	3:32
3.	"Real Love" (Eunjung solo; Chinese Ver.)	Lee Jieun	Andrew Choi; Brian Cho; 220	Brian Cho; 220	3:22
Total length:					10:16

== Release history ==
Region	Date	Format	Label	Ref.
South Korea	14 June 2017	CD	MBK Entertainment; Interpark	
South Korea	14 June 2017	Digital download	MBK Entertainment	
Worldwide	14 June 2017	Digital download	MBK Entertainment	

== See also ==
List of Billboard China V Chart number-one albums of 2017
