= Sugar Free (T-ara song) =

2014 single by T-ara

- EDM Club Sugar Free Edition cover

Single by T-ara

from the EP And & End
- Language: Korean; English
- Released: September 11, 2014
- Recorded: 2014
- Genre: K-pop; dance-pop; EDM
- Length: 3:55
- Label: Dreamus
- Songwriters: Shinsadong Tiger; BeomXNang

T-ara singles chronology
| "Hide & Seek" (2013) | "Sugar Free" (2014) | "Little Apple" (2014) |

Music video
- Sugar Free on YouTube; Sugar Free (Ver. 2) on YouTube; Sugar Free (Ver. 3) on YouTube; Sugar Free (EDM Edition) on YouTube

"Sugar Free" (Korean: 슈가프리) is a single recorded by South Korean girl group T-ara. Released on September 11, 2014, it served as the lead track for the group's sixth extended play, And & End. Commercially, the song marked T-ara's highest career charting on Billboard's World Digital Song Sales chart. On September 24, a limited edition remix album featuring eight remixes and original demos was released. It also was the group's first and only song recorded in English.

"Sugar Free" earned T-ara the Group of the Year award at 3rd V Chart Awards and was nominated for the main prize (bonsang) and the Hallyu Special Award at the Seoul Music Awards. The music video received the Best Dance Video award at the 4th MTV Best of the Best Awards.

== Background and release ==
On August 6, 2014, it was announced that T-ara would be returning with a new album scheduled for release the following month. Their label, MBK Entertainment, later confirmed a mid-September release date. "Sugar Free" was officially released on streaming platforms on September 11, 2014.

=== EDM Club Sugar Free Edition ===
A remix album, titled EDM Club Sugar Free Edition, was released on September 24, 2014, showcasing various remixed versions of "Sugar Free" in both Korean and English. On October 9, a representative of T-ara revealed that the remix album was a limited edition, with an initial print run of only 7,000 copies. Despite receiving over 20,000 pre-orders, the company decided to produce just 2,000 additional copies, keeping it highly exclusive. Additionally, "Sugar Free (Chuckie Remix)", was released on October 7, 2014, and included as part of the limited edition album.

== Composition ==
"Sugar Free" is an EDM-inspired track in the Big Room genre characterized by its energetic beats and rap-style melody. The song was produced by Shinsadong Tiger, who previously collaborated with the group on hit tracks such as "Roly-Poly", "Lovey-Dovey", and "Number 9", alongside Beom & Nang. The EDM Club Sugar Free Edition album includes a total of 18 tracks, featuring remixes of "Sugar Free" in both Korean and English. The album also contains the original version of the song featuring, which features LE of EXID, and an additional remix by Dutch DJ Chuckie.

== Creative direction ==
According to Financial News, T-ara took an innovative approach for their comeback by embracing the Big Room genre with "Sugar Free", a high-energy style of electronic dance music. The song draws a parallel between an empty romantic relationship and a sugar-free drink. The group's signature choreography brings the lyrics to life, with dynamic movements highlighting the song's themes. Complemented by a flashy music video featuring vibrant visuals and stylish, on-trend outfits, the comeback captured attention for its modern and distinctive creative direction. The choreography for "Sugar Free" was created by Yama & Hotchicks dance studio, known for their work on several of T-ara's previous hits, including "Bo Peep Bo Peep", "You're Driving Me Crazy" and "Roly Poly".

== Music videos ==
=== Background and release ===
Three versions of the "Sugar Free" music video were simultaneously released on September 10, 2014, via YouTube. The videos premiered on Core Content Media's official YouTube channel, Genie Music's channel, and T-ara's official Facebook page. However, the version uploaded to Genie Music's channel was later deleted and never re-uploaded.

=== Critical reception ===
The Korean newspaper Sports Khan praised the music video for "Sugar Free", highlighting T-ara's members' dynamic performance and their ability to showcase a more mature and refined charm.. It received the Best Dance Video award at the 4th MTV Best of The Best Awards.

=== Commercial performance ===
According to Billboard, "Sugar Free" was the third most watched K-pop video globally in September 2014, and the fourth most-watched in the United States, ranking second among girl groups on both charts.

The song also achieved significant success in China, topping YinYueTai's weekly chart, the country's largest video-streaming platform. By May 2016, "Sugar Free" had become the second most-watched music videos on YinYueTai, amassing nearly 123 million views, surpassing PSY's "Gangnam Style". T-ara's 2013 single "Number Nine" held the top spot with approximately 133 million views.

== Promotion and live performances ==
"Sugar Free" was promoted on major South Korean music shows including Mnet's M Countdown, SBS's Inkigayo, KBS's Music Bank and MBC's Show! Music Core. The live performances received praise for their funky outfit choices, particularly the ripped jeans that exuded off a sense of freedom. The group was commended for delivering an attractive performance without resorting to excessive gestures. In a positive review by E Today, T-ara's Show! Music Core live stage was described as a "splendid performance", with the outlet praising their engaging choreography and stylish, form-fitting black and white jumpsuits.

On September 11, 2014, T-ara debuted "Sugar Free" at the 2014 Asian Games. Organized by the Ministry of Culture, Sports and Tourism, the event was attended by former government officials and several high-profile figures, including, former Prime Minister Chung Hong-won, Minister of Culture, Sports and Tourism Kim Jong-duck, President of the Korea Sports & Olympics Council Kim Jeong-haeng, heads of each sports organization, and heads of provincial and municipal sports associations. The song was also performed at the Daegu International Fashion Culture Festival and the Incheon Hallyu Tourism .Concert.

== Reception ==
=== Commercial performance ===
"Sugar Free" peaked at number 36 on Gaon's weekly chart and number 61 on its monthly chart. It debuted at number 4 on Billboard's Digital song sales chart, marking T-ara's highest-ranking song on the chart to date. By the end of October 2014, the song had sold nearly 122,000 digital copies. The EDM Club Sugar Free Edition remix album debuted at number 8 on Gaon' weekly album chart and at number 14 on the monthly chart. In Japan, the album entered Oricon's weekly album chart at number 181. Although it received 20,000 pre-orders, only 9,500 copies were produced due to its initial conception as a limited edition release.

=== Critical reception ===
"Sugar Free" received generally positive reviews from critics. Scott Interrante of PopMatters praised the song's use of synths, describing the "saccharine and overly processed" vocals as fitting perfectly with the song's overall vibe, concluding that "Sugar Free is as good as one could hope it to be.". The song was also ranked at No. 7 on NME's list of the best T-ara songs, with the publication highlighting its success in becoming a staple track in clubs across Asia..

== Usage in media ==
On February 5, 2016, "Sugar Free" (Big Room Ver.) was added to the playlist of the Japanese game Neon FM. The song had also been included in Pump It Up Prime 2's song list in 2014 and was featured again in 2016.

== Accolades ==
Awards and nominations
| Award ceremony | Year | Category | Result | Ref. |
|---|---|---|---|---|
| MTV Best of the Best Awards | 2014 | Best Dance Video | Won | |
| GQ Korea Awards | 2014 | This Year's Will | Won | |
| Mwave Global Awards | 2014 | Popularity Award | Won | |
| Seoul Music Awards | 2015 | Hallyu Special Award | Nominated | |
| Seoul Music Awards | 2015 | Main Prize (Bonsang) | Nominated | |
| Seoul Music Awards | 2015 | Popularity Award | Nominated | |
| V Chart Awards | 2015 | Artists of the Year | Nominated | |
| V Chart Awards | 2015 | Group of the Year | Won | |

=== Listicles ===
In 2014, Kenh14, a Vietnamese website, ranked "Sugar Free" at No. 12 among the best K-pop girl group girl-crush songs. In 2017, SBS's PopAsia Jeff Benjamen placed the song at No.8 his list of T-ara's best singles. Most recently, In 2024, "Sugar Free" was selected as the seventh-best T-ara song by UK magazine NME.

== Charts ==
=== Weekly charts ===
| Chart (2014) | Peak position |
|---|---|
| Japanese Albums (Oricon) | 181 |
| South Korea (Gaon) | 36 |
| South Korean Albums (Gaon) | 8 |
| US World Digital Songs (Billboard) | 4 |

=== Monthly charts ===
| Charts (October 2014) | Peak position |
|---|---|
| South Korea (Gaon) | 61 |
| South Korean Albums (Gaon) | 14 |

== Sales ==
Sales as of October 2014
| Country | Sales amount | Ref. |
|---|---|---|
| South Korea (Gaon) | 122,000 (digital) | |
| South Korea (Gaon) | 9,500 (physical) | |

== Release history ==
| Country | Date | Album | Distributing label | Format |
|---|---|---|---|---|
| South Korea | September 11, 2014 | And & End | Genie Music | Digital download |
| Worldwide | September 11, 2014 | And & End | Genie Music | Digital download |
| South Korea | September 24, 2014 | EDM CLUB Sugar Free Edition | Genie Music | Digital download |
| Worldwide | September 24, 2014 | EDM CLUB Sugar Free Edition | Genie Music | Digital download |
| South Korea | October 7, 2014 | “Sugar Free” (Chuckie Remix) | Genie Music | Digital download |
| Worldwide | October 7, 2014 | “Sugar Free” (Chuckie Remix) | Genie Music | Digital download |
