= You Drive Me Crazy (T-ara song) =

Single by T-ara

from the album Breaking Heart
- Language: Korean
- Released: February 23, 2010
- Recorded: 2010
- Genre: K-pop; dance-pop
- Label: Core Contents Media
- Songwriter: Wheesung
- Composers: Cho Young-soo, Kim Tae-hyun
- Producer: Kwon Chang-hyun

T-ara singles chronology
"Bo Peep Bo Peep" (2009)	"You Drive Me Crazy" (2010)	"Why Are You Being Like This?" (2010)

Music video
- "You Drive Me Crazy" on YouTube

"You Drive Me Crazy" (Korean: 너 때문에 미쳐; RR: Neo ttaemune micheo), also known as "I Go Crazy Because of You", is a single by South Korean girl group T-ara released on February 23, 2010. It served as a bonus track for the repackaged album Breaking Heart. The single became the group's first chart-topper on the Gaon Chart, and is one of the best-selling singles in South Korea with 3.04 million downloads.

== Background and release ==
In early February 2010, it was announced that T-ara would be re-releasing their album with two new songs in order to thank their fans for the success of their first album. Entitled Breaking Heart, the reissue centers around a "temptation of the devil" concept. Breaking Heart was physically released on March 3, 2010. The lead single, "You Drive Me Crazy", was penned by singer-songwriter Wheesung, with music by Cho Young-soo and Kim Tae-hyun. The choreography was done by Yama & Hotchicks, who also choreographed "Bo Peep Bo Peep" and "Like The First Time".

== Composition ==
"You Drive Me Crazy" (Note: The original Hangul title of the song is "너 때문에 미쳐", which is credited in English as either "You Drive Me Crazy" or "I Go Crazy Because of You".) was penned by singer-songwriter Wheesung, with music by Cho Young-soo and Kim Tae-hyun. It is an "edgy" electropop song which has received comparisons to "If U Seek Amy" by American singer Britney Spears. It has been called a "song without breaks" and is highlighted for the "important key role" that synthesizers play in "creating a hook song".

== Music video ==
=== Background and release ===
Filming for the music video, directed by Cha Eun-taek, began on February 18, 2010, in a Namyangju, Gyeonggi studio. Member Ji-yeon suffered a knee ligament injury during production, causing the other members to end their solo shoots with Ji-yeon finishing hers the next morning. The music video premiered on March 15, 2010, on GOMTV.

=== Commercial performance ===
The music video topped GOMTV's music chart, and reached 1 million views within a week of release.

== Promotion ==
Promotion for "You Drive Me Crazy" began on March 15, 2010.

== Reception ==
=== Commercial performance ===
"You Drive Me Crazy" peaked at number one on the Gaon Digital Chart, holding its position for two weeks. It sold 3 million downloads by the end of 2010 and ranked at number 16 on the annual chart.

=== Critical reception ===
Robbie Daw of Idolator drew comparisons to American singer Britney Spears, commenting: "the "Womanizer" beat, the "If U Seek Amy" melody and the wardrobe that looks like it was stolen from the storage unit housing the "...Baby One More Time" video shoot memorabilia. [...] You know, the line "you empower me, sexy shadow" is simply just not used enough in pop songs these days. So props for that, T-ara."

In 2017, SBS PopAsia, along with NME in 2024, named "You Drive Me Crazy" as among the group's best singles. KKBox Hong Kong also included it in their list of "The Best 10 classic K-pop songs of 2010".

== In popular culture ==
In July 2022, "You Drive Me Crazy" was played in the hit TV series Extraordinary Attorney Woo. In 2010, Japanese transgender TV personality Haruna Ai released a remake of the song titled "Crazy for You".

== Accolades ==
Awards and nominations
Award ceremony	Year	Category	Result	Ref.
Seoul Music Awards	2010	Bonsang Award	Nominated	
Seoul Music Awards	2010	Popularity Award	Nominated	

Program	Date	Ref.
M Countdown	March 18, 2010	
Inkigayo	March 21, 2010	
Inkigayo	March 28, 2010	

== Charts ==
=== Weekly charts ===
Chart (2010)	Peak position
South Korea (Gaon)	1

=== Monthly charts ===
Chart (2010)	Peak position
South Korea (Gaon)	3

=== Year-end charts ===
Chart (2010)	Position
South Korea (Gaon)	16

== Release history ==
Country	Date	Album	Distributing label	Format
South Korea	February 23, 2010	Breaking Heart	Core Contents Media	CD, digital
