= Bugs! (streaming service) =

South Korean streaming service

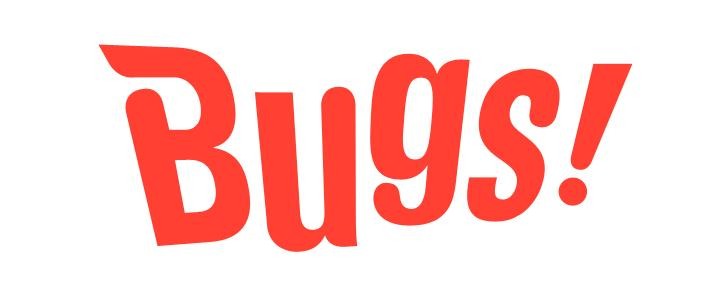
- Developer: NHN Entertainment Corporation
- Launch date: February 2000
- Platform: Cross-platform
- Availability: South Korea
- Website: music.bugs.co.kr

Bugs! (Korean: 벅스; RR: Beogseu; formerly known as SUPER SOUND Bugs!) is a South Korean subscription digital streaming service owned by NHN Entertainment Corporation. At the end of 2016, it held a 15% share of South Korea's music streaming market according to an IFPI survey of internet users.

== History ==
Bugs! was established in November 1999 and began operations as a subscription digital music service in February 2000. It is owned by NHN Bugs, an affiliate of South Korean IT company NHN Entertainment Corporation. By 2002, Bugs! became the largest streaming service in South Korea with over 9 million registered users.

== See also ==
- Line Music
- Melon (online music service)
- Naver VIBE
