= List of songs recorded by T-ara =

The following is a list of songs by the Korean girl group T-ara.

== List of songs ==
Key
†	Indicates single release

List of songs recorded by T-ara
Song	Artist(s)	Writer(s)	Album(s)	Year	Ref.
"20090729"	T-ara	Park Hyun-joon; Peter Pan	What's My Name?	2017	
"A-HA" †	T-ara	Takafumi Fujino	Gossip Girls	2014	
"ALL KILL" †	T-ara	Ahn Young-min; Cho Young-soo; Lee Yoo-jin	Re:T-ara	2021	
"Apple is A"	T-ara	Ahn Young-min; Cho Young-soo	Absolute First Album	2009	
"Apple is A" (Japanese ver.)	T-ara	Ahn Young-min; Cho Young-soo; Shoko Fujibayashi	Jewelry Box	2012	
"Beautiful Girl" †	T-ara feat. Electroboyz	Brave Brothers	—N/a	2011	
"Beautiful Sniper"	T-ara	Takafumi Fujino	Treasure Box	2013	
"Bo Peep Bo Peep" †	T-ara	Shinsadong Tiger; Choi Kyu-sung	Absolute First Album	2009	
"Bo Peep Bo Peep" (Japanese ver.) †	T-ara	Shinsadong Tiger; Choi Kyu-sung; Zoop	Jewelry Box	2012	
"Breaking Heart: Watashi ga Totemo Itakute" (Japanese ver.)	T-ara	Shinsadong Tiger; Choi Kyu-sung; Fujino Takafumi	Jewelry Box	2012	
"Bunny Style!" †	T-ara	Inoue Tomonori; MEG. ME	Treasure Box	2013	
"Bye Bye"	T-ara	Nam Ki-sang; Kang Jung-myung	Absolute First Album	2009	
"Bye Bye" (Japanese ver.)	T-ara	Nam Ki-sang; Kang Jung-myung; Ono Miyaichi Osamu	Jewelry Box	2012	
"Calendar" (지난 달력; Jinan Dallyeog)	T-ara	Roco; Rocoberry	And & End	2014	
"Cry Cry" †	T-ara	Kim Tae-hyun; Cho Young-soo; Ahn Young-min	Black Eyes	2011	
"Cry Cry" (Ballad ver.)	T-ara	Kim Tae-hyun; Cho Young-soo; Ahn Young-min	Black Eyes	2011	
"Cry Cry" (Japanese ver.)	T-ara	Kim Tae-hyun; Cho Young-soo; Ahn Young-min; Onomiya Ichino	Jewelry Box	2012	
"Dangerous Love"	T-ara	MEG. ME	Treasure Box	2013	
"Day and Night"	Areum feat. Gun-ji of Gavy NJ and Shannon	Ahn Young-min; Cho Young-soo	Mirage	2012	
"Day by Day"	T-ara	Ahn Young-min; Cho Young-soo; Kim Tae-hyun; K-SMITH	Day by Day	2012	
"Day by Day" (Japanese ver.)	T-ara	Ahn Young-min; Cho Young-soo; Kim Tae-hyun; K-SMITH; Hazama Tomoko	Treasure Box	2012	
"Deja-Vu"	T-ara	MEG.ME	Treasure Box	2013	
"Do You Know Me" †	T-ara	Shinsadong Tiger; Polar Bear´	Again (EP)	2013	
"Don't Get Married" †	T-ara	Duble Sidekick	Again (EP)	2013	
"Don't Leave" †	T-ara	Ahn Young Min; Cho Young Soo	Day By Day (EP)	2012	
"First Love (FT. EB)" †	T-ara	Cho Young-soo	All Star	2014	
"Geojitmal (Lies)" †	T-ara	Ahn Young-min; Cho Young-soo; Kim Tae-hyun	Absolute First Album	2009	
"Good Person"	T-ara	K-SMITH; Han Seung-ho	Cinderella Man OST; Absolute First Album	2009	
"Goodbye, OK" †	T-ara	Ahn Young-min; Cho Young-soo; Kim Tae-hyun	Black Eyes	2011	
"Hajimete no You Ni (Like The First Time)" (Japanese ver.)	T-ara	"hitman" bang Hazama Tomoko	Treasure Box	2012	
"Hide & Seek" †	T-ara	Park Deok-sang; Park Hyeon-jung	White Winter	2013	
"Hurt" †	T-ara	Kim Hee Sun; Baek Deok Sang	Again	2013	
"I Don't Know"	T-ara	Shinsadong Tiger; Choi Kyu-sung	Temptastic	2010	
"I Don't Want You" (남주긴 아까워; Namjugin Akkawo)	T-ara	Duble Sidekick; Radio Galaxi	And & End	2014	
"I Go Crazy Because of You"	T-ara	Cho Young-soo; Kim Tae-hyun; Wheesung	Breaking Heart	2010	
"I Know the Feeling"	T-ara	Baek Hyun Jung; Baek Deok Sang	Again	2013	
"I Really Really Like You"	T-ara	Nang Lee; Beom Lee	John Travolta Wannabe	2011	
"If I See Her" (그녀를 보면; Geunyeoleul Bomyeon)	T-ara	Conan; Roco	And & End	2014	
"I'm Okay"	T-ara	Choi Kyu-sung	Temptastic	2010	
"I'm Really Hurt"	T-ara	Shinsadong Tiger; Choi Kyu-sung	Breaking Heart	2010	
"I'm So Bad"	T-ara	Ahn Young-min; Kim Tae-hyun; Cho Young-soo	Black Eyes	2011	
"Just Now"	T-ara	TBA	Gossip Girls	2014	
"Keep Out"	T-ara	Park Deok-sang; Park Hyeon-jung; Onomiya Ichino	Jewelry Box	2012	
"Kimiwa Boku No Takaramono ～Happy Birthday to you～"	T-ara	MEG.ME	Treasure Box	2013	
"Kojinmaru: Uso" (Japanese ver.)	T-ara	Cho Young-soo; Kei	Jewelry Box	2012	
"Knockin' On My Heart"	T-ara	MEG.ME	Gossip Girls	2014	
"Keep On Walking"	T-ara	MEG.ME; Ogawa Kota	Gossip Girls	2014	
"LA'booN" †	T-ara	MEG.ME; Shoko Fujibayashi	Gossip Girls	2014	
"Lead the Way" †	T-ara	Okochi Kouta; Ono Miyaichi Osamu; Ichino Onomiya	Gossip Girls	2014	
"Like the First Time" †	T-ara	"hitman" bang	Absolute First Album	2009	
"Little Apple"(Korean ver.) †	T-ara	"hitman" bang	Little Apple	2014	
"Log-In" †	T-ara	Marco	—N/a	2011	
"Love Game"	T-ara	Park Deok-sang; Park Hyeon-jung; Kim Hee-sun	Day by Day	2012	
"Love Me!: Anata no Sei de Kurisou" (Japanese ver.)	T-ara	Cho Young-soo; Kim Tae-hyun; Onomiya Ichino, Zoop	Jewelry Box	2012	
"Lovey-Dovey"	T-ara	Shinsadong Tiger; Choi Kyu-sung	Black Eyes	2012	
"Lovey-Dovey" (Japanese ver.) †	T-ara	Shinsadong Tiger; Choi Kyu-sung; Shoko Fujibayashi	Jewelry Box	2012	
"Lucky Wannabee!" †	T-ara	Shoko Fujibayashi; Ahn Young-min	Gossip Girls	2014	
"Ma Boo"	T-ara	Kim Do-hoon; Rhymer	Temptastic	2010	
"Memories You Gave Me"(JINX OST)	T-ara		Gossip Girls	2014	
"MUSICA MUSICA"	T-ara	Fujino Takafumi	Gossip Girls	2014	
"Natgwa Bam (Love All)" †	T-ara, Gavy NJ and Shannon	Ahn Young-min; Cho Young-soo	Day by Day	2012	
'Neoneoneo (You You You)"	T-ara	Kim Do-hoon; Kim Ki-beom; Rhymer	Absolute First Album	2009	
Number Nine (No.9) (넘버나인)	T-ara	Shinsadong Tiger; Choi Gyu Sung	AGAIN	2013	
"ORGR"	T-ara	Shinsadong Tiger; 4th Hitter; S.Kim	And & End	2014	
"O My God"	T-ara	Choi Kyu-sung	Black Eyes	2011	
"One & One"	T-ara	Shinsadong Tiger; Choi Kyu-sung	Absolute First Album	2009	
"Reload"	T-ara	Lee Ji-eun; Bum; Sophiya; Magolpy; Kang Min-sun	What's My Name?	2017	
"Roly-Poly"	T-ara	Shinsadong Tiger; Choi Kyu-sung	John Travolta Wannabe	2011	
"Roly-Poly" (Japanese ver.) †	T-ara	Shinsadong Tiger; Choi Kyu-sung; Shoko Fujibayashi	Jewelry Box	2012	
"Roly-Poly in Copacabana" †	T-ara	Shinsadong Tiger; Choi Kyu-sung	John Travolta Wannabe	2011	
"Roly-Poly in Copacabana" (Japanese ver.)	T-ara	Shinsadong Tiger; Choi Kyu-sung; Shoko Fujibayashi	—N/a	2012	
"Round and Round"	T-ara	Park Geon-ho; Kim Myung-gon	Yeon Ga 2012	2011	
"Sexy Love"	T-ara	Shinsadong Tiger; Choi Kyu-sung	Day by Day	2012	
"Sexy Love" (Japanese ver.) †	T-ara	Shinsadong Tiger; Choi Kyu-sung; Shoko Fujibayashi	Treasure Box	2012	
"Shabontama no Yukue" (Soap Bubbles)	T-ara	Yamauchi Hikaru	Treasure Box	2013	
"Sign"	T-ara	MEG. ME; Hiroko Konishi	Treasure Box	2013	
"Sugar Free" †	T-ara	Shinsadong Tiger; Beomi Nangi; LE	And & End	2014	
"T-ARATiC MAGiC MUSiC"	T-ara	Kang Ji-won; Kim Ki-beom; Shoko Fujibayashi	Jewelry Box	2012	
"TIKI TAKA" †	T-ara	Colde basecamp Minit	Re:T-ara	2021	
"TTL Listen 2" †	T-ara and Supernova	Rhymer; Sangchu; Kim Do-hoon	Absolute First Album	2009	
"TTL (Time to Love)" †	T-ara and Supernova	Hwang Sung-jin; Rhymer; Joosuc; Kim Do-hoon	Absolute First Album	2009	
"TTL (Time to Love)" (Japanese ver.)	T-ara	HI-D; Kim Do-hoon	Jewelry Box	2012	
"TTL (Time to Love)" (Japanese ver.) DJ Hanmin Remix	T-ara		Gossip Girls	2014	
"Target" †	T-ara	MEG.ME; KOH	Treasure Box	2013	
"Tic Tic Toc"	T-ara	Ahn Young-min	Absolute First Album	2009	
"Wae Ireoni (Why Are You Being Like This?)" †	T-ara	Lee Eun-jin; Kim Do-hoon; Lee Sang-ho	Temptastic	2010	
"Wanna Play?"	T-ara	Kim Tae-hyun; Cho Young-soo; Ahn Young-min	Absolute First Album	2009	
"Wanna Play?" (Japanese ver.)	T-ara	Kim Tae-hyun; Cho Young-soo; Ahn Young-min	Treasure Box	2013	
"What's My Name" †	T-ara	Brave Brothers; Chakun; Two Champ	What's My Name	2017	
"We Are the One (16 Gang Giwon Eungwonga)" †	T-ara	Ahn Young-min; Cho Young-soo; Kim Tae-hyun	—N/a	2010	
"We Were in Love" †	T-ara and Davichi	Cho Young-soo; K-SMITH	Black Eyes	2011	
"Why Are You Being Like This?" (Japanese ver.)	T-ara	Ikuta Magokoro; Ahn Young-min; Cho Young-soo; Kim Tae-hyun	Jewelry Box	2012	
"Women's Generation" †	SeeYa, Davichi and T-ara	Cho Young-soo; K-SMITH	—N/a	2009	
"Wonder Woman" †	T-ara, SeeYa and Davichi	Cho Young-soo	—N/a	2010	
"Yayaya"	T-ara	E-Tribe	Temptastic	2010	
"Yayaya" (Japanese ver.) †	T-ara	E-Tribe; Takafumi Fujino	Jewelry Box	2012	
"하늘땅 별땅" †	T-ara	Lee Kyung Sub	TWENTYth Urban	2010	
