= T-ara discography =

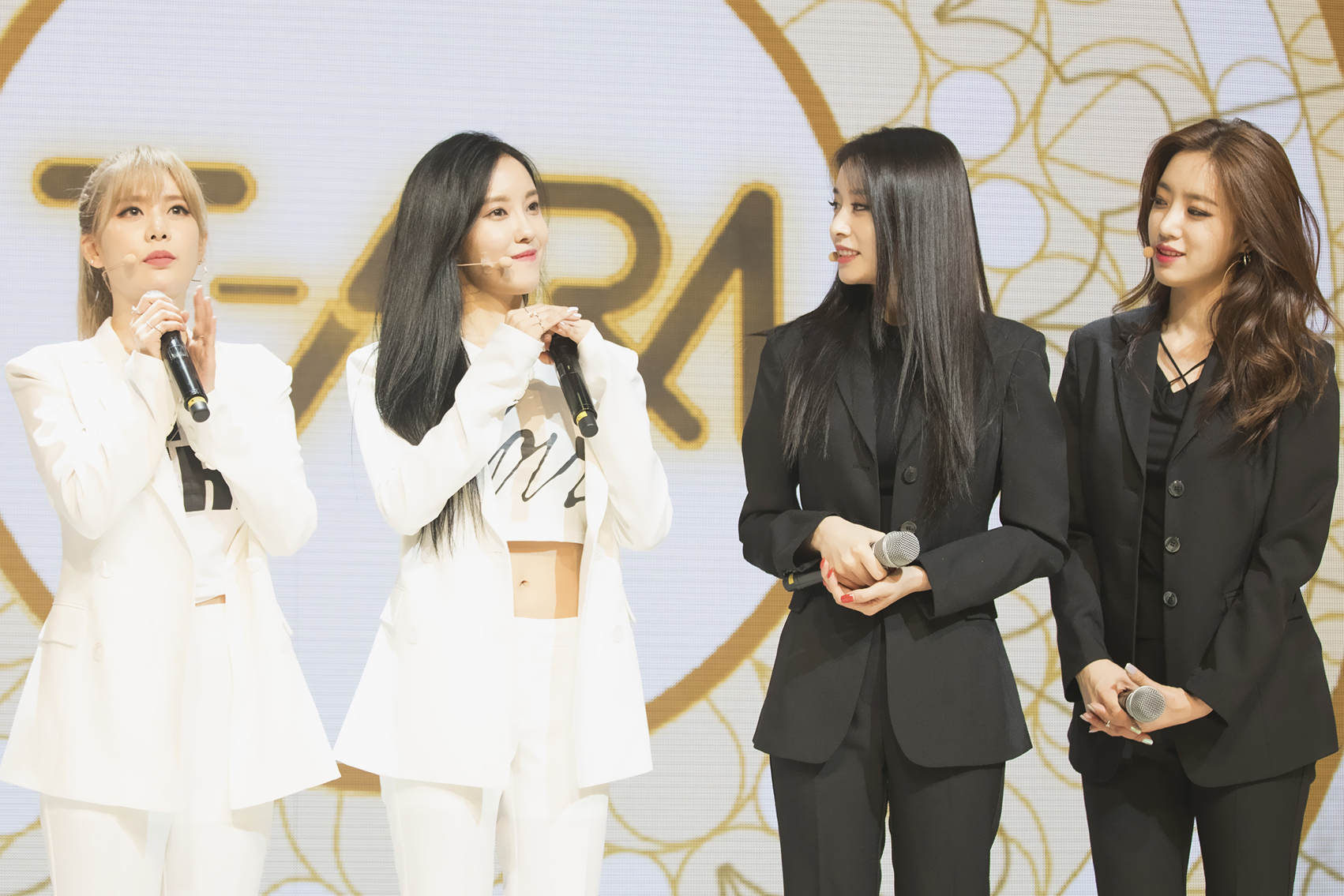
- T-ara in 2017; From left to right: Qri, Hyomin, Jiyeon and Eunjung
- Studio albums: 4
- Extended plays: 9
- Compilation albums: 2
- Singles: 29
- Single albums: 2
- Promotional singles: 12
- Reissues: 6

South Korean girl group T-ara has released four studio albums (one of which was re-released under a different title), nine extended plays (four of which were re-released under different titles), two compilation albums, two remix albums, two single albums, and thirty-six singles (including five collaboration singles), and six promotional singles. T-ara's debut studio album Absolute First Album (2009) peaked at number two on South Korea's Gaon Album Chart and yielded two South Korean top-ten singles, "Bo Peep Bo Peep" and "Like the First Time". Its 2010 reissue, Breaking Heart, reached number two in South Korea and spawned the number-one single "You Drive Me Crazy", which sold over three million digital downloads.

T-ara's first EP, Temptastic, was released in December 2010. The EP spawned two South Korean top-five singles, "What's Wrong" and "Yayaya". The group's 2011 EP John Travolta Wannabe peaked at number three on the Gaon Album Chart. Its single "Roly-Poly" peaked atop the Korea K-Pop Hot 100 chart and was the highest-selling digital single of 2011 in South Korea, with over four million digital downloads. The group earned a string of South Korean number-one singles in 2011 and 2012 with "Cry Cry", "We Were In Love", and "Lovey-Dovey", the last of which was the second best-selling digital single of 2012 in South Korea with over 3.7 million units sold.

The group's first Japanese-language album, Jewelry Box (2012), peaked at number two on the Japanese Oricon albums chart and was certified gold by the Recording Industry Association of Japan (RIAJ). Its lead single, the Japanese version of their 2009 Korean single "Bo Peep Bo Peep", peaked atop the Oricon singles chart and the Japan Hot 100, and was certified gold by the RIAJ. The same year, T-ara released an EP titled Day by Day, and its reissue titled Mirage. The singles "Day by Day" and "Sexy Love" both ranked among the top 100 best-selling singles of 2012 in South Korea. In August 2013, the group released their second Japanese-language studio album Treasure Box, which peaked at number four on the Oricon chart and spawned two Oricon top five singles: "Sexy Love" and "Bunny Style!".

T-ara's fifth Korean EP Again was released in October 2013. The EP reached number two on the Gaon Album Chart and yielded a South Korean top-five single titled "Number Nine". The group has released four further EPs, And & End (2014), So Good (2015), Remember (2016), and What's My Name (2017), all of which managed to reach the top five in South Korea. And & End included the single "Sugar Free", which is the group's highest-charting song on the Billboard World Digital Song Sales, peaking at number four. In 2021, the group reunited to release their second single album, Re:T-ara, which peaked at number six on the Gaon Album Chart.

== Albums ==
=== Studio albums ===
List of studio albums, with selected details, chart positions, sales, and certifications
Title	Details	Peak chart positions		Sales	Certifications
Title	Details	KOR (Note: The Gaon Music Chart was launched in 2010 by the Korea Music Content Industry Association and therefore chart data prior to January 2010 are unavailable.)	JPN	Sales	Certifications
Absolute First Album	Released: November 27, 2009; Label: Core Contents Media; Format: CD, digital download	2	—		
Jewelry Box	Released: June 6, 2012; Label: EMI Music Japan; Format: CD, digital download	—	2	JPN: 104,478	RIAJ: Gold
Treasure Box	Released: August 7, 2013; Label: Universal Music Japan; Format: CD, digital download	—	4	JPN: 27,695	
Gossip Girls	Released: May 14, 2014; Label: Universal Music Japan; Format: CD, digital download	—	7	JPN: 13,626	
"—" denotes releases that did not chart or were not released in that region.

=== Reissue studio albums ===
List of reissues, with selected details, chart positions and sales
Title	Details	Peak chart positions	Sales
Title	Details	KOR	Sales
Breaking Heart	Released: March 3, 2010; Label: Core Contents Media; Formats: CD, digital download	2	KOR: 45,728

=== Compilation albums ===
List of compilation albums, with selected details, chart positions and sales
Title	Details	Peak chart positions	Sales
Title	Details	JPN	Sales
T-ara's Best of Best 2009-2012: Korean ver.	Released: October 10, 2012; Label: EMI Music Japan; Format: CD, DVD, digital download	14	JPN: 17,924
T-ara Single Complete Best Album "Queen of Pops"	Released: July 22, 2014; Label: Universal Music Japan; Format: CD, digital download	33	JPN: 3,559

=== Remix albums ===
List of remix albums, with selected details, chart positions and sales
Title	Details	Peak chart positions	Sales
Title	Details	KOR	Sales
T-ara's Free Time in Paris and Swiss	Released: October 15, 2012; Label: Core Contents Media; Format: CD, digital download	3	KOR: 15,270; JPN: 771
EDM Club Sugar Free Edition	Released: September 24, 2014; Label: Core Contents Media; Format: CD, Digital download	3	KOR: 9,434

== Extended plays ==
List of extended plays, with selected details, chart positions and sales
Title	Details	Peak chart positions			Sales
Title	Details	KOR	JPN	US World	Sales
Temptastic	Released: December 1, 2010; Label: Core Contents Media; Formats: CD, digital download	2	—	—	KOR: 36,623; JPN: 3,516
John Travolta Wannabe	Released: June 23, 2011; Label: Core Contents Media; Formats: CD, digital download	3	—	—	KOR: 34,180; JPN: 5,468
Black Eyes	Released: November 11, 2011; Label: Core Contents Media; Formats: CD, digital download	2	—	—	KOR: 52,065; JPN: 5,506
Day by Day	Released: July 3, 2012; Label: Core Contents Media; Formats: CD, digital download	5	28	—	KOR: 40,928; JPN: 8,458
Again	Released: October 10, 2013; Label: Core Contents Media; Formats: CD, digital download	2	45	—	KOR: 24,652; JPN: 6,459
And & End	Released: September 11, 2014; Label: Core Contents Media; Formats: CD, digital download	2	—	12	KOR: 20,677; JPN: 2,416
So Good	Released: August 4, 2015; Label: MBK Entertainment; Formats: CD, digital download	4	—	—	KOR: 20,695; JPN: 1,250
Remember	Released: November 9, 2016; Label: MBK Entertainment; Formats: CD, digital download	4	—	—	KOR: 17,977
What's My Name?	Released: June 14, 2017; Label: MBK Entertainment; Formats: CD, digital download	4	—	—	KOR: 38,192; JPN: 522
"—" denotes releases that did not chart or were not released in that region.

=== Reissue extended plays ===
List of reissue extended plays, with selected details, chart positions and sales
Title	Details	Peak chart positions		Sales
Title	Details	KOR	JPN	Sales
Roly-Poly in Copacabana	Released: August 22, 2011; Label: Core Contents Media; Formats: CD, digital download	3	—	KOR: 31,816; JPN: 5,303
Funky Town	Released: January 3, 2012; Label: Core Contents Media; Formats: CD, digital download	1	31	KOR: 77,688; JPN: 24,080
Mirage	Released: September 4, 2012; Label: Core Contents Media; Formats: CD, digital download	2	—	KOR: 33,983; JPN: 7,241
Again 1977	Released: December 4, 2013; Label: Core Contents Media; Formats: CD, digital download	2	—	KOR: 16,251
White Winter	Released: December 14, 2013; Label: Core Contents Media; Formats: Digital download	—	—	

== Single albums ==
List of single albums, with selected details, chart positions and sales
Title	Details	Peak chart positions	Sales
Title	Details	KOR	Sales
Little Apple	Released: December 24, 2014; Label: MBK Entertainment; Formats: CD, DVD, digital download	4	KOR: 5,849
Re:T-ara	Released: November 15, 2021; Label: Dingo Music; Formats: CD, digital download	6	KOR: 53,956

== Singles ==
=== Korean singles ===
List of Korean singles, with selected chart positions and sales, showing year released and album name
Title	Year	Peak chart positions			Sales (Note: South Korean sales figures are for digital sales)	Album
Title	Year	KOR	KOR Hot (Note: The Korea K-Pop Hot 100 was launched in 2011 by Billboard and was discontinued in 2014. The chart was later brought back in 2017.)	US World	Sales	Album
"Lies" (거짓말)	2009	—	—	—		Absolute First Album
"TTL (Time to Love)" (with Supernova)	2009	168	—	—		Absolute First Album
"Bo Peep Bo Peep"	2009	4	—	—	KOR: 1,609,000	Absolute First Album
"Like the First Time" (처음처럼)	2009	10	—	—	KOR: 1,854,000	Absolute First Album
"You Drive Me Crazy" (너 때문에 미쳐) (Note: The original Hangul title of the song is "너 때문에 미쳐", which is credited in English as either "You Drive Me Crazy" or "I Go Crazy Because of You".)	2010	1	—	—	KOR: 3,042,000	Breaking Heart
"Why Are You Being Like This?" (왜 이러니) (Note: The original Hangul title of the song is "왜 이러니", which is credited in English as either "What's Wrong?" or "Why Do You Act like That?".)	2010	4	—	—	KOR: 1,728,000 (Note: Cumulative sales figures for "What's Wrong" in 2010 and 2011)	Temptastic
"Yayaya"	2010	5	—	—	KOR: 630,000	Temptastic
"Roly-Poly"	2011	2	1	—	KOR: 4,080,000	John Travolta Wannabe
"Cry Cry"	2011	1	1	8	KOR: 3,756,000 (Note: Cumulative sales figures for "Cry Cry" in 2011 and 2012)	Black Eyes
"We Were in Love" (우리 사랑했잖아) (with Davichi)	2011	1	2	—	KOR: 2,688,000 (Note: Cumulative sales figures for "We Were in Love" in 2011 and 2012)	Funky Town
"Lovey-Dovey"	2012	1	1	9	KOR: 3,760,000	Funky Town
"Day by Day"	2012	2	2	—	KOR: 2,150,000	Day by Day
"Sexy Love"	2012	4	3	7	KOR: 1,540,000	Mirage
"Number Nine" (넘버나인)	2013	5	4	7	KOR: 565,000	Again
"Do You Know Me?" (나 어떡해)	2013	19	15	—	KOR: 177,000	Again 1977
"Sugar Free"	2014	36	—	4	KOR: 122,000	And & End
"So Crazy" (완전 미쳤네)	2015	33	—	—	KOR: 117,000	So Good
"Tiamo"	2016	81	—	—		Remember
"What's My Name?" (내 이름은)	2017	79	—	—		What's My Name?
"Tiki Taka"	2021	132	—	—		Re:T-ara
"—" denotes releases that did not chart or were not released in that region.

=== Japanese singles ===
List of Japanese singles, with selected chart positions and certifications, showing year released and album name
Title	Year	Peak chart positions			Certifications	Album
Title	Year	JPN	JPN Hot	JPN RIAJ (Note: RIAJ chart shut down in 2016)	Certifications	Album
"Bo Peep Bo Peep"	2011	1	1	3	RIAJ: Gold (phy.); Gold (rt.); Gold (dig.)	Jewelry Box
"Yayaya"	2011	7	6	33		Jewelry Box
"Roly-Poly"	2012	3	5	15		Jewelry Box
"Lovey-Dovey"	2012	9	11	19		Jewelry Box
"Sexy Love"	2012	4	5	—		Treasure Box
"Bunny Style!" (バニスタ!)	2013	2	3	—		Treasure Box
"Target"	2013	12	27	—		Treasure Box
"Number Nine / Memories: You Gave Me Guidance" (Note: Number Nine / 記憶~君がくれた道標~)	2013	13	62	—		Gossip Girls
"Lead the Way / La'boon"	2014	8	46	—		Gossip Girls
"—" denotes releases that did not chart or were not released in that region.

=== Promotional singles ===
List of promotional singles, with selected chart positions and sales, showing year released and album name
Title	Year	Peak chart positions		Sales	Album
Title	Year	KOR	KOR Hot	Sales	Album
"TTL Listen 2" (with Supernova)	2009	—	—		Absolute First Album
"Women's Generation" (여성시대) (with SeeYa and Davichi)	2009	—	—		Non-album singles
"Wonder Woman" (원더우먼) (with SeeYa and Davichi)	2010	6	—	KOR: 2,302,000	Non-album singles
"We Are the One"	2010	60	—		Non-album singles
"Skyground Starground" (하늘땅 별땅)	2010	24	—		Non-album singles
"Beautiful Girl"	2011	23	—	KOR: 113,500	Non-album singles
"Log-In"	2011	23	28	KOR: 683,200	Non-album singles
"Bingle Bingle" (빙글빙글) (Note: The original Hangul title of the song is "빙글빙글", which is also credited as "Round and Round".)	2012	18	10	KOR: 450,500	Non-album singles
"Painkiller" (진통제) (with The SeeYa, Speed and 5dolls)	2013	11	13	KOR: 259,100	Non-album singles
"Bikini" (비키니) (with Davichi featuring Skull)	2013	20	11	KOR: 168,800	Non-album singles
"Because I Know" (느낌 아니까)	2013	41	21	KOR: 110,499	Again
"First Love" (feat. Choi Eunbin from Produce 101)	2014	39	22	KOR: 111,700	Cho Young Soo All Star – T-ara
"Little Apple" (with Chopstick Brothers)	2014	91	—	KOR: 21,500	Little Apple
"—" denotes releases that did not chart or were not released in that region.

== Other charted songs ==
List of other charted songs, with selected chart positions and sales, showing year released and album name
Title	Year	Peak chart positions			Sales	Album
Title	Year	KOR	KOR Hot	JPN Hot	Sales	Album
"Apple Is A"	2009	71	—	—		Absolute First Album
"I'm in Pain" (내가 너무 아파) (Note: The original Hangul title of the song is "내가 너무 아파", which is credited in English as "I'm in Pain" or "I'm Really Hurt".)	2010	31	—	—	KOR: 1,220,000	Breaking Heart
"Ma Boo"	2010	94	—	—		Temptastic
"I Love You So Much" (진짜 진짜 좋아해)	2011	54	—	—	KOR: 268,700	John Travolta Wannabe
"Roly-Poly in Copacabana" (Roly-Poly in 코파카바나)	2011	45	73	—		Roly-Poly in Copacabana
"Goodbye, OK"	2011	47	52	—	KOR: 271,500	Black Eyes
"I'm So Bad"	2011	69	87	—	KOR: 190,700	Black Eyes
"O My God"	2011	122	—	—		Black Eyes
"Cry Cry" (Ballad version)	2011	128	83	—	KOR: 90,900	Black Eyes
"Love Me" (あなたのせいで狂いそう) ("You Drive Me Crazy" Japanese ver.)	2011	—	—	—		Jewelry Box
"Holiday"	2012	39	23	—	KOR: 168,200	Day by Day
"Don't Leave" (떠나지마)	2012	43	22	—	KOR: 253,000	Day by Day
"Love Game" (사랑놀이)	2012	66	64	—	KOR: 99,300	Day by Day
"Hue"	2012	98	99	—	KOR: 71,500	Day by Day
"Love All" (낮과 밤) (with Shannon and Gavy NJ)	2012	28	19	—		Mirage
"Day by Day" (Japanese ver.)	2013	—	—	16		Treasure Box
"Hurt" (아파)	2013	124	—	—	KOR: 23,500	Again
"Don't Get Married" (결혼 하지마)	2013	150	—	—		Again
"Hide & Seek" (숨바꼭질)	2013	37	43	—		White Winter
"All Kill"	2021	124	—	—		Re:T-ara
"—" denotes releases that did not chart or were not released in that region.
