= T-ara videography =

T-ara filmography
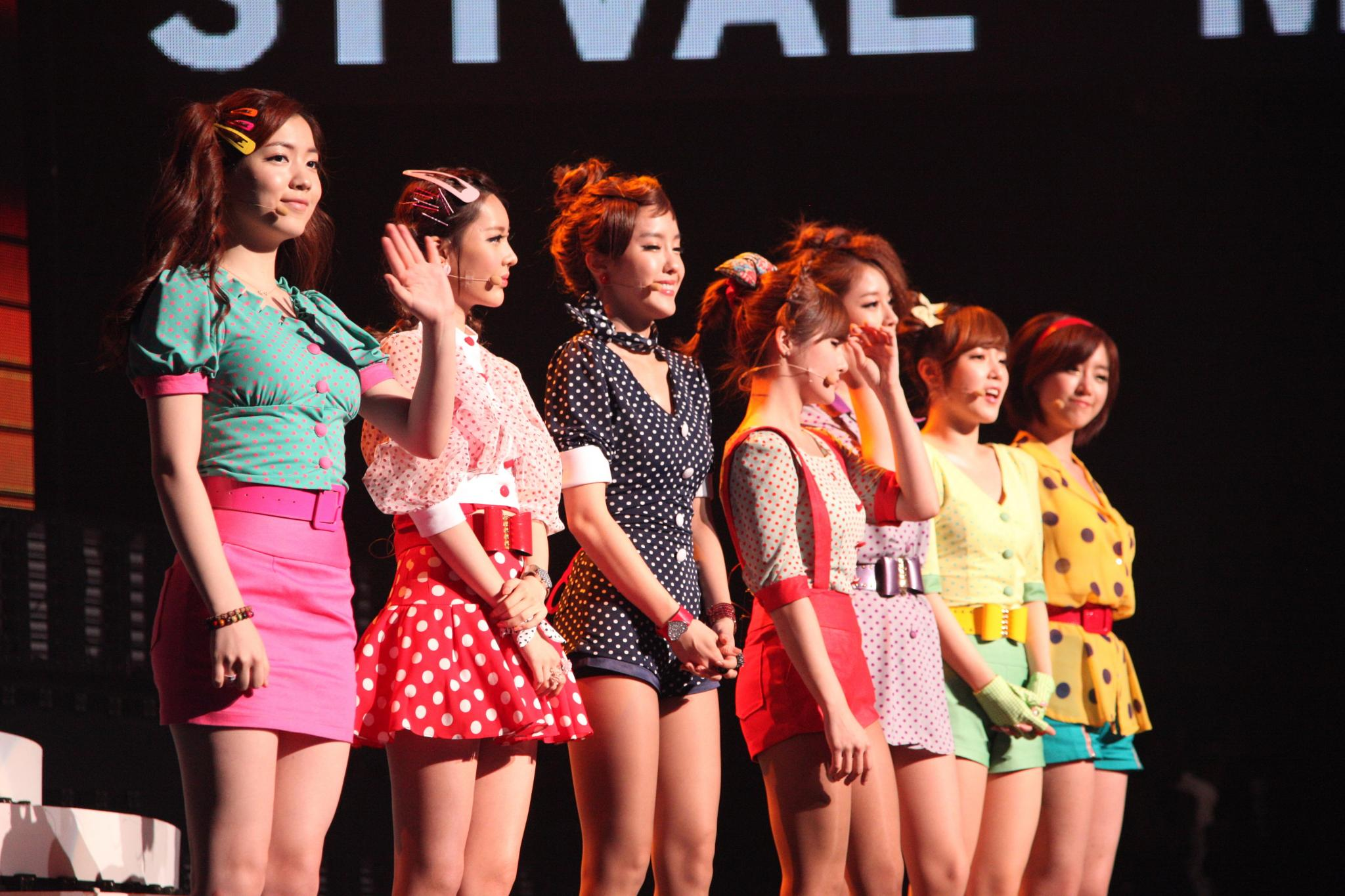
- T-ara at Cyworld Dream Music Festival
- Film: 1
- Television series: 3
- Television shows: 12
- Web shows: 2
- Music Videos: 71
- Commercial music videos: 4
- Original Soundtracks: 3
- Web series: 1
- Advertising: 12

South Korean girl group T-ara debuted in 2009 with the single "Lies". In 2010, T-ara became the main cast of Mnet's reality program Hello Baby in its second season. The show earned the group an award at the 2011 Cable TV Broadcasting Awards. "T-ara's Pretty Boys" was sold and aired in Japan on KNTV Japan in 2012.

== Music videos ==
| Year | Title | Album | Artist(s) | Director(s) | Note |
|---|---|---|---|---|---|
| 2009 | "Good Person" | Absolute First Album | T-ara | Unknown | Pre-debut |
| 2009 | "Women's Generation" | Non-album single | SeeYa, Davichi, and T-ara | Unknown | Special project |
| 2009 | "Forever Love" (Remix) | Non-album single | SeeYa, Davichi, and T-ara | Unknown | Special project |
| 2009 | "Lies (Part.1)" | Absolute First Album | T-ara | Unknown | Debut |
| 2009 | "Lies (Part.2)" | Absolute First Album | T-ara | Unknown | Debut |
| 2009 | "Lies (Ballad ver.)" | Absolute First Album | T-ara | Unknown | Debut |
| 2009 | "Lies" (Ghost play Ver.) | Absolute First Album | T-ara | Unknown | Debut |
| 2009 | "TTL (Time to Love)" | Absolute First Album | T-ara and Supernova | | Special project |
| 2009 | "TTL Listen 2" | Absolute First Album | T-ara and Supernova | | Special project |
| 2009 | "Bo Peep Bo Peep" | Absolute First Album | T-ara | Cha Eun-taek | |
| 2009 | "Bo Peep Bo Peep" (Dance Ver.) | Absolute First Album | T-ara | Cha Eun-taek | |
| 2009 | "Like The First Time" | Absolute First Album | T-ara | Cho Soo-hyun | |
| 2010 | "Wonder Woman" | Non-album single | SeeYa, Davichi, and T-ara | Unknown | Special project |
| 2010 | "You Drive Me Crazy" | Breaking Heart (Note: Repackage / re-released album) | T-ara | Cha Eun-taek | |
| 2010 | "I'm Really Hurt Ver. 1" | Breaking Heart | T-ara | Unknown | |
| 2010 | "I'm Really Hurt Ver. 2" | Breaking Heart | T-ara | Unknown | |
| 2010 | "I'm Really Hurt Ver. 3" | Breaking Heart | T-ara | | |
| 2010 | "We Are the One" | Non-album single | T-ara | | 2010 World-Cup special song |
| 2010 | "Wae Ireoni" | Temptastic | T-ara | Lee Dae-jin | |
| 2010 | "Yayaya" | Temptastic | T-ara | Cha Eun-taek | |
| 2011 | "Beautiful Girl" | Non-album single | T-ara (feat. Electroboyz) | Unknown | |
| 2011 | "Roly-Poly" + Alternate part 2 | John Travolta Wannabe | T-ara | Cha Eun-taek | |
| 2011 | "Roly Poly" (Dance Ver.) | John Travolta Wannabe | T-ara | Cha Eun-taek | |
| 2011 | "Roly Poly" (fan appreciation) | John Travolta Wannabe | T-ara | Cha Eun-taek | |
| 2011 | "Roly-Poly in Copacabana" | Roly-Poly in Copacabana | T-ara | Cha Eun-taek | |
| 2011 | "Bo Peep Bo Peep" (Japanese ver.) | Jewelry Box | T-ara | Cha Eun-taek | Japan debut |
| 2011 | "Cry Cry" | Black Eyes | T-ara | Cha Eun-taek | |
| 2011 | "Cry Cry" (Dance Ver.) | Black Eyes | T-ara | Cha Eun-taek | |
| 2011 | "Cry Cry" (Ballad ver.) | Black Eyes | T-ara | CHANG | |
| 2011 | "Yayaya" (Japanese ver.) | Jewelry Box | T-ara | Cha Eun-taek | |
| 2011 | "Yayaya" (Japanese ver.) (Dance edit) | Jewelry Box | T-ara | Cha Eun-taek | |
| 2011 | "We were in love" | Funky Town | Davichi and T-ara | CHANG | |
| 2012 | "Lovey-Dovey" | Funky Town | T-ara | Cha Eun-taek | |
| 2012 | "Lovey Dovey" (Zombie Ver.) | Funky Town | T-ara | Cha Eun-taek | |
| 2012 | "Lovey Dovey (Tokyo Ver.) | Funky Town | T-ara | Cha Eun-taek | |
| 2012 | "Roly-Poly" (Japanese ver.) | Jewelry Box | T-ara | CHANG | |
| 2012 | "Roly-Poly" (Japanese ver.); Dance edit | Jewelry Box | T-ara | CHANG | |
| 2012 | "Lies" (Japanese ver.) | Jewelry Box | T-ara | CHANG | |
| 2012 | "Lovey-Dovey" (Japanese ver.) | Jewelry Box | T-ara | Unknown | |
| 2012 | "Round & Round" (Note: also on 연가 2012 : 티아라가 엄선한 33곡의 추억여행) | Non-album single | T-ara | Unknown | |
| 2012 | "Round & Round" (Ver.2) | Non-album single | T-ara | | |
| 2012 | "Day by Day" | Day by Day | T-ara | Cha Eun-taek | |
| 2012 | "Day By Day" (Dance Ver.) | Day by Day | T-ara | Cha Eun-taek | |
| 2012 | "Sexy Love" | Mirage | T-ara | Cha Eun-taek | |
| 2012 | "Sexy Love" (Dance Ver.) | Mirage | T-ara | Cha Eun-taek | |
| 2012 | "Sexy Love" (In Tokyo) | Mirage | T-ara | Cha Eun-taek | |
| 2012 | "Sexy Love" (Robot dance) | Mirage | T-ara | Cha Eun-taek | |
| 2012 | "Day and Night" | Mirage | T-ara ft. Shannon &Gavy NJ | Cha Eun-taek | |
| 2012 | "Day by Day" (Japanese ver.) | Treasure Box | T-ara | Cha Eun-taek | |
| 2012 | "Sexy Love" (Japanese ver.) | Treasure Box | T-ara | Cha Eun-taek | |
| 2012 | "Sexy Love" (Japanese ver.) dance Ver. | Treasure Box | T-ara | Cha Eun-taek | |
| 2013 | "Bunny Style!" | Treasure Box | T-ara | Cho Soo-hyun | |
| 2013 | "Bunny Style!" (White Dance) | Treasure Box | T-ara | Cho Soo-hyun | |
| 2013 | "Bunny Style!" (Pink Dance) | Treasure Box | T-ara | Cho Soo-hyun | |
| 2013 | "Target" | Treasure Box | T-ara | Muto Kenji | |
| 2013 | "Number 9" | Again | T-ara | Hong Won-ki | |
| 2013 | "Number 9" (Ver. 2) | Again | T-ara | Hong Won-ki | |
| 2013 | "Because I Know" | Again | T-ara | Hong Won-ki | |
| 2013 | "Do You Know Me" | Again 1977 | T-ara | Hong Won-ki | |
| 2013 | "Hide and Seek" | White Winter | T-ara | Hong Won-ki | |
| 2014 | "First Love" | Non-album single | T-ara feat. EB | Unknown | |
| 2014 | "Number 9" (Japanese ver.) | Gossip Girls | T-ara | Hong Won-ki | |
| 2014 | "Lead the Way" | Gossip Girls | T-ara | Lee Joong-won | |
| 2014 | "Lucky Wannabee" | Gossip Girls | T-ara | Unknown | |
| 2014 | "Sugar Free" | And & End | T-ara | Hong Won-ki | |
| 2014 | "Sugar Free" (Ver. 2) | And & End | T-ara | Hong Won-ki | |
| 2014 | "Sugar Free" (Ver. 3) | And & End | T-ara | Hong Won-ki | |
| 2014 | "Sugar Free" (EDM Club Edition) | And & End | T-ara | Hong Won-ki | |
| 2015 | So Crazy | So Good | T-ara | Hong Won-ki | |
| 2016 | Tiamo | Remember | T-ara | Lee Gi-Baek | |
| 2017 | What's My Name | What's My Name | T-ara | Lee Gi-Baek | |
| 2021 | TIKI-TAKA | Re:T-ARA | T-ara | LayerZ Lee Gi-seok | |
| 2021 | ALL KILL | Re:T-ARA | T-ara | Unknown | Live clip |

== Commercial music videos ==
| Year | Title | Album | Artist(s) | Director(s) | Brand | Ref. |
|---|---|---|---|---|---|---|
| 2009 | "Apple is A" | Absolute First Album | T-ara | PETER VANILLA | Apple Nonghyup | |
| 2010 | "You Drive Me Crazy" (Z9 Ver.) | Breaking Heart | T-ara | Cha Eun-taek | Z9 | |
| 2011 | "Log-In" | Non-album single | T-ara | Unknown | JDX | |
| 2016 | "Cry Cry" (Chinese Ver.) | Non-album single | T-ara | Unknown | World of warships | |

== Original soundtracks ==
| Year | Title | Album | Artist(s) | Drama/Film | Director(s) | Ref. |
|---|---|---|---|---|---|---|
| 2009 | "Good Person" | Absolute First Album | T-ara | Cinderella Man | Unknown | |
| 2009 | "Good Person" (Alternate) | Absolute First Album | T-ara | Cinderella Man | Unknown | |
| 2011 | "Until The End" | Non-album single | T-ara, Seeya | Ghastly | Unknown | |
| 2014 | "Memories ~You Gave Me Guidance~" | Gossip Girls | T-ara | Jinx!!! | Kumazawa Naoto | |

== Video albums ==
| Year | Album details | Notes | Peak chart positions | Sales |
| Year | Album details | Notes | JPN | Sales |
|---|---|---|---|---|
| 2012 | T-ARA.COM DVD-Box 1: Released: February 24, 2012; Language: Korean; Labels: Victor Entertainment | Description First box set of T-ara's variety show T-ara Dot Com. Contains episodes one through five, the song "Bo Peep Bo Peep", and the making-of the music video for "You Drive Me Crazy" and bonus footage from T-ara World. | 107 | — |
| 2012 | T-ARA.COM DVD-Box 2: Released: March 3, 2012; Language: Korean; Labels: Victor Entertainment | Description Second box set of T-ara's variety show T-ara Dot Com. Contains episodes six through ten, the song "Bo Peep Bo Peep", and the making-of the music video for "Neo Ttaemune Michyeo" and bonus footage from T-ara World. | 54 | — |
| 2012 | Cry Cry & Lovey-Dovey Music Video Collection: Released: April 25, 2012; Label: EMI Music Japan; Formats: DVD, Blu-ray | Description Contains the music videos for T-ara's singles "Cry Cry", "Lovey-Dovey", and "We Were in Love" from their Black Eyes extended play and its repackage Funky Town. | 17 | 3,940+ |
| 2012 | T-ara's Best of Best 2009-2012: Korean ver.: Released: October 10, 2012; Label: EMI Music Japan; Format: DVD | Description Contains all of T-ara's singles from Absolute First Album (2009) up to Funky Town (2012), including their 2010 FIFA World Cup digital single "We Are the One". | 8 | 15,678+ |
| 2012 | T-ara Japan Tour 2012: Jewelry Box: Released: December 5, 2012; Label: EMI Music Japan; Format: DVD, Blu-ray | Description T-ARA JAPAN TOUR 2012 ～Jewelry box～ LIVE IN BUDOKAN is the second (first live) Japanese DVD released by T-ARA. It features footage from their performance on July 26 at the Nippon Budokan in Tokyo, Japan for their concert T-ARA JAPAN TOUR 2012 ~Jewelry box~ to promote their first Japanese album Jewelry box. The Blu-ray and Limited Edition include a 28-page photobook and an interview with the group. | 9 | 8,126+ |
| 2013 | T-ara no Ikemen Tachi DVD-BOXI: Released: April 26, 2013; Label: Epcot; Format: DVD | Description T-ARA no Ikemen Tachi DVD-BOX I is the third DVD collection released by T-ARA and first from the variety TV program T-ara's Pretty Boys. | — | — |
| 2013 | T-ara no Ikemen Tachi DVD-BOXII: Released: May 31, 2013; Label: Epcot; Format: DVD | Description T-ARA no Ikemen Tachi DVD-BOX II is the fourth DVD collection released by T-ARA and second from the variety TV program T-ara's Pretty Boys. | 248 | — |
| 2013 | T-ara Japan Tour 2013: Treasure Box: Released: December 11, 2013; Label: EMI Music Japan; Format: DVD, Blu-ray | Description T-ARA JAPAN TOUR 2013 ～TREASURE BOX～ LIVE IN BUDOKAN is the third (second live) Japanese DVD released by T-ARA. It features footage from their performance on September 27 at the Nippon Budokan in Tokyo, Japan for their concert T-ARA JAPAN TOUR 2013 ~TREASURE BOX~ to promote their second Japanese album TREASURE BOX. The Blu-ray version include a photobook and a solo Budokan performance on September 26 from Qri, Soyeon and Boram including other bonus feature. The DVD version includes a bonus DVD. | 10 | 6,299+ |
| 2013 | T-ara Free Time in Europe: Released: December 11, 2013; Language: Korean; Label: LOEN Entertainment; Format: DVD | Description T-ARA FREE TIME IN EUROPE is the first Korean DVD released by T-ARA. The first contains all the Korean produced music videos up to the release of "Sexy Love", except for "Roly-Poly in Copacabana". The DVD also features the music videos' and photobooks' making of. It also includes a repackage of their 200-page photobook T-ARA's Freedom Tour In Europe. | N/A | — |
| 2014 | T-ARA Single Complete BEST Music Clips “Queen of Pops”: Released: June 25, 2014; Label: Universal Music; Format: DVD, Blu-ray | Description T-ARA Single Complete BEST Music Clips 「Queen of Pops」 is the eighth Japanese DVD released by T-ARA. It was released in two editions: Limited (with 2 discs) and Regular (with only the disc 1), and in 2 formats: Blu-ray and DVD. The release includes all PVs released up to date, making-ofs and special contents, such as CM collection, comments by the members, etc. | 35 | 8,169+ |
| 2016 | T-ARA Special Fanmeeting 2016～again～: Released: August 3, 2016; Label: Universal Music; Format: DVD | Description T-ARA Special Fanmeeting 2016 ~Again~ is the ninth Japanese DVD released by T-ARA. It was released in three editions: a limited DVD+CD edition and two regular editions, A and B. The limited edition comes with a bonus CD containing eight solo and unit songs originally released on the "Bunny Style!" singles. | 14 | 1,887+ |

== Filmography ==
=== Films ===
| Year | Title | Role | Notes | Ref. |
|---|---|---|---|---|
| 2011 | Ghastly | Girls at the club | Cameo | |
| 2011 | T-ara X'mas Premium Live ~OSAKA~ | Performer | Concert film | |

=== Television series ===
| Year | Title | Role | Notes | Ref. |
|---|---|---|---|---|
| 2009 | High Kick 2 | Cameo | Episode 39 | |
| 2010 | Master of Study | Cameo | | |
| 2010 | Bubi Bubi | Main role | Special advertising show for Mongeul Mongeul | |

=== Web series ===
| Year | Title | Notes | Ref. |
|---|---|---|---|
| 2015 | Sweet Temptation | Each member plays lead role and has her own story | |

=== Television shows ===
| Year | Title | Role | Notes | Ref |
|---|---|---|---|---|
| 2009 / 2010 | Star King | Recurring guest | | |
| 2009 | Sweet Girl | Contestant | Special survival show | |
| 2009 | T-ara's Ghost Play | Main cast | | |
| 2010 | T-ara Dot Com | Main cast | | |
| 2010 | T-ara's Hello Baby | Main cast | | |
| 2010 | T-ara Dream Girls | Main cast | | |
| 2011 | T-ara's Pretty Boys | Main cast | | |
| 2012 | T-ara Star Life Theater | Main cast | | |
| 2012 | T-ara's Confession | Main cast | | |
| 2013 | Daily T-ara | Main cast | | |
| 2013 | Princess T-ara | Main cast | | |
| 2017 | SNL 9 | Host | | |

=== Web shows ===
| Year | Title | Role | Notes | Ref. |
|---|---|---|---|---|
| 2011 | T-ara & Gankiz Europe travel sketch | Main cast | 6 parts show / YouTube | |
| 2021 | T-Ara Entertainment Inc. | Main cast | YouTube | |

== Advertising ==
| Year | Brand | Notes |
|---|---|---|
| 2009 | Apple Nonghyup | Later released on Absolute First Album |
| 2010 | Gusto | In Japan |
| 2010 | Tedin Waterpark | |
| 2010 | NHN's Z9 Star | |
| 2010 | KTF EVER Mobile Bubi Bubi | |
| 2010 | KTF EVER mobile phone Mongeul Mongeul | |
| 2011 | Look Optical | |
| 2011 | Tedin Waterpark | |
| 2011 | JDX | |
| 2011 | Hi-Mart | First girl group to sign with the mall |
| 2012 | Brillinat Chicken | |
| 2012 | Wild Roses | |

== See also ==
- T-ara discography
- List of awards and nominations received by T-ara
