= Bunny Style! =

- Limited edition A cover

Single by T-ara

from the album Treasure Box
- Language: Japanese
- Released: March 20, 2013
- Recorded: 2013
- Genre: J-Pop, dance
- Label: EMI Music Japan
- Producer: Kwon Si Bong

T-ara Japanese singles chronology
"Sexy Love" (2012)	"Bunny Style!" (2013)	"Target" (2013)

"Bunny Style!" (バニスタ!, Banisuta) is a song by South Korean girl group T-ara. The single was released on March 20, 2013 as their last release under EMI Music Japan. "Bunny Style!" debuted at number 2 on Oricon and at number 3 on Billboard Japan Hot 100 singles. It is T-ara's second highest selling Japanese single in the country with nearly 70,000 copies sold in 2013 alone.

== Background and promotion ==
T-ara held special showcases in fifteen Japanese cities, starting in Sapporo on February 20 and Marioka on 21st. Other cities where they held showcases include Saitama, Kyoto, Fukuoka, Nagasaki etc. The showcase tour reportedly attracted 100,000 local fans. Despite being sung by the K-Pop singers, the original cover is Japanese.

== Reception ==
=== Commercial performance ===
"Bunny Style" debuted at No.2 on Oricon's daily chart, behind HKT48's Suki! Suki! Skip!, selling over 40,000 copies, becoming T-ara's highest first day sales in the country. It also debuted at No.2 on the weekly chart, selling nearly 57,000 copies and accumulated nearly 70,000 sales in the country by the end of the year, becoming T-ara's second best selling Japanese singe to date. The single also debuted at No.3 on Billboard Japan Hot 100 singles and charted at No.82 on the yearly chart.

=== Critical reception ===
Billboard K-Town columnist Jeff Benjamin wrote that the song "incorporates a cuddly and cute theme over a techno club beat" with "aggressive synthesizers that recall Britney Spears' "3". He was critical, however, in saying that while "Banisuta!" brings T-ara's usual earworm hook, the song "fails to be nearly as catchy as singles like "Roly-Poly" or "Lovey-Dovey".

== Track listing ==
Limited edition A
No.	Title	Lyrics	Music	Length
1.	"Banisuta!"	Inoue Tomonori, MEG. ME	MEG. ME	03:57
2.	"Sign" (Soyeon and Areum)	MEG. ME	Hiroko Konishi	04:56
Total length:				08:53

Limited edition B
No.	Title	Lyrics	Music	Length
2.	"シャボン玉のゆくえ (Soap Bubbles)" (Boram and Qri)	Yamauchi Hikaru	Yamauchi Hikaru	02:59
Total length:				06:56

Limited edition C
No.	Title	Lyrics	Music	Length
2.	"Dangerous Love" (Eunjung, Jiyeon and Hyomin)	MEG. ME	MEG. ME	03:41
Total length:				07:39

All limited editions DVD
No.	Title	Length
1.	"Banisuta!" (Music video)
2.	"Banisuta! Music Video Making" (Making-of)

Standard edition 1
No.	Title	Lyrics	Music	Length
2.	"愛の詩 (Love Poem)" (Soyeon solo)	Ichino Onomiya	Yuya Saito	05:24
Total length:				09:21

Standard edition 2
No.	Title	Lyrics	Music	Length
2.	"Two as One" (Eunjung solo)	Takanori Mizoguchi	Aquarius 24	04:55
Total length:				08:53

Standard edition 3
No.	Title	Lyrics	Music	Length
2.	"Maybe Maybe" (Boram solo)	Fujino Takafumi	Makoto Ikuta	03:26
Total length:				07:24

Standard edition 4
No.	Title	Lyrics	Music	Length
2.	"My Sea" (Jiyeon solo)	Noda Akiko	Justin Moretz, Kotaro Egami	04:46
Total length:				08:43

Standard edition 5
No.	Title	Lyrics	Music	Length
2.	"Do We Do We" (Qri solo)	MEG.ME	MEG.ME	03:31
Total length:				03:31

Standard edition 6
No.	Title	Lyrics	Music	Length
2.	"Love Suggestion" (Hyomin solo)	MEG.ME	Katrina Noorbergen, Alex Geringas, Dimitri Ehrlich, Jan Christoph Scheibe	03:16
Total length:				07:13

Standard edition 7
No.	Title	Length
2.	"Happy Rain" (Areum solo)

== Charts ==
Weekly charts
Track	Chart (2013)	Peak position
"Bunny Style!!!"	Japan (Billboard)	3
"Bunny Style!!!"	Japan (Oricon)	2

Yearly charts
Track	Chart (2013)	Peak position
"Bunny Style!!!"	Japan (Billboard)	82

=== Oricon chart ===
Released	Oricon chart	Peak	Debut sales	Sales total
March 20, 2013	Daily singles chart	2	40,705	69,918+
March 20, 2013	Weekly singles chart	2	56,785	69,918+
March 20, 2013	Monthly singles chart	11	65,736	69,918+

== Showcase Tour ==
=== Overview ===
Bunny Style! Special Showcase Tour (2013)
- Japan tour by T-ara
- "Bunny Style!" showcase Tour promotional poster
- Associated album: "Bunny Style!"
- Start date: February 20, 2013
- End date: March 9, 2013
- No. of shows: 14 in total

T-ara concert chronology
- "Sexy Love" Showcase Tour (2012); Bunny Style! Special Showcase Tour (2013); T-ara Japan Tour 2013: Treasure Box (2013)

The T-ara Bunny Style! Special Showcase Tour (T-ARA バニスタ! スペシャル ショーケース) was a tour in Japan by T-ara held to promote "Bunny Style!". A special Fan Sign event was also run, and a competition was held to see who signed the most autographs, and the winner was tied between Boram, Eunjung, and Jiyeon. The tour had 14 showcases across 14 Japanese cities. Hyomin was not present for the showcase due to her filming Jinx!!! at the time.

=== Tour dates ===
Date	City	Country	Venue	Attendance
February 20, 2013	Sapporo	Japan	Sapporo Factory	100,000
February 21, 2013	Iwate	Japan	Aeon Mall Morioka	100,000
February 22, 2013	Aomori	Japan	Aeon Mall Tsugaru Kashiwa	100,000
February 25, 2013	Tokyo	Japan	Tower Records Shibuya	100,000
February 28, 2013	Saitama	Japan	Aeon Mall LakeTown	100,000
March 1, 2013	Shizuoka	Japan	Aeon Mall Hamamatsu Shitoro	100,000
March 2, 2013	Nagoya	Japan	Oasis 21	100,000
March 3, 2013	Kyoto	Japan	Kyoto Shinpukan	100,000
March 4, 2013	Hyogo	Japan	Nishinomiya Gardens	100,000
March 5, 2013	Kagawa	Japan	Aeon Mall Ayagawa	100,000
March 6, 2013	Ehime	Japan	Aeon Mall Niihama	100,000
March 7, 2013	Chugoku	Japan	Pune Okayama Friendship Garden	100,000
March 8, 2013	Fukuoka	Japan	Aeon Mall Omuta	100,000
March 9, 2013	Nagasaki	Japan	Nagasaki Seagull Square	100,000

== Awards and nominations ==
Award Ceremony	Year	Category	Nominee	Result	Ref
Tower Records Awards	2013	Single Of The Year	"Bunny Style"	Nominated	

== Release history ==
Region	Date	Format	Label
Japan	March 20, 2013	CD single	EMI Music Japan
