= Treasure Box (T-ara album) =

Studio album by T-ara
- Released: August 8, 2013
- Recorded: 2012–13
- Genres: J-pop; dancepop; synthpop
- Language: Japanese
- Label: EMI Records Japan

T-ara chronology
T-ara's Best of Best 2009-2012: Korean ver. (2012)	Treasure Box (2013)	Again (2013)

Singles from Treasure Box
- 1. "Day by Day (Japanese ver.)" Released: September 21, 2012; 2. "Sexy Love" Released: November 14, 2012; 3. "Bunny Style!" Released: March 20, 2013; 4. "Target" Released: July 10, 2013

Treasure Box is the third studio album and second Japanese release by South Korean idol group T-ara. It was released on August 7, 2013, as their first album release under Universal Music Japan sublabel EMI Records Japan in two limited editions and a regular edition. In order to promote the album, the group kicked off their second Japan nationwide concert tour T-ara Japan Tour 2013: Treasure Box on September 4, 2013.

== Release and promotion ==
Treasure Box was released in three editions: Pearl, Sapphire and Diamond. Pearl is the normal edition, while the Sapphire is a first press limited edition, which comes with a DVD and the Diamond is also a first press limited edition which comes with a DVD and a photobook. On August 3, their second Japanese nationwide concert tour T-ara Japan Tour 2013: Treasure Box was announced.

Despite leaving the group before the album's release, and not appearing on the cover, Areum's vocals appear throughout the album. The album's first singles "Sexy Love" and "Bunny Style" had their own showcase tours preparing for the main album tour.

== Track listing ==
Treasure Box track listing
No.	Title	Length
1.	"遊んでみる? (Wanna Play) (Japanese ver.)"	2:54
2.	"Sexy Love (Japanese ver.)"	3:45
3.	"バニスタ! (Bunny Style!)"	3:56
4.	"Deja-Vu"	3:35
5.	"Like The First Time (Japanese Ver.)" (初めてのように)	4:06
6.	"Sign (Soyeon & Areum)"	4:55
7.	"シャボン玉のゆくえ (Soap Bubbles) (Boram & Qri)"	2:57
8.	"Dangerous Love (Eunjung, Hyomin, & Jiyeon)"	3:41
9.	"Day by Day (Japanese ver.)"	3:28
10.	"Beautiful Sniper"	3:37
11.	"Target"	3:44
12.	"Bye Bye (Japanese ver.)"	3:35
13.	"キミは僕の宝物～Happy Birthday to you～"	2:13
Total length:		46:26

T-ara Japan Tour 2013: Treasure Box DVD
No.	Title	Lyrics	Music	Length
1.	"Target"	Meg.Me	KOH
2.	"Apple is A" (Japanese ver.)	Ahn Young-min	Cho Young-soo
3.	"yayaya" (Japanese ver.)	E-Tribe, Takafumi Fujino	E-Tribe
4.	"Day by Day" (Japanese ver.)	Makiko	Cho Young-soo, Kim Tae-hyun
5.	"Ai no Uta" (愛の詩; Love Poem, Soyeon solo stage)	Ono Miyaichi Osamu	Yuya Saito, Miyazaki Ayumi
6.	"Shabondama no Yukue" (シャボン玉のゆくえ, Soap Bubbles, Boram + Qri Unit Stage)	Yamauchi Hikaru	Yamauchi Hikaru, Miyazaki Ayumi
7.	"Dangerous Love" (Hyomin, Jiyeon, Eunjung Unit Stage)	MEG. ME	MEG. ME, Miyazaki Ayumi
8.	"Kaze no You ni" (風のように; Like The Wind, QBS Unit)	Fukuda Satoshi	Fukuda Satoshi, Ikuta Magokoro
9.	"Wae Ireoni" (Japanese ver.) (ウェイロニ) (Why Are You Being Like This?)	Yangpa	Kim Do-hoon, Yangpa
10.	"Bunny Style!" (バニスタ！)	Inoue Tomonori, Meg.Me	Meg.Me, Miyazaki Ayumi
11.	"Sexy Love" (Japanese ver.)	Seiko Fujibayashi	Choi Kyu-sung, Shinsadong Tiger
12.	"Daijobu" (Korean ver.) (大丈夫; I'm Okay)	Choi Kyu-sung	Choi Kyu-sung
13.	"Hajimete no You ni" (Japanese ver.) (初めてのように; Like The First Time)	Hazama Tomoko	"Hitman" Bang
14.	"Cry Cry" (Japanese ver.)	Onomiya Ichino	Kim Tae-hyeon, Cho Young-soo
15.	"Love Suggestion" (Hyomin solo stage)	Meg.Me	Katrina Noorbergen, Alex Geringas, Dimitri Ehrlich, Jan Christoph Scheibe
16.	"My Sea" (Jiyeon solo stage)	Noda Akiko	Kotaro Egami, Miyazaki Ayumi
17.	"Two As One" (Eunjung solo stage)	Mizoguchi Takanori	AQUARIUS 24, Miyazaki Ayumi
18.	"Beautiful Sniper"	Takafumi Fujino	Takafumi Fujino
19.	"Love Me! ～Anata no Sei de Kurisou～" (Japanese ver.) (あなたのせいで狂いそう, "I Go Crazy Because of You")	Onomiya Ichino, Zoop (Rap only)	Cho Young-soo, Kim Tae-hyun
20.	"T.T.L (Time To Love)" (Japanese ver.) (DJ Hanmin Remix ver.)	Hi-D, Kim Do-hoon	Hi-D, Kim Do-hoon
21.	"Lovey-Dovey" (Japanese ver.)	Shoko Fujibayashi	Choi Kyu-sung, Shinsadong Tiger
22.	"Bo Peep Bo Peep" (Japanese ver.) (Encore)	Zoop	Shinsadong Tiger, Choi Kyu-sung
23.	"Roly-Poly" (Japanese ver.) (Encore)	Shoko Fujibayashi	Shinsadong Tiger, Choi Kyu-sung
24.	"Bye Bye" (Japanese ver.) (Encore)	Ono Miyaichi Osamu	Nam Gi-sang

DVD Disc 2 (Bonus Videos)
No.	Title	Length
1.	"Treasure 6 Screen 'Target'" (“Target” 6-Screen Multi-Angle Video)
2.	"Treasure Photo" (Photo slideshow including unreleased photos from debut to present.)
3.	"Treasure Movie" (Digest Video of the September 26th Budokan Performance)
4.	"Treasure Film" (solo stage Collection) (September 26th Budokan performance videos featuring Qri's "Do We Do We", Soyeon's "Sign", and Boram's "Maybe Maybe" solo stage.)
5.	"Treasure VTR"

== Concert tour ==
=== Overview ===
T-ara Japan Tour 2013: Treasure Box
- Tour by T-ara
- Associated album: Treasure Box
- Start date: September 4, 2013
- End date: September 27, 2013
- Legs: 1
- No. of shows: 9

T-ara concert chronology
- T-ara Japan Tour 2012: Jewelry Box (2012); T-ara Japan Tour 2013: Treasure Box (2013); T-ara Great China Tour (2015)

The T-ara Japan Tour 2013: Treasure Box was the group's second Japan nationwide concert tour, held in support of the album. T-ara held a two-day concert prior to the album's release on July 12–13 at the Nippon Budokan, whilst preparing for their upcoming tour. The tour officially began on September 4, 2013, at Fukuoka Sun Palace, Japan and ended on September 27 at the Nippon Budokan in Tokyo, Japan.

=== Setlists ===
Setlist

Act 1

1. "Target"
2. "Apple is A" (Japanese Ver.)
3. "Yayaya" (Japanese Ver.)
4. "Day by Day" (Japanese Ver.)

Act 2

1. "愛の詩 (Love Poem)" (Soyeon's solo)
2. "シャボン玉のゆくえ (Soap Bubbles)" (Qri & Boram)
3. "Dangerous Love" - (Eunjung & Jiyeon & Hyomin)
4. "風のように (Like A Wind)" (QBS)

Act 3

1. "Bunny Style!"
2. "ウェイロニ (Why Are You Being Like This)" (Japanese Ver.)
3. "Sexy Love" (Japanese Ver.)
4. "I'm Okay"
5. "初めてのように (Like the First Time)" (Japanese Ver.)
6. "Cry Cry" (Japanese Ver.)

Act 4

1. "Do We Do We" (Qri's solo)
2. "Two As One" (Eunjung's solo)
3. "Beautiful Sniper"
4. "あなたのせいで狂いそう (I Go Crazy Because of You)" (Japanese Ver.)
5. "T.T.L (Remix Dance Ver.)" (Japanese Ver.)
6. "Lovey-Dovey" (Japanese Ver.)

Encore

1. "Day by Day" (Japanese Ver.)
2. "Roly-Poly" (Japanese Ver.)
3. "Bye Bye" (Japanese Ver.)

=== Tour dates ===
Date	City	Venue	Attendance
July 12, 2013	Tokyo	Nippon Budokan	18,000
July 13, 2013	Tokyo	Nippon Budokan	18,000
September 4, 2013	Fukuoka	Fukuoka Sunpalace	—
September 5, 2013	Fukuoka	Fukuoka Sunpalace	—
September 7, 2013	Kobe	World Memorial Hall	—
September 8, 2013	Kobe	World Memorial Hall	—
September 10, 2013	Sapporo	Nitori Culture Hall	—
September 11, 2013	Sapporo	Nitori Culture Hall	—
September 15, 2013	Nagoya	Nagoya Century Hall	—
September 26, 2013	Tokyo	Nippon Budokan	—
September 27, 2013	Tokyo	Nippon Budokan	—
Total			N/A

== Charts ==
Chart (2013)	Peak position
Japan Weekly Albums (Oricon)	4
Japan Top Albums Sales (Billboard)	4
Japan Monthly Albums (Oricon)	14

== Sales ==
Region	Sales
Japan (Oricon)	27,695
