= Tiki Taka (song) =

2021 song by T-ara

Single by T-ara

from the album Re:T-ara
- Language: Korean
- Released: November 15, 2021
- Recorded: 2021
- Genre: K-pop; dance-pop; electronic
- Length: 3:17
- Label: Dreamus; Dingo Music
- Composers: Colde; Minit; basecamp
- Lyricist: Colde
- Producers: T-ara; Woo Sang Beom

T-ara singles chronology
"What's My Name?" (2017)	"Tiki Taka" (2021)

Music video
- Tiki Taka on YouTube

"Tiki Taka" (Korean: 티키타카) is a single recorded by South Korean girl group T-ara, released on November 15, 2021, by Dingo Music and distributed by Dreamus. It serves as the lead track for the group's second single album, Re:T-ara. It marks their group's first release in four years following What's My Name? (2017). The group revealed that they were the executive co-producers of the single, as they were unable to coordinate their individual schedules with a company and additionally wanted greater involvement in decision-making.

== Background and release ==
On July 29, during their 12th-anniversary broadcast on V Live, T-ara announced that they would be making their first comeback in four years before the winter of 2021. Teaser photos were uploaded on Dingo Music's Instagram page on November 9 and 10, 2021. It was later revealed that the group would collaborate with Dingo Music to release the single album Re:T-ARA on November 15, 2021. At the time, all members except Eunjung were free agents, which made it easier to work on the single.

The song was released on various Korean online music platforms, including Melon and Genie Music on November 15, 2021. For the global market, the album was made available on iTunes.

The group funded the project themselves. Dance crew La Chica, who is known for working with Chung Ha and competing on Street Woman Fighter, was selected to create the choreography for "Tiki Taka". It was later revealed that T-ara members planned the comeback entirely on their own, handling song production and styling without any staff involvement. In an interview with News1, the group shared that although they received multiple offers to produce albums and perform, they ultimately decided to be the executive co-producers of this release. This decision was driven by their inability to coordinate individual schedules with a company and their desire for greater creative control. Qri took charge of styling the members for the photoshoot, deciding on hairstyles and makeup, and even acted as the group's manager, coordinating their individual activities.

== Composition ==
"Tiki Taka" features a strong bass-driven chorus and an addictive melody composed by Colde, who has previously worked with BTS's RM, SHINee, Chung Ha, and EXO's Baekhyun. T-ara revealed that they wanted a fresh sound for "Tiki Taka", which led them to collaborate with Colde for the first time. The lyrics depict a doomed relationship where both parties continuously hurt each other "back and forth," while making a promise not to be deceived again by "clumsy love."

== Music video and promotion ==
On November 12, the first teaser for the "Tiki Taka" music video was released. This was followed by a second teaser on November 14. The official music video premiered on YouTube on November 15. A performance video was later released on November 23, 2021. "Tiki Taka" did not receive a formal promotions on South Korean music shows. However, on November 21, 2021, T-ara performed the song for the first time at their fan meeting, T-ara FAN PARTY – Return of The Queen, held at the Universal Arts Center in Gwangjin-gu, Seoul, South Korea.

== Reception ==
In a review published by British magazine NME, Rhian Daly praised "Tiki Taka" for T-ara's willingness to embrace a new sound rather than relying on their past catalog. The reviewer also highlighted the members' rich, plush vocals and expressive delivery, which enhance the song's emotional lyrics. However, he criticized the ending for lacking a final chorus, stating that it fades into nothing at its climax, making it feel underwhelming. While he commended the song, he felt it didn't stand out as much as the B-side track "All Kill".

"Tiki Taka" was also featured on YesAsia's Editor's Pick list, where the reviewer praised its style and fresh attitude. They also highlighted how T-ara members' voices perfectly complement the song's melancholic melodies. Commercially, the song debuted at number 132 on the Circle Digital Chart.

== Credits ==
- Qri, Eun-jung, Hyo-min, Jiyeon – Executive producer, vocals
- Woo Sang Beom – Executive producer
- Colde – Writing, composing, arrangement, lyrics
- Basecamp – Writing, arrangement, composing
- Johnny of basecamp – Bass
- Minit – Writing, composing, arrangement, drum
- C'SA – Chorus
- MadeBy – Mastering
- Mr. Cho – Mixing
- Kang Dong-ho – Mixing (Assist)
- Milena – Piano

== Charts ==
Chart (2021)	Peak position
South Korea (Gaon)	132

== Release history ==
Country	Date	Album	Distributing label	Format
South Korea	November 15, 2021	Re:T-ara	Dingo Music; Dreamus	Digital download
Worldwide	November 15, 2021	Re:T-ara	Dingo Music; Dreamus	Digital download
