= Jewelry Box (T-ara album) =

2012 album by T-ara

Studio album by T-ara
- Released: June 6, 2012
- Recorded: 2011–2012
- Genres: J-pop; dance-pop; electropop
- Length: 45:43
- Label: EMI Music Japan

T-ara chronology
Black Eyes (2011)	Jewelry Box (2012)	Day by Day (2012)

Singles from Jewelry Box
- 1. "Bo Peep Bo Peep" Released: September 28, 2011; 2. "Yayaya" Released: November 30, 2011; 3. "Roly-Poly" Released: February 29, 2012; 4. "Lovey-Dovey" Released: May 23, 2012

Jewelry Box is the first Japanese and second overall studio album by South Korean girl group T-ara. The album was a commercial success peaking at 2 on the official Oricon weekly albums and earning a Gold certification from RIAJ. To promote the album, a tour was held beginning in July 2012, drawing 40,000 spectators.

== Release and promotion ==
The album was announced on March 6, 2012, with a June release date, with a planned release in June, coinciding with the announcement of the group's live Japanese tour ~T-ara Japan Tour 2012: Jewelry Box~. The album was released in three versions: Diamond, Sapphire, and Pearl.The Diamond edition features special jewelry box-style packaging, the Sapphire edition is packaged in a digipak and the Pearl edition comes in a standard jewel case. The Diamond and Sapphire editions include a 100-page and 32-page photo book, respectively. Each edition also contains one random trading card out of eight possible types.

== Commercial performance ==
Professional ratings
Review scores
Source	Rating
Rolling Stone Japan	3/5 stars

Jewelry Box debuted at number two on the Oricon Albums Chart, with first-week sales of 57,102 in Japan. In its second week, the album dropped to number seven selling 14,276 copies. The album remained in the top twenty during its third and fourth weeks and fell to the top thirty in its fifth week. It ranked at number six on the Oricon Monthly Albums Chart, selling 86,530 copies. After a month of sales, the album was certified Gold by the Recording Industry Association of Japan for shipments exceeding 100,000 copies.

== Singles ==
Four singles have been released prior to the album, with the last released two weeks before the release of Jewelry Box. The group's debut Japanese single, "Bo Peep Bo Peep", was released on September 28, 2011. The music video for the song premiered four weeks prior to the release of the single on September 1, 2011, on the Japanese cable television network Space Shower TV. The single debuted at number one on Oricon's Weekly Singles chart with 49,712 copies sold, setting a record as the first Korean girl group to debut at the top position. The song has also reached number one on the Billboard Japan Hot 100.

"Yayaya" was announced on October 14, 2011, and was released on November 30, 2011. The single debuted at number seven on Oricon's Weekly Singles chart with 31,801 copies sold. It also peaked at number six on the Billboard Japan Hot 100. At the time, the group was actively promoting in both Korea and Japan, promoting their third Korean extended play Black Eyes alongside the promotion of "Yayaya".

"Roly-Poly" was released on February 29, 2012, with the music video premiering a month earlier on January 20. Initially, Japanese fans expressed concerns about the lack of promotional activities for "Roly-Poly", as the Korean version of the song was included as the b-side for their last single, "Yayaya", T-ara's Korean agency Core Contents Media announced that "It isn't definite that we do not plan to have activities for "Roly-Poly" in Japan, we only added in the Korean version as a b-side for now. We have still only in the early stages and have yet to pick out a song that will come after "Yayaya"." However, a promo flyer for T-ara's third single being "Roly-Poly" was uploaded to the internet on December 20, with their official Japanese website confirming the single on the same day. A short music video was also produced for one of the b-sides, the Japanese version of "Lies" titled "コジンマル～嘘～". "Roly-Poly" debuted at number three on Oricon's Weekly Singles chart, selling 41,285 copies, and peaking at number five on the Billboard Japan Hot 100.

"Lovey-Dovey", the fourth and final single for Jewelry Box, was released on May 23, 2012.

== Concert tour ==
T-ara Japan Tour 2012: Jewelry Box
- Tour by T-ara
- Official promotional poster for T-ara Japan Tour 2012: Jewelry Box.
- Associated album: Jewelry Box
- Start date: June 19, 2012
- End date: July 26, 2012
- No. of shows: 11

T-ara concert chronology
- T-ara X'mas Premium Live (2011); T-ara Japan Tour 2012: Jewelry Box (2012); T-ara Japan Tour 2013: Treasure Box (2013)

=== Overview ===
The T-ara Japan Tour 2012: Jewelry Box (stylized as T-ARA JAPAN TOUR 2012～Jewelry Box～) was the group's first nationwide concert tour in Japan, organized to promote their debut Japanese studio album, Jewelry Box. The tour commenced on June 19, 2012, at the Aichi Prefectural Arts Theater in Nagoya, Japan and concluded on July 26 at the Nippon Budokan in Tokyo, Japan, which was completely sold out. The tour's final concert on July 26 was broadcast by Sky Perfect TV on September 29, 2012. A special edition of the Japanese magazine HallyuPia was released, documenting key moments of the tour. It includes fan reactions to the concerts and provides a detailed report on the events held across Japan. This edition offers an extensive overview of the tour's activities and the surrounding events.

This tour marked T-ara as the first Korean girl group to perform at Nippon Budokan. The show was recorded and later released in DVD and Blu-ray format. It was the group's last performance with Ryu Hwa-young before her contract termination.

=== Setlists ===
Set list in Nagoya and Osaka

Main Set
Act 1

1. "Lovey-Dovey" (Japanese ver.)
2. "T-ARATiC MAGiC MUSiC"
3. "YAYAYA" (Japanese ver.)
4. "Apple is A" (Japanese ver.)

Act 2

1. "コジンマル～嘘～ (Lies)" (Japanese ver.)
2. "私がとても痛くて (I'm Really Hurt)" (Japanese ver.)
3. "ウェイロニ (Why Are You Being Like This)" (Japanese ver.)
4. "会いたかった (I Wanted to Meet You)" (Boram, Qri & Hwayoung)
5. "ORION" (Soyeon's solo)
6. "Freakum Dress" (Jiyeon, Eunjung & Hyomin)

Act 3

1. "あなたのせいで狂いそう (I Go Crazy Because Of You)" (Japanese ver.)
2. "Cry Cry" (Japanese ver.)
3. "Till The World Ends"
4. "初めてのように (Like The First Time)" (Japanese ver.)
5. "Bye Bye" (Japanese ver.)
6. "T.T.L (Time To Love)" (Japanese ver.)
7. "Bo Peep Bo Peep" (Japanese ver.)
8. "Roly-Poly" (Japanese ver.)

Encore

Nagoya

1. "Lovey-Dovey" (Japanese ver.)
2. "Roly-Poly" (Japanese ver.)
3. "Bo Peep Bo Peep" (Japanese ver.)

Osaka

1. "Roly-Poly" (Japanese ver.)
2. "YAYAYA" (Japanese ver.)
3. "Lovey-Dovey" (Japanese ver.)
Set list in Fukuoka, Sendai & Sapporo

Main Set
Act 1

1. "Roly-Poly" (Japanese ver.)
2. "ウェイロニ (Why Are You Being Like This)" (Japanese ver.)
3. "T-ARATiC MAGiC MUSiC"
4. "YAYAYA" (Japanese ver.)

Act 2

1. "コジンマル～嘘～ (Lies)" (Japanese ver.)
2. "Cry Cry" (Japanese ver.)
3. Eunjung, Hyomin & Jiyeon Dance Battle
4. "ORION" (Soyeon's solo)
5. "会いたかった (I Wanted to Meet You)" (Boram, Qri & Hwayoung)

Act 3

1. "あなたのせいで狂いそう (I Go Crazy Because Of You)" (Japanese ver.)
2. "私がとても痛くて (I'm Really Hurt)" (Japanese ver.)
3. "Apple is A" (Japanese ver.)
4. "Bo Peep Bo Peep" (Japanese ver.)
5. "初めてのように (Like The First Time)" (Japanese ver.)
6. "Bye Bye" (Japanese ver.)

Act 4

1. "Till The World Ends"
2. "T.T.L (Time To Love)" (Japanese ver.)
3. "Lovey-Dovey" (Japanese ver.)

Encore

1. "Roly-Poly" (Japanese ver.)
2. "YAYAYA" (Japanese ver.)
3. "Lovey-Dovey" (Japanese ver.)
Set list in Tokyo

Main Set
Act 1

1. "Roly-Poly" (Japanese ver.)
2. "ウェイロニ (Why Are You Being Like This)" (Japanese ver.)
3. "T-ARATiC MAGiC MUSiC"
4. "YAYAYA" (Japanese ver.)

Act 2

1. "コジンマル～嘘～ (Lies)" (Japanese ver.)
2. "Cry Cry" (Japanese ver.)
3. "Price Tage" (Areum's solo)
4. "Choo Choo TRAIN" (Eunjung, Hyomin & Jiyeon)
5. "Cutie Honey" (Soyeon's solo)
6. "会いたかった (I Wanted to Meet You)" (Boram & Qri) (Hwayoung didn't participate in the show due to injury.)

Act 3

1. "あなたのせいで狂いそう (I Go Crazy Because Of You)" (Japanese ver.)
2. "私がとても痛くて (I'm Really Hurt)" (Japanese ver.)
3. "Apple is A" (Japanese ver.)
4. "I'll Be Missing You" (Dani's solo)
5. "Bo Peep Bo Peep" (Japanese ver.)
6. "初めてのように (Like The First Time)" (Japanese ver.)
7. "Bye Bye" (Japanese ver.)

Act 4

1. "Day By Day"
2. "T.T.L (Time To Love)" (Japanese ver.)
3. "Lovey-Dovey" (Japanese ver.)

Encore

1. "Roly-Poly" (Japanese ver.)
2. "YAYAYA" (Japanese ver.)
3. "Lovey-Dovey" (Japanese ver.)

=== Tour dates ===
Date	City	Venue	Attendance
June 19, 2012	Nagoya	Aichi Prefectural Arts Theater	4,000
June 20, 2012	Nagoya	Aichi Prefectural Arts Theater	4,000
June 22, 2012	Osaka	Osaka International Convention Center	8,000
June 23, 2012	Osaka	Osaka International Convention Center	8,000
June 24, 2012	Osaka	Osaka International Convention Center	8,000
June 25, 2012	Fukuoka	Fukuoka Sunpalace	4,000
June 26, 2012	Fukuoka	Fukuoka Sunpalace	4,000
June 28, 2012	Sendai	Zepp Sendai	1,500
June 30, 2012	Sapporo	Zepp Hokkaido	1,500
July 25, 2012	Tokyo	Nippon Budokan	20,000
July 26, 2012	Tokyo	Nippon Budokan	20,000
Total			40,000

== Track listing ==
All editions
No.	Title	Lyrics	Music	Length
1.	"Bo Peep Bo Peep" (Japanese ver.)	Shinsadong Tiger, Choi Kyu-sung, Zoop	Shinsadong Tiger, Choi Kyu-sung	3:47
2.	"Yayaya" (Japanese ver.)	E-Tribe, Takafumi Fujino	E-Tribe	3:29
3.	"Weironi" (Japanese ver.) (ウェイロニ, "Why Are You Being Like This?")	Ikuta Magokoro	Kim Do-hoon, Lee Sang-ho	4:00
4.	"Keep Out"	Onomiya ichino	Park Deok Sang, Crazy Park	3:20
5.	"Apple is A" (Japanese ver.)	Ahn Young-min, Shoko Fujibayashi	Cho Young-soo	3:10
6.	"T.T.L ～Time to Love～" (Japanese ver.)	HI-D	Kim Do-hoon	3:40
7.	"Roly-Poly" (Japanese ver.)	Shinsadong Tiger, Choi Kyu-sung, Shoko Fujibayashi	Shinsadong Tiger, Choi Kyu-sung	3:36
8.	"LOVE ME! ～Anata no Sei de Kurisou～" (Japanese ver.) (あなたのせいで狂いそう, "I Go Crazy Because of You")	Onomiya ichino, Zoop (Rap only)	Cho Young-soo, Kim Tae-hyun	3:17
9.	"Kojinmaru～Uso～" (Japanese ver.) (コジンマル～嘘～, "Geojitmal～Lies～")	Ahn Young-min, Kei	Cho Young-soo	3:49
10.	"Breaking Heart ～Watashi ga Totemo Itakute" (Japanese ver.) (私がとても痛くて, "I'm Very Hurt")	Fujino Takafumi	Shinsadong Tiger, Choi Kyu-sung	3:18
11.	"Cry Cry" (Japanese ver.)	Onomiya ichino	Cho Young-soo, Kim Tae-hyun	3:20
12.	"Lovey-Dovey" (Japanese ver.)	Shinsadong Tiger, Choi Kyu-sung, Shoko Fujibayashi	Shinsadong Tiger, Choi Kyu-sung	3:36
13.	"T-ARATiC MAGiC MUSiC"	Shoko Fujibayashi	Kang Ji-won, Kim Ki-beom	3:28
Total length:				45:43

Diamond edition (Live DVD: T-ara X'mas Premium Live in Osaka 2011 Special Edition)
No.	Title	Length
1.	"Yayaya" (Japanese ver.)
2.	"Kojinmaru～Uso～"
3.	"Weironi"
4.	"Bo Peep Bo Peep" (Japanese ver.)
5.	"Love Me! ～Anata no Sei de Kurisou" (Japanese ver.)
6.	"Watashi ga Totemo Itakute"
7.	"Cry Cry"
8.	"Jiyeon solo dance act"
9.	"TTL (Time to Love)"
10.	"Roly-Poly"
11.	"Bo Peep Bo Peep" (Japanese ver.) (Encore)
12.	"Yayaya" (Japanese ver.) (Encore)
13.	"Roly-Poly" (Japanese ver.) (Encore)
14.	"Bo Peep Bo Peep" (Japanese ver.) (Music video)
15.	"Yayaya" (Japanese ver.) (Music video)
16.	"Roly-Poly" (Japanese ver.) (Music video)
17.	"Lovey-Dovey" (Japanese ver.) (Music video)

Sapphire edition (DVD)
No.	Title	Length
1.	"The First Story of T-ara"

== Charts ==
=== Weekly charts ===
Chart (2012)	Peak position
Japanese Albums (Oricon)	2
Japanese Top Albums (Billboard)	2

=== Year-end charts ===
Chart (2012)	Position
Japanese Albums (Oricon)	65
Japanese Top Albums (Billboard)	53

== Sales and certifications ==
Region	Certification	Certified units/sales
Japan (RIAJ)	Gold	104,478

== Awards and nominations ==
Year	Award ceremony	Category	Result	Ref.
2012	Tower Records Awards	Album of the Year	Nominated	
