= Target (T-ara song) =

- Target Limited edition cover

Single by T-ara

from the album Treasure Box
- Language: Japanese
- Released: July 10, 2013
- Recorded: 2013
- Genre: J-pop, dance
- Label: EMI Japan/Universal Music

T-ara Japanese singles chronology
"Bunny Style!" (2013)	"Target" (2013)	"Number Nine/Kioku: Kimi ga Kureta Michishirube" (2013)

Music video
- "Target" on YouTube

Target is a Japanese song by South Korean girl group T-ara. It was released on July 10, 2013. This is the 7th Japanese single from T-ara and their final from their second Japanese album Treasure Box. Its music-video was marked as the first of it kind, being the first full-length animation by a K-Pop artist. The song is described an electronic dance music with an up-tempo rhythm.

Due to the unstable diplomatic relations between South Korea and Japan at the time, Target didn't receive any formal local or international promotion like its predecessor.

== Background & release ==
The song is the seventh Japanese single from T-ara, written and composed by MEG.ME with arrangement by KOH. The song to be included in their second Japanese album,Treasure Box. The single was released in 3 different versions: a limited CD+DVD edition and two regular CD-only editions with different covers. An MV teaser was released on July 2, 2013. It was later re-released on the group's 2014 Best hits album T-ARA Single Complete Best Album "Queen of Pops".

The single's first jacket visuals and the music video are all inspired by Japanese animation. T-ara members cosplay as "little devils" in the music video. Merchandise included stickers and collectibles based on the animated characters.

An app was later released based on the music video of the song. It allowed users to play with an animated version of each member through mini-games, it also contains unlockable costumes, pictures, and songs.

== Music video ==
A preview for the song's music video was released on July 1, 2013, on Universal Music's channel on YouTube. The full version was released on the same channel on July 10 but similarly to all T-ara's previous Japanese releases, it was only available in Japan.

The music video was marked as the first full-length animation produced by a K-Pop artist. It was produced by Masao Maruyama, who has produced projects such as "TRIGUN", "MONSTER", "Paprika", "NANA", and "Summer Wars". It was marketed using the acrobatic movements of T-ARA dressed as small devils "that cannot be expressed in live action".

== Promotion & live performances ==
Due to the unstable diplomatic relations between South Korea and Japan, Target did not receive a formal promotion and did not have its own showcase tour like the album's previous 2 singles Sexy Love and Bunny Style!. However, it was performed on the group's second Japanese tour which promoted Treasure Box. It was also performed at the pre-game ceremony of "Chiba Lotte Marines VS Tohoku Rakuten Golden Eagles" held at Ksta Miyagi on July 28, 2013. It marked T-ara's first sport-game event in the country. According to Model Press, the performance was well-received by the crowd and had loud cheers. After the performance, T-ara received commemorative gifts from the Rakuten players.

== Commercial performance ==
The single debuted and peaked at number 9 on Oricon's daily chart, becoming the group's 7th consecutive Top 10 hit on the chart. On the weekly chart, it peaked at number 12 selling over 13,000 copies. The single charted for 4 weeks before dropping out of the Top 200. By the end of July, Target scored over 15,000 copies sold in Japan according to Oricon.

== Charts ==
=== Weekly charts ===
Chart (2013)	Peak position
Japan Hot 100 (Billboard)	27
Japan Album Sales (Billboard)	12
Japan weekly singles (Oricon)	12
Japan Adult Contemporary (Billboard)	70

=== Oricon chart ===
Released	Oricon chart	Peak	Debut sales	Sales total
July 10, 2013	Daily singles chart	9	—	15,608
July 10, 2013	Weekly singles chart	12	13,443	15,608
July 10, 2013	Monthly singles chart	42	15,608	15,608
