= Lovey-Dovey (T-ara song) =

- Japanese regular edition

Single by T-ara

from the album Funky Town and Jewelry Box
- Released: January 3, 2012
- Genre: K-pop, electropop, dance-pop
- Length: 3:35
- Label: Core Contents Media, EMI Music Japan
- Songwriters: Shinsadong Tiger, Choi Kyu-sung, Shoko Fujibayashi (JP)
- Producers: Shinsadong Tiger, Choi Kyu-sung

T-ara Korean singles chronology
"We Were in Love" (2011)	"Lovey-Dovey" (2012)	"Day by Day" (2012)

T-ara Japanese singles chronology
"Roly-Poly" (2012)	"Lovey-Dovey" (2012)	"Sexy Love" (2012)

Audio sample
- "Lovey-Dovey": file; help

"Lovey-Dovey" is a song by South Korean girl group T-ara from their fourth extended play Black Eyes (2011) repackage, Funky Town (2012). It was released as the lead single on January 3, 2012. A thirty-second teaser of "Lovey-Dovey" was unveiled at the end of their "Cry Cry" music video, with a full one-minute teaser released on November 30, 2011.

Written and produced by Shinsadong Tiger and Choi Kyu-sung, "Lovey-Dovey" is an electropop song with strong beats, and the instrumental features the use of cowbells and scratching. The song is described as being influenced by the "trendy club music popular in Europe and the United States". The lyrics are about the protagonist feeling lonely without, as well as seeking for, their love interest.

"Lovey-Dovey" reached number one in South Korea as well as number one on the Billboard K-pop Hot 100 chart. Five music videos have been produced for the song, but only three of the five were released. The first version is a continuation of their earlier "Cry Cry" drama music video, the second features a zombie concept, and the third follows the group traveling and promoting around Tokyo, Japan. The song won a total of thirteen number one awards on various South Korean music shows: four on Music Bank, four on Music on Top, three on Inkigayo, and two on M! Countdown.

== Background ==
"Lovey-Dovey" was written and produced by Shinsadong Tiger and Choi Kyu-song. It was revealed on an episode of MBC's K-pop Star Captivating the World that Junhyung of Beast helped suggest song titles and other ideas to Shinsadong Tiger while he was working on the song. In early October 2011, it was reported that T-ara would be promoting "Lovey-Dovey" for their comeback album in November. It was originally decided that the group was to promote both "Cry Cry" and "Lovey-Dovey" at the same time, however, because the two songs had completely different concepts, they made a last minute final decision to promote "Lovey-Dovey" after promotions for "Cry Cry" were over. The choreography for "Lovey Dovey" was created by Yama & Hotchicks dance studio, known for their work on several of T-ara's previous hits, including "Bo Peep Bo Peep", "You're Driving Me Crazy" and "Roly Poly".

The same year, a cover version of the song titled "Lovey-Dovey Plus" was released by Speed as a hommage.

== Music videos ==
T-ara's management agency Core Contents Media announced that a total of three music video directors will be involved in the production of five music videos for "Lovey-Dovey", including "drama"; "dance"; and "club" versions. However, only the "drama" version has been released; with the additional "zombie" and "Tokyo" versions, out of the five. Another version was produced for the Japanese remake of "Lovey-Dovey".

In the "zombie" version, everyone was having a party when a young woman enters the bathroom and puts on her lipstick and then a zombie enters the place and kills her. As more club members get murdered with some women screaming, a security guard tries to keep the zombies out by shutting the hinged bars. But they later break in about to kill T-ara who's in the middle of their performance after the bridge. The scene then transitions into the afterlife where the murdered ones dance with T-ara during the rest. It ends with the two survivors who meet in the mess and he takes her home.

== Reception ==
=== Critical reception ===
Katherine St. Asaph of Popdust included "Lovey-Dovey" on their 'Weekend Playlist' at number seven, describing the song as "... the exact midpoint between today's dance and latter-day disco, with an infectious curtsy of a chorus and vocal burbles." Spin ranked it number 12 in their list of the top 20 K-pop singles of 2012 while Popkultur included it in their list of the 82 best K-pop songs of all time. Northwest Asian Weekly placed it at No. 4 on its The 10 Best Asian Pop Songs in 2012. Named "a certified floor-filler at clubs", NME ranked at first on its list of best T-ARA songs to date in 2024 praising everything from production to choreography and highlighting how the grow managed to truly cement themselves as "The queens of strobe-lit dance floors".

=== Commercial performance ===
In Korea, the song debuted at number one on the Gaon Chart, making it their third consecutive number one—including their collaboration with labelmate Davichi. "Lovey-Dovey" made its debut on the Billboard K-pop Hot 100 at number 20 on the issue dated January 14, 2012, and then climbed to the top of the chart the following week; making it their second consecutive number one. The song spent three weeks at number one on the chart and seven weeks in the top ten. At the end of 2012, "Lovey-Dovey" was downloaded more than 3,700,000 times in South Korea, making it the second most-downloaded song of 2012 on the Circle Digital Charts behind Psy's Gangnam Style and the most downloaded girl group song of 2012. The song was used in the Korean drama Rooftop Prince. "Lovey-Dovey" was also the seventh most-watched Korean music video on YouTube in the first half of 2012.

== Track listing ==
Japanese single:
No.	Title	Lyrics	Music	Length
1.	"Lovey-Dovey" (Japanese ver.)	Shinsadong Tiger, Choi Kyu-sung, Shoko Fujibayashi	Shinsadong Tiger, Choi Kyu-sung

Limited edition DVD:
No.	Title	Length
1.	"Lovey-Dovey (Japanese ver.) Music video"

== Charts ==
=== Weekly charts ===
Chart (2012)	Peak position
Japan (Oricon)	9
Japan (Japan Hot 100)	11
South Korea (Gaon)	1
South Korea (K-pop Hot 100)	1

=== Year-end charts ===
Chart (2012)	Position
South Korea (Gaon)	7

== Sales ==
Country	Sales
South Korea (digital)	3,758,864
Japan (physical)	23,623

== Accolades ==
=== Listicles ===
Publisher	Year	List	Rank	Ref.
Spin	2012	Top 20 K-pop singles of 2012	12th	
Google Korea	2012	Most searched songs in South Korea 2012	4th	
Northwest Asian Weekly	2013	The 10 Best Asian Pop Songs in 2012	4th	
Popkultur	2019	The 82 best K-pop songs of all time	82nd	
YouTube Music	2020	Best Dance Tracks of All Time	Placed	
IZM	2021	Best K-Pop Songs of the 2010s	Placed	
Tidal	2021	Best K-pop songs from the 2010s	Placed	

=== Awards and nominations ===
Awards and nominations
Award ceremony	Year	Category	Result	Ref.
Annual Home Shopping Awards	2012	Top 10 Songs	Won	
Gaon Chart Music Awards	2012	Song of the Month – January	Won	
Golden Disc Awards	2012	Digital Bonsang	Won	
Golden Disc Awards	2012	Digital Daesang	Nominated	
Mnet 20's Choice Awards	2012	20's Online Music	Nominated	
Seoul Music Awards	2013	Main Prize (Bonsang)	Won	

=== Music program awards ===
Program	Date
Mnet's M! Countdown	January 12, 2012
Mnet's M! Countdown	January 19, 2012
SBS's Inkigayo	January 15, 2012
SBS's Inkigayo	January 22, 2012
SBS's Inkigayo	January 29, 2012
JTBC's Music on Top	January 19, 2012
JTBC's Music on Top	January 26, 2012
JTBC's Music on Top	February 2, 2012
JTBC's Music on Top	February 9, 2012
KBS's Music Bank	January 20, 2012
KBS's Music Bank	January 27, 2012
KBS's Music Bank	February 10, 2012
KBS's Music Bank	February 17, 2012

== Release history ==
Region	Date	Format
South Korea	January 3, 2012	Digital download
Japan	May 2, 2012	Digital download
Japan	May 23, 2012	CD single

== See also ==
- List of best-selling singles in South Korea
- List of number-one hits of 2012 (South Korea)
- List of Hot 100 number-one singles of 2012 (Korea)
