= Sexy Love (T-ara song) =

T-ara song

- Japanese version cover

Single by T-ara

from the album Mirage, Treasure Box
- Released: 4 September 2012 (KR); 14 November 2012 (JP)
- Genre: Electronic, dance pop
- Length: 3:45
- Label: Core Contents Media, EMI Music Japan
- Songwriters: Shinsadong Tiger, Choi Kyu-sung, Seiko Fujibayashi (JP)
- Producers: Shinsadong Tiger, Choi Kyu-sung

T-ara singles chronology
"Day by Day" (2012)	"Sexy Love" (2012)	"Number Nine" (2013)

"Sexy Love" (Korean: 섹시러브) is a single by South Korean girl group T-ara and the lead single from their seventh mini-album Mirage. It was released by Core Contents Media on 4 September 2012. This is the first Korean single released by T-ara without Hwayoung after her contract termination. The song was released in Japan and served as the first single from the group's second Japanese album Treasure Box.

== Background and release ==
=== Korean version ===
In mid-July 2012, T-ara's agency Core Contents Media stated that after "Day by Day" promotional schedule was over, a follow-up single arranged by Shinsadong Tiger would be released on 15 August. On an episode of T-ara's "Star Life Theater" broadcast by KBS on 17 July, a picture of T-ara's recording was revealed with former member Hwayoung also participated in the recording. However, due to Hwayoung's removal from the group, it was not until 30 August 2012, that the official album cover and concept photos of the seventh mini-album Mirage were released. The music video trailer for the single "Sexy Love" was also announced on the same day. On September 6, T-ara performed a comeback performance of "Sexy Love" and "Day and Night" on the live music program M Countdown, and officially launched the promotion schedule. The choreography for "Sexy Love" was created by Yama & Hotchicks dance studio, known for their work on several of T-ara's previous hits, including "Bo Peep Bo Peep", "You're Driving Me Crazy" and "Roly Poly".

=== Japanese version ===
On 14 September 2012, T-ara released the Japanese version of "Sexy Love" as their fifth single in the country. All songs were later re-released under the group's second full album Treasure Box. The single was released in three versions: Limited Editions A and B with a DVD, and a regular edition. Each edition included a Japanese remake of a previously released song. Regular editions A & B come with DVDs containing music videos and other content.

== Reception ==
The single peaked in the top five on both the Korean and Japanese charts. The Japanese version peaked at number 4 on Oricon singles chart and charted for a total of 10 weeks. NME included it on its of T-ara's best songs to date. Amanda Yesilbas from Tech magazine Gizmodo, praised the dystopian music video, and noted that it could be referring to society's obsession with sex bots.

== In popular culture ==
"Sexy Love" was featured in the 2024 drama Love In The Big City. Nam Yoon-su and Do Yu who played Go Young and Park Ji-tae respectively practiced the choreography for 4 hours. Additionally, Park Ji-tae is revealed to be a fan and a big supporter of T-ara in the show. In 2026, Girl group Navillera covered the song on multiple occasions, including, at Ara Festival, Sinchon K-pop Show, and Global Artlink Festival.

== ~Sexy Love~ Premium Showcase ==
=== Overview ===
~Sexy Love~ PREMIUM Showcase Tour
- Tour by T-ara
- Location: Japan
- Associated albums: Sexy Love (Japanese Ver.)
- Start date: November 11, 2012
- End date: November 18, 2012
- No. of shows: 6

T-ara concert chronology
- T-ara Japan Tour 2012: Jewelry Box (2012); ~Sexy Love~ PREMIUM Showcase Tour; Bunny Style! Special Showcase Tour (2013)

A special promotional showcase (Mini-Live) tour was held to celebrate the release of Sexy Love (Japanese Ver.). Tour was held across 6 cities in Japan. The purchase of at least one copie of the single was mandatory for access. Additionally, a message card handover event was held after every showcase date, participants were chosen by lottery. The tour kicked off on November 11, 2012 in Fukuoka and ended on November 18, 2012 in Osaka. The Tokyo show held on November 17 reportedly drew a crowd of 3,000 fans.

=== Tour dates ===
Date	City	Country	Venue	Attendance
November 11, 2012	Fukuoka	Japan	Zepp Fukuaka	—
November 11, 2012	Oita City	Japan	Park Place Oita	—
November 16, 2012	Tokyo	Japan	Tokyo Dome City Hall	3,000
November 17, 2012	Kyoto	Japan	Kyoto Theatre	—
November 17, 2012	Nagoya	Japan	Oasis 21	—
November 18, 2012	Osaka	Japan	NHK Osaka Hall	—
Total				—

== Track listing ==
Regular Edition - CD
No.	Title	Lyrics	Music	Length
1.	"Sexy Love (Japanese ver.)"	Shinsadong Tiger, Choi Kyu-Sung, Seiko Fujibayashi	Shinsadong Tiger, Choi Kyu-Sung	03:47
2.	"DAY BY DAY (Japanese ver.)"	Cho Young-Soo, Kim Tae-hyun, Makiko	Cho Young-Soo, Kim Tae-hyun	03:31
3.	"Sexy Love (Japanese ver./Inst.)"			03:47
4.	"DAY BY DAY (Japanese ver./Inst.)"			03:28
Total length:				14:35

Limited Edition A - CD
No.	Title	Lyrics	Music	Length
1.	"Sexy Love (Japanese ver.)"	Shinsadong Tiger, Choi Kyu-Sung, Seiko Fujibayashi	Shinsadong Tiger, Choi Kyu-Sung	03:47
2.	"Bye Bye (Japanese ver.)"	Nam Ki-Sang, Ichino Onomiya	Nam Ki-Sang	03:37
3.	"Sexy Love (Japanese ver./Inst.)"			03:47
4.	"Bye Bye (Japanese ver./Inst.)"			03:34
Total length:				14:47

Limited Edition A - CD
No.	Title	Lyrics	Music	Length
1.	"Sexy Love (Japanese ver.)"	Shinsadong Tiger, Choi Kyu-Sung, Seiko Fujibayashi	Shinsadong Tiger, Choi Kyu-Sung	03:47
2.	"Like the first time (Japanese ver.)"	Hitman' Bang, Makiko	Wonder kid	04:08
3.	"Sexy Love (Japanese ver./Inst.)"			03:47
4.	"Like the first time (Japanese ver./Inst.)"			04:05
Total length:				15:48

Limited Edition A - DVD
No.	Title	Length
1.	"Sexy Love (Japanese ver.) (Music Video)"
2.	"Sexy Love (Music Video Making)"

Limited Edition B - DVD
No.	Title	Length
1.	"DAY BY DAY (Japanese ver.) (Music Video)"
2.	"Sexy Love (Japanese ver.) (Music Video Dance ver.)"

== Charts ==
=== Weekly charts ===
Chart	Peak position
Japan (Oricon)	4
Japan (Japan Hot 100)	5
South Korea (Gaon)	3
South Korea (K-pop Hot 100)	4
US World Digital Songs (Billboard)	7

=== Year-end charts ===
Chart	Position
Japan (Oricon)	165
South Korea (Gaon)	60
South Korea (K-pop Hot 100)	40

== Sales ==
Country	Sales
South Korea (digital)	1,550,000

== Awards and nominations ==
Award ceremony	Year	Category	Result	Ref.
ArcH Music Awards	2012	Top 10 Songs	Won	
GQ Korea Awards	2012	This Year's Will	Won	

== Release history ==
Version	Date	Region	Form	Publisher
Korean version	4 September 2012	Various	Digital download	Core Contents Media
Korean version	4 September 2012	Various	Digital download	Core Contents Media
Japanese version	7 November 2012	Japan	Digital download	EMI Music Japan
Japanese version	14 November 2012	Japan	CD	EMI Music Japan
