= Re:T-ara =

2021 single album by T-ara

Single album by T-ara
- Released: November 15, 2021
- Recorded: 2020–2021
- Genres: K-pop; dance-pop
- Language: Korean
- Labels: Dingo Music; Dreamus
- Producer: Woo Sang Beom

T-ara chronology
What's My Name? (2017)	Re:T-ara (2021)

Singles from Re:T-ara
- 1. "Tiki Taka" Released: November 15, 2021

Music video
- TIKI TAKA on YouTube

Re:T-ara is the second single album by South Korean girl group T-ara. It was released on November 15, 2021 by Dingo Music, and distributed by Dreamus. It marks the group's first release after a four-year hiatus following the EP What's My Name? (2017) and their first independent release. The single consists of two tracks: "All Kill" and the lead single "Tiki Taka". The group credited as producers for the album and reportedly self-funded the project with no backing label.

== Background and release ==
On July 29, it was announced through the group's 12th anniversary V-Live that they would be making their first comeback in four years before the winter of 2021. It was later revealed that the group will collaborate with Dingo Music to make their comeback with the single album Re:T-ara on November 15, 2021.

During an interview with SPOTV, the group agreed that the single took long to release partially because of the members' individual schedules, as they weren't easy to coordinate. They has to divide the company's work, they had no joint label managing them. Hyomin also stated that the group wanted to release something they created entirely on their own.

The single was released on November 15 through Korean online music services, including Melon. For the global market, the album was made available on iTunes. It was also released in physical format.

== Composition ==
The single consists of two tracks: "All Kill" and "Tiki Taka". "All Kill" is a lyrical Western-style hip-hop pop dance track. It was produced by Jo Young-soo and Ahn Young-min, who have collaborate with T-ara since their debut song "Lies". Jiyeon stated that the song represents T-ara's unique sound and that the group came up with its concepts upon hearing for the first time. "Tiki Taka" is also a dance track with a strong bass chorus produced by Colde.

Eunjung explained that the single is a reminiscent of T-ara's traditional musical style, while it also showcases a new mature image for the group. The name of the single, "Re:Tiara", conveys T-ara's aspirations for a fresh new beginning. Qri stated that the group came up with the name, as they wanted to protect T-ara's name. This comes after MBK Entertainment, the group's former label, registered a trademark for T-ara on December 28, 2017. The members officially filed documentation outlining grounds for rejection of MBK Entertainment's trademark on January 19. On August 8, MBK Entertainment trademarks for T-ara had been denied by the Trademark Act.

== Music video ==
On November 12, a first teaser for the music video of "Tiki Taka" was released. On November 14, the second teaser for the music video was released. On November 15, The official music video of "Tiki Taka" was released.

== Promotion ==
None of the single's tracks were performed on weekly music shows like the rest of T-ara's release. However, the group held a special fan party, titled "Return of The Queen", to celebrate the single's release. The event was held on November 21 at Universal Arts Center in Gwangjin District, Seoul.

== Critical reception ==
Pop Wrapped named "All Kill" one of the 21 best K-pop songs of 2021, while NME included it in its list of T-ara's best releases.

== Track listing ==
Credits adapted from Naver.

Re:T-ara track listing
No.	Title	Lyrics	Music	Arrangement	Length
1.	"All Kill"	Ahn Young-min (Conan from Rocoberry)	Cho Young-soo; Lee Yoo-jin	Cho Young-soo; Lee Yoo-jin	3:04
2.	"Tiki Taka" (티키타카)	Colde	Colde; basecamp; Minit	Colde; basecamp; Minit	3:16
Total length:					6:21

== Charts ==
Chart performance for Re:T-ara
Chart (2021)	Peak position
South Korea Albums (Gaon)	6

Chart performance for "All Kill"
Chart (2021)	Peak position
South Korea (Gaon)	124

Chart performance for "Tiki Taka"
Chart (2021)	Peak position
South Korea (Gaon)	132

== Awards and nominations ==
Year	Award	Category	Work	Result	Ref.
2021	Hallyu Fans' Choice Awards	Best Girl Song – November	"Tiki Tika"	Nominated	

== Release history ==
Release history and formats for Re:T-ara
Region	Date	Format	Label
Various	November 15, 2021	Digital download	Dingo Music; Dreamus
South Korea	November 15, 2021	CD; music download	Dingo Music; Dreamus
