= Absolute First Album =

Studio album by T-ara
- Released: November 27, 2009
- Recorded: 2009
- Genres: K-pop; dance-pop
- Label: Core Contents
- Producer: Kwon Chang-hyun

T-ara chronology
Absolute First Album (2009)	Temptastic (2010)

Singles from Absolute First Album
- 1. "TTL (Time to Love)" Released: September 15, 2009; 2. "TTL Listen 2" Released: October 9, 2009; 3. "Bo Peep Bo Peep" Released: November 27, 2009; 4. "Like the First Time" Released: January 15, 2010

Breaking Heart cover
- Repackage cover (Note: The Taiwanese cover has traditional Chinese text on the top of the cover.)

Singles from Breaking Heart
- 1. "You Drive Me Crazy" Released: February 23, 2010

Absolute First Album is the debut studio album by South Korean girl group T-ara. It was released on November 27, 2009, through Core Contents Media. T-ara sought to showcase "two different charms" through Absolute First Album, one embracing a "trendy" image and the other leaning towards a "classic" aesthetic. The result is a modern dance record with traces of retro influences. Absolute First Album features contributions by Shinsadong Tiger, Cho Young-soo, Choi Kyu-sung (now of Black Eyed Pilseung), Wheesung and "Hitman" Bang.

The album was preceded by the hit singles "TTL (Time to Love)" and "TTL Listen 2", with its lead track, "Bo Peep Bo Peep" and "Like the First Time" becoming commercial successes as well. "Bo Peep Bo Peep" was a breakthrough single for T-ara, further attaining recognition as one of their signature songs. Absolute First Album peaked at number two on the Gaon Chart and has received positive reviews.

The success of Absolute First Album lead to T-ara's newcomer wins at the Golden Disc and Seoul Music Awards. The album was re-released as Breaking Heart on February 23, 2010, spawning the hit single "You Drive Me Crazy" which became T-ara's first number-one single on the newly established Gaon Chart. The reissue was nominated for Disk Bonsang and Popularity Award at the Golden Disc Awards.

== Background ==
T-ara was formed by Core Contents Media CEO Kim Kwang-soo, and prior to commencing their activities as a group, two members bowed out after contributing a song to the Cinderella Man soundtrack, citing creative differences. The label brought in three new members and released their debut single "Lies" (Note: Media sources cite their first single as simply "거짓말", though it is officially appended as "거짓말 (Part 1)" and "거짓말 (Dance Ver.)" in their discography.) on July 27, 2009. The song was composed by Cho Young-soo, who would become a frequent collaborator of the group.

T-ara's debut was made amid an influx of girl groups on the Korean pop music scene. A writer for weekly magazine SisaIN remarked that the old-school trot influence of "Lies" did little to appeal to core consumers of the girl group market; those who found nostalgia in 1990s groups like S.E.S. and Fin.K.L. The group utilized a "girlish and pure" image during its run. T-ara would find wider success with their Supernova collaboration "TTL (Time to Love)", a track influenced by southern hip hop. The single was marketed as a "180-degree transformation" of the group, who took on a "sexier" image compared to their debut.

In October 2009, the group revealed their plans for a mini-album release in the coming months. Expanding into a full-length studio album, Absolute First Album was formally announced days prior to its late November release. Core Contents Media brought on Shinsadong Tiger and "Hitman" Bang to produce songs for the album. The marketing for Absolute First Album revolved around its dual concepts; with T-ara's intent to appeal through "two different charms", the group released the title track "Bo Peep Bo Peep" which was backed by a "charismatic" image, whereas the album's b-side track "Like the First Time" was billed as "colorful yet classic".

Absolute First Album was digitally released on November 27, 2009. A physical release followed on December 4, 2009. Upon the album's release, Core Contents Media conducted an online poll in order to determine the lead single. Nearly 9,000 respondents from Melon, Cyworld, and Soribada, among others, were given the choice between "Bo Peep Bo Peep" and "Like the First Time", the latter of which won the poll by 53 percent. However, management chose "Bo Peep Bo Peep" as the label intended to present a "180-degree transformation" of T-ara's image.

== Promotion ==
The group began performing "Bo Peep Bo Peep" on Korea's televised music programs with the December 4, 2009, broadcast of Music Bank. "Like the First Time" was subsequently promoted in January 2010, yet their appearances quickly ceased as main vocalist So-yeon contracted H1N1, as did promotions for Absolute First Album as a whole.

The group's first fan signing event was planned for was scheduled to be held at Synnara Records in Ilsan La Festa on December 13. However, over 2,000 fans applied for the event, so the location was changed to Young poong Books in Jongno for safety concerns.

== Composition ==
Absolute First Album is primarily a dance-pop and electronic record. Member So-yeon remarked that though "idol music [follows] the latest trend", adult listeners would be "at ease" with songs such as "Like the First Time", "Apple is A" or "You You You", as they have ppong (뽕) (Note: Ppong is defined as "melodies and/or vocalism that sound sentimental and old-fashioned".) melodies that "stimulate emotion". Particularly, "You You You", a pulsating, mid-tempo electropop, takes the concept of all-consuming love as T-ARA's muse for the song. It's described by NME as an emotional, devastating tale of devotion that teeters on the edge of obsession for the subject of their affection.

Its lead single, "Bo Peep Bo Peep", is billed as a "trendy" dance song with a "funky" rhythm; Spin magazine describes it as "robotic". The song is one of several that feature repetitive hooks, including "Tic Tic Toc". The album dips into "retro" territory as evident on "Lies", which is derived from trot, and "Like the First Time", which employs 1980s influences. T-ara sings in falsetto on the latter track, and parts of its electronic production is "reminiscent" of Aphex Twin and Humming Urban Stereo. Furthermore, "Like the First Time" has been compared to "In for the Kill" by English synthpop act La Roux. The music video for "Like the First Time" features the group transforming member Hyo-min into a "sophisticated" version of herself.

"You Drive Me Crazy", (Note: The original Hangul title of the song is "너 때문에 미쳐", which is credited in English as either "You Drive Me Crazy" or "I Go Crazy Because of You".) from the Breaking Heart re-issue, is an "edgy" electropop song which has received comparisons to "If U Seek Amy" by American singer Britney Spears. It has been called a "song without breaks" and is highlighted for the "important key role" that synthesizers play in "creating a hook song". Elsewhere, T-ara explores R&B on "Falling U", southern hip hop on "TTL (Time to Love)", and house music on "TTL Listen 2".

== Singles ==
Absolute First Album collects several T-ara singles prior to its release, though they were not utilized to promote the album directly. "Lies" was released on July 27, 2009, as a maxi single containing four tracks: "Lie (Part 1)" and "Lie (Part 2)", a ballad rendition of "Lies", and "Wanna Play?". The songs were re-titled for inclusion on Absolute First Album, with "Lie (Part 2)" omitted completely. (Note: "거짓말 (Part 1)" and "거짓말 (Ballad Ver.)" re-appear as "거짓말 (Dance Ver.)" and "거짓말 (Slow Ver.)" on the album.) A music video was produced for each song: in "Lie (Part 1)", the members are coupled with actor Yoo Seung-ho; "Lie (Part 2)" features the group performing at a waterpark, also known as the "Summer" version. "Lie (Ballad Ver.)" was used to promote the MBC horror series Soul, which stars member Ji-yeon. Actress Lim Ju-eun reprises her role as Ji-yeon's twin sister in the music video. "Wanna Play?" showcases T-ara's "powerful" dance skills in "intense" black, white and red. "Lies" became the album's first hit.

"TTL (Time to Love)" was released on September 15, 2009; a collaboration with T-ara's labelmates Supernova. The two groups formed a project unit consisting of Eun-jung, So-yeon, Hyo-min, and Ji-yeon with Kwang-su, Ji-hyuk, and Geon-il; the single was Supernova's first release in two years. Qri stars in the "TTL (Time to Love)" music video (with a small role for Boram). The single's success prompted Core Contents Media to produce the sequel entitled "TTL Listen 2" with participation from all members of both groups. Originally set for release on October 13, 2009; "TTL Listen 2" was pushed forward to October 9, 2009, due to the popularity of the original song. The groups performed "TTL Listen 2" for the first time at the annual Dream Concert on October 10, 2009. "TTL Listen 2" was also a commercial success peaking within the top 10.

"Bo Peep Bo Peep" was released with the digital album on November 27, 2009. It was a breakthrough for the group, with its cat dance becoming a craze in the country. The single peaked at number four upon the advent of the Gaon charts in January 2010. "Like the First Time" was released as the album's fourth single on January 15, 2010, and both singles sold more than 1.6 million copies each in 2010 alone. The music video for "Like the First Time" features the group transforming member Hyo-min into a "sophisticated" version of herself.

== Breaking Heart ==
In early February 2010, it was announced that T-ara would be re-releasing their album with two new songs in order to thank their fans for the success of their first album. Entitled Breaking Heart, the reissue centers around a "temptation of the devil" concept. Initial concept photos typo-ed the release as Braking Heart. Breaking Heart was physically released on March 3, 2010, in two editions: a standard, and a first press edition with a 56-page photobook. This edition was limited to 6,000 copies. The album was subsequently released in Taiwan as a CD and DVD package, with pre-orders that include a file folder.

The lead single, "You Drive Me Crazy", was penned by singer-songwriter Wheesung, with music by Cho Young-soo and Kim Tae-hyun. Robbie Daw of Idolator drew comparisons to American singer Britney Spears, commenting: "the "Womanizer" beat, the "If U Seek Amy" melody and the wardrobe that looks like it was stolen from the storage unit housing the "...Baby One More Time" video shoot memorabilia. [...] You know, the line "you empower me, sexy shadow" is simply just not used enough in pop songs these days. So props for that, T-ara." Filming for the music video, directed by Cha Eun-taek, began on February 18, 2010, in a Namyangju, Gyeonggi studio. Member Ji-yeon suffered a knee ligament injury during its production, causing the other members to end their solo shoots with Ji-yeon finishing hers the next morning.

T-ara began promotions for the b-side "I'm in Pain", (Note: The original Hangul title of the song is "내가 너무 아파", which is credited in English as "I'm in Pain" or "I'm Really Hurt".) with the March 11, 2010, broadcast of M! Countdown. It was performed alongside "You Drive Me Crazy", with the music video premiering on March 15, 2010. Two alternate versions of the video were further released. By the end of 2010, both tracks ended-up on the list of the best selling songs of 2010 as million-sellers.

== Critical reception ==
The album has received generally positive reviews. A columnist for Sohu Music marked Absolute First Album as a "clear improvement" over their debut single, yet criticized its lack of identity, opining that though T-ara was able to follow popular trends, they had yet to find a suitable music style. Nevertheless, the reviewer picked "Falling U" as a standout track. In a more negative review, Seo Jung-min of K-pop Archive agreed that their music "can't be considered to have its own grammar", and called the album's sound "mechanical and [simplistic]". Seo further expressed their ambivalence towards girl group hook songs "flooding" the Korean pop music scene in 2009. A writer for Sina Entertainment stated that the album was "full of youthfulness" and "T-ara's color". Similarly, a staff writer for Bugs! remarked that the album "[makes] you feel the charm of T-ara" across its fourteen tracks; singling out the "sweet and refreshing" "Apple is A", and "body shaker" "Tic Tic Toc".

Reviewing the Breaking Heart reissue, a Bugs! staff writer calls the album a "turning point showing the essence of fresh electronic music", in addition to naming the album's slower offerings such as "Good Person" and "Falling U" as high quality songs. Members Qri, Hyo-min, and Eun-jung have named "Like the First Time" as their all-time favorite track. In 2017, Jacques Peterson of SBS PopAsia named "TTL (Time to Love)", "You Drive Me Crazy" and "Like the First Time" as among the group's best singles. Peterson previously opined that Absolute First Album "still stands as one of the best, if not the best, Korean girl group album of the past five years". In 2018, SBS PopAsia listed Absolute First Album as one of 10 "Essential Modern K-pop Albums You Need to Hear". KKBox Hong Kong also included "You Drive Me Crazy" in their list of 10 classic K-pop songs of 2010. In 2024, NME ranked side-track "You You You" at No. 9 on its list of T-ARA's best songs to date describing it as an understated cut from their debut album. "Bo Peep Bo Peep" was ranked at No. 5 on the list, "Like the First Time" at No. 4 and "You Drive Me Crazy" at No. 3. Amazon Music included three tracks from Absolute First Album in its list of the greatest K-Pop hits of the 2000s: "Bo Peep Bo Peep" ranked 7th, side track "Falling U" placed 17th, and "TTL" came in at 35th.

== Accolades ==
Awards and nominations
Year	Award ceremony	Category	Nominee	Result	Ref.
2010	Golden Disc Awards	Album Bonsang	Breaking Heart	Nominated	
2010	Golden Disc Awards	Popularity Award	Breaking Heart	Nominated	

== Commercial performance ==
Aboslute First Album recorded over 25,000 in pre-orders in less than a week, ranking number one on the Hanteo real-time charts for three consecutive days. It peaked at number two on the newly launched Gaon Album Chart in January 2010. Similarly, Breaking Heart peaked at number two on the Gaon Album Chart following its release in March and sold 40,695 copies by the end of 2010, ranking as the 35th best-selling album of the year. In total, it has sold 65,030 copies as of 2012.

The album's title track "Bo Peep Bo Peep" was a breakthrough for the group, with its cat dance becoming a craze in the country. The song topped all major real-time charts in 2009 and peaked at number four on the newly launched Gaon Digital Chart in 2010. Despite being released in 2009, the song was the 82nd best selling single in 2010 with over 1.6 million downloads. "Like the First Time", originally a b-side, debuted at number ten on Gaon. It was also one of the best-selling singles of 2010 nearly 1.9 million downloads. From the Breaking Heart re-issue, "You Drive Me Crazy" peaked at number one on the Gaon Digital Chart, holding its position for two weeks. It sold 3 million downloads by the end of 2010 and ranked at number 16 on the annual chart. The re-issue's b-side track "I'm in Pain" peaked at number 31 on Gaon and was downloaded 1.2 million times by the end of the year.

== In popular culture ==
On January 10, 2009, a parody version of "Bo Peep Bo Peep" was performed on South Korean TV show Family Outing aired on SBS by BigBang's Daesung, Jo Han-seon, Yoon Jong-shin, and Kim Su-ro. Nami Tamaki released a Japanese cover of "TTL (Time to Love)" with Supernova in 2011. In 2010, Japanese transgender TV personality Haruna Ai released a remake of "You Drive Me Crazy" titled "Crazy for You". In July 2022, "You Drive Me Crazy" was played in the hit TV series Extraordinary Attorney Woo.

== Charts ==
Chart (2010)	Album	Peak position
South Korea Weekly Albums (Gaon)	Absolute First Album	2
South Korea Yearly Albums (Gaon)	Absolute First Album	189
South Korea Weekly Albums (Gaon)	Breaking Heart	2
South Korea Yearly Albums (Gaon)	Breaking Heart	35

== Track listing ==
Absolute First Album
No.	Title	Lyrics	Music	Arrangement	Length
1.	"One & One"	Shinsadong Tiger, Choi Kyu-Sung	Shinsadong Tiger, Choi Kyu-Sung	Shinsadong Tiger	2:36
2.	"Like the First Time" (처음처럼, Cheoeum Cheoreom)	"Hitman" Bang	"Hitman" Bang	Wonderkid	4:05
3.	"Bo Peep Bo Peep"	Shinsadong Tiger, Choi Kyu-Sung	Shinsadong Tiger, Choi Kyu-Sung	Shinsadong Tiger, Choi Kyu-Sung	3:45
4.	"Tic Tic Toc"	Ahn Young-min	Ahn Young-min	Davina	3:19
5.	"Bye Bye"	Nam Ki-sang, Kang Jung-myung	Nam Ki-sang	Nam Ki-sang	3:34
6.	"Apple Is A"	Ahn Young-min	Cho Young-soo	Cho Young-soo	3:10
7.	"Falling U"	Han Sang-won	Han Sang-won	Yoon Young-min	3:29
8.	"You You You" (너너너, Neo Neo Neo)	Kim Do-hoon, Kim Ki-bum, Rhymer	Kim Do-hoon, Kim Ki-bum	Kim Do-hoon	3:40
9.	"Lies" (Dance version) (거짓말, Geojitmal)	Ahn Young-min	Cho Young-soo	Cho Young-soo	3:46
10.	"TTL (Time to Love)" (featuring Supernova)	Hwang Sung-jin, Rhymer, Joosuc	Kim Do-hoon	Lee Sang-ho	3:38
11.	"Lies" (Slow version)	Ahn Young-min	Cho Young-soo	Cho Young-soo	3:58
12.	"TTL Listen.2" (featuring Supernova)	Rhymer, Sangchu	Kim Do-hoon, Rhymer	Kim Ki-wan	3:31
13.	"Good Person" (좋은사람, Joheun Saram)	K-SMITH	Han Sung-ho	Kim Jae-yang	3:32
14.	"Wanna Play?" (놀아볼래?, Norabollae?)	Ahn Young-min	Cho Young-soo, Kim Tae-hyun	Cho Young-soo, Kim Tae-hyun	2:53
Total length:					49:15

Breaking Heart
No.	Title	Lyrics	Music	Arrangement	Length
1.	"You Drive Me Crazy" (너 때문에 미쳐, Neo Ttaemune Michyeo)	Wheesung	Cho Young-soo, Kim Tae-hyun	Cho Young-soo, Kim Tae-hyun
2.	"I'm in Pain" (내가 너무 아파, Naega Neomu Apa)	Shinsadong Tiger, Choi Kyu-sung	Shinsadong Tiger, Choi Kyu-sung	Shinsadong Tiger, Choi Kyu-sung
Total length:					55:50

Breaking Heart – Taiwanese edition bonus DVD
No.	Title	Length
1.	"Bo Peep Bo Peep" (music video)
2.	"You Drive Me Crazy" (music video)

Notes

- "TTL (Time to Love)" is sometimes stylized as "T.T.L (Time to Love)", though the same is not true of "TTL Listen.2".
- The Breaking Heart reissue is sixteen tracks in total; its two new tracks are appended to the beginning of Absolute First Album.

== Sales ==
Sales in South Korea
Release	Sales	Ref.
Breaking Heart (Album)	65,030	
Bo Peep Bo Peep	1,609,000	
You Drive Me Crazy	3,042,000	
Like the First Time	1,854,000	

== Personnel ==
Credits for Absolute First Album adapted from liner notes.

- Lee Jae-hyunk – executive producer
- Kwo Chang-hyun – producer

== Release history ==
Country	Date	Version	Distributing label	Format
South Korea	December 4, 2009	Absolute First Album	Mnet Media	CD
South Korea	March 3, 2010	Breaking Heart	Mnet Media	CD
Taiwan	August 30, 2010	Breaking Heart	Alpha Music	CD / DVD
Philippines	Juin 4, 2010	Breaking Heart	PolyEast Records	CD / DVD
