= Roly-Poly (T-ara song) =

- Japanese regular edition cover

Single by T-ara

from the album John Travolta Wannabe and Jewelry Box
- Released: 29 June 2011; 29 February 2012 (JP)
- Genre: K-pop, disco
- Length: 3:34
- Label: Core Contents; EMI
- Songwriters: Shinsadong Tiger; Choi Kyu-sung; Shoko Fujibayashi (JP)
- Producers: Shinsadong Tiger; Choi Kyu-sung

T-ara Korean singles chronology
"Yayaya" (2010)	"Roly-Poly" (2011)	"Cry Cry" (2011)

Audio sample
- "Roly-Poly": file; help

Music video
- "Roly-Poly" on YouTube "Roly-Poly" (Japanese ver.) on YouTube

"Roly-Poly" is a song by South Korean girl group T-ara. It was taken from their second mini album John Travolta Wannabe which was released on 29 June 2011. The song was written and produced by Shinsadong Tiger and Choi Kyu-sung, who were also behind the group's 2009 song "Bo Peep Bo Peep". "Roly-Poly" won three weekly music program awards on M Countdown and Inkigayo. Only a month after release, the song accumulated over US$2.3 million in digital sales with over $280,000 per day. Despite peaking at number two on the Gaon Digital Chart, it went on to become the best-selling song of 2011 in South Korea with over 4,000,000 digital downloads, the highest figure for a K-pop girl group single on Gaon in the 2010s. The song was re-released in Japanese on 29 February 2012 as the third single from T-ara's first Japanese album, Jewelry Box.

== Background and release ==
"Roly-Poly" was released on 29 June 2011, as the lead single of T-ara's John Travolta Wannabe with 3 different music videos, a short dance version, a long drama version and special version made by CCM that compiled several covers of the song from fans around the world and was titled "Roly Poly Version 3". The music video was revealed to be viewed in over 70 countries. Stereogum ranked the music video of the song No. 12 on its list of 20 Best K-pop videos. "Roly Poly" was released as the second single for Temptastic on December 1, 2010. The choreography was done by Yama & Hotchicks dance studio, who choreographed some of T-ara's previous hits, including "Bo Peep Bo Peep" and "You're Driving Me Crazy" and "Why Are You Being Like This?".

A remix of the song titled "Roly-Poly in Copacabana" was released on 2 August and was used for the group's follow up promotions. The song was re-released in Japanese on 29 February 2012, as the group's third single in the Japanese market. The single peaked at 3 on Oricon and at 5 on Billboard Japan Hot 100.

== Critical reception ==
Since its release, the song has received positive reviews from critics. The song was listed among the best hit songs of the last decade and of all time by multiple local and international publications. Chinese media Sina Music described "Roly-Poly" as the most dazzling retro dance music recently, "and it has the strength to bring the retro style back again".

In 2021, Gabriela Caeli Sumampow of Vice included Roly Poly in her "bubbly K-pop" guide on "The Guide to Getting Into K-Pop, South Korea's Record-Breaking Pop Music". PopMatters gave "Roly-Poly" a positive review; "Its success propelled the start of a disco trend in K-pop, as heard later in songs like Dal Shabet's "Bling Bling" (2011) and Nine Muses's "Figaro" (2011). The magazine also referred to the song as "one of the catchiest K-pop songs ever made". Stereogum ranked the music video of the song No. 12 on its list of 20 Best K-pop videos. The song was selected as the song of the summer by club DJs. In January 2024, the song was placed at No. 12 on Hello Music Theory's list of 15 Of The Best K-Pop Songs Of All Time describing it as a cultural phenomenon. The same year, NME ranked it at No. 2 on its list of the best T-ARA songs to date.

== Commercial performance ==
On the Gaon Digital Chart dated 26 June 2011, "Roly-Poly" debuted at number three, before descending to number eight the week after. On its third week it bounced back to number two, the song's peak on the chart. "Roly-Poly" managed to hold at the runner-up slot for two more weeks (stuck behind three different songs nonetheless), before descending down the chart. Only a month after release, the song accumulated over US$2.3 million in digital sales with over $280,000 per day. Despite never topping the weekly or monthly chart and having a little less than half a year to chart, "Roly-Poly" managed to become the best-performing song of the year on the Gaon Digital Chart. It went on to become the best-selling song of 2011 in South Korea with over 4,000,000 digital downloads, the highest figure for a K-pop girl group single on Gaon in the 2010s.

== In popular culture ==
"Roly-Poly" appeared on multiple South Korean television series and films since its release including in the first episode of KBS's Dream High 2 in 2012. The song was also played in the 2011 horror movie Ghastly. In 2017, the song was played on the 7th episode of the KBS drama Manhole. The song was covered on the 2019 TV series Welcome To Waikiki 2. It was also played on the 5th episode of the 2020 SBS drama Backstreet Rookie in a form of karaoke. In 2021, it was played in the first episode of the webtoon-based drama Work Later, Drink Now. The same year, its Japanese single album appeared on KBS2's drama Cheat on Me If You Can.

== Legacy ==
Since its release, "Roly-Poly" achieved nationwide popularity due to its retro influences and outfits. The song's popularity spread internationally following T-ara's constant promotion overseas. It has been played in several television series, films and campaigns. K-pop artists such as Oh My Girl, Itzy, Wanna One, Mamamoo, Davichi, STAYC, Iz*One, DKZ,, and Navillera, covered the song on different occasions. Internationally, it was covered by Vietnamese singer Nhat Thuy on Your Face Sounds Familiar in 2015, by Hoang Yen Chibi on Star is Star, and by Hari Won on the Green Festival the same year. The later performed it again in 2017.

In May 2012, the Copacabana version was rearranged into for full orchestra and performed by the Nanyang Polytechnic Chinese Orchestra. It was later performed again in 2019 by the Temasek Polytechnic Chinese Orchestra at their annual concert. In September 2012, Kim Shin-Young performed a parody of the song on MBC's World-Changing Quiz on the Chuseok special episode which gathered attention for the unique stage presented by the comedian. On 24 December 2012, Gag concert members Park Ji-sun, Jang Do-yeon, Oh Na-mi, Kim Min-kyung, Park Na-rae, Heo Min, Park So-young, Heo Anna and Ahn So-mi covered the song on 2011 KBS Entertainment Awards. On May 17 2019, the song was covered by a group of female university professors called "SSAM" at the 28th Gamatbeol University Festival held at Gumi University.

In June 2017, South Korean girl group G-reyish released "Onny GoGo" using similar disco style of the 1980s and modern pop music elements. In an interview with Financial News, the group said "T-ara presented the concept of retro after going through many activities [...] we hope that we can present a retro style as soon as we debut, so that fans can be impressed by us in the future". Member Yena Jung also said, "It's something I'm grateful for just being mentioned with T-ara." In May 2021, during their release showcase, Rocket Punch revealed that they used "Roly-Poly" and its performances as an influence for their 80s inspired song "Ring Ring", where they said "If you look at the stages, there are many things we can imitate from the props and gestures." In 2021, Indonesian singer Sonia released a remake of the song titled "Goyang Barbie" under Sentral Musik records.

In March 2012, "Roly-Poly" was used as a representative political campaign song by the Saenuri Party ahead of the 19th general election of South Korea. It was reported that more than ₩10 million were spent to use the song in addition to the ₩2 million copyright fees and production costs. On March 22, 2018, it was performed by Hari Won as a representative Korean song at the reception party held to welcome South Korea's former president Moon Jae In in Vietnam.

== Our Youth, Roly Poly ==
Our Youth, Roly Poly
- Promotional poster
- Original title: 우리들의 청춘 롤리폴리
- Original language: Korean
- Based on: Roly-Poly
- Genre: Musical

Premiere
- Date: 13 January 2012
- Place: Seongnam Art Center Opera House
- Directed by: Han Jin-Seop
- www.rolypoly2012.com

The song also received two musical adaptations in 2012. "Roly-Poly" was made into a stage musical starring T-ara's Hyomin, Jiyeon and Soyeon, Kang Min-kyung (Davichi), Jang Hye-jin (I Am a Singer), veteran musical actress Park Hae-mi, Han Ji-sub, Kim Jae-hee and Yoon Young-joon. The first press conference for the musical was held on 4 January at the Seoul Press Center. Due to the success of the musical, another one was produced and premiered on 2 May 2012. However, the T-ara members did not participate in it due to their busy schedules.

== Accolades ==
=== Awards and nominations ===
Award ceremony	Year	Category	Result	Ref.
Annual Home Shopping Awards	2011	Top 10 Songs	Won	
ArcH Music Awards	2011	Top 10 Songs	Won	
Bugs Music Awards	2011	Song of the Year	Won	
KBS Music Festival	2011	Song of the Year	Nominated	
KU Awards	2011	Dance of The Year	Nominated	
Melon Music Awards	2011	Best Music Video	Won	
Melon Music Awards	2011	Song of the Year	Nominated	
Mnet 20's Choice Awards	2011	20's Online Music	Nominated	
Mnet Asian Music Awards	2011	Best Dance Performance – Female Group	Nominated	
Mnet Asian Music Awards	2011	Song of the Year	Nominated	
MTV Best of the Best Awards	2011	Best Music Video	Nominated	
MTV Best of the Best Awards	2011	Best Live	Nominated	
Gaon Chart Music Awards	2012	Song of the Month – July	Won	
Korean Music Awards	2012	Best Dance & Electronic Song	Nominated	
Seoul Music Awards	2012	Best Song	Won	
Seoul Music Awards	2012	Main Prize (Bonsang)	Nominated	
Tower Records Awards	2012	Single of the Year	Nominated	

=== Music program awards ===
Program	Date	Ref.
M Countdown (Mnet)	14 July 2011	
M Countdown (Mnet)	21 July 2011	
Inkigayo (SBS)	24 July 2011	

=== Listicles ===
In 2017, SBS PopAsia ranked "Roly Poly" 5th on their list of T-ara's best songs, while British magazine NME placed it at 2nd in 2024.

Publisher	Year	List	Rank	Ref.
Edge Media	2011	2011's Top 10 K-Pop Songs	4	
YesAsia	2011	Bst K-Pop Singles	8	
Stereogum	2012	Top 20 Best K-Pop Videos	12	
Spin	2012	The 21 Greatest K-Pop Songs of All Time	16	
Y Magazine	2014	120 Greatest Dance Tracks of All Time	92	
The Dong-a Ilbo	2016	Best Female Idol Songs According To The Public	14	
Billboard	2019	The 100 Greatest K-Pop Songs of the 2010s	25	
Popkultur	2019	The 82 Greatest K-Pop Songs of All Time	49	
YouTube Music	2020	Best Songs of All Time	Placed	
YouTube Music	2020	Best Dance Tracks of All Time	Placed	
Melon	2021	Top 100 K-pop Songs of All Time	64	
KKBOX Taiwan	2021	Top K-POP songs of 2011	Placed	
Vice	2021	Best Bubbly K-pop Songs	Placed	
Tidal	2021	Best K-pop Hits From The 2010s	Placed	
Digital Trends	2023	The 50 best K-pop songs of all time	Placed	
Hello Music Theory	2024	15 Of The Best K-Pop Songs Of All Time	12	

== Track listing ==
Japanese single Version A
No.	Title	Lyrics	Music	Length
1.	"Roly-Poly" (Japanese ver.)	Shinsadong Tiger, Choi Kyu Sung, Kim Boa, Shoko Fujibayashi (Japanese lyrics)	Shinsadong Tiger, Choi Kyu-Sung	3:36
2.	"Lies (Japanese Ver.)" (コジンマル～嘘～)	Cho Young Soo, Kei (Japanese lyrics)	Cho Young Soo	3:49
3.	"Roly-Poly" (Instrumental)			3:36
4.	"Lies" (Instrumental)			3:46
Total length:				14:44

Version B
No.	Title	Lyrics	Music	Length
1.	"Roly-Poly" (Japanese ver.)	Shinsadong Tiger, Choi Kyu-Sung, Kim Boa, Seiko Fujibayashi (Japanese lyrics)	Shinsadong Tiger, Choi Kyu-Sung	3:36
2.	"Apple is A" (Japanese ver.)	Cho Young Soo, Seiko Fujibayashi (Japanese lyrics)	Cho Young Soo	3:10
3.	"Roly-Poly" (Instrumental)			3:36
4.	"Apple is A" (Instrumental)			3:08
Total length:				13:28

Regular edition
No.	Title	Lyrics	Music	Length
1.	"Roly-Poly" (Japanese ver.)	Shinsadong Tiger, Choi Kyu-Sung, Kim Boa, Seiko Fujibayashi (Japanese lyrics)	Shinsadong Tiger, Choi Kyu-Sung	3:36
2.	"Roly-Poly in Copacabana (Japanese ver.)" (Roly-Poly in コパカバーナ; (Japanese ver.))	Shinsadong Tiger, Choi Kyu-Sung, Kim Boa, Seiko Fujibayashi (Japanese lyrics)	Shinsadong Tiger, Choi Kyu-Sung	3:31
3.	"Roly-Poly" (Instrumental)			3:36
4.	"Roly-Poly in Copacabana" (Instrumental)			3:33
5.	"Bo Peep Bo Peep" (Korean version; Live ver. from T-ARA First Show Case in SHIBUYA-AX 2011.7.5) (Bonus track)	Shinsadong Tiger, Choi Kyu-Sung	Shinsadong Tiger, Choi Kyu-Sung	4:12
Total length:				18:24

Version A DVD
No.	Title	Length
1.	"Roly-Poly (Japanese ver.) Music Video"
2.	"コジンマル～嘘～ (Japanese ver.) Music Video"

Version B DVD
No.	Title	Length
1.	"Roly-Poly (Japanese ver.) Music Video Dance Feature ver."
2.	"Roly-Poly (Japanese ver.) Music Video Making"

== Charts ==
=== Korean version ===
Weekly charts
Chart (2011)	Peak position
South Korea (Gaon)	2
South Korea (K-pop Hot 100)	1
Japan (Oricon)	3
Japan (Japan Hot 100)	5

Year-end charts
Chart (2011)	Position
South Korea (Gaon)	1

== Sales ==
Country	Sales
South Korea (digital)	4,077,885
Japan (physical)	62,774
