= Bo Peep Bo Peep =

2009 single by T-ara

- Japanese single cover

Single by T-ara

from the album Absolute First Album and Jewelry Box
- B-side: "Love Me!" (Note: "You Drive Me Crazy" (Japanese Ver.))
- Released: November 27, 2009; September 28, 2011 (JP)
- Genre: K-pop; dance-pop; electropop; Synth-pop
- Length: 3:46
- Label: CJ E&M; Core Contents Media; EMI
- Songwriters: Shinsadong Tiger; Choi Kyu-sung; Zoop (JP)
- Producers: Shinsadong Tiger; Choi Kyu-sung

T-ara singles chronology
"TTL (Time to Love)" (2009)	"Bo Peep Bo Peep" (2009)	"You Drive Me Crazy" (2010)

Music video
- "Bo Peep Bo Peep" (Japanese Ver.) on YouTube

"Bo Peep Bo Peep" is a song by South Korean girl group T-ara. It is the lead track from the album Absolute First Album. The song won 5 weekly number one awards on KBS Music Bank and SBS Inkigayo. It was later re-recorded in Japanese for the group's debut single, which was released on September 28, 2011. They are the first Korean group to debut at the number one spot in both Oricon's weekly chart and Billboard Japan Hot 100. The single has sold a total of more than 91,343 copies to date and was certified Gold for a shipment of over 100,000 paid downloads by the RIAJ.

== Background and release ==
For the group's comeback, T-ara released music video teasers for the songs "Bo Peep Bo Peep" and "Like the First Time". Around 9,000 netizens from over 9 music portal sites voted in a poll determining which song will become the album's title track, but despite "Like the First Time" being the winning song and lead track to the album, the group promoted "Bo Peep Bo Peep" on music programs after it was well received by critics who felt that it would be the group's first hit. The group held their comeback stage on KBS's Music Bank on December 4. The group performed a Christmas version of the song on Music Bank on December 20, 2009 and on SBS's Inkigayo on December 25. New outfits, hair, and accessories were prepared for the special stages. To celebrate the new year, a traditional version of the song was performed Music Bank on January 1st, 2010, on Show! Music Core on January 2nd, 2010, and on Inkigayo on January 3rd, 2010.

According to Bae Yoon Jung, the song's choreographer, the dance took three days to create since there wasn't much time left to the first broadcast date, and cost ₩4 million.

On August 4, 2011, it was announced that T-ara would be debuting in Japan with a Japanese version of "Bo Peep Bo Peep". The single was released on September 28 as two limited editions and a regular edition, with a Japanese version of their song "I Go Crazy Because of You" as the accompanying b-side. The music video was released on September 1 on the Japanese cable television network Space Shower TV.

== Commercial performance ==
"Bo Peep Bo Peep" debuted at 4 in its 3rd of release on the newly established Gaon Chart. The song won 5 weekly number one awards on KBS Music Bank and SBS Inkigayo. It sold more than 1,600,000 copies in 2010 in South Korea. Upon release, the music video debuted at No. 1 on GOMTV's Weekly chart and spent 4 weeks on the top spot. On January 4, 2010, It was reported that "Bo Peep Bo Peep" entered the platform's "Hall of Fame" making T-ara only the 6th group the achieve the feat. The song was also popular among middle schoolers in the country.

The Japanese version debuted on Oricon's Daily Chart at No. 1 with 20,068 copies sold on the first day making them the first Korean girl group to achieve the number one spot and the third Korean group to reach the top three of the charts after MBLAQ's "Your Luv" and SHINee's "Replay". The single debuted at number one on Oricon's Weekly Chart with 49,712 copies sold and number one on Billboard Japan Hot 100, making them the first foreign group and also the first Korean girl group to debut at number one. It ended up at 97 on Oricon Yearly singles ranking and at 86 on Billboard Japan End-year chart. The single later received 3 certification from RIAJ, a shipment of over 100,000 copies in paid downloads and Full-length ringtone as well as shipments of over 100,000 physical copies. It also ended up on "2011 iTunes (Japan) Rewind" Top 100 singles of the year at 86.

== Mini Live tour ==
=== Overview ===
In 2011, T-ara kicked off a promotional tour for the Japanese single of Bo Peep Bo Peep, titled The Official Japan debut Mini Live, in four Japanese cities. It started in Tokyo on September 29, 2011, at Lazona Kawasaki Plaza. The event reportedly had a record-breaking 17,000 people in attendance. Over 40 domestic media outlets, as well as 120 reporters and broadcasters attended the showcase. The group later held an exclusive fan event after the concert for 2,500 people chosen in advance. The performance was followed by two performances in Nagoya and Osaka, on September 30, and October 1, respectively. Another performance was added in Fukuoka on the same day as the Osaka performance due to high demand.

=== Tour dates ===
Date	City	Country	Venue	Attendance	Total attendance	Ref.
September 29, 2011	Tokyo	Japan	Lazona Kawasaki Plaza	17,000	36,000	
September 30, 2011	Nagoya	Japan	Asunal Kanayama	6,000	36,000	
October 1, 2011	Osaka	Japan	Abeno Cues Town	7,000	36,000	
October 1, 2011	Fukuaka	Japan	Marinoa City	6,000	36,000	

== Cover versions ==
In 2010, Taiwanese entertainer Lotus Wang (王彩樺) did a cover of the song under the title "Bobee 保庇". It became a dance craze and was picked by CNN's Phil Han for the "Best Viral Video of the Week", which led to controversy from Korean netizens complaining that the song 'wasn't original' and that they failed to mention the original title or T-ara's name at all.

== In popular culture ==
In 2012, Captain Kim Hang-ah (Played by Ha Ji-won) danced to "Bo Peep Bo Peep" on the 7th episode of the MBC drama The King 2 Hearts. On April 12, 2012, Ha Ji-Won revealed she was taught the choreography personally by the song's choreographer Jeon Hong-bok. The actress was praised for her dancing skills. However, on screen she had to give off the image that her character cannot dance well, and "that made it even more difficult".

On May 29, 2010, the musical male duo Norazo performed a parody of version of "Bo Peep Bo Peep" at their solo concert "The Norazo Show". In 2012, the Japanese version of the song was added to Just Dance Wii 2's playlist. In 2025, the song's bear paw gloves were used by PLAVE at their Korean concert. In February 2, 2026, Culinary Class Wars star chef Jung Ho Young performed a parody of the song on JTBC's Please Take Care of My Refrigerator . Hyomin reposted the video on her Instagram story praising the chef for his performance. In 2026, Stayc's Isa covered the song as her solo stage at the group's 2026 Fan Concert Tour starting night. Girl group Navillera covered the song on multiple occasions in 2026, including, at Ara Festival, Sinchon K-pop Show, and Global Artlink Festival.

== Accolades ==
=== Listicles ===
NME ranked the sing at No. 5 on its list of best T-ARA songs to date describing how took Asia by storm for its playful nature and an easy to follow choreography.

Publication	Year	List	Rank	Ref.
Rolling Stone	2023	The 100 Greatest Songs in the History of Korean Pop Music	45th	
The Forty-Five	2023	The 45 best K-pop songs of all-time	32nd	
Tidal	2023	Best K-pop Hits From The 2000s	Placed	
Amazon Music	2023	2000s Greatest K-Pop Hits	7th	

=== Awards and nominations ===
Organization	Year	Award	Result	Ref.
Annual Home Shopping Awards	2010	Top 10 Songs	Won	
Bugs Music Awards	2010	Song of the Year	Nominated	
Bugs Music Awards	2010	Music Video of the Year	Nominated	
Mnet Asian Music Awards	2010	Best Female Dance Performance	Nominated	
Tower Records Awards	2011	Single of the Year	Nominated	

Music program awards
Program	Date	Ref.
Music Bank	January 1, 2010	
Music Bank	January 8, 2010	
Inkigayo	January 3, 2010	
Inkigayo	January 10, 2010	
Inkigayo	January 17, 2010	

== Track listing ==
Japanese single
No.	Title	Lyrics	Music	Length
1.	"Bo Peep Bo Peep" (Japanese version)	Zoop	Shinsadong Tiger, Choi Kyu-sung	3:49
2.	"Love Me!" (あなたのせいで狂いそう; You Drive Me Crazy Japanese Ver.)		Cho Young Soo, Kim Tae Hyun	3:17
3.	"Bo Peep Bo Peep" (Inst.)			3:49
4.	"LOVE ME!" (Inst.)			3:15
Total length:				14:08

DVD
No.	Title	Length
1.	"Bo Peep Bo Peep (Japan Original ver.)"	7:06

== Credits and personnel ==
Credits adapted from the album's liner notes.

Studio

- Studio-T – recording
- Vitamin Studio – recording, mixing
- Sonic Korea – mastering

Personnel

- T-ara – vocals
- Shinsadong Tiger – producer, Korean lyrics, composition, arrangement, instrumental, programming
- Choi Kyu-sung – producer, Korean lyrics, composition, arrangement, instrumental, programming
- Zoop – Japanese lyrics
- Kim Bo-ah – background vocals
- Lee Myun-sook – recording
- Song Joo-yong – recording
- Sun Young – recording, mixing assistant
- Ko Seung-wook – mixing
- Jeon Hoon – mastering
- Kang Seung-hee – mastering assistant

== Charts ==
=== Weekly charts ===
Chart (2010–11)	Peak position
Japan Singles Chart (Oricon)	1
Japan (Japan Hot 100)	1
Japan (RIAJ Digital Track Chart)	3
Japan (RIAJ Digital Track Chart) ("Love Me! ~Anata no Sei de Kurisou~")	91
South Korea (Gaon)	4

=== Year-end charts ===
Chart (2010–11)	Position
Japan Yearly Singles (Oricon)	97
Japan (Japan Hot 100)	86
South Korea (Gaon)	152

== Sales and certifications ==
Region	Certification	Certified units/sales
Japan (RIAJ) Physical	Gold	100,000^{^}
Japan (RIAJ) Digital	Gold	100,000^{*}
Japan (RIAJ) Full-length ringtone	Gold	100,000^{*}
South Korea (Gaon)	—	1,609,000
^{*} Sales figures based on certification alone.^{^} Shipments figures based on certification alone.

== Release history ==
Country	Date	Format	Label
South Korea	November 27, 2009	Digital download	Core Contents Media
Japan	September 28, 2011	CD single	EMI Music Japan
Japan	October 5, 2011	Digital download	EMI Music Japan
