= Hyomin filmography =

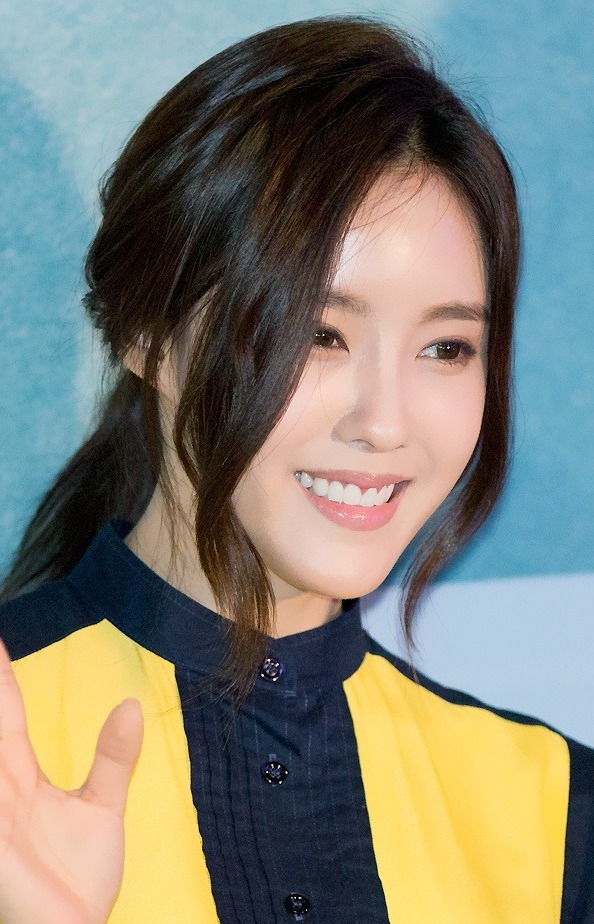
- Hyomin at Jinx!!! VIP premiere
- Film: 2
- Television series: 5
- Web series: 4
- Television show: 37
- Hosting: 11
- Music videos: 18
- Narrating: 1
- Theatre: 2
- Advertising: 32

Hyomin is a South Korean singer, songwriter and actress. She debuted as a singer with T-ara in 2009 and has since been active in the entertainment industry. Her first major acting project was My Girlfriend is a Nine-Tailed Fox as Ban Sun-Nyeon the drama saw huge success during its run and helped develop Hyomin's acting career.

Hyomin is mostly known for her roles in the period drama Gye Baek (2011) as Cho-young, horror film Ghastly (2011) as Yu-Rin and Japanese film Jinx!!! (2013) as Yoon Ji-ho.

== Film ==
Year	Title	Role	Country of origin	Notes	Ref.
2011	Ghastly	Yu-rin	South Korea	Main role	
2013	Jinx!!!	Yoon Ji-ho	Japan	Main role	

== Television series ==
Year	Title	Role	Notes	Ref.
2005	Sassy Girl Chun-hyang	Chun-hyang's junior	Cameo	
2010	Master of Study		Cameo	
2010	My Girlfriend Is a Gumiho	Ban Sun-nyeo	Supporting role	
2011	Gyebaek	Cho-young	Supporting role	
2012	The Thousandth Man	Gu Mi-mo	Main role	

== Web series ==
Year	Title	Role	Notes	Ref.
2010	Bubi Bubi	Herself	Main role	
2015	Sweet Temptation	Hyo-jin	Main role	
2020	HyomStore	Herself	Main role	
2021	Midnight Thriller	Cha Hye-joo	Main role	

== Television shows ==
Year	Title	Role	Notes	Ref.
2009	M!Countdown	Special host	K-Chart announcer	
2009–10	Invincible Youth	Cast member		
2010	Show! Music Core	Special host		
2010	M!Countdown	Special host		
2010	My Partner	Main cast		
2011	Idol health beauty contest	Main cast	Lunar new year special show	
2011	Big Star X-Files	Main cast		
2012	We Got Married	Main cast	Chinese version	
2012	Global Super Idol	Mentor		
2012	2012 Idol Star Athletics – Swimming Championships	Contestant	Received Silver medal for 4 X 50 m	
2013	Immortal Songs	Contestant		
2013	Show! Music Core	Special host	With Noh Hong-chul and Kim So-hyun	
2015	The Show	Special host		
2016	Master of Driving Straight	Cast member		
2016	Attraction TV	Host		
2016	Idol King Of Cooking	Main cast	Chuseok Special program	
2017	Mix And The City	Main cast		
2017	It's Okay To Go A Little Crazy	Cast member		
2018	King of Mask Singer	Contestant		
2018	Cart Show 2	Cast member		
2018	My Friend's Blind Date	Host		
2019	Must Go To Know	Cast member		
2019	Sisters	Cast member		
2019	Let's Eat Dinner Together	Cast member		
2019	Beauty Room	Host	Beauty mentor	
2019	Beauty Time	Host		
2020	Beauty Time 2	Host		
2020	One-Day Class	Host		
2020	Senna's Items	Host	Presented by Cosmopolitan	
2020	Who Am I	Judge	Vietnamese Show	
2020	Showtreat Fighter	Cast member		
2021	Cooking - The Birth of a Cooking King	Contestant		
2021	Cele Beauty+	Main cast		
2022	Happy Dream Lotto	Golden hand		
2022–2023	What's In My Bag?	Recurring Guest		
2024	Trend Shopper 2	Host		
2026	Stars' Top Recipe at Fun-Staurant	Contestant		

== Music videos ==
Year	Song	Artist	Album	Ref
As guest actress
2006	"Unlock"	SS510	S.T 01 Now	
2008	"Heaven"	F.T Island	Colorful Sensibility Part 2	
2008	"Smooth Break-Up"	SG Wannabe	My Friend	
2010	"Going To You"	Yoon Shi-yoon	Bubi Bubi OST Part.3	
2011	"Heaven"	Davichi	Ghastly OST	
2011	"Till The End"	Soyeon, SeeYa, Lee Bo-Ram	Ghastly OST	
As singer
2010	"Wonder Woman"	Hyomin, Eunjung, Davichi and Seeya	Non-album single	
2011	"Beautiful Girl"	Hyomin (with Brave Brothers and Electroboyz)	Non-album single	
2014	"Nice Body"	Hyomin (feat. Loco)	Make Up (EP)	
2014	"Nice Body" (Dance Ver.)	Hyomin (feat. Loco)	Make Up (EP)	
2016	"Sketch"	Hyomin	Sketch (EP)	
2016	"Sketch" (19 Ver.)	Hyomin	Sketch (EP)	
2018	"MANGO"	Hyomin	Allure (EP)	
2018	"MANGO" (Chinese Ver.)	Hyomin	Allure (EP)	
2019	"U Um U Um"	Hyomin	Allure (EP)	
2019	"U Um U Um" (Chinese Ver.)	Hyomin	Allure (EP)	
2019	"Allure"	Hyomin	Allure (EP)	
2019	"Allure" (Chinese Ver.)	Hyomin	Allure (EP)	

== Hosting ==
Year	Title	City	Country	Ref.
2010	Coed School Music Video Premiere and Press Conference	Seoul	South Korea	
2012	M!Countdown Special Concert	Bangkok	Thailand	
2012	29th Pro Baseball Golden Gloves Awards	Seoul	South Korea	
2017	DIA's "YOLO Trip" Press Conference	Seoul	South Korea	
2018	11th Asian Film Awards	Macau	China	
2018	G-Market Concert	Seoul	South Korea	
2019	33th Golden Disk Awards	Seoul	South Korea	
2020	G-Market Concert	Seoul	South Korea	
2022	Say No More Pop-up Store	Seoul	South Korea	
2023	Hyomin Sour Pre-launch event	Seoul	South Korea	
2024	Days Daze X Hyomin Sour Welcome Summer Party	Seoul	South Korea	

== Musical ==
Year	Title	Role	Notes	Ref
2009–10	I Really Really Like You	Hong Jung-hwa	Main role	
2012	Our Youth, Roly Poly	Han Joo-young	Main role	

== Narration ==
Year	Title	Artist	Ref
2012	Gangkiz Freedom In Europe	Gangkiz	

== Advertising ==
Brand	Year	Promoting	Title	Theme song	Region	Notes	Ref.
Brave I	2016	BI Real Beauty Cream	Brave Brothers Cosmetics Brave CF	Original CM track	South Korea		
W Lab	2016	Pocket Bunny Lip Tint	W.Lab X Jumei	—N/a	China	Promotional live	
UGG	2016	Caleigh Zip-Front Wedge Boots	#MyClassicalStyle	—N/a	South Korea	For 16F/W	
Adidas	2017	Alphabounce	Adidas miRUN Busan	—N/a	South Korea	Also Style runner	
MCM Worldwide	2018	PUMA x MCM track jacket	#MCMSS19	"MANGO" by Hyomin	Global		
GGPX	2018	2018 Fall Collection	Sloanie Ranger	—N/a	South Korea		
GGPX	2018	2018 Winter Collection	Sloanie Ranger	—N/a	South Korea	Exclusive model	
GGPX	2019	2019 Spring Collection	ACID VIBE	—N/a	South Korea		
GGPX	2019	2019 Summer Collection	Alice In Wonderland	—N/a	South Korea		
S By Stella	2018	Fall Collection	HYOMIN X STELLA	—N/a	China		
S By Stella	2018	Fall Collection	—N/a	"Keep the Prices Down" by Blanket Music	China		
S By Stella	2018	Fall Collection	One Shoe Can Change Your Life	"Cat's Corps" by Blanket Music	China		
S By Stella	2018	Winter Collection	Picnic	"A Walk In The Woods" by Ken Verheecke	China		
S By Stella	2018	Winter Collection	Party	—N/a	China		
Shinsegae Duty Free	2018	Studio S	Studio S X HYOMIN	—N/a	South Korea		
VT Cosmetics	2019	MINITT	MINITT X HYOMIN	—N/a	South Korea		
Stretch Angels	2019	19 S/S Collection	STRETCH ANGELS X HYOMIN	"U Um U Um" by Hyomin	South Korea		
Lovey Dovey	2019	Perfume Fabric Mist	Lovey Dovey X Hyomin	—N/a	Vietnam		
Chevrolet	2020	Chevrolet Spark	Seven Fairies Popping out of A Spark	"Prologue" by John Williams	South Korea		
MONTBLAC	2020	M_Gram 4810 Collection	—N/a	—N/a	South Korea		
Abib Global	2021	—N/a	—N/a	"Soft Feeling" by Cheel	South Korea	China ambassador	
Nike	2021	PMO X NIKE Collection	PMO X NIKE	—N/a	South Korea		
Blue Cell	2021	Subiome Cleansing Line	Hyomin Blue Cell Mirco biome CF	"Gentleman" by Offshane	South Korea		
Toitt Bags Milan	2022	TOITT 5th Collection	Tie a Knot!	—N/a	South Korea	Also producer and stylist	
One-Off Golf	2023	—N/a	—N/a	—N/a	South Korea	Shot in Hawaii	
ActozSoft	2023	New release	—N/a	—N/a	South Korea	Unreleased	
Hyomin Sour	2023	Sour Lemon	BREWGURU X HYOMIN	—N/a	South Korea	Also producer and director	
Hyomin Sour	2024	Tomato Flavor	—N/a	—N/a	South Korea	Also producer and director	
Veganery	2025	Hyomin's Diet Routine Package	BE, VEGANERY	"Nice Body" by Hyomin	South Korea	Exclusive model	
Eyetist	2025	Contact lenses	What Your Eyes Tell Us	"Cry Boy" by Sunburnkids	South Korea	Also producer and director	
Rare Raw	2025	Slope sofa	Slope Sofa By Hyomin	Suzanne by RAYE	South Korea		
Loewe	2025	The Loewe Puzzle bag	10th anniversary of Loewe Puzzle bag	—N/a	Global		
Olivazumo	2026	Hyomin's Inner Beauty Recommendation	Red, Yellow, and My Best Choice	—N/a	South Korea		
