= List of Hyomin live performances =

Hyomin Live Performances
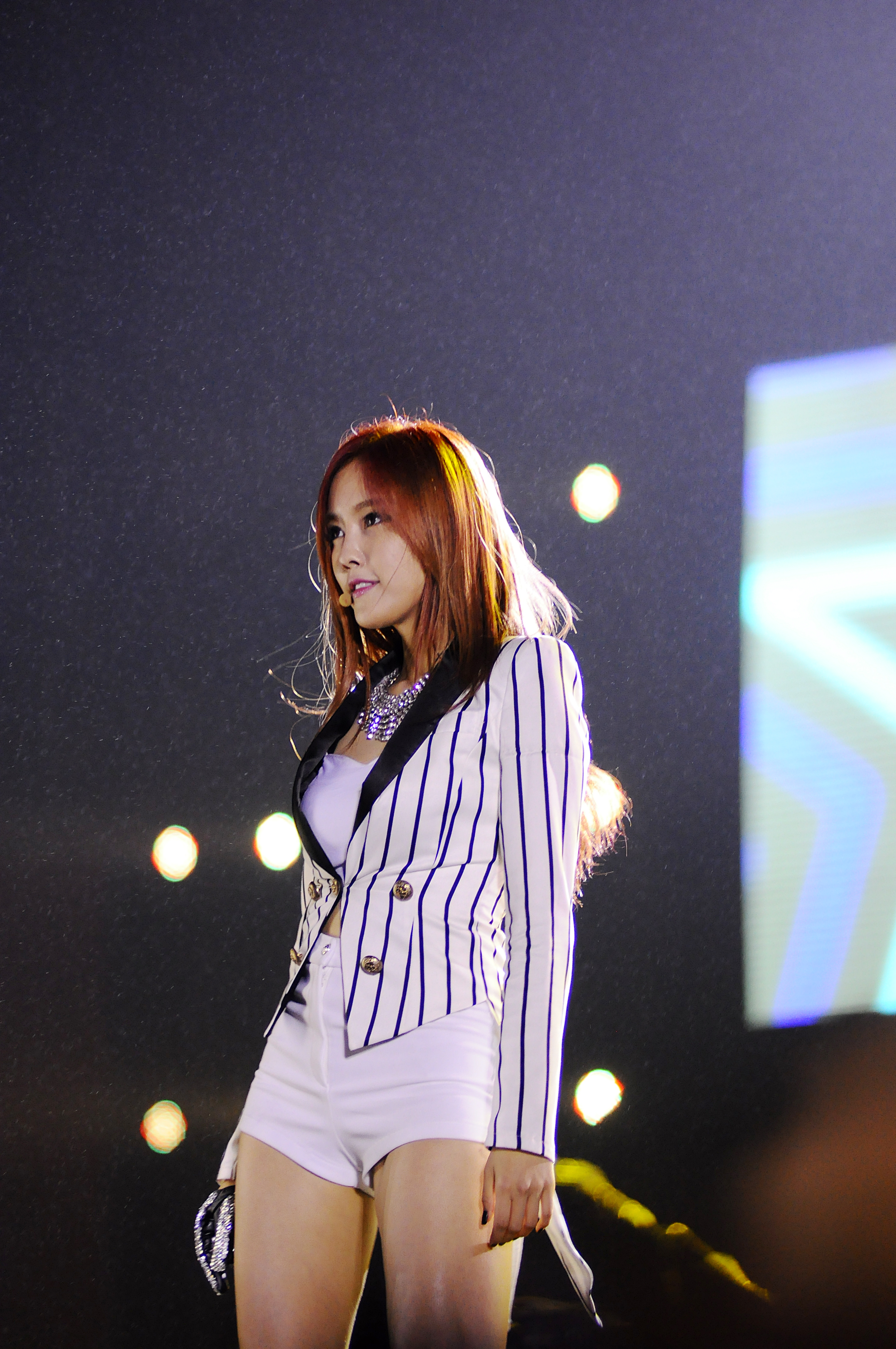
- Hyomin performing in Hanoi, Vietnam, November 2012
- One-off Concerts: 3
- Fanmeetings: 8
- Award Shows: 3
- Music Festivals: 3
- Joint Concerts & Tours: 10
- TV Shows & Specials: 61
- Radio Shows: 3

South Korean singer Hyomin five fan meetings and three solo concerts since her solo debut in 2014.

Hyomin's first Tour "Allure Cosmo Tour" was planned to be held across East Asia starting from Hong Kong. The tour was meant to promote Hyomin's third mini-album Allure, however, the tour was postponed and then canceled due Performance licensing issues with venue owners.

In 2018, Hyomin held her first fan meeting in Tokyo, Japan followed by another in 2019, a third fan meeting was planned for 2020, but due to the spread of COVID-19 pandemic, the fan meeting was canceled.

In 2019, Hyomin became the first idol girl group member to sell-out a solo fan meeting in Vietnam attracting over 1,000 fans.

== Concert tours ==
=== Canceled shows ===
Dates	Title	Associated album	Venue	Region	Reason	Ref.
May 18, 2019	Allure Cosmo Tour	Allure	KITEC Rotunda 2	Hong Kong	Performance licensing issues	

== Showcases ==
Year	Dates	Title	Venue	City	Country	Ref.
2016	March 16, 2016	Sketch Showcase	Lotte Card Art Center	Seoul	South Korea	
2018	September 12, 2018	Mango Showcase	Ilji Art Hall	Seoul	South Korea	
2018	March 2, 2018	Hyomin's Jazz Night Live	Jazz in Black	Seoul	South Korea	

== Fan meetings ==
Year	Dates	Title	City	Country	Venue	Attendance	Ref.
2016	March 3, 2016	"What Should I Do?"	Thailand	Bangkok	Aksra Theatre	ㅡ	
2018	November 8, 2018	Hyomin First Japan Fan Meeting	Tokyo	Japan	Shinjuku BLAZE	ㅡ	
2019	April 19, 2019	Hyomin Second Japan Fan Meeting	Tokyo	Japan	Shinjuku RENY	ㅡ	
2019	July 27, 2019	Hyomin First Vietnam Fan Meeting	Ho Chi Minh City	Vietnam	Hoa Binh Theatre	1,000	
2020	October 11, 2020	Along With Hyomin, Us	Seoul	South Korea	Online	ㅡ	
2020	October 10, 2020	"On & Off" Secret Date	Seoul	South Korea	Online	ㅡ	
2026	May 23, 2026	"Hyomin's Birthday Fan Meeting"	Wuhan	China	Private venue	ㅡ	
2026	May 30, 2026	"Hyomin's Birthday Fan Meeting"	Ho Chi Minh City	Vietnam	C30 Stage	ㅡ	
2026	September 12, 2026	"My Hyomin Moment"	Macau	Macau	Galaxy Macau (Note: At G Box)	ㅡ	

=== Canceled shows ===
Year	Dates	Title	City	Country	Reason	Ref.
2020	February 23, 2020	Hyomin Third Japan Fan Meeting	Tokyo	Japan	COVID-19 pandemic	
2026	July 25, 2026	"My Hyomin Moment"	Shanghai	China	Hallyu ban	

== Award shows ==
Year	Dates	Title	City	Country	Performed song(s)	Ref.
2009	December 31, 2009	KBS Entertainment Awards (Grand opening)	Seoul	South Korea	Dance break; "Muzik"; "Abracadabra"; "I Want You Back"; "Gee; "Mister; "Love Rain" (Note: 4Minute, Brown Eyed Girls, Secret, Girls' Generation, Kara, and Kim Tae-woo cover); "Bo Peep Bo peep"	
2013	January 16, 2013	27th Golden Disk Awards	Kuala Lumpur	Malaysia	"I Can't Cry" (Note: Fin.K.L cover)	
2017	April 8, 2017	YinYueTai V-Chart Awards	Cotai	Macau	"Sketch"	

== Music festivals ==
Year	Dates	Title	City	Country	Performed song(s)	Ref.
2011	December 31, 2011	MBC Music Festival	Seoul	South Korea	"Now" (Note: Fin.K.L cover)	
2014	August 6, 2014	Ulsan Summer Festival	Ulsan	South Korea	"Nice Body"	
2014	August 11, 2014	2014 Korea Music Festival	Sokcho	South Korea	"Nice Body"	

== Joint concerts and tours ==
Year	Dates	Title	City	Country	Performed song(s)	Ref.
2010	June 22, 2010	16th Dream Concert	Seoul	South Korea	"Love"	
2012	February 8, 2012	Music Bank World Tour	Paris	France	"Sex Appeal" (Note: Bueno Clinic cover); "Harder, Better, Faster, Stronger" (Note: Daft Punk cover)	
2014	July 11, 2014	4th Hope Concert	Gangwon	South Korea	"Nice Body"	
2014	August 16, 2014	DMZ Peace Concert	Gyeonggi	South Korea	"Nice Body"	
2016	June 6, 2016	22nd Dream Concert	Seoul	South Korea	"Sketch"	
2018	September 25, 2018	2018 Peace Concert	Gangwon	South Korea	"Mango"	
2018	September 28, 2018	V Heartbeat Concert	Ho Chi Minh City	Vietnam	"Nice Body"	
2019	July 26, 2019	V Heartbeat Concert	Ho Chi Minh City	Vietnam	"Allure"; "Cabinet"	
2019	September 21, 2019	Korea National Youth Day (Opening Ceremony)	Seoul	South Korea	"Nice Body"; "Allure"; "U Um U Um"	
2026	September 29, 2026	Airo Entertainment Launch (Opening Ceremony)	Ho Chi Minh City	Vietnam	"Nice Body"; "Overcome"; "Roxie"	

== TV shows and specials ==
Year	Date	Show	Performed song(s)	Ref
2009	July 29, 2009	Radio Star	"Memories"	
2009	August 27, 2009	M Countdown	"How Come"	
2009	September 25, 2009	Music Core	"Love"	
2010	May 7, 2010	Music Bank	"Love"	
2010	May 27, 2010	M Countdown	"Coffee Over Milk"	
2010	December 19, 2010	Quiz to Change the World	"I'll Give You All of My Love"	
2013	May 5, 2013	People Looking For A Laugh	"Les Misérables"	
2013	December 28, 2013	Immortal Songs 2: Singing the Legend	"Not Anyone Can Love"	
2014	January 25, 2014	Immortal Songs 2: Singing the Legend	"Faraway Home"	
2014	January 25, 2014	Music Travel Yesterday	"Still You"	
2014	July 3, 2014	M Countdown	"Fake It"	
2014	July 5, 2014	Show! Music Core	"Nice Body"	
2014	July 6, 2014	Inkigayo	"Nice Body"	
2014	July 9, 2014	Show Champion	"Nice Body"	
2014	July 10, 2014	M Countdown	"Nice Body"	
2014	July 11, 2014	Simply K-Pop	"Nice Body"	
2014	July 12, 2014	Show! Music Core	"Nice Body"	
2014	July 13, 2014	Inkigayo	"Nice Body"	
2014	July 17, 2014	M Countdown	"Nice Body"	
2014	July 18, 2014	Simply K-Pop	"Nice Body"	
2014	July 23, 2014	Show Champion	"Nice Body"	
2014	July 26, 2014	Show! Music Core	"Nice Body"	
2014	July 31, 2014	M Countdown	"Fake It"	
2014	August 6, 2014	Show Champion	"Nice Body"	
2014	August 15, 2014	Simply K-Pop	"Fake It"	
2014	August 16, 2014	Show Champion	"Fake It"	
2014	August 16, 2014	Show! Music Core	"Nice Body"	
2014	August 18, 2014	Music Bank	"Gold"	
2015	May 22, 2015	Music Bank	"I'm Good"	
2016	March 17, 2016	M Countdown	"Sketch"; "Gold"	
2016	March 18, 2016	Music Bank	"Sketch"	
2016	March 19, 2016	Show! Music Core	"Sketch"	
2016	March 20, 2016	Inkigayo	"Sketch"	
2016	March 25, 2016	Music Bank	"Sketch"	
2016	March 26, 2016	Show! Music Core	"Sketch"	
2016	March 27, 2016	Inkigayo	"Sketch"	
2016	April 1, 2016	Music Bank	"Sketch"	
2016	April 9, 2016	Show! Music Core	"Sketch"	
2017	June 15, 2017	M Countdown	"Ooh La La"	
2018	July 10, 2018	King of masked singer	"Love Sick"	
2018	July 17, 2018	King of masked singer	"I Love You"	
2018	September 14, 2018	Music Bank	"Mango"	
2018	September 16, 2018	Inkigayo	"Mango"	
2018	September 18, 2018	The Show	"Mango"	
2018	September 19, 2018	Show Champion	"Mango"	
2018	September 20, 2018	M Countdown	"Mango"	
2018	September 21, 2018	Yoo Hee-yeol's Sketchbook	"Mango"; "Friday"	
2018	September 21, 2018	Music Bank	"Mango"	
2018	September 22, 2018	Show Champion	"Mango"	
2018	September 23, 2018	Inkigayo	"Mango"	
2018	September 25, 2018	The Show	"Mango"	
2019	February 21, 2019	M Countdown	"Allure"	
2019	February 22, 2019	Music Bank	"Allure"	
2019	February 26, 2019	The Show	"Allure"	
2019	February 28, 2019	M Countdown	"Allure"	
2019	March 1, 2019	Music Bank	"Allure"	
2019	March 2, 2019	Show! Music Core	"Allure"	
2019	March 3, 2019	Inkigayo	"Allure"	
2019	March 5, 2019	Show Champion	"Allure"	
2019	March 5, 2019	The Show	"Allure"	
2019	March 8, 2019	Simply K-Pop	"Allure"	
2019	March 9, 2019	Show! Music Core	"Allure"	
2019	March 15, 2019	Simply K-Pop	"Allure (Jazz Ver.)"	
2021	September 1, 2021	The Playlist	"Through The Night"; "The Late Regret"	
2021	September 8, 2021	The Playlist	"Waiting"	
2021	September 16, 2021	Gomak Mate	"Lonely"; "Childish Adult"	

== Radio shows ==
Year	Date	Show	Songs performed	Ref
2009	August 25, 2009	Yoon Gun's Dreamy Radio	"Baby Bye Bye" (Note: Yoon Mi-rae cover)	
2011	January 4, 2011	KBS Radio	"I Miss You"	
2019	March 3, 2019	Idol Radio	"U Um U Um"; "Allure"; "Mango"; "Bo Peep Bo peep"	
