= Hyomin discography =

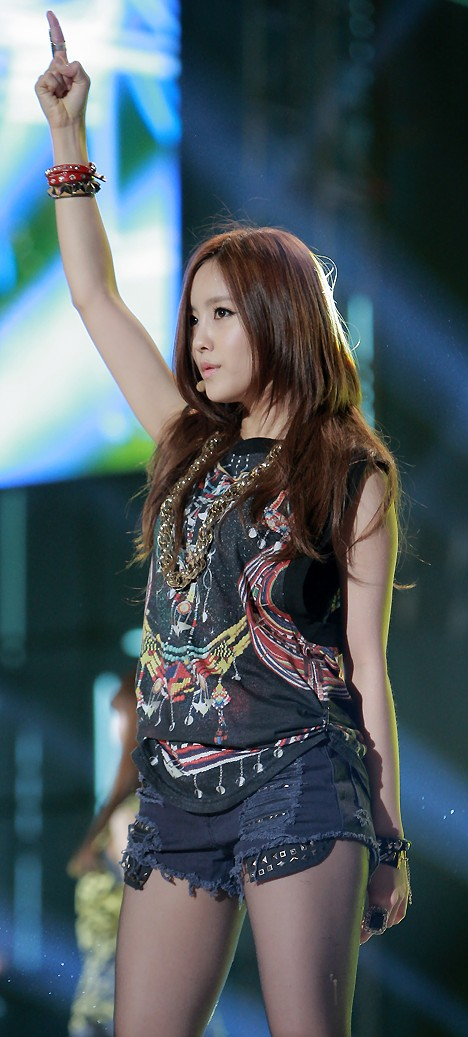
- Hyomin at K-Collection in Seoul in March 2012
- EPs: 3
- Singles: 6
- Promotional singles: 2
- Guest appearances: 2
- Soundtrack appearances: 2
- Compilation appearances: 7
- Music videos: 13

South Korean singer and rapper Hyomin has released three extended plays and eight singles, including two promotional singles.

In 2008, Hyomin appeared as a guest rapper on "Blue Moon" by Davichi and Seeya, becoming the first member of T-ara to participate in a pre-debut release. She later officially debuted as a member of the group. Prior to her solo debut, Hyomin participated in several singles and soundtrack projects, most notably "Wonder Woman", a collaboration between T-ara, (Note: Only Hyomin and Eunjung participated to represent the group.) Davichi, and Seeya. The single peaked at number six on the newly established Gaon Chart and sold over 2.3 million digital copies by the end of 2010, becoming one of the best-selling singles in South Korea that year. In 2011, she released "Beautiful Girl", a collaboration with Brave Brothers and Electroboyz. The single peaked at number twenty-three on the Gaon Digital Chart and received recognition at the Annual Home Shopping Awards.

Hyomin made her official solo debut in 2014 with Make Up. The EP peaked at number six on the Gaon Album Chart and received nominations for the Main Prize at the Seoul Music Awards and Artist of the Year at the YinYueTai Awards. Its lead single, "Nice Body", peaked at number thirteen on the Gaon Digital Chart and number eighteen on the Billboard Korea Hot 100. The song later won the Best Sexy Award at the MTV Best of the Best Awards, while Hyomin received the Best Female Artist award at the KU Awards.

In 2016, Hyomin released her second extended play, Sketch, which peaked at number three on the Gaon Album Chart. The release earned her the Best Female Artist award and a second Artist of the Year nomination at the YinYueTai Awards. Its lead single, "Sketch", became the first song by a Korean solo artist to top Billboard China Top 100. It charted eight weeks at peak.

In 2018, Hyomin collaborated with JustaTee on "Cabinet", a promotional single created to promote tourism in South Korea. The song topped V Heartbeat's chart in Vietnam for four consecutive months and received four awards at the V Live Awards.

In 2019, Hyomin released her third extended play, Allure, which peaked at number eleven on the Gaon Album Chart. All three singles from the EP topped YinYueTai's singles chart, while "Mango" and "U Um U Um" peaked at numbers five and four, respectively, on Billboard China Top 100.

== Extended plays ==
Title	Album details	Peak positions	Sales
Title	Album details	KOR	Sales
Make Up	Released: June 30, 2014; Label: Core Contents Media; Format: CD, digital download, streaming	6	KOR: 8,868
Sketch	Released: March 17, 2016; Label: MBK Entertainment; Format: CD, digital download, streaming	3	KOR: 13,000
Allure	Released: February 20, 2019; Label: Sublime Artist Agency; Format: CD, digital download, streaming	11	KOR: 10,237
"—" denotes releases that did not chart or were not released in that region.

== Singles ==
Title	Year	Peak chart positions				Sales	Album
Title	Year	KOR	KOR Hot	CHN V	CHN YYT	Sales	Album
"Wonder Woman" (with Eunjung, Seeya and Davichi)	2010	6	—	—	—	KOR: 2,300,000	Non-album single
"Nice Body"	2014	13	18	—	—	KOR: 229,290	Make Up
"Sketch"	2016	120	—	1	1	KOR: 13,515	Sketch
"Mango"	2018	— (Note: "Mango" did not chart on Gaon's Digital chart but it peaked at number 51 on the social chart.)	—	5	1		Allure
"U Um U Um"	2019	— (Note: "U Um U Um" did not chart on Gaon's Digital chart, but it peaked at number 4 on the social chart and at number 97 on the BGM chart.)	—	4	1		Allure
"Allure"	2019	— (Note: "Allure" did not chart on Gaon's Digital chart, but it peaked at number 2 on the Social Chart and at number 93 on the Bell Chart.)	—	—	1 (Note: "Allure" peaked at first on the Korean chart for 8 weeks in a row)		Allure

=== Promotional singles ===
Title	Year	Peak chart positions	Sales	Album
Title	Year	KOR	Sales	Album
"Beautiful Girl" (with Brave Brothers and Electroboyz)	2011	23	KOR: 113,000	Non-album single
"Cabinet" (with JustaTee)	2019	—		Non-album single
"—" denotes recordings which were not released in that country or didn't chart.

== Guest appearances ==
Title	Year	Album
"Blue Moon" (SeeYa, Davichi and Black Pearl feat. Hyomin & Eunjung)	2008	Non-album single
"N-Time" (Hwang Jung-eum feat. Hyomin & Eunjung)	2009	Non-album single

== Soundtrack appearances ==
Song	Year	Peak chart positions	Sales	Album
Song	Year	KOR	Sales	Album
"Coffee Over Milk" (with Jiyeon and Lee Bo-ram)	2010	74	KOR: 526,000	Coffee House OST Part 3
"Empty Space"	2021	— (Note: "Empty Space" did not chart on Gaon's Digital Chart, but it peaked at number 43 on the BGM chart.)		Summer Guys OST Part 3
"—" denotes recordings which were not released in that country or didn't chart.

== Compilation appearances ==
Song	Year	Album
"Not Everyone Can Love" (Note: Live, Tae Jin Ah cover) (With Eunjung)	2013	Immortal Song: Singing a Legend
"Faraway Home" (Note: Live, Na Hoon-a cover) (With Eunjung)	2014	Immortal Song: Singing a Legend (Lunar New Year Special)
"Still Have You" (Note: Live, YB cover) (With Eunjung)	2014	Music Trip Yesterday (College Song Festival)
"Vision"	2017	Mix And The City
"Just One More" (prod by CashCash) (with Jessi, DJ H.ONE, Tritops, Jimin and Xie)	2017	Mix And The City
"I Love You" (Note: Live, Shin Hyo-Bum cover)	2018	King of Mask Singer
"Late Regret" (Note: Live, Jo Hyun-ah cover)	2021	The Playlist

== Other appearances ==
Song	Year	Artist	Album
"Dangerous" (with Eunjung & Jiyeon)	2013	T-ara	"Bunny Style"
"Love Suggestion"	2013	T-ara	"Bunny Style"
"Ooh La La"	2017	T-ara	What's My Name?

== Songwriting credits ==
All song credits are adapted from the Korea Music Copyright Association's database unless otherwise noted.

Year	Album	Song	Lyrics		Music	
Year	Album	Song	Credited	With	Credited	With
2014	Make Up	"Overcome"	Yes	—N/a	Yes	Konquest
2016	Sketch	"Only We Are Aware Of Our Story"	Yes	With Alex Kang	Yes	Mokujins
2016	Sketch	"Still"	No	Yeong Jun-hyung	Yes	—N/a

== Music videos ==
Song	Year	Album
"Wonder Woman"	2010	Non-album single
"Beautiful Girl"	2011	Non-album single
"Nice Body"	2014	Make Up (EP)
"Nice Body" (Dance Ver.)	2014	Make Up (EP)
"Sketch"	2016	Sketch (EP)
"Sketch" (19 Ver.)	2016	Sketch (EP)
"MANGO"	2018	Allure (EP)
"MANGO" (Chinese Ver.)	2018	Allure (EP)
Cabinet	2018	Allure (EP)
"U Um U Um"	2019	Allure (EP)
"U Um U Um" (Chinese Ver.)	2019	Allure (EP)
"Allure"	2019	Allure (EP)
"Allure" (Chinese Ver.)	2019	Allure (EP)

== See also ==
- T-ara discography
