= Kim Jin-seong (actor) =

South Korean actor (born 2001)

- Born: May 8, 2001 (age 24); South Korea
- Occupation: Actor
- Years active: 2003–present

Korean name
- Hangul: 김진성
- RR: Gim Jinseong
- MR: Kim Chinsŏng

Kim Jin-seong (born May 8, 2001) is a South Korean actor.

== Filmography ==
=== Television series ===
Year	Title	Role	Network
2003	Age of Warriors	Madage (later Emperor Zhangzong)	KBS1
2008	The Great King, Sejong	young Zhengtong Emperor	KBS1
2008	Love and Marriage	young Park Hyun-soo	KBS2
2008	Don't Cry My Love	Joon	MBC
2009	The City Hall	Cho-rang	SBS
2009	Three Brothers	Kim Hyun-soo	KBS2
2010	Marry Me, Mary!	young Jung In	KBS2
2011	KBS Drama Special "That Man Is There"	young Choi Joon-yong	KBS2
2011	Original Fairytale Watching on TV "Kid Carrying Bag"	Young-taek	EBS
2011	My Love By My Side	young Lee So-ryong	SBS
2011	Gyebaek	Buyeo Tae	MBC
2012	Take Care of Us, Captain	young Kim Yoon-sung	SBS
2012	Moon Embracing the Sun	child Yangmyeong	MBC
2012	Dream of the Emperor	young Kim Beob-min	KBS1
2012	Dr. Jin	Jin Soon-young	MBC
2013	Happy Noodle	young Ho-jin	Zhejiang TV
2013	Hur Jun, The Original Story	Prince Shinseong	MBC
2014	Empress Ki	Prince Maha	MBC
2014	Family Secret	Go Eun-ho	tvN
2015	In Still Green Days	young Lee Young-hoon	KBS2
2015	Make a Woman Cry	Hwang Jung-hoon	MBC
2017	Stranger	young Kim Jung-bon	tvN
2017	Prison Playbook	young Yoo Han-yang	tvN
2018	Prison Playbook	young Yoo Han-yang	tvN
2018	The Miracle We Met	Im Ho-tak	KBS2
2018	Mr. Sunshine	Hak Do-byung	tvN
2018	Heart Surgeons	Jin-woo	SBS
2019	Special Labor Inspector	Gu Min-jae	MBC
2020	Team Bulldog: Off-Duty Investigation	Jo Myung-soo	OCN
2022	The King of Tears, Lee Bang-won	Lee Bang-seok (Note: also known as Grand Prince Ui-an, the second son of King Taejo and Queen Sindeok)	KBS1

=== Film ===
Year	Title	Role
2010	Hello Ghost	Jung-won
2011	Ghastly	Gi-jin
