= T-ara N4 =

South Korean girl group

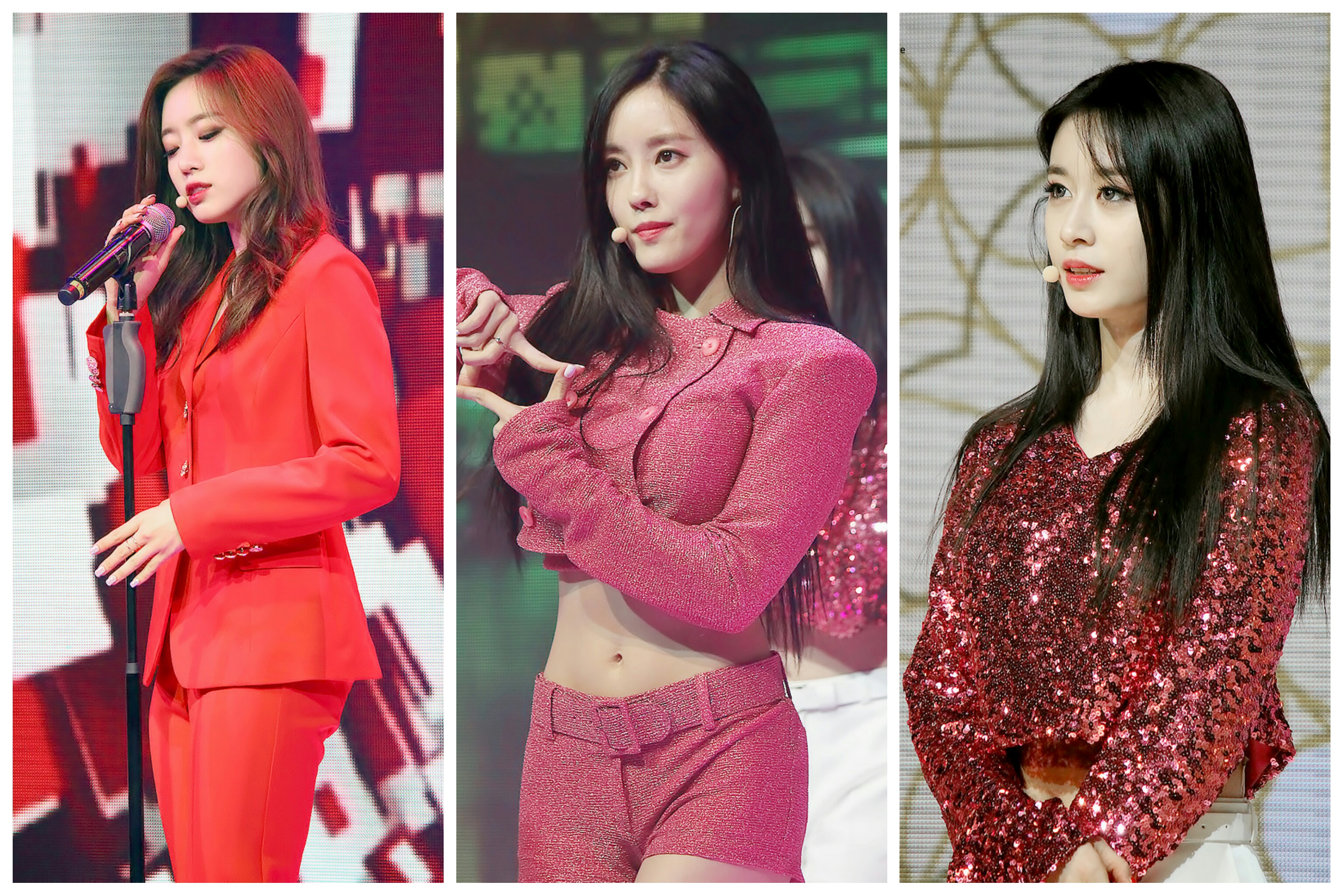

Background information
- Origin: Seoul, South Korea
- Genre: K-pop
- Years active: 2013
- Label: MBK
- Spinoff of: T-ara
- Past members: Eunjung; Hyomin; Jiyeon; Areum
- Website: T-ara N4

T-ara N4 (Korean: 티아라 엔포) was the first official sub-group of South Korean girl group T-ara, composed of Eunjung, Hyomin, Jiyeon and previously Areum until her departure from the main group in July 2013. The sub-group only released one EP, Jeon Won Diary in April 2013.

== History ==
In late March 2013, T-ara's agency Core Contents Media were in the midst of forming a new unit from the group with the members Eunjung, Areum, Jiyeon and Hyomin. The unit's name, T-ara N4 (which stands for "T-ara Brand New 4") was revealed April 12, 2013. T-ara previously tried sub-units with the promotions of their sixth Japanese single "Bunny Style!", in which the B-sides were sung by units of two and three members; however it would be their first time official unit activities.

T-ara N4's debut single, "Jeon Won Diary" (전원일기; Jeon-won Ilgi), was inspired by the 1980s South Korean drama of the same name. Produced by Duble Sidekick, the song is said to have "funky and intense" dance music combined with elements of hip-hop, with the main motif of "Jeon Won Diary" about breaking away from the same everyday routine. T-ara made their first visit to the United States on May 12, 2013 to meet with several musicians and music industry insiders along with Chris Brown who discovered the group recently, liked its songs and style and suggested a collaboration single. About 300 fans gathered at the airport to welcome the group while 5 limousines and 18 security guards, reportedly, escorted the group to the hotel. The group was supposed to debut in the U.S and have features with the singer, however, due to unexplained reasons, the debut never happened.

On July 10, 2013, Areum left the group to pursue her solo career. Core Contents Media announced that Dani would occupy Areum's positions only in the T-ara N4 sub-unit, while in May 2012 Dani was originally revealed to join T-ara as the ninth member following the completion of her training. As of October 2014, their agency decided that Dani would not be part of T-ara N4 and continue as a trainee under the agency instead.

== Discography ==
=== Extended plays ===
- Jeon Won Diary (2013)

=== Charts and sales ===
Year	Title	Peak positions		Digital Sales
Year	Title	KOR Gaon	KOR Billboard	Digital Sales
2013	"Jeon Won Diary"	11	15	KOR: 590,000
2013	"Can We Love"	—	—	KOR: 68,000
"—" denotes releases that did not chart or were not released in that region.

== Awards and nominations ==
Ceremony	Year	Category	Nominee	Result	Ref.
Synnara Awards	2013	Best Album	Jeon Won Diary	Nominated	
MTV Best of The Best Awards	2013	Best Sub-unit	T-ara N4	Nominated	
SBS Pop Asia Awards	2013	Best Newcomer	T-ara N4	Won	
Inkigayo Awards	2013	Best Popular Song	Jeon Won Diary	Nominated	
