= Sheep (Lay song) =

- Alan Walker Relift cover

Single by Lay

from the album Lay 02 Sheep
- Released: October 7, 2017
- Recorded: 2017
- Studio: Zhang Yixing Studio, China
- Genre: C-pop; trap
- Length: 3:25
- Label: SM
- Songwriters: Dom. T; Lay
- Producers: Lay; Devine Channel

Lay singles chronology
"I Need U" (2017)	"Sheep" (2017)	"Goodbye Christmas" (2017)

Music video
- "Sheep" on YouTube

"Sheep" (Chinese: 羊) is a single recorded by Chinese singer Lay for his solo album Lay 02 Sheep. The song was released on October 7, 2017 by SM Entertainment. Lay and Norwegian DJ Alan Walker released a remix on August 31, 2018.

== Music video ==
A teaser for the music video was released on October 6, 2017 by SM Entertainment. The music video was released on October 7, Lay's birthday.

== Live performance ==
Lay performed "Sheep" for the first time during the album premiere held at the Beijing National Aquatics Center on October 12, 2017. He subsequently performed the song at the reality talent show, The Next Season 2.

Lay performed a remix of "Sheep" at Lollapalooza alongside Alan Walker on August 3, 2018 in Chicago, Illinois, making it his first American appearance in the United States.

== Charts ==
Chart (2017)	Peak position
Chinese Singles (Billboard V Chart)	1
Chinese Singles (QQ Music)	1

== Awards ==
Year	Award	Category	Work	Result	Ref.
2017	Billboard Radio China	Top 10 Chinese Songs of the Year	Sheep	Won	

== Release history ==
Region	Date	Format	Label
South Korea	October 7, 2017	Digital download	S.M. Entertainment
Worldwide	October 7, 2017	Digital download	S.M. Entertainment
South Korea	August 31, 2018	Remix	S.M. Entertainment
