= Lee Hyung-suk =

South Korean actor

Lee Hyung-Suk
- Born: September 9, 2000 (age 26); Cheongju, South Korea
- Occupation: Actor
- Years active: 2007–2018

Korean name
- Hangul: 이형석
- RR: I Hyeongseok
- MR: I Hyŏngsŏk

Lee Hyung-Suk (born September 9, 2000) is a South Korean actor. He began his career as a child actor.

== Filmography ==
=== Television series ===
Year	Title	Role	Network
2008	Lawyers of the Great Republic of Korea	Oh Gook	MBC
2009	Romance Zero		MBC Dramanet
2009	Life is Good	Goo Uh-Jin	MBC
2010	Dong Yi	Lee Geum / Prince Yeoning	MBC
2010	More Charming by the Day	young street kid (ep.3)	MBC
2012	Dr. Jin	Gojong (young)	MBC
2013	The Eldest	Jong-Bok (young)	JTBC
2015	Webtoon Hero Toondra Show	Kim Kwang-Min	MBC Every 1

=== Films ===
Year	Title	Role
2008	Mother and Daughters	spectator's child
2011	Mama	Won-Jae
2011	Ghastly	Bin
2011	Perfect Game	Chul-Goo
2012	Speckles: The Tarbosaurus	young Speckles (voice)

== Musical theatre ==
Year	Title	Role
2006	Miss Saigon	Tam
2008	Brave Brothers	Big Grandpa
2009	Brave Brothers	Yoo-rim
2009	The Wizard of Oz	
2010	Mozart!	Young Amadeus Mozart
2010	The Snowman	
2013	Les Misérables	Gavroche

== Awards and nominations ==
Year	Award	Category	Nominated work	Result
2009	28th MBC Drama Awards	Best Young Actor	Life is Good	Won
2010	29th MBC Drama Awards	Best Young Actor	Dong Yi	Won
