= I Need U (Lay song) =

Single by Lay

from the album Lay 02 Sheep
- Released: September 25, 2017
- Recorded: 2017
- Studio: Zhang Yixing studio
- Genre: C-pop; R&B
- Length: 3:39
- Label: S.M. Entertainment
- Songwriters: Zhou Wei Jie, Lay
- Producers: Lay, Devine Channel

Lay singles chronology
"Lose Control" (2016)	"I Need U" (2017)	"Sheep" (2017)

"I Need U" (Chinese: 需要你) is a single recorded by Chinese singer Lay (Zhang Yixing) for his solo album Lay 02 Sheep, which was released on October 7, 2017. The song was pre-released on September 25, 2017, by S.M. Entertainment and dedicated to Lay's grandparents' 50th wedding anniversary.

== Background and release ==
"I Need U" is described as an urban R&B pop genre song where Lay participated in its composing and lyrics-writing. The song is dedicated to Lay's grandparents' 50th wedding anniversary with lyrics confessing eternity to the beloved.

In a letter on S.M. Entertainment's social media account which was posted one day before the release of the music video, Lay talked about his grandparents' love and how they care for one another. He also described his relationship with them and how he hoped to give them a touching memory through "I Need U". He stated, "Love can sometimes be like a habit, but also refreshing and touching like a scene in a movie, a single book, or a song. But I believe that love, from what I have felt, is being able to do even the smallest of things for your loved one thousands, if not tens of thousands, of times."

Lay revealed in a video hosted by Chaumet that this song was in fact written beforehand together with "what U need?" as a response to the latter and expressed that a song is the best fit as an answer to the suspense posed by another song.

== Music video ==
The music video begins with a piano version of Gymnopédie No.3 by Erik Satie and the phrase "Ce n'est pas une histoire d'amour. C'est une histoire qui parle d'amour". It tells the story of a young man, portrayed by Lay himself, strolling through Paris while planning to ask his beloved to marry him. After many years, the two return to Paris to reminisce the past.

The music video, featuring Lay's grandparents, was filmed in Paris, France and personally planned and directed by Lay himself.

== Reception ==
The accompanying music video for "I Need U" ranked #1 on Billboard's China Weibo Live Chart. In 12 hours, "I Need U" hit more than 26 million views online, consecutively being the major 3 music chart's winner. Additionally, the music video was charted in 17 countries and ranked #1 on iTunes in 12 countries, including the United States, Canada, Malaysia, Portugal, Philippines, Singapore, Thailand, Turkey, Hong Kong, China and more.

== Charts ==
Chart (2017)	Peak position
Chinese Singles (Billboard)	3
Chinese Singles (QQ Music)	91
