= List of Billboard China V Chart top 10 albums of 2017 =

The following is a list of the best-selling albums of 2017 on the Billboard China V Chart. The chart ranks in two different categories, mainland albums and imported albums using data from Chinese video-sharing site YinYueTai (YYT).

== Criteria ==
=== Chart entry criteria ===
There is no time limit imposed for (domestic) albums released within mainland China. For the album still sells on the Yin Yue Shopping Mall, the album is eligible to be ranked in the weekly album chart. The classification of albums into mainland and foreign albums depend on the country/location the album was released and not the language.

==== Structure ====
The chart cycle for real time chart is updated hourly while the weekly and yearly album charts are updated every month and year respectively.

The real time chart shows only ranking without the number of sales.

The weekly chart shows only the top50 ranking albums in the month and the number of sales for only the top5 albums.

The yearly chart shows only the top50 ranking albums in the year and its number of sales. The chart will be published at the subsequent year on 1 January.

==== Loop holes ====
1. Pre-order sales for a specific album will only be counted on the release date.
1. If a single album is divided into multiple editions, the sales will be counted separately.

== Top 10 albums of 2017 ==
Mainland (Domestic)				Imported			
Rank	Album	Artist(s)	Reference	Rank	Album	Artist(s)	Reference
1	Lay 02 Sheep	Zhang Yixing (Lay)		1	1X1=1(TO BE ONE)	WANNA ONE	
2	The Crossing	Joker Xue		2	Lose Control (Note: Album released outside of China although it is a Chinese language album by a Chinese artist; album released in 2016)	Zhang Yixing (Lay)	
3	December (W Edition) (Note: Album released in 2016)	Wang Qing		3	Flight Log: Arrival	GOT7	
4	December (Q Edition)	Wang Qing		4	You Will Never Walk Alone	BTS	
5	Reloaded (Note: The only album released in 2015)	Luhan		5	VOL.3 [EX’ACT] (KR VER.)	EXO	
6	New World	SWIN-S		6	My Voice (Vol. 1)	Taeyeon	
7	Transform	Owodog		7	THE WAR Vol.4 (KR VER.)	EXO	
8	N/A	N/A		8	NCT #127 Cherry Bomb	NCT	
9	N/A	N/A		9	THE WAR Vol.4 (CHN VER.)	EXO	
10	I. Feminism	Ivy		10	Flight Long Turbulence (Note: Album released in 2016)	GOT7	

== Annual sales percentage ==
=== Mainland (Domestic) albums ===
Rank	Album	Artist	Percentage of mainland albums
1	Lay 02 Sheep	Zhang Yixing (Lay)	70.39%
2	The Crossing	Joker Xue	17.19%
3	December (W Edition)	Wang Qing	4.07%
4	December (Q Edition)	Wang Qing	4.0%
5	Reloaded	Luhan	1.88%

=== Imported albums ===
Rank	Album	Artist	Percentage of imported albums
1	1X1=1(TO BE ONE)	WANNA ONE	13.29%
2	Lose Control	Zhang Yixing (Lay)	12.14%
3	Flight Log: Arrival	GOT7	7.81%
4	You Will Never Walk Alone	BTS	5.69%
5	VOL.3 [EX’ACT] (KR VER.)	EXO	4.52%
