= Lay 02 Sheep =

- Digital cover

Studio album by Lay Zhang
- Released: October 7, 2017
- Recorded: 2017
- Studios: Doobdoob (Seoul); In Grid (Seoul); SM Big Shot (Seoul); Zhang Yixing Studio, China
- Genres: Mandopop; Hip hop; R&B; EDM
- Length: 32:09
- Languages: Mandarin Chinese; English
- Labels: SM; Genie
- Producer: Lay Zhang

Lay Zhang chronology
Lose Control (2016)	Lay 02 Sheep (2017)	Winter Special Gift (2017)

Singles from Sheep
- 1. "I Need U" Released: September 25, 2017; 2. "Sheep" Released: October 7, 2017

Lay 02 Sheep is the first studio album by Chinese singer Lay Zhang. It was released on October 7, 2017 in South Korea and China by SM Entertainment. The album features ten tracks in total, including the two singles "I Need U" and "Sheep".

== Background and release ==
On September 21, Lay and S.M. Entertainment released teaser images for the album on different social media platforms. On September 25, the single "I Need U" was released as Lay's gift to his grandparents' on their 50th wedding anniversary.

On September 27, it was confirmed by S.M. Entertainment that Lay will be releasing his second album Lay 02 Sheep on October 7, 2017. Lay was a producer and personally executed the composition, arrangement and lyrics writing of all the songs as well as the directing of the music videos. On October 6, 2017 S.M. Entertainment released a teaser for the music video of "Sheep". Lay 02 Sheep was officially released on October 7 (Lay's birthday) through online stores.

== Singles ==
The music video for "I Need U" ranked #1 on Billboard's China Weibo Live Chart. In 12 hours, it hit more than 26 million views online, consecutively being the major 3 music chart's winner. "I Need U" charted in 17 countries and ranked #1 on iTunes in 12 countries, including the United States, Canada, Malaysia, Portugal, Philippines, Singapore, Thailand, Turkey, Hong Kong, China and more.

== Promotion ==
On October 7, Lay performed a flash mob of "Sheep" in Sanlitun, Beijing. The album premiere, "2017 Zhang Yixing Showcase" was held at the Beijing National Aquatics Center on October 12. On October 21, Lay kickstarted the first stop of his "Lay 02 Sheep Signing Promo" at Hongqiao Art Centre, Shanghai. The second wing of his "Lay 02 Sheep Signing Promo" continued at Shenzhen on October 29. On November 5, the "Lay 02 Sheep Signing Promo" was wrapped up at Changsha, Hunan. He subsequently performed the song at the reality talent show, The Next Season 2 on Dragon TV which he guested. On December 31, Lay performed "Sheep", "Boss" and "Mask" on Hunan TV's Year End Concert.

== Commercial performance ==
On its first day of digital sales, the album broke 5 records on QQ Music: Gold (¥250,000 in 30 seconds), Double Gold (¥500,000 in 45 seconds), Triple Gold (¥750,000 in 52 seconds), Platinum (¥1 million in 1 minute 10 seconds) and Diamond Record (¥5 million in 9 hours 11 minutes). The album later broke a Double Diamond (¥70 million) record on May 3, 2018.

The album entered iTunes Worldwide at #9, being the first Chinese singer to enter iTunes Worldwide Top 10 Albums list. Within 2 hours, the album ranked #1 on iTunes in 10 countries including Japan, Australia, Singapore, Indonesia, Philippines and more. Billboard China ranked the lead song, "Sheep" at #2 on the Top 10 Chinese Songs of 2017.

== Track listing ==
No.	Title	Lyrics	Music	Arrangement	Length
1.	"Sheep (羊)"	Dom.T; Lay	Lay; Devine Channel; JDODD	Lay; Devine Channel	3:25
2.	"I Need U (需要你)"	Zhou Wei Jie; Lay	Lay; Devine Channel	Lay; Devine Channel	3:39
3.	"Peach (桃)"	Devine Channel; J Skillz; JDODD	Lay; Devine Channel; J Skillz; JDODD	Lay; Devine Channel	3:26
4.	"Hand (匕首)"	Liu Yuan; Lay	Lay; Julien Maurice Moore; MZMC	Lay	3:23
5.	"Boss (老大)"	Maxx Song; Jenesis	Lay; Command Freaks	Lay; Command Freaks	2:59
6.	"Shake (摇摆)"	Dom.T; Lay	Lay; Devine Channel	Lay	3:07
7.	"Too Much (太多)"	Dom.T; Lay	Lay; Devine Channel	Lay	3:02
8.	"Mask (面罩)"	Dom.T; Lay	Lay; Julien Maurice Moore; MZMC; Andrew Bazzi	Lay	3:06
9.	"Director (导演)"	Lay	Lay; Devine Channel; TONY; Casper	Devine Channel; Lay	3:25
10.	"X Back (兴迷)"	Wang YaJun; Lay	The Stereotypes; Lay	The Stereotypes; Lay	3:22
Total length:					32:59

== Charts ==
=== Weekly charts ===
Chart (2017)	Peak position
Chinese Albums (YinYueTai)	1
Japanese Albums (Oricon)	87
South Korean Albums (Gaon)	10
US World Albums (Billboard)	4

=== Year-end charts ===
Chart (2017)	Peak position
Chinese Albums (YinYueTai)	1
Chinese Albums (Billboard)	2

== Sales ==
Region	Sales
China (DL)	811,103+
Japan (Oricon)	757+
South Korea (Gaon)	21,214+

== Release history ==
Region	Date	Format	Label	Producer
South Korea	October 7, 2017	Digital download, streaming audio	S.M. Entertainment	Lay Zhang
China	October 7, 2017	Digital download, streaming audio	S.M. Entertainment	Lay Zhang
Various	October 7, 2017	Digital download, streaming audio	S.M. Entertainment	Lay Zhang
South Korea	October 18, 2017	CD, Digital download, streaming audio	S.M. Entertainment	Lay Zhang
China	October 18, 2017	CD, Digital download, streaming audio	S.M. Entertainment	Lay Zhang

== Awards ==
Year	Award	Category	Result
2017	Tencent Video Star Awards	Album of the Year	Won
2018	25th ERC Chinese Top Ten Awards	Album of the Year	Won
2018	25th ERC Chinese Top Ten Awards	Producer of the Year	Won
