= List of Billboard China V Chart number-one albums of 2017 =

The following is a list of the number-one albums of 2017 on the weekly Billboard China V Chart.

== Criteria ==
=== Chart entry criteria ===
There is no time limit imposed for (domestic) albums released within mainland China. For the album still sells on the Yin Yue Shopping Mall, the album is eligible to be ranked in the weekly album chart. The classification of albums into mainland and foreign albums depend on the country/location the album was released and not the language.

==== Structure ====
The chart cycle for real time chart is updated hourly and the weekly and yearly album charts are updated every month and year respectively.

The real time chart shows only ranking without the number of sales.

The weekly chart shows only the top50 ranking albums in the month and the number of sales for only the top5 albums.

The yearly chart shows only the top50 ranking albums in the year and its number of sales. The chart is published for the subsequent year on 1 January.

==== Loop holes ====
1. Pre-order sales for a specific album will only be counted on the release date.
2. If a single album is divided into multiple editions, the sales will be counted separately.

== Chart history ==
Mainland (Domestic)				Imported			
Issue date	Album	Artist(s)	Reference	Issue date	Album	Artist(s)	Reference
12.26-01.01	December (W Edition)	Wang Qing		12.26-01.01	Lose Control	Zhang Yixing (Lay)	
01.02-01.08	December (W Edition)	Wang Qing		01.02-01.08	Lose Control	Zhang Yixing (Lay)	
01.09-01.15	Reloaded	Luhan		01.09-01.15	Lose Control	Zhang Yixing (Lay)	
01.16-01.22	December (Q Edition)	Wang Qing		01.16-01.22	Lose Control	Zhang Yixing (Lay)	
01.23-01.29	December (W Edition)	Wang Qing		01.23-01.29	Lose Control	Zhang Yixing (Lay)	
01.30-02.05	December (W Edition)	Wang Qing		01.30-02.05	Lose Control	Zhang Yixing (Lay)	
02.06-02.12	December (W Edition)	Wang Qing		02.06-02.12	Lose Control	Zhang Yixing (Lay)	
02.13-02.19	December (W Edition)	Wang Qing		02.13-02.19	You Never Walk Alone	BTS	
02.20-02.26	Reloaded	Luhan		02.20-02.26	Lose Control	Zhang Yixing	
02.27-03.05	December (W Edition)	Wang Qing		02.27-03.05	My Voice	Taeyeon	
03.06-03.12	New World	SWIN-S		03.06-03.12	My Voice	Taeyeon	
03.13-03.19	New World	SWIN-S		03.13-03.19	Flight Log: Arrival	GOT7	
03.20-03.26	Reloaded	Luhan		03.20-03.26	7°CN	CNBLUE	
03.27-04.02	December (Q Edition)	Wang Qing		03.27-04.02	7°CN	CNBLUE	
04.03-04.09	Reloaded	Luhan		04.03-04.09	My Voice	Taeyeon	
04.10-04.16	Reloaded	Luhan		04.10-04.16	Lose Control	Zhang Yixing	
04.17-04.23	Reloaded	Luhan		04.17-04.23	Lose Control	Zhang Yixing	
04.24-04.30	Reloaded	Luhan		04.24-04.30	Palette	IU	
05.01-05.07	Reloaded	Luhan		05.01-05.07	Lose Control	Zhang Yixing	
05.08-05.14	Reloaded	Luhan		05.08-05.14	Lose Control	Zhang Yixing	
05.15-05.21	Reloaded	Luhan		05.15-05.21	Shangri-La	VIXX	
05.22-05.28	New World	SWIN-S		05.22-05.28	Flight Log: Arrival	GOT7	
05.29-06.04	Reloaded	Luhan		05.29-06.04	Flight Log: Arrival	GOT7	
06.05-06.11	Reloaded	Luhan		06.05-06.11	Flight Log: Arrival	GOT7	
06.12-06.18	Reloaded	Luhan		06.12-06.18	What's My Name?	T-ARA	
06.19-06.25	Reloaded	Luhan		06.19-06.25	Kwon Ji Young	G-DRAGON	
06.26-07.02	Reloaded	Luhan		06.26-07.02	NCT #127 Cherry Bomb	NCT	
07.03-07.09	Reloaded	Luhan		07.03-07.09	VOL.3 [EX’ACT]	EXO	
07.10-07.16	Reloaded	Luhan		07.10-07.16	BLACK Vol. 6	Lee Hyori	
07.17-07.23	Reloaded	Luhan		07.17-07.23	THE WAR VOL.4	EXO	
07.24-07.30	Reloaded	Luhan		07.24-07.30	THE WAR VOL.4	EXO	
07.31-08.06	Reloaded	Luhan		07.31-08.06	VERSE 2	JJ Project	
08.07-08.13	Reloaded	Luhan		08.07-08.13	1X1=1(TO BE ONE)	WANNA ONE	
08.14-08.20	N/A	N/A		08.14-08.20	1X1=1(TO BE ONE)	WANNA ONE	
08.21-08.27	Reloaded	Luhan		08.21-08.27	1X1=1(TO BE ONE)	WANNA ONE	
08.28-09.03	Reloaded	Luhan		08.28-09.03	1X1=1(TO BE ONE)	WANNA ONE	
09.04-09.10	Reloaded	Luhan		09.04-09.10	VOL.4 Repakage [THE WAR: THE POWER OF MUSIC]	EXO	
09.11-09.17	Reloaded	Luhan		09.11-09.17	1X1=1(TO BE ONE)	WANNA ONE	
09.18-09.24	Reloaded	Luhan		09.18-09.24	1X1=1(TO BE ONE)	WANNA ONE	
09.25-10.01	I.Feminism	Ivy		09.25-10.01	1X1=1(TO BE ONE)	WANNA ONE	
10.02-10.08	Reloaded	Luhan		10.02-10.08	1X1=1(TO BE ONE)	WANNA ONE	
10.09-10.15	Lay 02 Sheep	Zhang Yixing (Lay)		10.09-10.15	7 for 7	GOT7	
10.16-10.22	Lay 02 Sheep	Zhang Yixing (Lay)		10.16-10.22	1X1=1(TO BE ONE)	WANNA ONE	
10.23-10.29	Lay 02 Sheep	Zhang Yixing (Lay)		10.23-10.29	《CELEBRATE》	Highlight	
10.30-11.05	Lay 02 Sheep	Zhang Yixing (Lay)		10.30-11.05	Twicetagram	Twice	
11.06-11.12	Reloaded	Luhan		11.06-11.12	Play	Super Junior	
11.13-11.19	Lay 02 Sheep	Zhang Yixing (Lay)		11.13-11.19	Nothing Without You	WANNA ONE	
11.20-11.26	Lay 02 Sheep	Zhang Yixing (Lay)		11.20-11.26	Perfect Velvet	Red Velvet	
11.27-12.03	Transform	Owodog		11.27-12.03	Play	Super Junior	
12.04-12.10	Reloaded	Luhan		12.04-12.10	7 for 7	GOT7	
12.11-12.17	Lay 02 Sheep	Zhang Yixing (Lay)		12.11-12.17	Play	Super Junior	
12.18-12.24	The Crossing	Joker Xue		12.18-12.24	She Is	Kim Jong-hyun	
12.25-12.31	The Crossing	Joker Xue		12.25-12.31	VOL.3 [EX’ACT]	EXO	
