= Ghastly (film) =

- Ghastly poster
- 기생령
- Directed by: Ko Seok-jin
- Screenplay by: Kim Yura
- Produced by: Yang Yun-ho; Kim Yong-dae; Ki No-young; Cho Young-wook
- Starring: Han Eun-jung; Park Hyo-min; Lee Hyung-suk
- Cinematography: Baek Dong-Hyun
- Edited by: Kim Jihyun
- Production companies: East Sky Film; Core Content Media
- Distributed by: Lotte Cultureworks
- Release date: August 4, 2011
- Running time: 92 minutes
- Country: South Korea
- Language: Korean
- Box office: $681,403 (South Korea)

Ghastly (Korean: 고死: 기생령) is a 2011 Korean horror movie starring Han Eun-jung, Park Hyo-min and Lee Hyung-suk. The film tells the story of Seo-Ni (Han Eun-jung) who raises her orphan nephew Bin (Lee Hyung-suk). Seo-Ni then becomes involved in a horrifying mystery and discovers a shocking secret about her family. This is singer Hyomin's big screen debut and Ko Seok-jin's directorial debut. The movie featured cameos from singers T-ara, Hahm Eun-jung, and No Min-woo. The movie hit the theatres on August 4, 2011. The film became Asia's first horror/thriller movie released in 3D with 3D specialist company KDC Information & Communication.

== Synopsis ==
To take care of her nephew, her husband Jang Hwan (Park Seong-min), Sunny (Han Eun-jung) moves into Bin's (Lee Hyung-suk) house with her younger sister Yu-rin (Hyo-min). Sunny feels a little unexplained anxiety about Bin, who sometimes behaves strangely. Getting more and more tired of the nightmares, Sunny suspects that there's something wrong with the house and Bin's increasingly violent behavior.

== Development and production ==
The director of the movie was revealed to be Ko Seok-jin, who previously worked on movies; Rainbow Eyes, Phantom: The Submarine, and Natural City among others. Auditions for child characters "Bin" and "Yoo-Ri" (Seo-Ni's younger sister) took place between January 11 and the 14th. Filming began on May 21, 2011. The movie was revealed to be Asia's first horror/thriller movie released in 3D with 3D specialist company KDC Information & Communication. Posters were released on July 11, 2011.

== Casting ==
Auditions for child characters "Bin" and "Yoo-Ri" (Seo-Ni's younger sister) took place between January 11 and 14. Singer and actress Hahm Eun-jung was cast for a special appearance along with girl group T-ara who attended the movie's press conference and had a special stage greeting. The final line-up list was released on August 4, 2011.

- Han Eun-jung as Seo-Ni
- Lee Hyung-suk as Bin
- Park Hyo-min as Yu-rin
- Park Seong-min as Jang Hwan
- Baek Soo-ryeon as Gwi-ok
- Kim Jin-seong as Gi-jin
- Hwang Ji-hyeon as Kahi
- Jang Seon-ho as Jang Yeon
- Park Min-soo as Chang-gi
- Heo Jeong-beom as Seong-wook
- Seol Joo-young as Bin's Homeroom teacher
- Jeon Byeong-cheol as Class leader
- Park Hye-jin as Jang Yeon-mo
- T-ara
- No Min-woo as Cheol-woong (special appearance)
- Hahm Eun-jung (special appearance)

== Release ==
The movie's release was delayed by 48 hours, in a phone call with Movist, East Sky Films PR claimed production stopped because of a strange loud noise that continued for about 10 minutes. The company later asked for understanding from customers who reserved the movie by phone. Consequently, the movie's stage greeting and press conference were both postponed as well. A press conference was held on August 24. It was attended by the movie's cast and crew as well as guest celebrities including girl group T-ara. .Ghastly premiered on August 4, 2011.

=== Home media ===
South Korean distributor Candle Media manufactured and distributed Ghastly DVD version on October 27, 2011. A Mandarin version was released in Taiwan on 18 June 2013 followed by a Japanese one on December 20, 2013. Another version was released in Thailand on August 31, 2015 . The movie's digital version is only 77 minutes. Rights for the film were acquiered by several South Korean streaming platforms including TVING, Watcha, Waave.

== Original Soundtracks ==
=== Composition and reception ===
The original soundtrack album consists of 21 tracks, though, only two were sung by singers; the title track, "Heaven", performed by Davichi, and "Until The End", performed by Lee Boram of Seeya and So-yeon of T-ara. "Heaven" is a pop ballad. The latter is a work by composer Cho Young-soo, who has previously worked with both groups.. It is a medium-tempo song with an acoustic piano.

The OST album was released on 8 August 2011 by Stone Music Entertainment. It peaked at number sixty-three on the weekly Gaon Chart (Circle chart). The lead single (by Davichi), peaked at number nineteen on the weekly Gaon Digital chart and charted for 4 weeks. By the end of 2011, the song made it to the yearly sales chart with a total of 642,598 pure downloads.

=== Tracklist ===
Original Album Tracklist
No.	Title	Lyrics	Music	Artist	Length
1.	"Heaven" (드림하이)	June	Seokju Lee, Song Dae-gi	Davichi	3:16
2.	"Until The End" (끝까지)	Taeyeon Won	Jo Young-soo	T-ara, Seeya	3:06
3.	"Prelude"		Choi Mansak	Choi Mansak	2:11
4.	"Strange House"		Choi Mansak	Choi Mansak	1:14
5.	"Suspicion"		Choi Mansak	Choi Mansak	1:27
6.	"Bad Dream 1"		Choi Mansak	Choi Mansak	0:33
7.	"Bad Dream 2"		Choi Mansak	Choi Mansak	4:19
8.	"Bad Dream 3"		Choi Mansak	Choi Mansak	1:25
9.	"Bad Dream 4"		Choi Mansak	Choi Mansak	0:51
10.	"Bad Dream 5"		Choi Mansak	Choi Mansak	1:27
11.	"Chang Geun's death"		Choi Mansak	Choi Mansak	1:19
12.	"Hide-and-Seek"		Choi Mansak	Choi Mansak	1:26
13.	"Ghost Shelter"		Choi Mansak	Choi Mansak	0:52
14.	"Grandmother's testimony"		Choi Mansak	Choi Mansak	2:28
15.	"Grandmother's Death"		Choi Mansak	Choi Mansak	1:17
16.	"Shrine 1"		Choi Mansak	Choi Mansak	0:48
17.	"Shrine 2"		Choi Mansak	Choi Mansak	0:47
18.	"Shrine 3"		Choi Mansak	Choi Mansak	0:53
19.	"Events That Come To Light"		Choi Mansak	Choi Mansak	3:54
20.	"Requiem of Ghastly"		Choi Mansak	Choi Mansak	6:02
Total length:					41:00

=== Chart performance ===
Title	Year	KOR	Sales	Ref.
"Heaven"	2011	19	KOR: 642,598	

== Reception ==
=== Box office ===
The movie grossed approximately $681,403 in South Korea with a total audience of 97,000 across 207 screens.

=== Critical reception ===
Ghastly received mixed reviews from critics who commented on the poor plot but praised the main actors' performance, specifically, Han Eun-jung who later received a popularity award at the 33rd Golden Cinematography Awards. Writing for Movist, reporter Yoo Da-yeon describes the movie as quite scary and fun, he also noted its attempt to create a story suited to Korean beliefs such as shamans. However, he criticized its weak story structure and typical horror movie scenes as well as filming techniques. The movie was rated 6/10. In a slightly more positive review, C.J. Wheeler of HanCinema describes it as darker and bloodier than other horror movies released that year, notably White and The Cat. He goes on to praise the "captivating" opening scene and the original, "slightly religious" premise. Similarly to other reviews, he notes that the rest of the movie doesn't live up to the hype created by the opening scenes. Kim Cheol-yeon of Korea Film Archive, also notes that the film failed to properly capture the changing appearance of parasitism and the fear that arises from murder.

Following its DVD release in Japan in 2013, the film was selected by Japanese movie theatre Cinemart Roppongi (Tokyo) for their annual "Korean Movie Selection" and was screened in the said cinema along with Dangerously Excited and Secret Love starting from Septembre 3rd and in Cinemart Shinsaibashi (Osaka) October 5.

=== Awards & Nominations ===
Year	Award ceremony	Recipient	Award	Result	Ref.
2011	33rd Golden Cinematography Awards	Han Eun-jung	Most Popular Actress	Won	

== See also ==
Korean horror
