= Jeon Won Diary =

EP by T-ara N4
- Released: April 29, 2013
- Genres: K-pop; dance-pop
- Label: Core Contents Media
- Producer: Duble Sidekick

Singles from Jeon Won Diary
- 1. "Jeon Won Diary" Released: April 29, 2013

Jeon Won Diary (Korean: 전원일기; RR: Jeon Won Ilgi, also translated as "Countryside Life", "Countryside Diaries" or "Rural Life") is the debut extended play (EP) by South Korean girl group T-ara N4, a sub-unit of T-ara. It was released on April 29, 2013, and was promoted by the lead single of the same name. The song was written and produced by Duble Sidekick, with additional arrangement by Hwang Ho-jin. It features a guest verse from Speed's rapper, Woo Tae-woon. Musically, "Jeon Won Diary" is a dance-pop song with elements of hip-hop, while the lyrics are about wanting to escape from the day-to-day routine.

== Background and composition ==
In late March 2013, T-ara's agency Core Contents Media were in the midst of forming a new unit from the group with the members Eunjung, Areum, Jiyeon and Hyomin. The group previously tried sub-units with the release of their sixth Japanese single "Bunny Style!", in which the B-sides were sung by units of two and three members; however, this was their first time doing formal unit activities.

The title track, "Jeon Won Diary", was inspired by the 1980s South Korean drama of the same name. Produced by Duble Sidekick, the song is said to have "funky and intense" dance music combined with elements of hip-hop, with the main motif of "Jeon Won Diary" being about breaking away from the same everyday routine. Another version of the song, with traditional harmonies and instruments, was arranged by Hwang Ho-jun. The choreography was done by Jo Soo Hyun, known for his popular works Psy's "Gangnam Style" and "Gentleman".

== Music video ==
=== Background and synopsis ===
The music video for "Jeon Won Diary", directed by Jo Soo-hyun, was filmed over a period of three days and four nights. Jo, who is known for directing Psy's "Gangnam Style" and "Gentleman", previously worked with T-ara on their "Bunny Style!" music video. The dance version of the music video was directed by Hong Won-ki. A teaser for the video was shown at the 2013 M! Countdown in Taiwan concert, while the full music video premiered on YouTube, GomTV and other online music sites on April 29, 2013. The video features cameo appearances from singer Kim Wan-sun, politician Huh Kyung-young, actor Jung Woon-taek, retired baseball player Yang Joon-hyuk, Davichi's Kang Min-kyung and Speed (aside from Tae-woon's rap verse, the other Speed members can be seen dancing alongside T-ara N4 in the end of the video). Choi Bool-am and Kim Soo-mi, both actors from the Jeon Won Ilgi TV drama, came together for the first time in eleven years to appear in the video.

The drama version depicts the group as tired farmhands who are bored of farm life. As their supervisor gets distracted, the members play hooky and decide to join a dance competition held in the city. The group members practice their dance routine throughout the farm, before heading out to the city where they win the competition.

=== Critical reception ===
Grace Danbi Hong of enewsWorld rated the music video three and a half stars out of five, praising the video for its mix of "old and new" while commenting that international audiences won't be able to get the references.

== Track listing ==
No.	Title	Lyrics	Music	Length
1.	"Jeon Won Diary" (전원일기; Jeon Won Ilgi) (Feat. Duble Sidekick, Taewoon)	Duble Sidekick	Duble Sidekick, Hwang Ho-jun	3:50
2.	"Can We Love" (Feat. Duble Sidekick)	Duble Sidekick	Duble Sidekick	3:51
3.	"Jeon Won Diary (Electronic)" (Feat. Duble Sidekick, Taewoon)	Duble Sidekick	Duble Sidekick	3:50
4.	"Jeon Won Diary (MR ver.)"		Duble Sidekick	3:50
5.	"Can We Love (Instrumental)"		Duble Sidekick	3:51
Total length:				19:14

== Charts ==
Chart (2013)	Peak position
Korea Gaon weekly albums	3
Japan Oricon weekly albums	24

=== Reported sales ===
Chart	Amount
Gaon physical sales	28,360
Oricon physical sales	4,771

== Awards and nominations ==
Ceremony	Year	Category	Nominee	Result	Ref.
Synnara Awards	2013	Best Album	Jeon Won Diary	Nominated	
MTV Best of The Best Awards	2013	best Sub-unit	T-ara N4	Nominated	
SBS Pop Asia Awards	2013	Best Newcomer	T-ara N4	Won	
Inkigayo Awards	2013	Best Popular Song	Jeon Won Diary	Nominated	

== Release history ==
Country	Date	Format	Label
South Korea	April 29, 2013	CD, digital download	Core Contents Media, LOEN Entertainment

== Credits and personnel ==
- Park Hyomin – vocals, rap
- Ham Eunjung – vocals
- Park Jiyeon – vocals
- Lee Areum – vocals
- Woo Jiseok – rap
- Duble Sidekick – producing, songwriting, arranger, music
- Hwang Ho-jun - music
