= Hyomin =

South Korean singer and actress (born 1989)

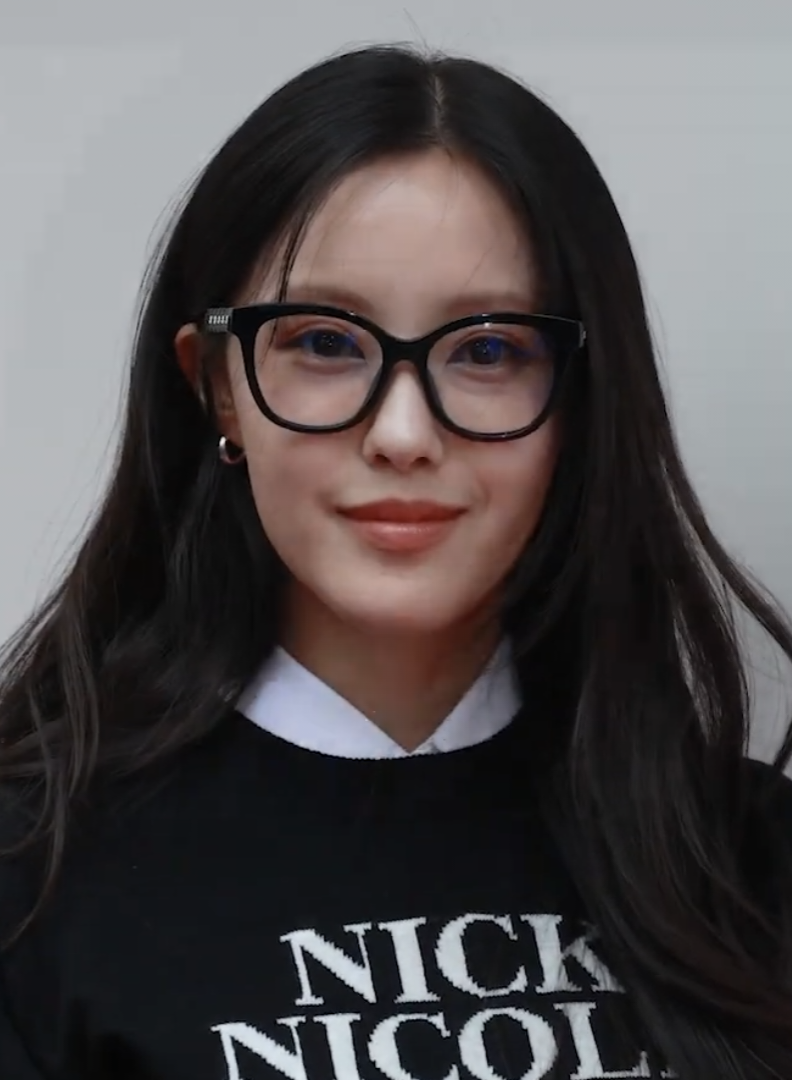
- Hyomin in October 2024
- Born: Park Sun-young; May 30, 1989 (age 37); Busan, South Korea
- Other name: Christina
- Education: Sungkyunkwan University (Bachelor of Fine Arts in Acting)
- Occupations: Singer; Songwriter; Businesswoman; Creative Director; Fashion Designer; Actress
- Agent: Andmarq
- Height: 167 cm (5 ft 6 in)
- Spouse: Unknown (m. 2025)
- Musical career
- Genre: K-pop
- Instrument: Vocals
- Years active: 2009–present
- Member of: T-ara; T-ara N4

Korean name
- Hangul: 박선영
- RR: Bak Seonyeong
- MR: Pak Sŏnyŏng

Stage name
- Hangul: 효민
- RR: Hyomin
- MR: Hyomin

Signature
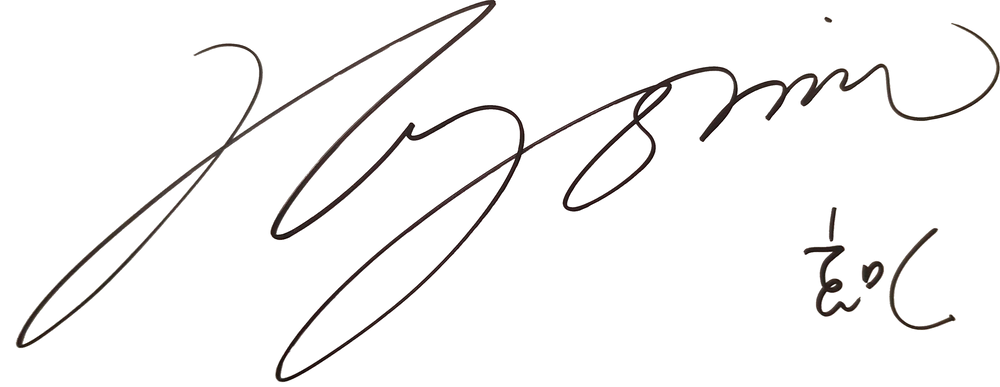

Park Sun-young (Korean: 박선영; born May 30, 1989), known professionally as Hyomin (효민), is a South Korean singer, actress, businesswoman, and creative director, known for her work as a member of South Korean girl group T-ara. Apart from her group's activities, Hyomin has also starred in various television dramas such as My Girlfriend is a Nine-Tailed Fox, and Gyebaek, and in various films such as Ghastly and Jinx!!!.

She debuted as a solo artist with her debut mini-album, Make Up, on June 30, 2014, with the lead track "Nice Body" which earned her three nominations at the Seoul Music Awards. Since then, she has released two EPs: Sketch (2016) and Allure (2019). In 2019, Hyomin released the digital single "Cabinet", which topped Vietnam's V Heartbeat monthly chart for four consecutive months.

Hyomin is known for her direct involvement with project-making, including songwriting, production, styling and design. KBS referred to her as "one of the leading fashionistas in girl groups" in 2016. Since 2011, Hyomin has put out several personalized items and has established her own brands including, make-up brand MINITT, clothing line "Say No More", liquor brand HyominSour, and most recently contact lens brand EYETIST, all of which received commercial and critical success.

== Early life and education ==
Hyomin was born Park Sun-young on May 30, 1989, in Busan, South Korea, an only child. In 1997, she won the MiMi Princess modeling contest, and became a well-known internet ulzzang before debuting with T-ara. She was a trainee under JYP Entertainment and was considered to be a replacement for Hyuna, who was a member of the Wonder Girls in 2007. She got accepted into Sungkyunkwan University in 2008, prior to her debut, and graduated with a Bachelor's degree of Fine Arts in Acting in 2011.

Hyomin is Catholic and her baptismal name is Christina.

== Career ==
=== 2009–2011: Career beginnings ===
Hyomin debuted in 2009 as a member of T-ara, which made their debut stage on July 30 on the music program M Countdown with their single "Lie".On June 14, 2011, Core Contents Media announced that Hyomin would take over leadership as T-ara's third leader for their comeback album, John Travolta Wannabe, and Japanese promotions. The leader is responsible for the group's dynamic as well as determining its artistic direction by meeting composers and stylists and participating directly in album concepts and styling. She later passed on her leadership to fellow member, Park So-yeon.

Hyomin was a regular cast member of KBS' variety show Invincible Youth from October 23, 2009, to December 24, 2010. The show received positive reviews both fans and critics, earning several accolades, including an appreciation plaque from the Korean Ministry for Food, Agriculture, Forestry and Fisheries, a President's commendation from Korea Rural Community Cooperation, and a special award at the 16th Hongcheon WaxyCorn King Festival. In November 2009, she was cast in the musical production of I Really Really Like You, an adaption of the popular drama Love Truly.

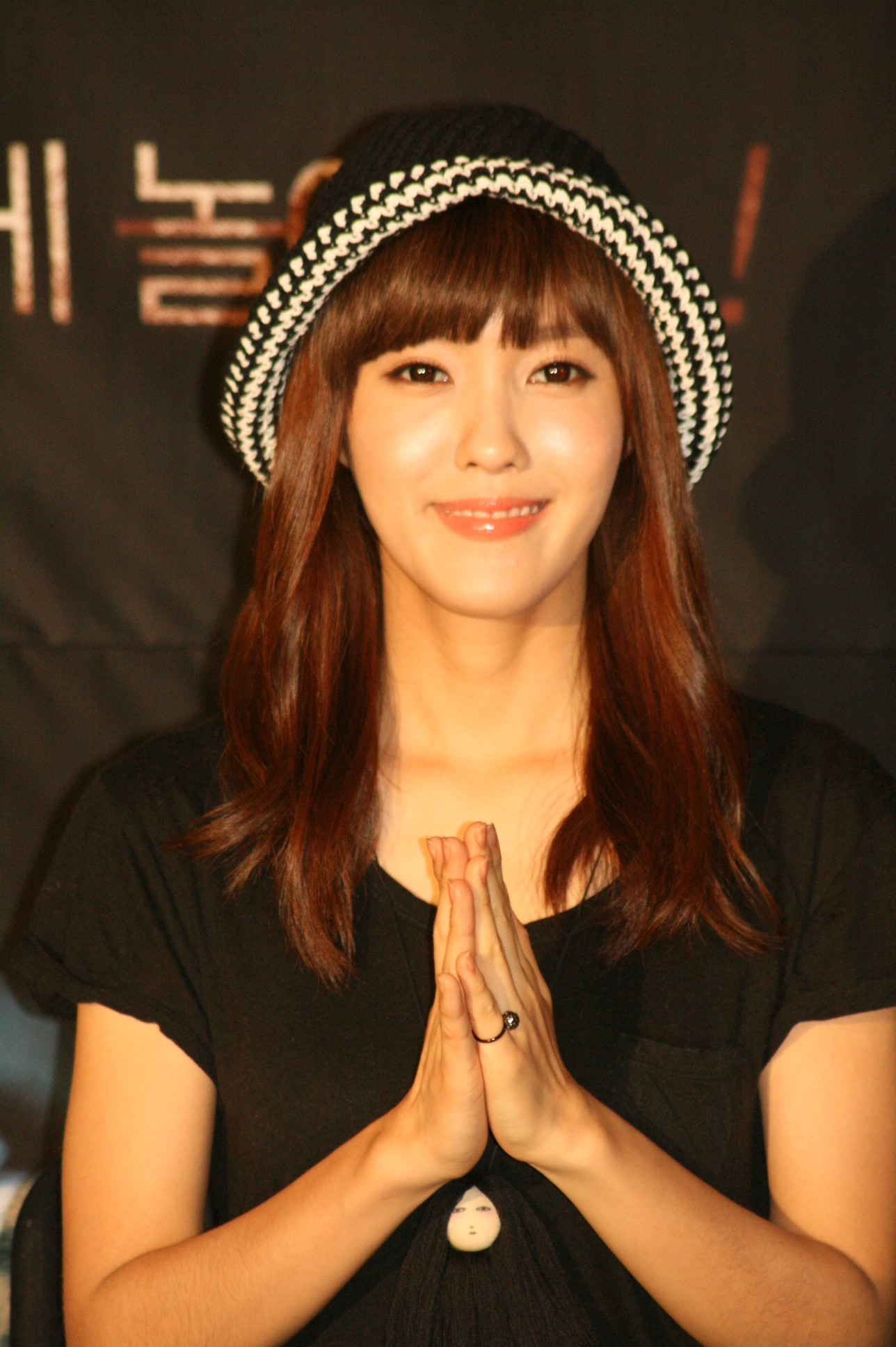
Hyomin at Ghastly film press conference in 2011

She starred in the drama My Girlfriend is a Nine-Tailed Fox as Ban Sun-nyeo, which aired from August 11 to September 30, 2010. The drama achieved nationwide and later international success, ranking among the Top 10 most-watched dramas during its run. Hyomin made her big-screen debut in the horror film Ghastly, released on August 4, 2011.

=== 2012–2013: Acting career and T-ara N4 ===
In 2012, Hyomin was cast in the musical "Our Youth Roly-Poly" along with group members Park Ji-yeon and Park So-yeon, a musical adaptation of T-ara's 2011 hit song "Roly Poly". Hyomin was also cast in the Chinese version of We Got Married, in which her partner is Fu Xinbo, a Chinese idol. On June 14, 2012, it was confirmed that Hyomin was cast in a supporting role in MBC's fantasy sitcom The Thousandth Man.

On February 10, 2013, Hyomin was cast in a lead role in the Japanese film Jinx!!!, starring Kento Yamazaki and Kurumi Shimizu. which earned a special nomination at Tokyo International Film Festival and marked Hyomin's first appearance at the said event. In April 2013, Hyomin along with T-ara member Hahm Eun-jung, Park Ji-yeon and former member Areum formed a subgroup called T-ara N4, releasing their first mini-album titled Jeon Won Diary.

=== 2014–present: Solo debut and label changes ===
On June 30, 2014, Hyomin released her first solo extended play Make Up, featuring the lead single "Nice Body". The song was hit in both in and outside Korea, peaking at number 1 on YinYueTai chart, the largest Chinese streaming platform. Her second extended play Sketch with the title track "Sketch" was released on March 17, 2016. The album earned Hyomin's first award at the YinYueTai V-Chart Awards for Best Female Artist.

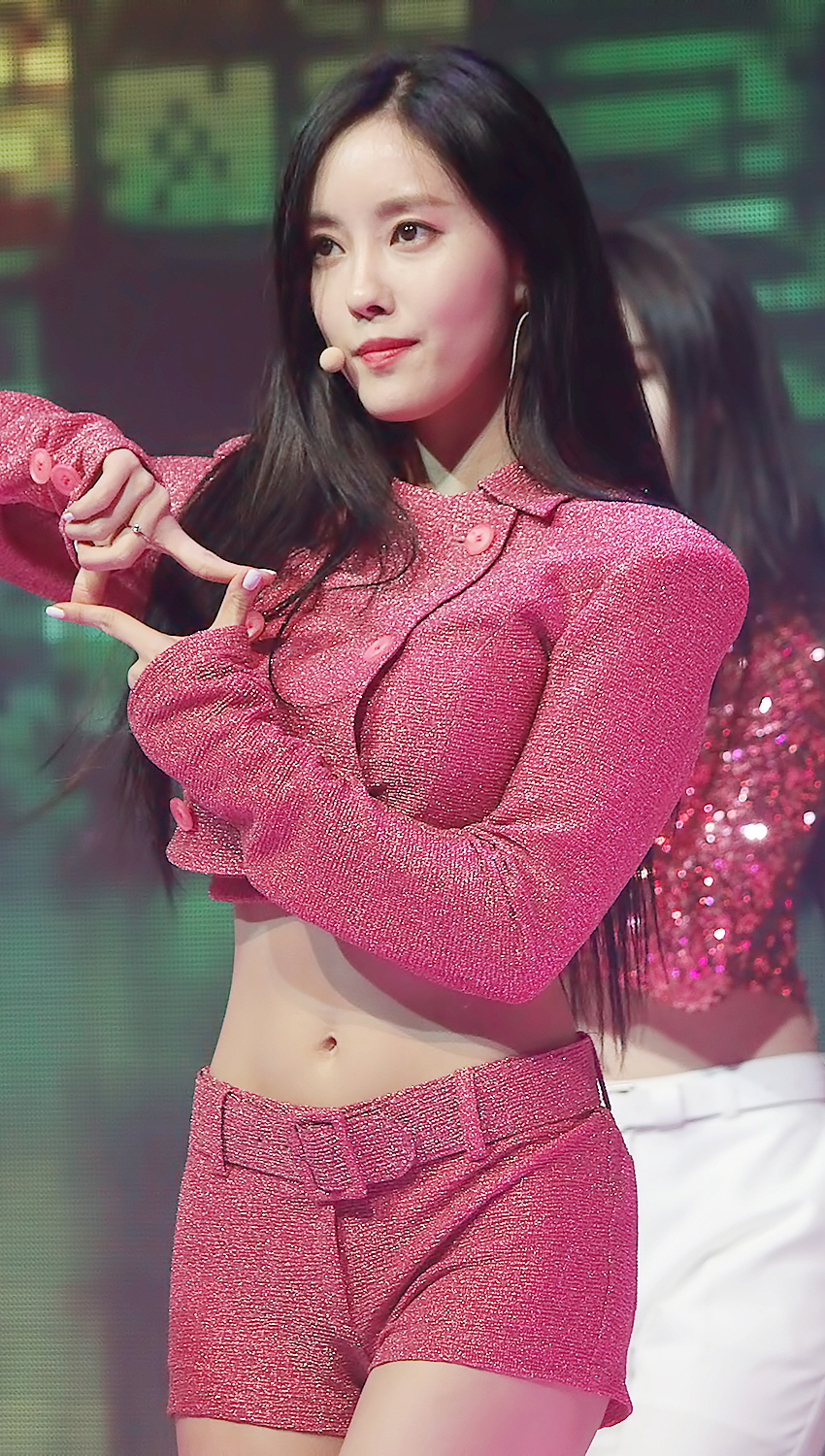
Hyomin performing at T-ara showcase in 2017

In January 2018, Hyomin left MBK Entertainment after her contract ended. She intends to continue promoting with T-ara in the future. In May 2018, Hyomin joined Sublime Artist Agency to pursue her solo career in South Korea and China.

On January 20, 2019, Hyomin released her second digital single, "U Um U Um" as a pre-release ahead of her third mini-album, which was scheduled for mid-February. On February 20, 2019, Hyomin released her third extended play, Allure, with title track of the same name. The album became Hyomin's second to surpass 10,000 physical copies sold on Gaon Chart and her first to Top the Taiwanese album chart. Additionally, the song "Allure" became her fifth Number-one hit on YinYueTai chart, setting a record for the most chart-toppers by any Korean female artist.

In May 2021, Hyomin left Sublime Artist Agency after her contract with them had expired. In June 2023, Hyomin signed with new agency Andmarq.

== Personal life ==
On February 11, 2025, Sports Kyunghyang announced that Hyomin will get married on April 6, 2025, to a non-celebrity who works in finance. The wedding was held in Seoul at Hotel Shilla. The couple married on April 6, 2025.

== Artistry ==
Much like her own group's career, Hyomin's discography is known for its versatility and creativity, with her experimental music and album concepts, while being directly involved in all aspects of production, from songwriting to costume design. Her debut single, "Nice Body", sparked discussions on societal beauty standards, with PopMatters praising the music video's commentary on the pressure placed on women and pop stars. She's known for conveying emotions through her singing as well as delivering a sharp performance for her more intense songs.

Hyomin is credited as the executive producer for her albums, contributing to the production of its costumes, hair styling, packaging, choreography, music video, design, and more. Described as the best K-pop female rapper by Vietnam's Women's Newspaper, her debut song as a songwriter garnered praise, particularly for its thoughtful lyrics. In 2018, her third EP was part of a "color project", starting with the release of the single "Mango" (Yellow), proceeded by "U Um U Um" (Emerald green), and concluding with "Allure" (Red), the latter became the lead single for the EP of the same name.

== Public image and impact ==
=== Fashion ===
In 2012, Kim Ji-il from The Korea Economic Daily praised Park's fashion sense in his article Rise of the New Fashion Icon, after one of her photos gained significant attention in South Korea. He highlighted her distinctive appearance, along with her airport fashion and stage outfits. Vietnamese magazine Kenh14 selected Hyomin as one of the top Korean celebrities with the best style in 2013 praising her simple airport outfits and recognizing her as one of the idols with the best fashion style.

"The Fashion Icon" and "South Korea's Fashionista", as E-Times and Chosun Ilbo described her, Park has been recognized by multiple local and international publications. In 2013, Asia Time editor Cho Seonghwa referred to her as "a certified fashionista. Since 2016, Cosmopolitan has frequently featured her, highlighting her fashion choices across different styles as a source of inspiration for readers.

Additionally, She has landed multiple covers and editorials of numerous prominent fashion magazines both in Korea and abroad, including for High Cut, Allure, Cosmopolitan , Vogue, Marie Claire , #Legend (Hong Kong), GQ, Shanghai Entertainment (China), Nylon, Harper's Bazaar, InStyle, Dazed and BNT International. Hyomin has been a regular VIP guest at the Seoul Fashion Week since 2012, modeling for otable brands like Beyond Closet, YCH, FleaMadonna and pushBUTTON.

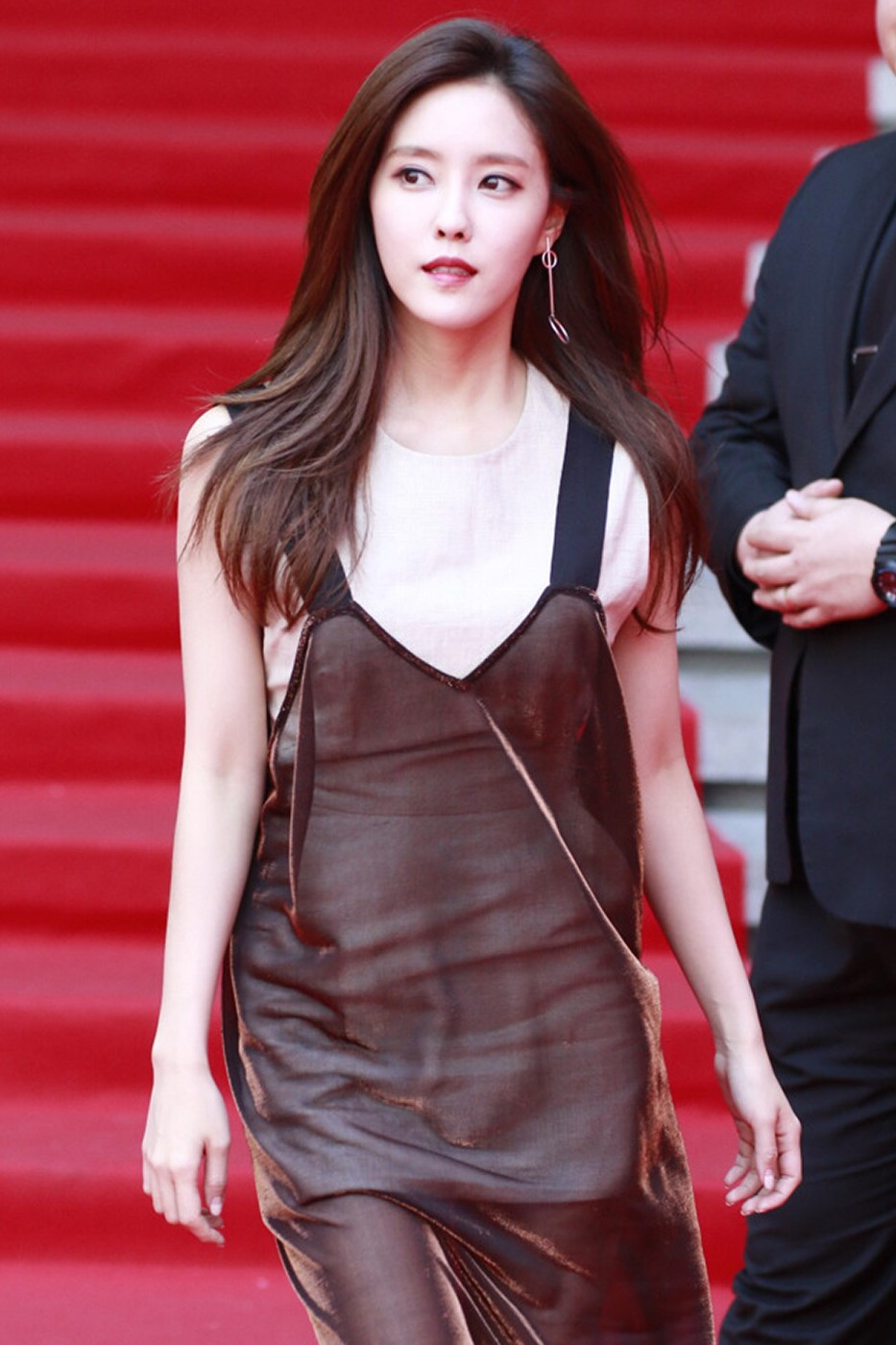
Hyomin attending Seoul Fashion Week in March 2016

Fashion experts frequently place her on "The Best Dressed" lists, particularly for casual wear. In January 2016, Allure Magazine praised her Seoul Fashion Week outfits for making trendy pieces wearable. Hailed as "20s Wannabe Star", she is recognized as an influence for women in their 20s, especially for "bold" choices of clothes.

Writing for E-Times, Hwang Yeong-cheol highlighted Hyomin's strong presence in the fashion industry, particularly after her appearances at various fashion events. In 2016, Hyomin received an invite to attend the menswear brand Beyond Closet's pop-up launching show held at PMQ Shopping Mall in Hong Kong. The event, which included about 50 celebrities from the beauty industry, saw Park as the only foreign celebrity invited. In May 2022, Hyomin's fashion style on her 1-month trip to Australia became a Cosmopolitan article in which she was described as "well-rounded". An editor of the magazine praised her trip looks, focusing especially on her casual outfits.

=== Cultural impact ===
Hyomin frequently topped the most visited and popular Cyworld pages, an old popular social platform at the time, since her debut with hundreds of thousands of weekly views. Over the years, Hyomin has been selected as a role model for several newer idols. In July 2018, (Former) IOI and Weki Meki member Yoojung revealed that she was inspired by Hyomin's "Nice Body" performance to become an idol as quickly as possible. In 2017, she was placed at 14th on Forbes China's Global Idol Chinese Popularity Ranking. In 2018, Hyomin's Weibo live broadcast of her birthday event Hyom's Restaurant recorded 5,6 Million live viewers and 3,33 million likes, taking the top spot among Korean female celebrities.

== Business endeavors ==
=== Creative direction ===
On June 14, 2011, Hyomin was appointed as T-ara's leader, under the group's rotational leadership system. Leaders in this system played a critical role in conceptualizing ideas, collaborating with composers, deciding on styling, and managing group activities and schedules while providing support for members' individual projects. During her tenure, she oversaw the promotion period for T-ara's John Travolta Wannabe and Roly Poly In Copacabana.

Earlier that year, she became the stylist and creative director for labelmate Gangkiz's debut, personally curating costumes for their debut song "Honey Honey". Hyomin also served as the group's assistant photographer for their high-profile debut project, valued at approximately ₩1 Billion (~$980,000), and narrating their reality show 9 Days 8 Nights in Europe.

In April 2013, Hyomin extended her creative contributions to T-ara's sub-unit, T-ara N4, where she took charge of styling for their debut single album Jeon Won Diary. She personally curated hip-hop-inspired stage costumes, incorporating baggy clothing with electronic elements and traditional South Korean themes.

In an interview with Dazed, she shared that she personally selects her outfits for airport appearances and public events. Additionally, she plays an active role in conceptualizing her pictorials and photoshoots, choosing the outfits and brands featured.

In 2023, Italian-Korean tote bag brand Toitt Bag selected Hyomin as their newest model, producer and stylist for the line's future seasonal line.

=== Fashion lines and collaborations ===
In 2011, Hyomin designed the retro-inspired stage costumes for "Roly-Poly", which featured patterns and styles reminiscent of the era, earning widespread praise. On June 4, 2012, Hyomin launched her exclusive clothing collection and solo shop on G-Market in collaboration with celebrity stylist Kim Sung-il. The collection featured around 150 products, including one-piece dresses, beachwear, shorts, and coordination sets.

In 2014, to celebrate her solo debut album Make Up, Hyomin designed a special collection of T-shirts sold exclusively on T-ara's mobile app, "T-ara Holic". The collection sold out in under 24 hours, with all profits donated to charity. She also designed a set of personalized wrist-bands which were sold on the same app. In 2018, Hyomin collaborated with South Korea's largest retailer, Shinsegae Emart. Promotional materials were released across South Korea and internationally, notably in Vietnam. The retailer also sponsored several of Hyomin’s activities, including her appearance on MBN's Cart Show 2 and her birthday event. In 2021, Hyomin designed a summer collection, in collaboration with Korean clothing brand LAZY CORNER, which included a set of dresses, tops and skirts.

In September 2021, Hyomin expanded her entrepreneurial ventures by launching her clothing line, "SAY NO MORE". The brand made its debut with a pop-up store in Seoul, South Korea, on March 19, 2022. The event was graced by numerous artists and celebrities, including, Jiyeon, Eun-jung, Qri, Woo-ri, Ji-sook, Yein, Yebin, Jane, Hwang Jae-gyun. Prominent industry professionals were also in attendance, such as, art director Ralph Joosong, AVAM's founder and designer Cho Chowon, Photomatic's CEO Hong Seung-hyun, Marie Claire Korea's Editor Lee Se-hee, Esquire Korea's Editor, Leha Studio's Creative Director Yoo Eana, DAZE DAYZ's founder and designer Yu Haeng, and Handsome Corp Fashion Director's Yun Hyun Ju, among others. Hyomin, as the designer behind the brand, showcased her creative direction and eye for fashion, further cementing her position as a multifaceted artist and entrepreneur.

=== Cosmetics and beauty ===
On February 25, 2019, Hyomin launched her exclusive cosmetic brand "MINITT" in collaboration with VT Cosmetics. She was deeply involved in the entire production process, from brand planning to product development. The brand name, a blend of "Min" from Hyomin and "Minute," symbolizes the idea of falling for MINITT's charm in an instant. Guided by her vision to inspire beauty, the brand's slogan was, "Through MINITT, you can feel Hyomin's makeup know-how, lifestyle, and inspiration." The makeup line featured a variety of products, including essence cushions, artistic eyeliners, perfumes, lip-tail pencils, and radiance ampoules.

On July 16, Hyomin announced the launch of her contact lens brand "EYETIST", in collaboration with WIGGLE WIGGLE. The name combines "EYE" and "ARTIST". Hyomin announced that she's the brand's creative director. She oversees every aspect including, branding, product planning, marketing, artist collaborations, and meetings with overseas buyers. She remains deeply involved in each detail from reviewing samples, testing lenses herself, and refining elements like color, print design, and logo size. She also conducts long-term wear tests to ensure the final products look consistent across different lighting conditions. Eyetist plans to expand into eye-focused skincare; creams, patches, coolers, as well as merchandise such as eye masks, lens cases, and keychains. On September 5, 2025, the brand revealed its simultaneous launch across South Korea, China, and Japan, beginning with the opening of its first pop-up store in Beijing on November 29, 2025, and followed by a second opening in Seoul on December 22, 2025. Optical Newspaper noted that Eyetist is the first Korean color-lens brand with direct artist participation at every stage.

=== Culinary ventures ===
In 2015, Hyomin hosted a cooking show titled Hyomin's Nice Cook Bang, which was broadcast live exclusively on V Live. In 2016, Hyomin appeared on the MBC Chuseok Special cooking program Idol King of Cooking. In 2018, Hyomin prepared and served meals to 100 fans in celebration of her birthday. The event was livestreamed on Weibo, in China, under the title Hyom’s Restaurant. Park is credited as the producer and host of the show. Park was credited as both the producer and host of the show. It proved to be a commercial success, ranking first on Weibo’s charts and generating more than 5.6 million viewers. In 2019, she earned a certification as a Japanese cuisine chef and expressed her aspirations to enter the food industry. Her culinary pursuits continued in 2021, when she participated in the JTBC cooking show Cooking: The Birth of a Cooking King advancing to the second round as a contestant. In 2026, she started taking classes in Korean food from Culinary Class Wars's start Chef Woo Jung-wook.

In December 2023, Hyomin officially launched her own alcoholic brand, HyominSour, in collaboration with Brewguru. The brand, developed entirely under Hyomin's direction, from the recipe, design and visual concept, was accompanied by a pre-launch event hosted by the singer on November 30. Hyomin also served as the brand's ambassador and led the promotional campaign, which included distribution plans for large supermarkets and major liquor stores. On April 5, 2024, HyominSour received the Grand Prize (Daesang) at the 2024 Korea Wine & Spirit Awards. The brand has since expanded with new flavors and announced its entry into the international market. The GS Retail Marketing team commended Hyomin's dedication to promotion and product development, revealing plans to create "Hyomin's Universe" through diverse promotional materials. By April 24, Brewguru announced that HyominSour has topped sales charts, surpassing one million units sold in South Korea within just four months of its launch, and five million units within two years.

== Other ventures ==
=== Ambassadorships ===
In 2011, Hyomin was chosen as Thailand's ambassador and judge for the one-billion idol audition program Global Super Idol. Hyomin attended the press conference for the program in Bangkok, Thailand on September 20, 2011. In 2019, Hyomin was selected as the public relations ambassador for South Korea's National Youth Day and received an ambassador's certificate for her role. She was chosen as an ambassador again the following year.

=== Endorsements ===
Hyomin modeled for various shopping malls and brands such as 7-Eleven before her debut. In 2017, Hyomin filmed a commercial for Adidas and also served as a Style runner for the brand. In 2018, Hyomin became a model for GGPX for which T-ara collaborated with in the past, she promoted the brand not only in Korea but also in Asia specifically in China due to her popularity in the region. In 2020, Hyomin became the global muse for Asian cosmetic brand Abib Global which was sold mainly in parts of South East Asia and China. Several commercial films were released for the promotion campaign. In 2022, she became French sportswear Le Coq Golf's muse. The same year, she advertised Australian wine brand Penfolds. In November, 2022, she attended to the brand's 'Venture Beyond by Penfolds' event held in Singapore. In 2023, Italian-South Korean bag brand Toitt Bag selected her their newest as the model, producer and stylist. In February, 2025 Hyomin became the face of Veganery. She later became a model for Spanish luxury fashion brand LOEWE, in March. In February 2026, Hyomin became the name face of Olivazumo.

In 2012, The Voice of The People Newspaper, reported that each of T-ara's member's individual advertising fee is around 400 million won, one of the highest in the industry.

=== Philanthropy and activism ===
Hyomin is an advocate for pet protection. In July 2016, she participated in the "Protect Us" campaign. Hosted by premium pet magazine Life & Douge and Thank You Studio, It aimed to revise the animal protection act in South Korea and prevent animal abuse.

In 2014, a self-designed collection of t-shirts made by Hyo-min was put on sale exclusive on T-ara's mobile app "T-ara Holic" to celebrate her solo debut. The entire collection was sold-out in less than 24 hours. Hyomin donated all profits to charities. In September 2014, Hyomin along with T-ara members donated 1,500Kg of rice "Dongducheon Angel" Movement. She personally delivered the donation to "Dongducheon Angel" Headquarters and held an additional fan-sign event to celebrate the Chuseok holiday with Boram and Qri.

In January 2017, Hyomin participated in "Give Love" campaign, a charity event organized by Save the Children Korea. Hyomin donated several personal products. The same year, she, along with her groupmate Qri participated in the "Donation Applause 337 Relay" campaign. Proceeds were donated to the community chest of South Korea, Green Umbrella Children's Foundation and the Children's Rehabilitation Establishment Fund. In 2019, Hyomin donated relief supplies for the victims of Gangwon-do wildfire disaster. In February 2020, Hyomin donated 3,000 masks to Daegu citizens during the spread of COVID-19. On March 8, 2022, Hyomin donated items to help the victims of the fire that started in Uljin, Gyeongbuk and has spread to Samcheok, Gangwon. Hyomin personally helped deliver the goods to charity organizations and people in need.

== Musical theater ==
Year	Title	Role	Notes	Dates	Venue	Ref.
2009–10	I Really Really Like You	Hong Jung-hwa	Main role	November 28, 2009 – March 1, 2010	Naru Arts Center	
2012	Our Youth, Roly Poly	Han Joo-young	Main role	January 13, 2012 – February 25, 2012	Seongnam Arts Center	

== Accolades ==
=== Awards and nominations ===
Award ceremony	Year	Category	Nominee / Work	Result	Ref.
Annual Home Shopping Awards	2011	Top 10 Songs	"Beautiful Girl"	Won	
China Powerstar Awards	2016	Most Influential Female Foreign Artist	Hyomin	Nominated	
China Powerstar Awards	2017	Most Influential Female Foreign Artist	Hyomin	Nominated	
China Powerstar Awards	2018	Most Influential Female Foreign Artist	Hyomin	Won	
China Powerstar Awards	2019	Most Influential Female Foreign Artist	Hyomin	Nominated	
Gaon Chart Music Awards	2010	Best Selling Ringtone	"Wonder Woman"	Won	
Gaon Chart Music Awards	2015	Weibo Star Award	Hyomin	Nominated	
Korea Wine & Spirit Awards	2024	Grand Prize (Daesang)	HYOMINSOUR	Won	
KU Awards	2014	Best Female Artist	Nice Body	Won	
MBC Drama Awards	2011	Best New Actress	Gyebaek	Won	
MIMI Model Contest	1997	Best Model	Hyomin	Won	
MTV Best of the Best Awards	2014	Best Sexy	Nice Body	Won	
Instyle Korea Awards	2016	Star Beauty Award	Hyomin	Nominated	
Instyle Korea Awards	2017	Star Beauty Award	Hyomin	Nominated	
Seoul Music Awards	2014	Bonsang Award (Main Prize)	Nice Body	Nominated	
Seoul Music Awards	2014	Hallyu Special Award	Nice Body	Nominated	
Seoul Music Awards	2014	Popularity Award	Nice Body	Nominated	
V Live Awards	2019	Song of The Month – August	"Cabinet"	Won	
V Live Awards	2019	Song of The Month – September	"Cabinet"	Won	
V Live Awards	2019	Song of The Month – October	"Cabinet"	Won	
V Live Awards	2019	Song of The Month – November	"Cabinet"	Won	
V Live Awards	2020	Stage of K-pop	Hyomin	Won	
YinYueTai V-Chart Awards	2015	Artist of the Year	Nice Body	Nominated	
YinYueTai V-Chart Awards	2017	Best Female Artist	Sketch	Won	
YinYueTai V-Chart Awards	2017	Artist of the Year	Sketch	Nominated	

=== Other recognitions ===
From	Year	Award	Ref.
National Korea Youth Day Festival	2019	Public Relations Ambassador Award	
National Korea Youth Day Festival	2020	Public Relations Ambassador Award	

=== Listicles ===
Publisher	Year	List	Ranking	Ref.
The Korea Herald	2011	Best Idol Airport Fashion of 2011	Placed	
BNT International	2014	Top 3 Female Idols Casual Fashion	Placed	
Pops In Seoul	2015	Most Fashionable Idol Stars	1st	
Forbes China	2017	Global Idol Chinese Popularity Ranking	14th	
