= Jinx!!! =

- Jinx!!! poster
- ジンクス
- Directed by: Naoto Kumazawa
- Written by: Naoto Kumazawa, Yukiko Manabe
- Produced by: Masaki Koide
- Starring: Park Hyomin; Kento Yamazaki; Kurumi Shimizu
- Music by: Goro Yasukawa
- Production company: ROBOT Production
- Distributed by: T-Joy; Cinus Entertainment Co.Ltd
- Release date: October 20, 2013
- Running time: 122 minutes
- Country: Japan

Jinx!!! (Note: Japanese: ジンクス!!!, Hepburn: Jinkusu!!!) is a 2013 Japanese romantic comedy film starring T-ara's Park Hyomin, Kento Yamazaki and Kurumi Shimizu. It was the first Japanese film to feature a South Korean Idol in a leading role. The film premiered at the 26th Tokyo International Film Festival, on October 20, 2013, becoming the first Japanese movie starring a foreign actress to achieve this honor. Additionally, It was nominated at the 14th Nippon Connection Film Festival in Frankfurt, Germany. The film's appeal extended across East Asia, with pre-sales to South Korea, Hong Kong, and Taiwan.

In 2015, Jinx!!! was selected as part of the English association "Japan Foundation Touring Film Programme" during 12th edition and was screened in various cities across the United Kingdom, including London, Belfast (Northern Ireland), Derby, Birmingham, Nottingham, Kendal, and Cumbria.

== Synopsis ==
Ji-ho is a Korean girl who has lost her boyfriend in an accident. To get over her pain, she decides to travel to Japan as an exchange student at a university. There, she meets Kaede, a shy and lonely girl who doesn't initially treat her very well. Kaede has been in love with Yusuke for a long time, who also feels the same way about her. However, neither of them dared to confess. Ji-ho, immediately realizes this and wants to help them, using Korean methods, to achieve her goal of uniting them as a couple.

== Cast ==
- Park Hyomin as Yoon Ji-ho.
- Kurumi Shimizu as Yamaguchi Kaede.
- Kento Yamazaki as Nomura Yusuke.
- Motoki Ochiai as Matsuzaka Hayato.
- Airi Matsuyama as Muroi Kuniko.
- Jeon Soo Kyung (cameo).
- Sanae Miyata as Mimura Sachie.
- Kazuya Takahashi as Sato Kiyoharu.

== Production ==
Filming began in mid-February 2013 and was finished mid-March 2013. Shooting took place mostly in Kitakyushu, Fukuoka Prefecture. Part of the movie was filmed in Kyushu International University Library in Kitakyushu City and in South Korea.

== Release ==
Jinx!!! has its world premiere at the 26th Tokyo International Film Festival on October 20, 2013, making it the first Japanese movie starring a foreign actress to do so. It hit theatres in Japan on November 16, 2013, as a limited release. The film was pre-sold to multiple East Asian countries including South Korea where it premiered on February 13, 2014, under The Dream & Pictures, Hong Kong on February 15, 2014, Singapore and Taiwan.

The film had its European premiere at the 14th Nippon Connection Film Festival in Frankfurt, Germany on May 1, 2014, under the category Nippon Cinema.

In 2015, Jinx!!! was selected as part of the English association "Japan Foundation Touring Film Programme" in its 12th edition and was screened in various cities in the United Kingdom including London at The Institute of Contemporary Arts, Belfast (Northern Ireland), Derby, Birmingham, Nottingham, Kendal and Cumbria.

== Home Media and distribution ==
Jinx!!! was released on DVD in Japan on March 14, 2014, by Toei Video in two editions. The Regular Edition included the film, special news features, and the trailer. The First press limited Edition featured two-disk sets: the first disk contained the film while the second bonus disk included behind-the-scenes videos, interviews with the main cast (Hyomin, Kurumi Shimizu, and Kento Yamazaki), coverage of events at the Tokyo International Film Festival coverage (October 17 green carpet, November 16 opening stage greeting, and November 25 thank-you stage greeting), a music video of the original soundtrack "You Gave Me Guidance", performed by T-ara, collectibles and a poster.

The film is also available for rent and purchase on Yahoo! Japan's online video streaming platform Gayo! as premium content.

== Soundtrack ==
The film's original soundtrack, titled "You Gave Me Guidance", was released by the South Korean girl group T-ara on November 20, 2013. The song was issued as the group's eighth Japanese single and later re-released on their third Japanese album Gossip Girls on May 14, 2014.

== Awards and nominations ==
| Ceremony | Year | Category | Nominee | Result | Ref. |
|---|---|---|---|---|---|
| 26th Tokyo International Film Festival | 2013 | Feature Film | Jinx!!! | Nominated | |
| 14th Nippon Connection Film Festival | 2014 | Nippon Cinema | Jinx!!! | Nominated | |

== Adaptations ==
Yukiko Manabe, who wrote the screenplay for the film, adapted it into a novel released on September 25, and into an audiobook on February 25, 2014. Additionally, the film was adapted into a manga by Japanese manga artist Reiko Momochi, which was published on November 13, 2013.
