= G-Market =

South Korean e-commerce website

Gmarket
- Native name: G마켓
- Type: Subsidiary
- Traded as: Nasdaq: GMKT
- Industry: E-commerce
- Founded: 2000; 26 years ago
- Founder: Young Bae Ku
- Headquarters: Seoul, South Korea
- Parent: G-Market Global (Note: A joint venture of the Shinsegae Group (80.01%) and eBay (19.99%), formerly known as eBay Korea.)
- Website: gmarket.co.kr

Gmarket is an e-commerce website based in South Korea. The company was founded in 2000 as a subsidiary of Interpark, and was acquired by eBay in 2009, who subsequently sold it to Shinsegae at 3.4 trillion Korean Won.

== History and Incidents ==
The predecessor of Gmarket was founded in 1999 by Young Bae Ku. At the time, it was part of the online auction company Interpark. In 2000, it spun off as its own website, known as Goodsdaq. In 2003, the website was renamed Gmarket and adopted a customer to customer e-commerce business model.

In 2006, Gmarket became the first South Korean online company to be listed on the NASDAQ. That same year, it launched its global website with product listings in English.

In 2009, eBay acquired Gmarket for approximately 1.2 billion USD after buying Gmarket shares from Interpark and Yahoo. Following the acquisition, Gmarket was delisted from the NASDAQ.

After the acquisition, G-Market received an on-site investigation by the Fair Trade Commission for allegations of unfair trade due to 11street's report of abuse of market dominant status, and was charged with a corrective order and fine from the Fair Trade Commission as well as being charged with prosecution.

However, the following year, the 6th Division of the Seoul Central District Prosecutor's Office concluded that the case was not suspicious. An official at the prosecution said, "The number of sellers who actually stopped trading with '11street' was so small that the effect of restricting competition was not reached, and it was acknowledged that the eBay Market side performed its usual management and supervision duties to prevent unfair trade, so it was disposed of without charge."

== Items and services ==
Collectibles, appliances, computers, furniture, equipment, vehicles, and other miscellaneous items can be listed, bought and sold on the website.

Counterfeit merchandise has sometimes been listed on the website, which can be difficult to distinguish from genuine items.

== Profit and Transactions ==
Gmarket generates revenue from sellers, who pay a fee based on the selling price of each item and a fee based on the starting price, and from advertising. In 2005 it was announced that Gmarket would increase fees it charges to Gmarket Store sellers, which caused considerable enough controversy. The president of Gmarket then emailed all Gmarket users with news that other fees would be decreased. Gmarket does not handle the goods, nor does it transact the buyer-seller payments, except through its subsidiary shopping mall credit. Instead, much like newspaper want-ads, sellers rely on the buyers' good faith to make payment, and buyers rely on the sellers' good faith to actually deliver the goods intact. To encourage fidelity, Gmarket maintains, rates, and publicly displays the post-transaction feedback from all users, whether they buy or sell. The buyer is encouraged to examine the sellers' feedback profile before bidding to rate their trustworthiness. Sellers with high ratings generally have more bids and garner higher bids. However, it is possible for sellers to make their feedback private and just leave the numbered rating (number of positive, negative, and neutral feedback with a positive feedback percentage), which means that bidders and sellers cannot see the comments other users have left. Gmarket also has a significant affiliate program, and affiliates can place live Gmarket Shopping product images and links on their web sites.
