= Sketch (EP) =

EP by Hyomin
- Released: March 17, 2016
- Recorded: 2015–2016
- Genres: K-pop; R&B; Synthpop; Electronic
- Labels: MBK; Interpark INT
- Producer: Ryan S. Jhun

Hyomin chronology
Make Up (2014)	Sketch (2016)	Allure (2019)

Singles from Sketch
- 1. "Gold" Released: March 17, 2016; 2. "Sketch" Released: March 17, 2016

Sketch is the second extended play by South Korean singer Hyomin. It was released on March 17, 2016, by MBK Entertainment and distributed by Interpark. The album featured two self-composed songs by Hyomin, "Still" and "Only We Are Aware of Our Story".

== Background ==
In January 2016, Hyomin's agency, MBK Entertainment revealed that Hyomin was actively preparing to return to the music scene, and was expected to release a solo album in March after a year and nine months. The video was directed by Lee Ki-bo who's known to work with YG Entertainment's artists.

Hyomin revealed to Harper's Bazaar magazine that she personally selected the songs and lyrics for th album. She also hired a music video director and an album cover photographer, then included two self-composed songs.

== Release ==
On February 19, Hyomin posted a photo with Brown Eyed Girls' JeA through Instagram, announcing that JeA is her vocal coach for this album. Hyomin revealed the name and concept photo of the new album through SNS on February 25 and confirmed the name of the lead track to be "Sketch". MBK Entertainment released the preview of the new album on March 9, with the song "Still" in the album as the preview melody.

The album was officially released on March 17 with the title track "Sketch", along with two versions of the music video for "Sketch". Hyomin made her first comeback on M Countdown, on March 17. On March 28, due to popular demand, Hyomin released a Kinho version of her album, The Kinho album runs on smartphones as a new music platform.

On March 18, Hyomin held her first release showcase for the album at Shinhan Card Fan square in Seoul.

== Composition ==
The album consists of 7 tracks (5 new songs). It features two self-composed songs by Hyomin. The lead single "Sketch" is an R&B Electronic Soul song. It compares the love between a man and a woman to a painting, hence love becomes a work of art combining an electronic-based sensuous rhythm with metaphorical lyrics. Hyomin, reportedly, spent over a week recording as she focused on recording a detailed track to fit the concept. The song had a Chinese Version as well as a Chorus Version. "Gold" is a vocal-based song that features sophisticated synth sound and piano tone. The song sends a message about being able to move forward with hope in life through the love of a loved one. Similarly to "Sketch", "Road Trip" is an electronic-based song. It is rhythmic vocals that bring out the mood of the song and vividly express the drive with a loved one. "Still", a self-composed song is a 6/8 beat song with a bluesy atmosphere. It expresses the conflict of longing for someone who must be forgotten. Banding and huskiness were added to the vocals by Hyomin to fit the song's concept. "Only we don't know our story", another self-written and composed track, is a bright song with an acoustic piano and guitar melody featuring a band sound and rhythmic melody. It's described as a song that you can relate to if you have ever experienced love conveying a contradictory and implicit meaning that 'we are the only ones who don't know our story'. Guitarist Lee Tae-wook, a member of the band Soran, participated in the song's recording.

== Track listing ==
No.	Title	Lyrics	Music	Arrangement	Length
1.	"Gold"	100% Seojeong (Jam Factory)	Ryan S. Jhun; David Quinones; Edwin Menjivar; Mateo Leboriel; Cameron Forbes	Ryan S. Jhun; David Quinones; Edwin Menjivar; Mateo Leboriel; Cameron Forbes	3:49
2.	"Road Trip"	Shin Jin-hye (Jam Factory)	Ryan S. Jhun; G'harah "PK" Degeddingseze; iDR Taylor Parks; Rodnae "chikk" Bell	Ryan S. Jhun; G'harah "PK" Degeddingseze; iDR Taylor Parks; Rodnae "chikk" Bell	3:44
3.	"Sketch"	Seo Ji-eum (Jam Factory)	Ryan S. Jhun; August Rigo; iDR; Taylor Parks	Ryan S. Jhun; August Rigo; iDR; Taylor Parks	3:20
4.	"Still" (아직은)	Yong Jun-hyung	Hyomin; Mokujin's	Mokujin's	3:31
5.	"Only We Are Unaware of Our Story" (우리의 이야기를 우리만 모르는 채)	Hyomin; Alex Kang	Hyomin; Mokujin's	Mokujin's	3:32
6.	"Sketch" (Chinese version)	Seo Ji-eum (Jam Factory)	Ryan S. Jhun; August Rigo; iDR; Taylor Parks	Ryan S. Jhun; August Rigo; iDR; Taylor Parks	3:20
7.	"Sketch" (Chorus version)	Seo Ji-eum (Jam Factory)	Ryan S. Jhun; August Rigo; iDR; Taylor Parks	Ryan S. Jhun; August Rigo; iDR; Taylor Parks	3:20
Total length:					23:16

== Controversy ==
On March 1, 2016, MBK Entertainment released a promotional photo of the album teaser. Compared with the previously announced behind-the-scenes photos, it was found that the promotional photo originally taken with clothes was turned into a half-naked photo after it was released, which caused anger to fans. After the comparison, it was found that Hyomin was wearing black underwear when she originally took the promotional photo, and the published promotional photo had obvious traces of editing on Hyomin's arm.

== Reception ==
"Gold" was well-received by critics praising mostly its lyrics and Hyomin's vocals. Tamar Herman from Billboard commanded the song's atmosphere and its "warm embrace of the hazy synths and layered strings paired with the T-ara member's breathy cooing sounds" pointing out the similarities to British pop singer Sia's songs. She also praised Park's performance of the song and how she "earnestly expresses how love improves her, or makes her golden, it's hard not to feel the power of love". The song was included on the list of best K-pop songs to listen on Valentine's Day. It was also placed among "The 40 Best K-Pop Deep Cuts of the Decade Critics' Picks" list, by Billboard.

=== Commercial performance ===
The album was a commercial success peaking at number 3 on the Weekly Gaon album chart and at number 8 on the monthly chart becoming Hyomin's highest peaks on both charts. By the end of April, Sketch sold over 13,000 physical copies becoming Hyomin's best-selling album to date. Internationally, the standard version of Sketch debuted at number 1 on China's weekly albums chart, where it charted for 101 weeks, while the 19 limited edition peaked at number 4 on the same chart, and charted for 96 weeks, an all-time record for a South Korean female artist. The lead single "Sketch" also topped Billboard China's weekly singles for 8 weeks, the only South Korean artist to achieve this to date.

== Charts ==
Chart	Peak
South Korea Weekly Albums (Circle)	3
China Weekly Albums (YinYueTai)	1
South Korea Monthly Albums (Circle)	8

== Accolades ==
=== Awards and nominations ===
Award ceremony	Year	Category	Nominee / Work	Result	Ref.
YinYueTai V-Chart Awards	2017	Best Female Artist	Sketch	Won	
YinYueTai V-Chart Awards	2017	Artist of the Year	Sketch	Nominated	

=== Listicles ===
Publisher	Year	Listicle	Recipient	Placement	Ref.
Billboard	2017	The 40 Best K-Pop Deep Cuts of the Decade Critics' Picks	"Gold"	14th	
Billboard	2019	35 K-Pop Love Songs For Valentine's Day	"Gold"	Placed	

== Release history ==
Region	Date	Format	Label
South Korea	March 17, 2016	CD	MBK Entertainment; Interpark INT
South Korea	March 17, 2016	Digital download	MBK Entertainment
Worldwide	March 17, 2016	Digital download	MBK Entertainment
South Korea	March 28	KIHNO Album	MBK Entertainment

== See also ==
List of Billboard China V Chart number-one videos of 2016
