= Make Up (EP) =

EP by Hyomin
- Released: June 30, 2014
- Recorded: 2013–2014
- Genres: K-pop; dance-pop; electropop
- Length: 17:33
- Labels: Core Contents; KT Music
- Producer: Kwon Shi-bong

Hyomin chronology
| Make Up (2014) | Sketch (2016) |

Singles from Make Up
- 1. "Nice Body (featuring Loco)" Released: June 30, 2014

Make Up is the debut extended play by South Korean singer Hyomin. It was released on June 30, 2014, by Core Contents Media. "Nice Body" was released as the lead single.

After making an announcement that two members of T-ara would be making their solo debuts, Core Contents Media released a teaser of Hyomin on April 29, followed by another teaser and another announcement about the name of the single and EP on June 2.

== Release and promotion ==
On May 29, 2014, Hyomin expressed through her agency that she would make her solo debut in the music scene, and the name of the new album will be announced on June 2. Hyomin released the album concept photo on June 11. On June 16, the agency stated that Hyomin's album will be released and on June 2. On June 27, the agency stated that Hyomin's album will be released ahead of schedule on June 30.

A press conference for the release of the new album was held at JBK TOWER in Samseong-dong, Gangnam, Seoul.

Hyomin made her solo debut stage on the July 4 episode of KBS' Music Bank.

The full music video for "Nice Body" and full EP were released on the June 30, 2014.

== Creative background ==
Hyomin said in an interview on July 2 that "34-24-36" in the music video for the title song "Nice Body" represents a woman's perfect body. In the music video of the title song "Nice Body", Hyomin puts her body in an extreme state of two poses . A regular version and a dance version of the music video were both released on June 30, 2014, the same day as the album's release.

In the interview, Hyomin stated that the creative background of her first self-written song "Overcome" is to convey the meaning of "you can do it, you can stand up" to people in real life .

Hyomin participated in the production of the album's costumes, hair styling, packaging, choreography, music video, design, etc.

== Composition ==
The album consists of 5 tracks (3 new songs). It features Hyomin's first attempt at songwriting and composition.

The title song "Nice Body" is a slow-tempo hip-hop track harmonized with groovy organ sounds, in collaboration with composer Brave Brothers. The lyrics express the feelings of a woman who wants to look good to a man. The song also criticizes society's unrealistic body norms for women. Body sizes, gym equipments were features on both the music video and the live stages to better convey the song's message.

The b-side song, "Fake It" is a medium-tempo hip-hop track. It is about the pain of pretending to be okay in order to avoid showing the other person the pain of a breakup. It is a more vocal-based song with simpler choreography in comparison to the title track.

Lastly, "Overcome", a self-composed track, applies a retro Hip-Hop sound. It conveys a dual meaning; a story (based on Hyomin's own life experience) and a courageous and a strong spirited protagonist.

== Track listing ==
| No. | Title | Lyrics | Music | Length |
|---|---|---|---|---|
| 1. | "Nice Body" (featuring LOCO) | D.C. Kang, Loco (H.W. Kwon) | D.C. Kang, Elephant Kingdom | 3:28 |
| 2. | "Fake It" (척했어) | D.C. Kang, Chakun; J. Kim | D.C. Kang, Star Wars | 3:09 |
| 3. | "Overcome" (담) | Hyomin | Hyomin | 4:04 |
| 4. | "Nice Body" (Instrumental) | | D.C. Kang, Elephant Kingdom | 3:28 |
| 5. | "Fake It" (Instrumental) | | D.C. Kang, Star Wars | 3:09 |
| Total length: | | | | 17:33 |

== Reception ==
=== Critical reception ===
The album received mixed reviews as the album tracks were praised while the controversial music video caused critics to doubt the song's intentions. Scott Interrante of PopMatters praised the music video's ability the bring attention to current beauty standards "it may actually be trying to bring attention to the ridiculous standards we place on women and pop stars in our society". He also described the song as strong, fun and summery.

=== Commercial performance ===
"Nice Body" charted at number 13 on the Gaon Weekly Single Chart for digital releases.

== Awards and nominations ==
| Award ceremony | Year | Category | Result | Ref. |
|---|---|---|---|---|
| MTV Best Of The Best Awards | 2014 | Best Sexy | Won | |
| KU Awards | 2014 | Best Female Artist | Won | |
| Seoul Music Awards | 2014 | Bonsang Award | Nominated | |
| Seoul Music Awards | 2014 | Hallyu Special Award | Nominated | |
| Seoul Music Awards | 2014 | Popularity Award | Nominated | |

== Chart performance ==
=== Albums chart ===
| Chart | Peak position |
|---|---|
| Gaon Weekly albums chart | 6 |
| Gaon Monthly albums chart | 15 |

=== Singles ===
| Chart | Peak position |
|---|---|
| YinYueTai Chart | 1 |
| Gaon Download Singles Chart | 9 |
| Gaon Singles Chart | 13 |
| Billboard K-Pop Hot 100 | 18 |

== Sales and certifications ==
Make Up Physical Sales
| Country | Sales |
|---|---|
| South Korea Gaon | 8,868+ |

Nice Body Digital Sales
| Country | Sales |
|---|---|
| South Korea (Gaon) | 205,741+ |

== Release history ==
| Region | Date | Format | Publisher |
|---|---|---|---|
| Various | June 30, 2014 | Digital download | MBK Entertainment; Kakao M |
| South Korea | June 30, 2014 | Digital download | MBK Entertainment |
| South Korea | June 30, 2014 | CD | MBK Entertainment |
