= Allure (EP) =

EP by Hyomin
- Released: February 20, 2019
- Recorded: 2018–2019
- Genre: Contemporary R&B
- Length: 24:41
- Language: Korean
- Labels: Sublime Artist Agency; Kakao M
- Producers: Rhymer, Hyomin

Hyomin chronology
Sketch (2016)	Allure (2019)

Singles from Allure
- 1. "Mango" Released: September 12, 2018; 2. "U Um U Um" Released: January 19, 2019; 3. "Allure" Released: February 20, 2019

Allure is the third extended play by South Korean singer Hyomin. It was released on February 20, 2019, by Sublime Artist Agency. The album was produced by Rhymer and Hyomin.

The album name Allure means look in French, and "a fascinating and mysterious attraction" in English, it signifies a unique sound of music only Hyomin can express.

Following her digital singles "Mango", represented by yellow, and "U Um U Um", represented by emerald; the album Allure, represented by an intense color of red, will complete the color variations. As of gain chart the album sold 10,500 Copies on Gaon

== Release ==
On August 7, 2018, it was revealed that Hyomin was aiming for a mid-September solo comeback with R&B Pop, working with producers from EXO's "Ko Ko Bop", Twice's "Dance The Night Away". On September 12, 2018, Hyomin released 1st digital single titled "Mango", followed by a showcase. It marked her first comeback since leaving MBK Entertainment. On January 20, 2019, Hyomin released 2nd digital single titled "U Um U Um" ahead of her 3rd solo mini album expected to be released in mid-February. The single was not promoted on weekly music shows. On February 20, 2019, Hyomin released her third mini album Allure. The album's title track is also called "Allure (입꼬리)".

== Composition ==
Allure concludes the color variation project, where each song is assigned a color that reflects its theme. Hyomin revealed she has loved painting since she was young, hence the color theme for the album. The project started with the release of the digital single "Mango"; represented by yellow, followed by "U Um U Um"; represented by emerald. "Allure" represents the intense color red. This marks Hyomin first album in three years. It consists of eight tracks, only three of which are new.

The title song "Allure" was co-produced by Rhymer, Brand New Music's CEO, who has worked on songs by BTS, Twice, and GOT7. The music video was a joint work between GDW and segaji film, which produced BTS "Mic Drop (Steve Aoki Remix)" and Zico (feat. IU)'s "Soulmate". The word 'Allure' means 'look' in French and 'the quality of being powerfully and mysteriously attractive or fascinating' in English. The song is an acoustic-based medium pop song with a sophisticated sound In which Hyomin expresses her confidence in making someone fall in love with her fatal charm with a provocative feel and youthful energy. The beat reminisces the confident steps that flow throughout the song fits well with Hyomin's fashionable image. 1Million's MayJ Lee, was in charge of the choreography. The song received a Chinese Version and a Jazz version as well which features piano and Nylon guitar as the main elements.

"U Um U Um" is an up-tempo dance pop song based on Latin beats. It conveys the humming of an excited heart with sensuous lyrics that compare the deepening feelings of falling in love to waves. "You" is about the regret of a person who has let go of their beloved, not knowing how precious they were when they were by their side.

"Mango" is a pop song based on minimal synth sounds, combining 808 bass and a unique melody line. It compares the subtle emotional lines and complex romantic psychology between a man and a woman who have just met to Mango. Hyomin compare herself to a mango by having a "steadfast heart", even though she may look kind and soft. Then, in twist, "Mango" becomes "Man go" signifying the end of the relationship and independence.

== Reception ==
=== Commercial performance ===
Allure was a commercial success peaking at No.11 on Gaon weekly chart and at No.26 on the monthly chart. According to Hanteo's official yearly chart, the album sold more than 10,500 copies, making it one of the best selling female solo releases in 2019 and Hyomin's second EP to reach this mark. "Allure", as well as "U Um U Um" and "Mango", charted at number one on the YinYueTai China chart making Hyomin the only South Korean artist to top the chart with 3 singles from the same album. The singles also charted on KKBox and appeared in various countries including Japan, Malaysia, Taiwan.

=== Critical reception ===
An editor for KKBox Taiwan praised "Mango" and highlighted its addictive theme and melody.

== Track listing ==
No.	Title	Lyrics	Music	Arrangement	Length
1.	"Allure" (Jazz Version)	Rhymer, earattack, 김좌영	earattack, 김좌영	earattack	3:10
2.	"Allure"	Rhymer, earattack, 김좌영	earattack, 김좌영	earattack	2:53
3.	"U Um U Um"	황유빈	Jim Andre Bergsted, Mats Koray Genc, Brooke Toia, Joakim Arnt Holmen	Jim Andre Bergsted, Mats Koray Genc, Brooke Toia, Joakim Arnt Holmen	2:55
4.	"Mango"	황유빈	Kyle Buckley, George Howard, Michael Flint, Astrid Roelants, MZMC	PinkSlip, The 23rd	3:09
5.	"YOU" (눈가에 한 방울)	Lohi, Rhymer	Lohi, SFRM	Lohi	3:37
6.	"Allure" (Chinese version)	Rhymer, earattack, 김좌영	earattack, 김좌영	earattack	2:53
7.	"U Um U Um" (Chinese version)	황유빈	Jim Andre Bergsted, Mats Koray Genc, Brooke Toia, Joakim Arnt Holmen	Jim Andre Bergsted, Mats Koray Genc, Brooke Toia, Joakim Arnt Holmen	2:55
8.	"Mango" (Chinese version)	황유빈	Kyle Buckley, George Howard, Michael Flint, Astrid Roelants, MZMC	PinkSlip, The 23rd	3:09
Total length:					24:41

== Charts ==
Chart (2019)	Peak position
South Korean Weekly Albums (Gaon)	11
South Korean Monthly Albums (Gaon)	26

== Credits ==
Credits adapted from MelOn.

Album Producer – Rhymer, Hyomin

- Hyomin – Lead singer (All tracks), Background Vocals (Tracks 3,4,7,8)
- Rhymer – Lyrics (Tracks 1,2,5,6)
- Earattack – Lyrics, Composition, arrangement, Drums, Keyboard, Background Vocals (Tracks 1,2,6)
- Kim Jwa-young – Lyrics, Composition, Bass (Tracks 1,2,6)
- Hwang Yubin – Lyrics (Tracks 3,4,7,8)
- Jim Andre Bergsted – Composition, arrangement (Tracks 3,7)
- Mats Koray Genc – Composition, arrangement (Tracks 3,7)
- Brooke Toia – Composition, arrangement (Tracks 3,7)
- Joakim Arnt Holmen – Composition, arrangement (Tracks 3,7)
- Kyle Buckley – Composition (Tracks 4,8)
- George Howard Michael Flint – Composition (Tracks 4,8)
- Astrid Roelants – Composition (Tracks 4,8)
- MZMC – Composition (Tracks 4,8)
- PinkSlip – arrangement (Tracks 4,8)
- The 23rd – arrangement (Tracks 4,8)
- Lohi – Lyrics, Composition, arrangement, Piano, Drums, Bass, programming (Track 5)
- SFRM – Composition (Track 5)
- Jiyoon Park – Piano (Track 1)
- XEPY – Vocal director (Track 1)
- Woo Min-jeong – recording (Track 1)
- Minhee Kim – Digital Editing, recording (Track 1,2,5,6)
- Master Key – Mixing, Mastering (Track 1,2,5,6)
- Kim Jong-seong – Guitar (Track 1,2,6)
- Kim Doyeon – Background vocals (Track 2,6)
- Jeong Yu-ra – Digital Editing (Track 2,6)
- Jinseok Choi – Vocal director (Track 3)
- Eun-kyung Jeong – Recording, Digital Editing (Track 3,4,7,8)
- Min-jeong Woo – Recording (Track 3)
- Seokmin Kim – Mixing (Track 3,8)
- Namwoo Kwon – Mastering (Track 3,4,8)
- Deez – Vocal director (Track 4)
- Kang Tae-woo – Background vocals (Track 4,8)
- Jeong Eui-seok – Mixing (Track 4)
- Hwang Seong-jun – Guitar (Track 5)
- Kim Hyuna – Background vocals (Track 5)

== Release history ==
Region	Date	Format	Label
South Korea	20 February 2019	CD	Sublime Artist Agency; Kakao M
South Korea	20 February 2019	Digital download	Sublime Artist Agency
Various	20 February 2019	Digital download	Sublime Artist Agency
