= Shinsadong Tiger production discography =

The following is a discography of songs written or produced by South Korean music producer Shinsadong Tiger. This information is adapted from the Korea Music Copyright Association's online copyright search database. Shinsadong Tiger's ID in the database is W0574700.

== 2005 ==
Artist	Song	Album
Jang Woo-hyuk	"Sorry"	No More Drama
Seong Si-un	"Spy" (스파이)	Sweet Spy OST
Seong Si-un	"Spy Guitar version" (스파이 기타 버전)	Sweet Spy OST
The Red	"Just Like That" (그대로 그렇게)	The Red
The Jadu	"Man and Woman" (남과여)	Jadu 4

== 2006 ==
Artist	Song	Album
Eru	"With You"	Level II
Hongman Choi	"Beauty and the Beast" (미녀와 야수)	Non-album single
Jang Woo-hyuk	"Man in the Yellow Shirt" (노란 샤쓰의 사나이)	My Way
Jang Woo-hyuk	"Real Man" (진짜 남자)	My Way
Jang Woo-hyuk	"One Way" (폭풍속으로)	My Way
Jang Woo-hyuk	"Oh No!"	My Way
Jina	"It's So Hot"	Non-album singles
Jina	"Moon Night"	Non-album singles

== 2007 ==
Artist	Song	Album
As One & 2NB	"Holiday"	The Rival Season 1
Baby Vox Re.V	"Get Up"	Baby Vox Re.V
Baby Vox Re.V	"Secret"	Baby Vox Re.V
Baby Vox Re.V	"Shee"	Baby Vox Re.V
Beauty and the Beast (Hongman Choi & Kang Su-hee)	"Beauty and the Beast" (미녀와 야수)	Non-album single
Eru	"Greetings" (인사말)	Eru Returns
Hyun Young	"Draw Out"	Love Revolution
Kim Dong-wan	"Loving Summer" (여름이 좋아)	Kimdongwan Is
Lee Hyori	"Toc Toc Toc (version 2)" (톡톡톡 version 2)	If in Love... Like Them OST
Na Yoon-kwon	"It's Allright"	After
Wheesung	"Soothing Touch" (만져주기) (feat. Younha)	Eternal Essence of Music

== 2008 ==
Artist	Song	Album
15975	"Feel of the Night"	Audition
Jang Geun	"Universal Love Song" (전국민 러브송)	Universal Love Song
Gilgun	"Sun Country" (태양의 나라)	Light of the World
Jewelry	"Everybody, Shh!" (모두 다 쉿!)	Kitchi Island
Jewelry	"The Cradle Song"	Kitchi Island
Kim Jong-kook	"Poisoned in Love" (사랑에 취해)	Here I Am
Mario	"I'm Yours" (난 너에게)	Time to Mario
Mario	"If You Want To" (너만 괜찮다면)	Time to Mario
Mario	"Duseoeomneun norae" (두서없는 노래)	Time to Mario
MC Mong	"In The Old Days" (옛날 옛적에)	Show's Just Begun
Mighty Mouth	"Energy" (에너지) (feat. Sunye)	Energy
Mighty Mouth	"Come On Come On" (feat. D)	Energy
Mighty Mouth	"Family" (feat. Son Dam-bi)	Energy
Yuri	"Jeojeun nabi" (젖은 나비)	The Ring of Diamond

== 2009 ==
Artist	Song	Album
4Minute	"Won't Give You" (안줄래)	For Muzik
4Minute	"Hot Issue"	For Muzik
4Minute	"Hot Issue" (Shinsadong Tiger Remix)	For Muzik
4Minute	"Muzik"	For Muzik
4Minute	"What A Girl Wants"	For Muzik
Ajoo	"Wealthy 2nd Generation" (재벌2세)	Wealthy 2nd Generation
Ajoo	"Everything Is In My Hands"	Wealthy 2nd Generation
Astro	"Sexy Girl" (feat. Jeon Gun)	We Will Go
Beast	"Yet" (아직은)	Beast Is the B2ST
Beast	"Bad Girl"	Beast Is the B2ST
Beast	"Beast Is the B2ST"	Beast Is the B2ST
Beast	"Mystery"	Beast Is the B2ST
Brian Joo	"Dreaming"	Manifold
Byul	"Kiss Day"	Like A Star
Ivy	"Good"	I Be
Jewelry	"Oops"	Sophisticated
Jewelry S	"Listen" (들어봐)	Sweet Song
Kim Hyun-jung	"Gold Miss Goes" (골드미스가 간다)	Non-album single
Kim Jong-kook	"Give It to Me" (따줘)	Non-album single
Koyote	"More!" (더!)	Jumping
L.E.O	"Love Train"	Geomeuntti
Mighty Mouth	"Smile" (웃어)	Smile
Mighty Mouth	"Real Man"	Smile
T-ara	"Bo Peep Bo Peep"	Absolute First Album
T-ara	"One & One"	Absolute First Album
Taegoon	"Tell Me" (말해줘)	The 3rd Mini Album
Taegoon	"Finally"	The 3rd Mini Album
Uhm Jung-hwa	"Recipe"	He Who Can't Marry OST
Wax	"Gold Miss Diary" (골드미스 다이어리)	Always You

== 2010 ==
Artist	Song	Album
2PM & Girls' Generation	"Cabi Song"	Non-album single
3Chongsa	"Eat Eat" (먹어 먹어)	Non-album single
4Minute	"HuH"	Hit Your Heart
4Minute	"Invitation"	Hit Your Heart
4Minute	"I My Me Mine"	Hit Your Heart
4Minute	"Who's Next"	Hit Your Heart
4Minute	"First" (Japanese version)	Diamond
4Minute	"I My Me Mine" (Japanese version)	Diamond
4Minute	"Muzik" (Japanese version)	Diamond
Anna	"Just 5 Minutes" (5분만)	Non-album single
Beast	"Just Before Shock"	Shock of the New Era
Beast	"Special"	Shock of the New Era
Beast	"Shock"	Shock of the New Era
Beast	"Breath" (숨)	Mastermind
Beast	"Mastermind"	Mastermind
Beast	"I Like You the Best" (니가 제일 좋아)	Lights Go On Again
Beast	"Beautiful"	Lights Go On Again
Beast	"Lightless"	Lights Go On Again
Beast	"Lights Go On Again"	Lights Go On Again
Beast	"Lights Go On Again (Full version)"	My Story
Faddy Robot	"Faddy Robot"	Non-album single
G.NA	"Supa Solo" (feat. Swings)	Draw G's First Breath
Group of 20	"Let's Go"	Group of 20
Group of 20	"Let's Go" (English version)	Group of 20
Hyuna	"Change" (feat. Yong Jun-hyung)	Non-album single
IU	"Merry Christmas Ahead" (미리 메리 크리스마스)	Real
Nine Muses	"Ladies"	Let's Have a Party
Park Jung-min	"Not Alone"	Not Alone
Park Jung-min	"Do You Know?" (넌 알고 있니)	Not Alone
Secret	"Magic"	Secret Time
T-ara	"I'm in Pain" (내가 너무 아파)	Breaking Heart
T-ara	"I Don't Know" (몰라요)	Temptastic

== 2011 ==
Artist	Song	Album
4Minute	"4Minutes Left"	4Minutes Left
4Minute	"Heart to Heart"	4Minutes Left
4Minute	"Mirror Mirror" (거울아 거울아)	4Minutes Left
4Minute	"First"	4Minutes Left
4Minute	"Hide & Seek"	4Minutes Left
Apink	"Wishlist"	Seven Springs of Apink
Apink	"My My"	Snow Pink
Apink	"Yeah"	Snow Pink
Beast	"Fiction"	Fiction and Fact
Beast	"Fiction" (Orchestra version)	Fiction and Fact
Beast	"Freeze"	Fiction and Fact
Beast	"The Fact"	Fiction and Fact
Beast	"Lightless" (Unplugged version)	Fiction and Fact
C-Real	"Don't Do That Again" (그러지 좀 마)	Round 1
Dalmatian	"That Man Opposed" (그 남자는 반대)	Dalmatian
F-ve Dolls	"Without You" (네가 없이도)	Club Remix Time to Play
Hyuna	"Bubble Pop!"	Bubble Pop!
Hyuna	"Downtown" (feat. Jeon Ji-yoon)	Bubble Pop!
Jang Woo-hyuk	"Time Is [L]over" (시간이 멈춘 날)	I Am the Future
Kim Wan-sun	"Be Quiet" (feat. Yong Jung-hyung)	Non-album single
Led Apple	"Someone Met By Chance" (어쩌다 마주친)	CODA
Lee Bo-ram (SeeYa)	"In the Room" (방안에서)	Supermarket - The Half
Lee Gi-kwang, Yoon Doo-joon & Yong Jun-hyung (Beast)	"Should I Hug or Not" (안을까 말까)	Supermarket - The Half
Mighty Mouth	"Mess" (난장판)	Mighty Fresh
Mighty Mouth	"Racing Queen"	Racing Queen OST
Shinsadong Tiger	"Golla Golla" (골라 골라)	Supermarket - The Half
Son Dong-woon (Beast)	"In The Cloud"	Supermarket - The Half
T-ara	"I Don't Know" (몰라요) (Remix)	John Travolta Wannabe
T-ara	"Roly Poly"	John Travolta Wannabe
T-ara	"Roly Poly in Copacabana"	Roly Poly in Copacabana
Trouble Maker	"Trouble Maker"	Trouble Maker

== 2012 ==
Artist	Song	Album
4Minute	"Volume Up"	Volume Up
Apink	"I Got You"	Une Année
Apink	"Step"	Une Année
Beast	"Midnight" (별 헤는 밤)	Midnight Sun
EXID	"I Do"	Holla
EXID	"Whoz That Girl"	Holla
EXID	"Call" (전화벨)	Hippity Hop
EXID	"Whoz That Girl Part 2"	Hippity Hop
Hyuna	"Very Hot"	Melting
Jewelry	"Intro"	Look at Me
Jewelry	"Look at Me"	Look at Me
Joosuc	"Beoseo deonjyeo" (벗어 던져) (feat. Boni)	5 Point 5
Kim Jong-kook	"December" (회상) (feat. Joosuc)	Non-album single
Led Apple	"Time Is Up"	Time Is Up
Park Mu-jin	"Dalla Dalla" (달라 달라)	Dalla Dalla
Secret	"Talk That"	Talk That
T-ara	"Lovey Dovey"	Funky Town
T-ara	"Lovey Dovey" (Club remix version)	Funky Town
T-ara	"Sexy Love"	Mirage
VIXX	"Rock Ur Body"	Rock Ur Body
Wonder Boyz	"Open The Door" (문을 여시오)	Open The Door

== 2013 ==
Artist	Song	Album
Ailee	"U&I"	A's Doll House
Apink	"No No No"	Secret Garden
BtoB	"Why" (왜이래)	Thriller
Cube Artists (Jang Hyun-seung, Jung Eun-ji, Kim Nam-joo)	"A Year Ago" (일년전에)	A Cube for Season #White
Dasoni	"Good Bye"	Good Bye
Dasoni	"Said So Often" (아주 흔한 말)	Good Bye
F-ve Dolls	"Lov"	First Love
Fiestar	"Intro"	Curious
Fiestar	"I Don't Know" (아무것도 몰라요)	Curious
Fiestar	"I Don't Know" (아무것도 몰라요) (R. Tee remix)	Curious
Fiestar	"Head, Shoulders, Knee, Foot" (머리 어깨 무릎 발)	Curious
Im Chang-jung	"Open The Door" (문을 여시오)	Non-album single
Jeon Guk Gu (of Gag Concert)	"Fashion City"	Fashion City
Led Apple	"With The Wind" (바람따라)	Non-album single
Park Si-hwan	"My Love" (내 사람)	Superstar K 5 Top 10
Speed	"It's Over" (feat. Park Bo-young)	Superior Speed
T-ara	"Number Nine" (넘버나인)	Again
T-ara	"Do You Know Me?" (나 어떡해)	Again 1977
T-ara	"1977 Do You Know Me" (1977 기억 안나)	Again 1977
Trouble Maker	"Now" (내일은 없어)	Chemistry
VIXX	"Only U" (대답은 너니까)	Voodoo

== 2014 ==
Artist	Song	Album
2000 Won	"By My Side" (내 옆으로 와)	1st Mini Album
Ann Shin-young	"Love's Pendulum" (사랑의 시계추)	Oppa Ajik Eoryeo
Ann Shin-young	"Oppa ajik eoryeo" (오빤 아직 어려)	Oppa Ajik Eoryeo
Apink	"Luv"	Pink Luv
Boys Republic	"Round" (가운데)	Real Talk
C-Clown	"Tell Me" (말해줘)	Non-album single
C-Clown	"Justice" (암행어사)	Let's Love
Dal Shabet	"B.B.B (Big Baby Baby)"	B.B.B
EXID	"Up & Down"	Ah Yeah
Fiestar	"Tight" (타이트해)	My Lovely Girl OST
Fiestar	"One More" (하나 더)	Non-album single
Led Apple	"Left Alone" (둘도 없는 바보)	Non-album single
Led Apple	"Who Are You?"	Non-album single
M.Pire	"Not That Kind of Person" (그런 애 아니야)	Rumor
Park Jung-ah	"Because of You"	Doctor Stranger OST
Speed	"Don't Tease Me" (놀리러 간다)	Speed Circus
Speed	"Look At Me Now"	Look At Me Now
T-ara	"Sugar Free"	And & End
T-ara	"ORGR"	And & End
T-ara	"S. Tiger Sugar Free"	EDM Club Sugar Free Edition
T-ara	"Big Bounce Sugar Free"	EDM Club Sugar Free Edition
T-ara	"Chuckie Sugar Free"	EDM Club Sugar Free Edition
T-ara	"Dion Sugar Free"	EDM Club Sugar Free Edition
T-ara	"FBTA Sugar Free"	EDM Club Sugar Free Edition
T-ara	"Ferry Sugar Free"	EDM Club Sugar Free Edition
T-ara	"Jeffrey Choi Sugar Free"	EDM Club Sugar Free Edition
T-ara	"Monster Factory Sugar Free"	EDM Club Sugar Free Edition
T-ara	"Phatsound Sugar Free"	EDM Club Sugar Free Edition

== 2015 ==
Artist	Song	Album
A.KOR	"Always"	Non-album single
Apink	"Remember"	Pink Memory
Crayon Pop	"FM"	FM
DIA	"My Friend's Boyfriend" (내 친구의 남자친구)	Do It Amazing
DIA	"Somehow" (왠지)	Do It Amazing
DIA	"Music Lover" (음악 들을래)	Do It Amazing
DIA	"Lean On Me"	Do It Amazing
EXID	"Ah Yeah" (아예)	Ah Yeah
EXID	"Thrilling" (아슬해)	Ah Yeah
EXID	"Pat Pat" (토닥토닥)	Ah Yeah
EXID	"With Out U"	Ah Yeah
EXID	"1M"	Ah Yeah
EXID	"Every Night (Version 2)" (매일 밤)	Ah Yeah
EXID	"Hot Pink"	Street
Fiestar	"You're Pitiful" (짠해)	Black Label
Han Hee-jun	“QnA” (with Tiffany)	Non-album single
Hani (EXID) & Ken (VIXX)	"Gap" (빈틈)	Non-album single
Lee Seung-chul	"Thought of You" (그리움만 쌓이네)	Time Goes Fast Like an Arrow
Lee Seung-chul	"Time Goes Fast Like an Arrow" (시간 참 빠르다)	Time Goes Fast Like an Arrow
Shannon	"20 Inch"	Eighteen

== 2016 ==
Artist	Song	Album
Apink	"Oh Yes"	Pink Revolution
CLC	"No Oh Oh" (아니야)	Nu.Clear
Dal Shabet	"Fri. Sat. Sun" (금토일)	Fri. Sat. Sun
Dasoni	"Only One"	Street
EXID	"Are You Hungry" (냠냠쩝쩝; Jeonghwa & Hyelin)	Street
EXID	"Cream"	Street
EXID	"Lie"	Street
EXID	"Lie" (Jannabi remix)	Street
EXID	"Hot Pink" (Remix)	Street
Yezi	"Chase" (끌려다녀) (feat. Babylon)	Non-album single

== 2017 ==
Artist	Song	Album
Apink	"Five"	Pink Up
EXID	"Night Rather Than Day" (낮보다는 밤)	Eclipse
EXID	"Boy"	Eclipse
EXID	"How Why"	Eclipse
EXID	"Velvet" (LE solo)	Eclipse
EXID	"DDD" (덜덜덜)	Full Moon
EXID	"Alice" (feat. PinkMoon; Jeonghwa solo)	Full Moon
EXID	"Too Good to Me"	Full Moon
EXID	"Weeknd" (LE & Hani)	Full Moon
Hyuna	"Babe" (베베)	Following
SeSeSe, Hot Chicks, Brand New, Hi-Lite	"Game Of Thrones With 12 Producers" (왕좌의 게임 - 12인의 프로듀서)	Tribe of Hip Hop OST
Yezi	"Anck Su Namum" (아낙수나문)	Non-album single

== 2018 ==
Artist	Song	Album
DIA	"WooWoo" (우우)	Summer Ade
EXID	"Lady" (내일해)	Lady
EXID	"I Love You" (알러뷰)	I Love You
Momoland	"Bboom Bboom"	Great!
Momoland	"Baam"	Fun to the World
Park Seong Yeon	"Peach" (복숭아; Dance version)	Peach
Uni.T	"No More" (넘어)	Line

== 2019 ==
Artist	Song	Album
DIA	"Woowa" (우와)	Newtro
DIA	"No" (안할래)	Newtro
EXID	"Me & You"	We
EXID	"The Vibe" (아끼지마)	We
EXID	"We Are"	We
Momoland	"I'm So Hot"	Show Me
Trei	"Lonely Night" (너의밤)	Born
Trei	"Gravity" (멀어져)	Born
Trei	"Turn the Light" (안아줘)	Born
Trei	"Deep" (어질해)	Born

== 2020 ==
Artist	Song	Album
Everglow	"Let Me Dance"	The Spies Who Loved Me OST
XUM	"DDALALA"	Non-album single

== 2021 ==
Artist	Song	Album
Riman Korea	"The Light"	Riman Song
Tri.be	"Loca"	Tri.be Da Loca
Tri.be	"Doom Doom Ta" (둠둠타)	Tri.be Da Loca
Tri.be	"Rub-A-Dum" (러버덤)	Conmigo
Tri.be	"Loro"	Conmigo
Tri.be	"Would You Run" (우주로)	Veni Vidi Vici
Tri.be	"Lobo"	Veni Vidi Vici
Tri.be	"18"	Veni Vidi Vici
Tri.be	"Got Your Back"	Veni Vidi Vici
Tri.be	"True"	Veni Vidi Vici
Tri.be	"Santa For You"	Non-album single

== 2022 ==
Artist	Song	Album
EXID	"Fire" (불이나)	X
EXID	"Fire" (English version)	X
EXID	"IDK (I Don't Know)"	X
Lee Min Sun	"Crocs Beats" (feat. Elly)	Non-album single
Modern RBW	"Control" (feat. Loca)	Modern RBW Vol. 15
TAN	"Midnight" (별 헤는 밤)	2TAN (We version)
Tri.be	"Kiss"	Leviosa
Tri.be	"In the Air (777)"	Leviosa

== 2023 ==
Artist	Song	Album
TAN	"Heartbeat"	TAN Made
Tri.be	"Stay Together"	W.A.Y
Tri.be	"We Are Young"	W.A.Y
Tri.be	"Witch"	W.A.Y
Tri.be	"Wonderland"	W.A.Y
Tri.be	"Would You Run" (우주로; Original version)	W.A.Y
Tri.be	"Papa Noel"	Little Drummer Girls

== 2024 ==
Artist	Song	Album
Tri.be	"Diamond"	Diamond
Tri.be	"Run"	Diamond
TAN	"HyperTonic"	W Series 3TAN (World Ver.)
