= So Crazy (T-ara song) =

2015 single by T-ara

Single by T-ara

from the EP So Good
- Language: Korean
- English title: So Crazy
- Released: August 4, 2015
- Recorded: 2015
- Genre: K-pop; Dance-pop
- Length: 3:19
- Label: Dreamus
- Songwriters: Brave Brothers; GALACTIKA

T-ara singles chronology
"Little Apple" (2014)	"So Crazy" (2015)	"Tiamo" (2016)

Music video
- So Crazy on YouTube; So Crazy (Chinese Ver.) on YouTube

"So Crazy" (Korean: 완전 미쳤네) is a single recorded by South Korean girl group T-ara. Released on August 4, 2015, it served as the lead track for the group's seventh extended play, So Good.

== Background and release ==
In July 2015, MBK Entertainment announced that T-ara would be returning with comeback with their first album in 11 months, set for release the following month. Group and individual teaser photos were unveiled on July 27, 2015. "So Crazy" was officially released digitally on August 4, 2015, at noon. Additionally, to cater to their international audience, T-ara released a Chinese version of the song, though only the chorus is in Chinese.

== Composition ==
"So Crazy marks the first collaboration between T-ara and hit composer Brave Brothers, who previously produced Hyomin's solo debut track, "Nice Body". The song is a vibrant, funky dance track characterized by its catchy brass sound. The group also released a Chinese version of the song, though only the chorus is in Chinese.

== Creative direction ==
T-ara members revealed that they were given a choice between "So Crazy" and "1.2.3", an unreleased song produced by Shinsadong Tiger. Ultimately, "So Crazy" was selected as the title track for their album So Good, while "1.2.3" was introduced as the opening song for the group's web drama Sweet Temptation. Eun-jung shared that they opted for an exciting, funky rhythm, complemented by dynamic choreography to capture the vibrant energy of summer. Soyeon, the group's main vocalist, named the key dance move the "Ice Cream Choreography", it represents the feeling of fanning oneself in the heat, followed by the surprise of having ice poured over to cool down, resulting in an expressive reaction like, "Oh, it's cold. It's cool". The song’s working title was originally "Totally Crazy", but it was eventually finalized as "So Crazy" to better suit its playful vibe. The choreography for "So Crazy" was created by Yama & Hotchicks dance studio, known for their work on several of T-ara's previous hits, including "Bo Peep Bo Peep", "You're Driving Me Crazy" and "Roly Poly".

In an interview reported by News Fim, Soyeon described Brave Brothers as a cheerful and lively individual who fosters a positive, fun atmosphere during recording sessions. She added that despite his bright demeanor, he is a perfectionist, known for his meticulous and detail-oriented approach to music production. Hyomin highlighted his potential to play a significant role in T-ara's future projects, while Eun-jung likened his influence to that of a teacher.

== Music videos ==
=== Background and release ===
A teaser video for "So Crazy" was released on August 1, 2015, at midnight through official fan cafe. The official music video was subsequently released on August 4, 2015, on MBK Entertainment’s YouTube channel. It featured the South Korean comedian Park Na-rae and was directed by Hong Won-ki, who previously collaborated with T-ara on notable music videos such as "Number Nine", "I Know The Feeling", "Do You Know Me?", "Hide & Seek", and most recently, "Sugar Free". To cater to their international audience, a Chinese version of the music video was also released on August 12, 2015, on MBK Entertainment's YouTube channel. In this version, only the chorus was translated into Chinese.

=== Synopsis ===
The music video for the song features all T-ara members and comedian Park Na-rae. In "So Crazy," six cafeteria workers, played by T-ara, are overlooked and mistreated by sailors who admire a popular woman. Seeking change, they join a modeling competition, win, and rise to fame. Gaining confidence, they dismiss the sailors' attention, as a sign of self-confidence and transformation.

=== Critical reception ===
The music video received widespread acclaim, with Billboard highlighting it as a fun and captivating experience. Additionally, it was chosen as the best K-pop music video of 2015 by Fuse Music. In 2019, the music video was selected as one of T-ara's best by Vietnamese magazine SaoStar.

=== Commercial performance ===
The music video for "So Crazy" soared to the top of YinYueTai's Realtime Chart, China's leading video streaming platform. It maintained its success later by clinching the number one spot on the weekly chart for four consecutive weeks. It scored 100% on the platform. Notably, it achieved a perfect score of 100% on the platform, a first for a South Korean female artist. On YouTube, the music video surpassed 1 million views in less than 2 days.

== Promotion and live performances ==
T-ara kicked off the promotion for their album with a release showcase on August 3, 2015, just a day before the album's official release. During the event, the group performed "So Crazy", alongside the rest of the album's tracks and a hit medley. The showcase attracted 120 local and international fans and was met with praise, with Segyo Ilbo highlighting the group's fresh transformation since their previous comeback and the overall concept. T-ara also appeared on 1theK's web show Let's Dance, where they provided a dance tutorial for "So Crazy" and later performed the song on the show.

The group continued their promotion on South Korean music shows, including SBS's Inkigayo, and The Show, MBC's Show! Music Core and KBS's Music Bank, starting on August 7, 2015. In addition, T-ara showcased "So Crazy" at several notable events, such as the 2015 Hallyu Dream Concert on September 20, 2015, the 2015 East Asia New Media Forum on October 18, the 2015 Hallyu Center Awards on November 25, 2015, and Mnet's special concert M Countdown in China on June 2, 2016. The song went on to become a staple in T-ara's setlist for T-ara tours and concerts, including tours for the T-ara Great China Tour. In China, the group even performed the Chinese version of the song.

Additionally, in 2015, "So Crazy" was covered by the Kenyan representative on 2015 Quiz On Korea, an annual competition show hosted by The Ministry of Foreign Affairs.

== Reception ==
=== Commercial performance ===
"So Crazy" peaked at number 33 on the Gaon Weekly Digital Chart and debuted at number one Gaon Social Chart, where it remained for 55 weeks. The song also reached number seventeen on Gaon Sales Chart, selling 177,000 digital copies by the end of August. In China the song topped YinYueTai, the country's largest streaming platform, for 4 weeks, holding the top spot for four consecutive weeks.

=== Critical reception ===
"So Crazy" received generally positive reviews from critics. Billboard highlighted the song as a bold shift for T-ara, showcasing their embrace of a funk-pop style, a departure from their previous Big-room EDM single "Sugar Free", which was released in both Korean and English. The track was noted for featuring elements reminiscent of Brave Brothers' past work, with influences from 4Minute’s "What’s Your Name" and AOA's "Miniskirt", yet it stood out as a fun and funky dance track in its own right. News Fim praised T-ara's transformation, noting how they shed excessive retro and trot style to adopt a fresher sound. The song was chosen as the ninth-best K-pop song of 2015 by Idolator. In 2017, Jeff Benjamin of SBS PopAsia included it in his list of the best T-ara singles. The project’s concepts and outfits were also celebrated for their influence on K-pop fashion. Several critics regarded the sailor-inspired outfits as revolutionary, with Glamour UK naming them one of the greatest fashion moments in K-Pop history in 2019. Money Today further praised the stage outfits, emphasizing the navy and white uniforms reminiscent of marine girls, which became a signature look for the era.

== Accolades ==
=== Awards and nominations ===
Award ceremony	Year	Category	Nominee / work		Ref.
V Chart Awards	2015	Artists of the Year	"So Crazy"	Nominated	
V Chart Awards	2015	Group of the Year	"So Crazy"	Won	

=== Listicles ===
Year	Publisher	List	Recipient	Placement	Ref.
2015	Idolator	Best K-Pop Songs of 2015	"So Crazy"	9th	
2015	Fuse Music	K-Pop Top 40 Music Videos of 2015	"So Crazy"	1st	
2017	SBS PopAsia	Nine of the best T-ara singles	"So Crazy"	9th	
2021	Glamour UK	23 of the greatest fashion moments in K-Pop history	"So Crazy"	19th	

== Charts ==
Chart (2015)	Peak position
South Korea (Gaon Digital Chart)	33

== Sales ==
Sales as of October 2014
Country	Sales amount	Ref.
South Korea (Gaon)	120,000 (Digital downloads)	

== Release history ==
Country	Date	Album	Distributing label	Format
South Korea	August 4, 2015	So Good	MBK Entertainment, Interpark Music	Digital download
Worldwide	August 4, 2015	So Good	MBK Entertainment, Interpark Music	Digital download
