= T-ara Single Complete Best Album "Queen of Pops" =

- Diamond ver. cover

Greatest hits album by T-ara
- Released: July 2, 2014
- Recorded: 2011–14
- Genre: Dance-pop, electropop
- Label: EMI Music Japan

T-ara Japanese chronology
Gossip Girls (2014)	T-ara Single Complete Best Album "Queen of Pops" (2014)	And & End (2014)

T-ara Single Complete Best Album "Queen of Pops" (stylized as T-ARA Single Complete BEST ALBUM "Queen of Pops") is the second greatest hits album by South Korean girl group T-ara. It was released on July 2, 2014 by EMI Music Japan. The album contains all of T-ara's Japanese singles released up to their third and final Japanese album, Gossip Girls, including the sub-unit QBS's single "Kaze no Yō ni", as well as other tracks that T-ara had recorded for their three previous Japanese albums.

== Formats ==
The album includes two separate discs, a "Japanese Single Collection" containing the group's Japanese singles, and a "Anthem Song Collection" that contains notable tracks off of their three Japanese albums. The album was released with three separate editions; a diamond edition that contains the two collections and a randomized piece of any T-ara member's costume as memorabilia, a sapphire edition that only contains the two collections, and a pearl edition that only contains the "Japanese Single Collection".

A DVD/Blu-ray version of the compilation album was released a week earlier called T-ARA Single Complete Best Music Clips "Queen of Pops", containing a compilation of the group's Japanese music videos.

== Track listing ==
Japanese Single Collection: (All songs are their respective Japanese version)
No.	Title	Lyrics	Producer(s)	Length
1.	"Bo Peep Bo Peep"	Shinsadong Tiger, Choi Kyu-sung, Zoop	Shinsadong Tiger, Choi Kyu-sung
2.	"yayaya"	E-Tribe, Fujino Takafumi	E-Tribe, Jang Jun-ho
3.	"Roly-Poly"	Shinsadong Tiger, Choi Kyu-sung, Shoko Fujibayashi	Shinsadong Tiger, Choi Kyu-sung
4.	"Lovey-Dovey"	Shinsadong Tiger, Choi Kyu-sung, Shoko Fujibayashi	Shinsadong Tiger, Choi Kyu-sung
5.	"Sexy Love"	Shinsadong Tiger, Choi Kyu-sung, Seiko Fujibayashi	Shinsadong Tiger, Choi Kyu-sung
6.	"Bunny Style!" (バニスタ！)	Inoue Tomonori, MEG.ME	MEG.ME
7.	"TARGET"	MEG.ME	KOH
8.	"Kioku ~Kimi ga Kureta Michishirube~" (記憶 ~君がくれた道標(みちしるべ)~)	Kiyosumi Ida, Osamu Onomiyaichi	Kiyosumi Ida
9.	"Number Nine"	Shinsadong Tiger, Choi Kyu-sung	Shinsadong Tiger, Choi Kyu-sung
10.	"Lead the way"	Okochi Kouta, Ono Miyaichi Osamu	Okochi Kouta
11.	"LA'booN"	Fujibayashi Shoko	MEG.ME
12.	"Kaze no Yō ni" (風のように) (QBS)	Fukuda Satoshi	Ikuta Magokoro

Anthem Song Collection:
No.	Title	Lyrics	Producer(s)	Length
1.	"Asonde Miru?" (Wanna Play?) (遊んでみる?)		Kim Tae-hyun, Cho Young-soo
2.	"LOVE ME! ~Anata no Sei de Kurui Sou~" (あなたのせいで狂いそう)	Onomiya Ichino, Zoop	Cho Young-soo, Kim Tae-hyun
3.	"Wae Ireoni" (ウェイロニ) (Why Are You Being Like This?)	Ikuta Magokoro	Kim Do-hoon, Lee Sang-ho
4.	"Apple is A"	Ahn Young-min, Shoko Fujibayashi	Cho Young-soo
5.	"Kojinmaru ～Uso～" (コジンマル～嘘～) (Lies)	Shinsadong Tiger, Choi Kyu-sung, Seiko Fujibayashi	Shinsadong Tiger, Choi Kyu-sung
6.	"T.T.L ～Time to Love～"	HI-D	Kim Do-hoon
7.	"Breaking Heart ~ Watashi ga Totemo Itakute" (私がとても痛くて) (I'm in Pain)	Fujino Takafumi	Shinsadong Tiger, Choi Kyu-sung
8.	"DAY BY DAY"	Makiko	Cho Young-soo, Kim Tae-hyun
9.	"Cry Cry"	Onomiya Ichino	Cho Young-soo, Kim Tae-hyun
10.	"Hajimete no You ni" (初めてのように) (Like the First Time)	Hazama Tomoko	"Hitman" Bang
11.	"Bye Bye"	Ono Miyaichi Osamu	Nam Gi-sang
12.	"Watashi, Doushiyou" (私、どうしよう) (Do You Know Me)	Polar Bear, Shinsadong Tiger	Polar Bear, Shinsadong Tiger

== Release history ==
Region	Date	Label	Format	Catalog
Japan	July 2, 2014	EMI Music Japan	CD	UPCH-29173 (Diamond)
Japan	July 2, 2014	EMI Music Japan	CD	UPCH-20366 (Sapphire)
Japan	July 2, 2014	EMI Music Japan	CD	UPCH-20359 (Pearl)
