= List of Kakao M labels =

This is a list of labels controlled, distributed or associated with Kakao Entertainment.

== Subsidiaries ==
=== House labels ===
==== BLUEDOT Entertainment ====
BLUEDOT Entertainment was established by Kakao M (formerly known as LOEN Entertainment) to manage their newest boygroup Just B that debuted on June 30, 2021. It is their first boy group to be launched after The Boyz who debuted in 2017.

==== EDAM Entertainment ====
EDAM Entertainment was established by Kakao M to manage their long-time soloist IU in 2020. The name EDAM (이담) is the reverse word of "Made" and stands for 이 다음 (E-da-um = the next), bringing the meaning of reversing the obvious ideas to make the next things go beyond times. On July 5, 2021, actress Shin Se-kyung signed with the label until her departure on July 3, 2024. On October 25, 2022, singer Woodz signed with the label.

=== Independent labels ===
==== Starship Entertainment ====
Starship Entertainment is an entertainment company founded by Kim Shi-dae in 2008. In 2013, Kakao M (formerly LOEN Entertainment) acquired 70% shares of Starship, became a majority owner of the label and making Starship as an independent subsidiary of Kakao M. In the same year, Starship announced its first subsidiary label "Starship X", which rapper Mad Clown was signed under. In 2015, King Kong Entertainment was acquired by Starship. In 2017, upon the merger of the businesses of the two companies, the company was relaunched as "King Kong by Starship". In the same year, Starship launched another subsidiary label House of Music, which focused on recruiting smaller, independent artists, with artist MoonMoon being the first signed under the label. In 2018, Starship renamed the label "Highline Entertainment".

==== Mun Hwa In ====
Mun Hwa In is an independent record label established by Kakao M (formerly LOEN Entertainment) in June 2016. It is currently being co-distributed by Kakao Entertainment and Mirrorball Music.

Groups

- Hanumpa
- AISLE
- Hey Men
- Bandage

Duos

- CRACKER
- ANTS
- Everlua
- Long:D

Soloists

- Lena Park
- OOHYO
- Yoon Hyun-sang
- Youra
- Aleph
- Rosy
- Minchae
- KREAM
- I.NA
- Youngman
- JAENEY
- glowingdog

Studio artists

- Yoon Hyun-sang
- KREAM
- Youngman
- glowingdog
- CRACKER
- the night of Seokyo
- Collective Arts

==== High Up Entertainment ====
High Up Entertainment, also simply known as High Up, is a South Korean entertainment agency founded by producer duo Black Eyed Pilseung, in partnership with CJ E&M, in 2017. On June 10, 2021, it was announced that Kakao Entertainment had acquired High Up Entertainment after becoming their largest shareholder, and therefore would become a Kakao Entertainment subsidiary.

== Former subsidiaries ==
=== Cantabile ===
Cantabile was a record label under Seoul Records (now LOEN Entertainment), founded in April 1991. It was the first record label in South Korea.

=== Avent ===
Avent was also a record label under Seoul Records, founded in April 2002.

=== Collabodadi Label ===
Collabodadi Label was also an in-house label of LOEN Entertainment (now Kakao M), founded in September 2013. It was led by Shinsadong Tiger. Prior to being chosen to lead the label, he produced the K-pop hits "Bo Peep Bo Peep" (T-ara), "Hot Issue" (4Minute), "U&I" (Ailee) and more.

The name Collabodadi (콜라보따리) is a portmanteau of 콜라보 (collabo - collaboration) and 보따리 (boddari - package).

In September 2015, the label's artists Fiestar and Zia were moved back to LOEN Tree (now known as Fave Entertainment).

=== WS Entertainment ===
WS Entertainment was a joint venture between Warner Music Korea, SK-KTB Music Investment Fund, and Seoul Records (now LOEN Entertainment). It was founded in 2006 and currently led by Philip Oh. The initial WS stands for Warner Music and SK Telecom.

=== E&T Story Entertainment ===
E&T Story Entertainment was founded on December 26, 2017, by Kakao M (formerly LOEN Entertainment) as a one-person agency of actress Kim So-hyun and led by Park Chan-woo. As January 2018, Play M Entertainment acquired 60% of E&T Story Entertainment shares.

=== IST Entertainment ===
IST Entertainment is a record label established by Kakao M in November 2021. The label (previously known as Play M Entertainment) was established with the merger of Plan A Entertainment and FAVE Entertainment in April 2019. On November 1, 2021, Play M Entertainment merged with Cre.ker Entertainment. The agency currently houses the group ATBO. On February 5, 2025, Beyond Music fully acquired the label and will be incorporating it as a subsidiary.

== Former artists ==
=== Former recording artists ===
- Run
- Park Ji-yoon (1997–1999)
- Gain (2011–2013)
- Sunny Hill (2011–2017)
- Fiestar (2012–2018)
  - Cheska (2012–2014)
  - Jei (2012–2018)
  - Linzy (2012–2018)
  - Hyemi (2012–2018)
  - Yezi (2012–2018)
  - Cao Lu (2012–2018)
- History (2013–2017)
  - Song Kyung-il (2013–2019)
  - Na Do-kyun (2013–2019)
  - Kim Si-hyoung (2013–2019)
  - Kim Jae-ho (2013–2019)
  - Jang Yi-jeong (2013–2019)
- Shin Zisu (2015–2016)
- I.B.I (2016)
- JBJ (2017–2018)
- Melody Day (2012–2018)
- Seenroot (Munhwa In, 2013–2019)

=== Former actors ===
- Kim Suk-hoon
- Jo Han-sun
- Lee Jung-hyuk
- Kang Bok-eum

== Distribution network ==
=== Current ===
- Amoeba Culture (with CJ E&M)
- Around Us Entertainment
- Brand New Music (with Warner Music Korea)
- Brave Entertainment (with CJ E&M)
- C-JeS Entertainment
- Choon Entertainment
- Coridel Entertainment
- Cube Entertainment
- DI Entertainment
- DIMA Entertainment
- DSP Media (excluding Click-B, whose distribution rights are handled by CJ E&M)
- Eru Entertainment
- FNC Entertainment
- High Up Entertainment (with Genie Music)
- Happy Face Entertainment (with Genie Music)
- iHQ (with Universal Music Korea)
- Jellyfish Entertainment (excluding VERIVERY, whose distribution rights are handled by CJ E&M)
- Jin-ah Entertainment
- KBS Media (for Immortal Songs 2 compilation albums)
- KeyEast (excluding Kim Hyun-joong, whose distribution rights are handled by CJ E&M)
- Music K Entertainment
- Leessang Company
- Maroo Entertainment (with NHN Entertainment)
- MBK Entertainment (with Interpark)
- Music&NEW
- Music Farm
- Mystic Story (with Dreamus)
- NH Media (with TSN Company)
- Nega Network
- Polaris Entertainment (with KMP Holdings, Genie Music and CJ E&M)
- SBS Contents Hub (for K-pop Star compilation albums)
- Sniper Sound (with Pony Canyon Korea)
- SidusHQ
- Soul Shop Entertainment
- SS Entertainment
- SuneV
- TOP Media
- TS Entertainment
- Ulala Company
- Imagine Asia
- Dream T Entertainment (acquired in 2013)
- Cashmere Records (acquired in 2014)
- Duble Kick Entertainment (acquired in 2014)
- YMC Entertainment (acquired in 2015)
- Woollim Entertainment (with Dreamus)

=== Former ===
- B2M Entertainment
- BlockBerry Creative
- Hybe Corporation (formerly Big Hit Entertainment)
  - Big Hit Music
  - KOZ Entertainment
  - Pledis Entertainment
  - Source Music
- iMBC (for Star Audition: Birth of a Great Star compilation albums) (2011-2013)
- J. Tune Camp
- JYP Entertainment
- Lion Media (formerly Stam Entertainment)
- MLD Entertainment
- Open World Entertainment (2006-2012)
- RUI Entertainment
- Stardom Entertainment
- Star Empire Entertainment (2011-2015)
- Starkim Entertainment (formerly Startory Entertainment)
- Trophy Entertainment
- Vitamin Entertainment (2006-2007) (acquired by Warner Music Korea)
- Vine Entertainment
- WM Entertainment
- Yamazone Music

== See also ==
- LOEN Entertainment
