= Ah Yeah (EP) =

EP by EXID
- Released: April 13, 2015
- Recorded: 2014–15
- Genres: Hip hop; R&B
- Length: 28:46
- Language: Korean
- Labels: Yedang; Sony Music
- Producer: Shinsadong Tiger

EXID chronology
Hippity Hop (2012)	Ah Yeah (2015)	Street (2016)

Singles from Ah Yeah
- 1. "Up & Down" Released: August 27, 2014; 2. "Ah Yeah" Released: April 13, 2015

Music video
- "Up & Down" on YouTube "Ah Yeah" on YouTube

Ah Yeah (stylized in all caps) is the second extended play by South Korean girl group EXID. It was released on April 13, 2015 by Yedang Entertainment and distributed by Sony Music. The EP was supported by two singles: "Up & Down", which served as the lead single, and the title track "Ah Yeah", which was released as a follow-up single to the former.

"Ah Yeah" music video

== Background and release ==
On March 4, 2015, Star News reported that Exid was working on a new song, scheduled for release in the second week of April, but it was undecided whether the song would be released as a single or with a mini-album. On April 3, the album's cover art and tracklist were leaked online, prompting Yedang to issue a statement the following day that the company would take legal action if the leak harmed the success of the group's comeback.

Exid held a showcase at Noon Square in Myeongdong on April 12, where they performed "Ah Yeah" for the public for the first time.

As of October 2015, the album has sold over 18,000 copies in South Korea, and 7,000 copies in Japan.

== Composition ==
The album was composed by Shinsadong Tiger, who has been the group's producer since their debut. Member LE also participated in the album's production, co-writing and composing all the songs on the album. The title track, "Ah Yeah", is a hip-hop style dance song with a repetitive hook. "Pat Pat" is described as an "urban R&B" song and "With Out U" as an "urban dance" song. The album also includes their previous single "Up & Down" as well as a new version of "Every Night."

The first single made headlines for its belated chart run — after initial mediocre success, the song started charting three months after its debut. The late success of the single was attributed to a fan-cam video of member Hani performing the song, which went viral across Korean social media networks in late November.

== Track listing ==
CD/digital download
No.	Title	Lyrics	Music	Arrangement	Length
1.	"Ah Yeah" (아예; Aye)	Shinsadong Tiger, Namking Nang, LE	Shinsadong Tiger, Namking Nang, LE	Shinsadong Tiger	3:19
2.	"A Sul Hae" (아슬해)	Shinsadong Tiger, Polar Bear, LE	Shinsadong Tiger, Polar Bear, LE	Shinsadong Tiger, Polar Bear	3:32
3.	"Todak Todak" (토닥토닥)	LE	Shinsadong Tiger, LE	Shinsadong Tiger, LE	3:51
4.	"Without U"	LE	LE, S. Kim	Shinsadong Tiger, S. Kim	3:31
5.	"1M"	Shinsadong Tiger, Monster Factory, LE	Shinsadong Tiger, Monster Factory	Shinsadong Tiger, Monster Factory	3:51
6.	"Up & Down" (위아래; Wiarae)	Shinsadong Tiger, Namking Nang, LE	Shinsadong Tiger, Namking Nang, LE	Shinsadong Tiger	3:09
7.	"Every Night (Version 2)" (매일 밤; Maeil Bam)	LE	Shinsadong Tiger, LE	Shinsadong Tiger	4:14
8.	"Ah Yeah" (Instrumental)		Shinsadong Tiger, Namking Nang, LE	Shinsadong Tiger	3:19
Total length:					28:46

== Charts ==
=== Weekly charts ===
Chart (2015)	Peak position
South Korean Albums (Gaon)	5
Japanese Albums (Oricon)	272
US World Albums (Billboard)	12

=== Monthly charts ===
Chart (2015)	Peak position
South Korean Albums (Gaon)	10

== Awards and nominations ==
=== Annual music awards ===
Year	Award	Category	Recipient	Result
2015	24th Seoul Music Awards	Bonsang (Main Prize)	EXID	Won
2015	24th Seoul Music Awards	High1/Mobile Popularity Award	EXID	Nominated
2015	24th Seoul Music Awards	Hallyu Special Award	EXID	Nominated
2015	4th Gaon Chart K-Pop Awards	Discovery of the Year - 2014	EXID	Won

=== Music program awards ===
Song	Program	Date
"Up & Down"	M! Countdown (Mnet)	January 8, 2015
"Up & Down"	M! Countdown (Mnet)	January 15, 2015
"Up & Down"	Music Bank (KBS)	January 9, 2015
"Up & Down"	Music Bank (KBS)	January 16, 2015
"Up & Down"	Inkigayo (SBS)	January 11, 2015
"Up & Down"	The Show (SBS MTV)	January 13, 2015
"Ah Yeah"	The Show (SBS MTV)	April 21, 2015
"Ah Yeah"	Inkigayo (SBS)	April 26, 2015
"Ah Yeah"	Inkigayo (SBS)	May 3, 2015
"Ah Yeah"	Show Champion (MBC Music)	April 29, 2015
"Ah Yeah"	Show Champion (MBC Music)	May 6, 2015

== Release history ==
Region	Date	Format	Label
South Korea	April 13, 2015	CD, digital download	Yedang Entertainment; Sony Music
Worldwide	April 14, 2015	Digital download	Yedang Entertainment
