= And & End =

EP by T-ara
- Released: September 11, 2014
- Recorded: 2014
- Genres: K-pop; EDM
- Length: 23:38
- Language: Korean
- Labels: Core Contents; KT Music

T-ara chronology
T-ara Single Complete Best Album "Queen of Pops" (2014)	And & End (2014)	So Good (2015)

Singles from And & End
- 1. "Sugar Free" Released: September 11, 2014

Music video
- Sugar Free on YouTube

And & End is the sixth extended play (Note: Titled the tenth mini album by the group's record label.) by South Korean girl group T-ara, which was released on September 11, 2014, by Core Contents Media. It featured "Sugar Free" as the lead single.

== Release ==
On August 6, 2014, it was revealed that the group would be returning with a new album the following month, with their label later confirming a mid-September release date. The title track, "Sugar Free", is an electronic dance music (EDM)-inspired song of the Big room genre and was produced by Shinsadong Tiger, who had worked with the group on previous releases including "Roly-Poly", "Lovey-Dovey", and "Number 9", and Beom & Nang. The choreography for "Sugar Free" was created by Yama & Hotchicks dance studio, known for their work on several of T-ara's previous hits, including "Bo Peep Bo Peep", "You're Driving Me Crazy" and "Roly Poly".

=== EDM Club Sugar Free Edition ===
EDM Club Sugar Free Edition is the second remix album by South Korean girl group T-ara, which was released on September 24, 2014. The album consisted of a total of 18 tracks; all remixes of "Sugar Free" in Korean and English. The original version of the song featuring LE of EXID was also included on the album.

On October 9, a representative of T-ara said, "We only released a limited edition of the EDM Edition album of 7,000 copies, but fans in Southeast Asia Ordered nearly 20,000 copies. We are very surprised and grateful for the interest of the fans, as this album was planned to be a limited release only, we decided not to release any more."

== Reception ==
=== Critical reception ===
"Sugar Free" received generally positive reviews. Scott Interrante of PopMatters praised the song's synths use and the "saccharine and overly processed" vocals "Sugar-Free is as good as one could hope it to be". "ORGR", a side-track from the EP was chosen as the 10th best T-ARA song by NME describing it as ahead of its time for its infusion of dance-pop, nu-disco and electropop which "pair beautifully with T-ARA’s vocal range and soulful tones". "Sugar Free" ranked at No. 7 on the same list highlighting its success at becoming a staple in clubs all over Asia.

=== Commercial performance ===
And & End debuted at number two on the Gaon Album Chart for the week of September 7, 2014. In the United States, the album debuted at number 12 on the Billboard World Albums chart. As of December 2014, the album has sold 20,677 copies. On May 19, 2016, YinYueTai announced Top 15 MVs with the most views on YinYueTai. In this list, T-ara ranked first and second with two music videos " Number Nine " (133 million views) and "Sugar Free" (122.8 million views).

== In popular culture ==
On February 5, 2016, "Sugar Free" (Big Room Ver.) was added to Japanese game NEON FM's playlist as well as Pump It Up Prime 2's song list in 2014 and later again in 2016.

== Track listing ==
No.	Title	Lyrics	Music	Length
1.	"Sugar Free"	Shinsadong Tiger, LE (EXID)	Shinsadong Tiger & LE (EXID)	3:55
2.	"ORGR"	4th Hitter, S.Kim	4th Hitter, S.Kim	2:58
3.	"I Don't Want You" (남주긴 아까워; Namjugin Akkawo)	Duble Sidekick	Duble Sidekick, Radio Galaxi	2:58
4.	"Last Calendar" (지난 달력; Jinan Dallyeog)	Roco (Rocoberry)	Rocoberry	2:47
5.	"If I See Her" (그녀를 보면; Geunyeoreul Bomyeon)	Rocoberry	Conan	3:10
6.	"Sugar Free" (Instrumental)	Shinsadong Tiger, LE (EXID)	Shinsadong Tiger	3:55
Total length:				23:38

Digital version
No.	Title	Lyrics	Music	Length
1.	"Sugar Free" (BigRoom Version)	Shinsadong Tiger, LE (EXID)	Shinsadong Tiger	3:55
2.	"Sugar Free"	Shinsadong Tiger, LE (EXID)	Shinsadong Tiger, LE (EXID)	3:55
3.	"I Don't Want You" (남주긴 아까워; Namjugin Akkawo)	Duble Sidekick	Duble Sidekick, Radio Galaxi	2:58
4.	"ORGR"	4th Hitter, S.Kim	4th Hitter, S.Kim	2:58
5.	"Last Calendar" (지난 달력; Jinan Dallyeog)	Roco (Rocoberry)	Rocoberry	2:47
6.	"If I See Her" (그녀를 보면; Geunyeoreul Bomyeon)	Conan, Roco	Conan	3:10
7.	"Sugar Free" (BigRoom Version Instrumental)	Shinsadong Tiger, LE (EXID)	Shinsadong Tiger	3:55

== Accolades ==
Awards and nominations
Award ceremony	Year	Category	Nominee / work	Result	Ref.
MTV Best of the Best Awards	2014	Best Dance Video	"Sugar Free"	Won	
Seoul Music Awards	2015	Hallyu Special Award	And & End	Nominated	
Seoul Music Awards	2015	Main Prize (Bonsang)	And & End	Nominated	
Seoul Music Awards	2015	Popularity Award	And & End	Nominated	

Rankings
Year	Publisher	List	Recipient	Ranking	Ref.
2014	Kenh14	Top 14 K-Pop Girl Group Girl Crush songs	"Sugar Free"	12th	
2017	SBS PopAsia	9 of the best T-ara singles	"Sugar Free"	8th	
2024	NME	The 10 best T-ARA songs	"Sugar Free"	7th	
2024	NME	The 10 best T-ARA songs	"ORGR"	10th	

== Charts ==
=== Weekly charts ===
Chart	Peak position
South Korean Albums (Gaon)	2
US World Albums (Billboard)	12

=== Year-end charts ===
Chart	Position
South Korean Albums (Gaon)	78

== Sales ==
Sales for And & End
Country	Sales amount
South Korea	20,677

== Release history ==
Region	Album	Date	Format	Label
South Korea	And & End	September 11, 2014	CD, digital download	Core Contents Media / KT Music
Various	And & End	September 11, 2014	Digital download	Core Contents Media / KT Music
South Korea	EDM Club Sugar Free Edition	September 24, 2014	CD, digital download	Core Contents Media / KT Music
Various	EDM Club Sugar Free Edition	September 24, 2014	Digital download	Core Contents Media / KT Music
