= Gossip Girls (T-ara album) =

Studio album by T-ara
- Released: May 14, 2014
- Recorded: 2013–14
- Genre: J-pop; dance-pop; electropop
- Language: Japanese
- Label: EMI Records Japan

T-ara chronology
Again (2013)	Gossip Girls (2014)	T-ara Single Complete Best Album "Queen of Pops" (2014)

Singles from Gossip Girls
- 1. "Number Nine / Memories: You Gave Me Guidance" Released: November 20, 2013; 2. "Lead the Way/La'boon" Released: March 5, 2014

Gossip Girls is the fourth studio album and third Japanese release by South Korean idol group T-ara. It was released on May 14, 2014, as their second album release under Universal Music Japan sub-label EMI Records Japan in two limited editions and a regular edition.

== Release and promotion ==
Gossip Girls was released in three versions: a CD+DVD+Photobook Edition (Diamond), a CD+DVD Edition (Sapphire), and a CD Only Edition (Pearl). Diamond edition includes a 36-page photobook and all editions come with one enclosed trading card which is randomly chosen out of 7 types.

The album includes five new original Japanese songs: "Just Now", "Lucky Wannabee!", "Keep on Walking", "Knockin' on My Heart", and "Musica Musica". The secret track is the same song "Do You Know Me," originally track #8, played again with some varied lyrics.

== Commercial performance ==
Gossip Girls debuted at number seven on the Oricon Albums Chart, with first-week sales of 10,463 in Japan. In its second week, the album dropped to number 49 and sold 1,467 copies. The album fell out the top 100 in its third week. The album ranked at number 24 on the Oricon Monthly Albums Chart, selling 12,680 copies.

== Singles ==
Two singles have been released prior to the album.

"Number Nine / Memories: You Gave Me Guidance" is the eighth Japanese single and first double A-side single released by T-ara. It was released in four editions: two Limited CD+DVD editions, a regular edition and a Christmas edition. The song "Number Nine" is a Japanese version of the original Korean song, released on their fifth Korean mini album Again. The song "Memories: You Gave Me Guidance" (Japanese: "記憶 ~君がくれた道標(みちしるべ)~") was used as the theme song to the Japanese movie Jinx!!! which member Hyomin starred in. Limited editions come in a special paper jacket, while Christmas edition is packed in a box and comes with a remix album, a DVD, and six "T-ARA Santa ver." rubber keyholders. Regular edition comes with the bonus track "A-ha." All editions come with a trading card with a serial code (one randomly chosen out of 7 types). The Christmas edition was originally to be released along with the other editions, on November 20, but its release was delayed to December 18. The single reached number 13 on the Oricon charts, and charted for 7 weeks.

"Lead the Way / La'boon" is the ninth Japanese single (second double A-side) released by T-ara. It was released in three versions: eight limited CD+DVD editions, one type A, and seven type B (one per member), a box edition, and a regular CD Only edition. Each limited edition B features a DVD with a solo version of "Lead the Way" music video featuring one sole member. The box edition includes all six versions in one DVD and includes a 16-page photobook. All editions include one trading card with a serial code. Limited editions comes in a special package while the regular edition comes in a normal paper case. The single reached number 8 on the Oricon charts, and charted for 5 weeks.

== Track listing ==
All editions
No.	Title	Lyrics	Music	Length
1.	"Just Now"	Tairayoo	Yasuaki Moriya	3:31
2.	"Lucky Wannabee!"	Shoko Fujibayashi	Ahn Youngmin	3:30
3.	"Number Nine" (Japanese ver.)	Shinsadong Tiger, Choi Gyu Sung	Shinsadong Tiger, Choi Gyu Sung	3:48
4.	"Lead the Way"	Okochi Kouta, Ono Miyaichi Osamu	Okochi Kouta	3:59
5.	"Keep on Walking"	MEG.ME	Ogawa Kota	4:02
6.	"Knockin' on My Heart"	MEG.ME	MEG.ME	3:51
7.	"Musica Musica"	Takafumi Fujino	Takafumi Fujino	3:51
8.	"Watashi, Doushiyou" (Japanese ver.) (私、どうしよう, "Do You Know Me")	Polar Bear, Shinsadong Tiger	Polar Bear, Shinsadong Tiger	3:38
9.	"La'boon"	Shoko Fujibayashi	MEG.ME	4:10
10.	"A-ha"	Takafumi Fujino	Takafumi Fujino	4:32
11.	"Kioku ～Kimi ga Kureta Michishirube～" (記憶 ~君がくれた道標(みちしるべ)~, "Memories ~You Gave Me Guidance~")	Kiyosumi Ida, Osamu Onomiyaichi	Kiyosumi Ida	4:25
12.	"T.T.L ～Time to Love～ (DJ Hanmin Remix)" (Japanese ver.)	HI-D	Kim Do-hoon, DJ Hanmin	4:06
13.	"Watashi, Doushiyou Part 2" (Japanese ver.) (Secret Track)	Polar Bear, Shinsadong Tiger	Polar Bear, Shinsadong Tiger	3:38

Diamond edition (DVD)
No.	Title	Length
1.	"T-ARA SPECIAL MOVIE Gossip Girls"

Sapphire edition (DVD)
No.	Title	Length
1.	"Number Nine" (Japanese version)
2.	"Kioku ～Kimi ga Kureta Michishirube～" (Kumazawa Naoto Director Version) (記憶 ~君がくれた道標(みちしるべ)~, "Memories ~You Gave Me Guidance~")
3.	"Lead the Way"
4.	"Lead the Way" (T-ara Lip version)
5.	"Gossip Girls Recording Making Movie"
6.	"Gossip Girls Photo Shooting Making Movie"

== Charts ==
=== Oricon ===
Released	Oricon chart	Peak	Debut sales	Sales total
May 14, 2014	Daily albums chart	3	10,463 (Weekly); 12,680 (Monthly)	13,393
May 14, 2014	Weekly albums chart	7	10,463 (Weekly); 12,680 (Monthly)	13,393
May 14, 2014	Monthly albums chart	24	10,463 (Weekly); 12,680 (Monthly)	13,393
