= 1st Mini Album (Taegoon EP) =

EP by Taegoon
- Released: January 15, 2009
- Genre: K-pop, R&B
- Length: 19:03
- Label: Pony Canyon (KR) (Catalog:PCSD-00293)
- Producer: Crown J, Sound of Strike, Bang Si-hyuk

Taegoon chronology
| 1st Mini Album (2009) | Rising Star (2009) |

Singles from 1st Mini Album
- 1. "Call Me" Released: January 15, 2009

1st Mini Album is the debut mini-album by South Korean singer Taegoon produced by Crown J.

== Singles ==
"Call Me" was the first single to be released from the album. The debut performance was on MBC's show Music Core on January 17, 2009. The video for the song featured Park Shin-hye and TVXQ's Hero Jaejoong.

== Track listing ==
1. Intro
2. Call Me (Feat. Park Shin Hye and Kim Jaejoong)
3. One Two Step
4. My Girl
5. 난 그녈 알아 (Feat. H-유진) ("I Understand You")
6. Hands Up
