= Tri.be =

South Korean girl group

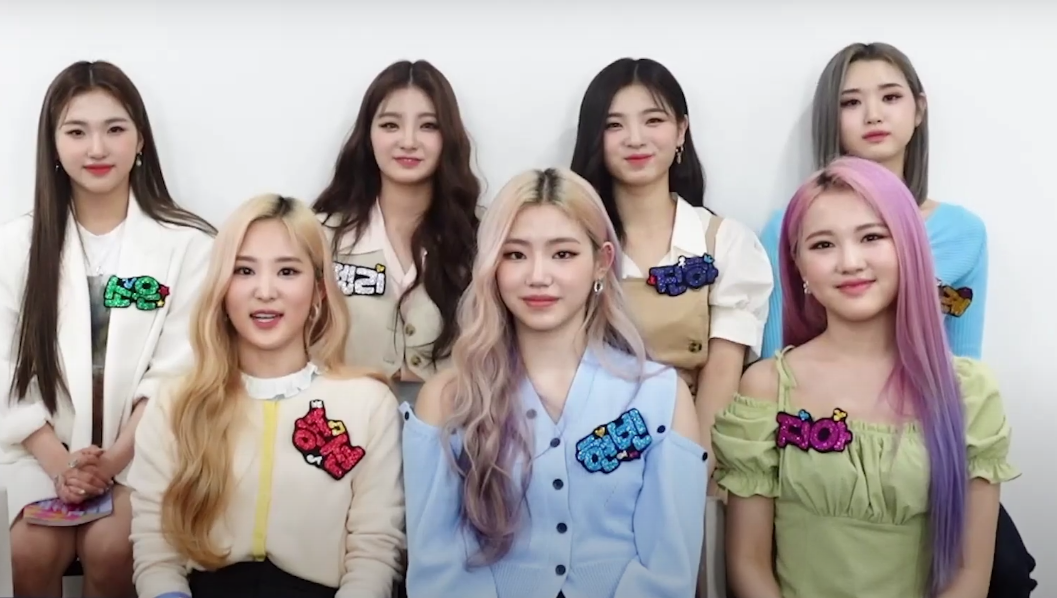
- Tri.be in October 2021; Top, L–R: Soeun, Kelly, Jinha (former), Mire, Bottom, L–R: Songsun, Hyunbin, Jia

Background information
- Origin: Seoul, South Korea
- Genres: K-pop; tropical house; moombahton
- Years active: 2021–2024 (Note: Indefinite hiatus)
- Labels: TR; Republic; Universal
- Members: Songsun; Kelly; Hyunbin; Jia; Soeun; Mire
- Past members: Jinha
- Website: tri-be.kr

Tri.be (/traɪ.bi/; Korean: 트라이비; RR: Teuraibi; stylized as TRI.BE), was a South Korean girl group formed in 2021 by TR Entertainment and Universal Music Group. The group consists of six members: Songsun, Kelly, Hyunbin, Jia, Soeun, and Mire. The group debuted on February 17, 2021, with the release of their debut single album Tri.be Da Loca. Originally as seven members, former member Jinha left the group due to poor physical health reasons.

== Name ==
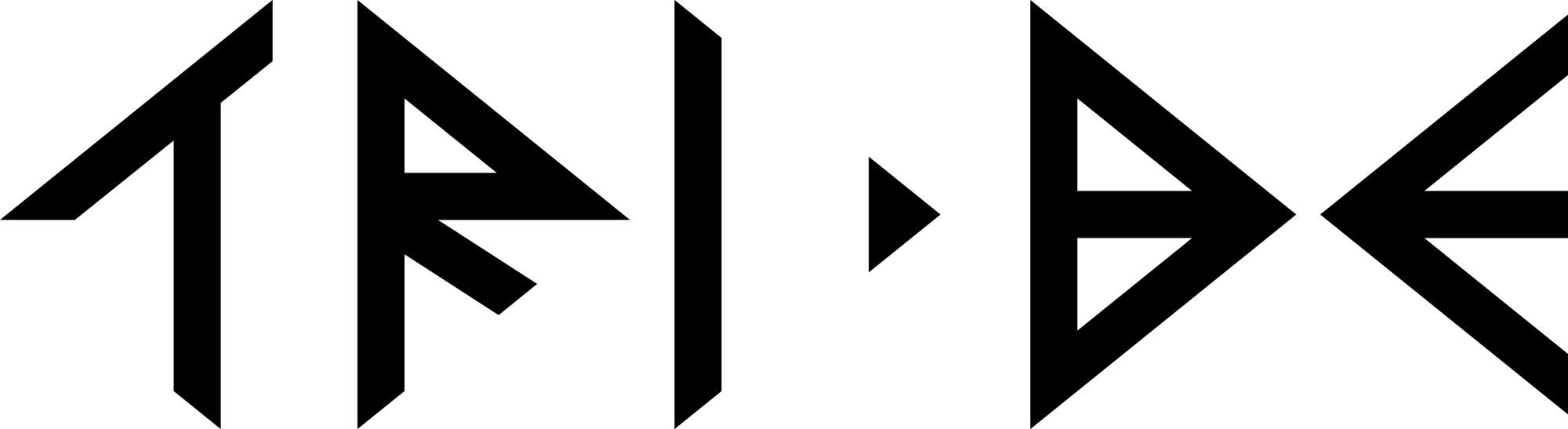
TRI.BE's official logo

Tri.be, is a combination of "Tri", an abbreviation of "Triangle", which is a symbol of perfection, and "Be", which means existence, leading to the meaning of "perfect existence" or "perfect being".

== History ==
=== Pre-debut ===
Songsun and Hyunbin were former trainees under Banana Culture Entertainment, involved in one of the company's projects titled "Banana Culture New Kid".

Kelly was a contestant on the Chinese competition show Youth With You 2 under Tri.be's former pre-debut management company Lion-Heart Entertainment. She was eliminated in the first round and ended up at 64th place.

=== 2020–2022: Preparation, debut and Veni Vidi Vici ===
On December 29, 2020, it was revealed that producer Shinsadong Tiger and Universal Music Group had intentions to debut a new girl group in early 2021. On January 4, 2021, the group's official social media accounts released an official logo motion video, revealing the group's logo and their name to be Tri.be. The group released teaser and promotional videos in early February, later confirming that they will be debuting later that month. Prior to their debut, they were featured in their first online reality show, Let's Try ! Be, on YouTube through Studio Lululala.

They debuted with their first single album Tri.be Da Loca on February 17, 2021, with the lead single "Doom Doom Ta" and its B-side track "Loca". Both songs in the album were produced by Shinsadong Tiger and member Elly of EXID. On the same day as their debut, Tri.be was announced to be signed under Universal Music's subsidiary label Republic Records for promotions outside of Korea. On May 18, they released their second single album titled Conmigo with the lead single "Rub-A-Dum" and its B-side track "Loro".

On October 12, 2021, Tri.be released their first extended play Veni Vidi Vici with the lead single "Would You Run" alongside 4 new tracks and 2 previously released singles "Doom Doom Ta" and "Rub-A-Dum". On November 25, Tri.be released a special winter single titled "Santa For You". On December 2, it was announced Tri.be would be participating in the theme song for Cartoon Network's series We Baby Bears. The song, titled "The Bha Bha Song", was released on December 17, alongside the music video.

=== 2022–present: Leviosa, Jinha's departure, Diamond and management bankruptcy ===
On August 9, 2022, Tri.be released their third single album Leviosa with the lead single "Kiss". On February 14, 2023, Tri.be released their second extended play W.A.Y with the lead single "We Are Young". On July 21, member Jinha left Tri.be due to health problems. On November 28, Tri.be released their winter single album titled The Little Drummer Girls.

On February 20, 2024, Tri.be released their fourth single album Diamond with the lead single of the same name. A performance video for its B-side track "Run" was released two days later. On February 23, Tri.be's producer Shinsadong Tiger was found dead in his recording studio. TR Entertainment subsequently filed for bankruptcy in March 2025.

== Members ==
=== Current members ===
- Songsun (송선)
- Kelly (켈리)
- Hyunbin (현빈)
- Jia (지아)
- Soeun (소은)
- Mire (미레)

=== Past members ===
- Jinha (진하)

== Discography ==
=== Extended plays ===
List of extended plays, showing selected details, selected chart positions, and sales figures
Title	EP details	Peak chart positions	Sales
Title	EP details	KOR	Sales
Veni Vidi Vici	Released: October 12, 2021; Label: TR Entertainment, Universal Music; Formats: CD, digital download; Track listing: 1. "Would You Run" (우주로); 2. "Lobo"; 3. "-18"; 4. "Got Your Back"; 5. "True"; 6. "Doom Doom Ta" (둠둠타); 7. "Rub-A-Dum" (러버덤)	14	KOR: 13,345
W.A.Y	Released: February 14, 2023; Label: TR Entertainment, Universal Music; Formats: CD, digital download; Track listing: 1. "Stay Together"; 2. "We Are Young"; 3. "Witch"; 4. "Wonderland"; 5. "Would You Run (Original ver.)" (우주로)	22	KOR: 20,636

=== Single albums ===
List of single albums, showing selected details, selected chart positions, and sales figures
Title	Album details	Peak chart positions	Sales
Title	Album details	KOR	Sales
Tri.be Da Loca	Released: February 17, 2021; Label: TR Entertainment, Universal Music; Formats: CD, digital download; Track listing: 1. "Loca"; 2. "Doom Doom Ta" (둠둠타)	57	KOR: 1,742
Conmigo	Released: May 18, 2021; Label: TR Entertainment, Universal Music; Formats: CD, digital download; Track listing: 1. "Rub-A-Dum" (러버덤); 2. "Loro"	25	KOR: 4,989
Leviosa	Released: August 9, 2022; Label: TR Entertainment, Universal Music; Formats: CD, digital download; Track listing: 1. "Kiss"; 2. "In the Air (777)"	15	KOR: 16,014
The Little Drummer Girls	Released: November 27, 2023; Label: TR Entertainment, Universal Music; Formats: digital download. streaming; Track listing: 1. "Loro" ft. Elly from EXID; 2. "Papa Noel"	—	—
Diamond	Released: February 20, 2024; Label: TR Entertainment, Universal Music; Formats: CD, digital download; Track listing: 1. "Diamond"; 2. "Run"	26	KOR: 6,951

=== Singles ===
List of singles, showing year released, selected chart positions, and name of the album
Title	Year	Peak position	Album
Title	Year	KOR Down.	Album
"Doom Doom Ta" (둠둠타)	2021	70	Tri.be Da Loca
"Rub-A-Dum" (러버덤)	2021	107	Conmigo
"Would You Run" (우주로)	2021	86	Veni Vidi Vici
"Santa for You"	2021	—	Non-album single
"Kiss"	2022	87	Leviosa
"We Are Young"	2023	43	W.A.Y
"Diamond"	2024	54	Diamond
"—" denotes releases that did not chart or were not released in that region.

=== As featured artist ===
List of singles, showing year released, and name of the album
Title	Year	Album
"Memu Aagamu" (Coke Studio featuring Armaan Malik, Lost Stories, Allu Arjun and Tri.be)	2022	Non album single

=== Promotional singles ===
List of singles, showing year released, and name of the album
Title	Year	Album
"The Bha Bha Song"	2021	We Baby Bears OST

== Videography ==
=== Music videos ===
Title	Year	Director(s)	Ref.
"Doom Doom Ta"	2021	Oroshi (Desert Beagle)	
"Rub-A-Dum"	2021	Hong Jae-hwan (Desert Beagle)	
"Would You Run"	2021	Oroshi (Desert Beagle)	
"The Bha Bha Song"	2021	Lee Seonjin (TOURMALINE)	
"Kiss"	2022	Naive Creative Production	
"Papa Noel"	2023	Unknown	
"Diamond"	2024	Via Production	

== Filmography ==
=== Reality shows ===
Year	Title	Network / Platform	Note(s)	Ref.
2021	Let's Try ! Be	YouTube	Studio Lulu Lala channel Debut reality show	

== Accolades ==
=== Awards and nominations ===
Name of the award ceremony, year presented, category, nominee of the award, and the result of the nomination
Award ceremony	Year	Category	Nominee / Work	Result	Ref.
Asia Artist Awards	2021	Female Idol Group Popularity Award	Tri.be	Nominated	
Asia Model Awards	2022	Rising Star Award	Tri.be	Won	
Brand of the Year Awards	2021	Female Rookie Idol Award	Tri.be	Nominated	
Hanteo Music Awards	2021	Rookie Award – Female Group	Tri.be	Nominated	
Hanteo Music Awards	2023	Blooming Star Award	Tri.be	Won	
Seoul Music Awards	2022	K-wave Popularity Award	Tri.be	Nominated	
Seoul Music Awards	2022	Popularity Award	Tri.be	Nominated	
Seoul Music Awards	2022	Rookie of the Year	Tri.be	Nominated	

=== Listicles ===
Name of publisher, year listed, name of listicle, and placement
Publisher	Year	Listicle	Placement	Ref.
Rolling Stone	2021	The 10 Best K-Pop Debuts of 2021	8th	
