= Hippity Hop =

EP by EXID
- Released: August 13, 2012
- Recorded: 2012
- Genre: K-pop
- Length: 22:24
- Language: Korean
- Label: AB; LOEN
- Producer: Shinsadong Tiger

EXID chronology
Hippity Hop (2012)	Ah Yeah (2015)

Singles from Hippity Hop
- 1. "I Feel Good" Released: August 14, 2012

Hippity Hop is the debut extended play by South Korean girl group EXID. The album marked the first appearance of the group's new line-up. The lead single, "I Feel Good", was written and produced by Shinsadong Tiger.

== Music video ==
A teaser of the music video for "I Feel Good" was released on August 6. The full music video was released on August 14, 2012, along with the EP release.

== Promotions ==
To promote the album, EXID promote the single in various music programs. Promotions of the song "I Feel Good" started on August 17. EXID held their first comeback stage through KBS's Music Bank on August 17, 2012.

== Chart performance ==
In South Korea, "I Feel Good" entered the Gaon Single Chart at number 56 during the week of August 13, 2012. During that week the song was downloaded 57,697 times. "I Feel Good" also appeared in the Gaon Monthly Chart. By the end of August, "I Feel Good" peaked at number 122 on Gaon Monthly Single Chart and had 110,103 downloads sold. By the end of the year 2012, the song was downloaded only 150,000 times.

== Track listing ==
Track list
No.	Title	Lyrics	Music	Arrangement	Length
1.	"Better Together" (하나 보단 둘; Hana Bodan Dul)	Ji-in, Won-taek, LE	Ji-in, Won-taek	Shinsadong Tiger	3:55
2.	"I Feel Good"	Rado, Ye-Yo, LE	Rado, Ye-Yo	Shinsadong Tiger	3:28
3.	"Call" (전화벨; Jeonhwabel)	LE	Shinsadong Tiger, LE	Shinsadong Tiger	3:52
4.	"Think About"	Joker, Kim Tae-joo, LE	Joker, Kim Tae-joo	Shinsadong Tiger	3:43
5.	"Whoz That Girl" (Part 2)	Shinsadong Tiger, Choi Gyu-sung, LE	Shinsadong Tiger, Choi Gyu-sung	Shinsadong Tiger, Issac	3:46
6.	"I Feel Good" (R.Tee Remix)	Rado, Ye-Yo, LE	Rado, Ye-Yo	Shinsadong Tiger, R.Tee	5:00
Total length:					22:24

== Charts ==
Chart	Peak position
Gaon Album Chart	13

=== Sales ===
Chart	Amount
Gaon physical sales	1,500+

== Credits and personnel ==
- Shinsadong Tiger – executive producer co-producing
- Heo Sol-ji – vocals
- Ahn Hee-youn – vocals
- Ahn Hyo-jin – vocals, rap
- Park Jung-hwa – vocals
- Seo Hye-lin – vocals

== Release history ==
Country	Date	Format	Label
South Korea	August 13, 2012	CD, digital download	AB Entertainment
Worldwide	August 13, 2012	Digital download	AB Entertainment
