= Tri.be Da Loca =

- Digital cover

Single album by Tri.be
- Released: February 17, 2021
- Genres: Pop; Future house
- Length: 6:11
- Languages: Korean; English
- Labels: TR; Universal; Republic
- Producer: Shinsadong Tiger

Tri.be chronology
Tri.be Da Loca (2021)	Conmigo (2021)

Singles from Tri.be Da Loca
- 1. "Doom Doom Ta" Released: February 17, 2021

Tri.be Da Loca (stylized as TRI.BE Da Loca) is the debut single album of the South Korean girl group Tri.be. The album was released on 17 February 2021 by TR Entertainment and distributed by Universal Music Group and Republic Records. The single album consists of two tracks which are produced by Shinsadong Tiger and LE.

== Background and composition ==
On 1 February 2022, TR Entertainment announced Tri.be will be making their debut at the end of February. On the same day, the title was revealed to be "Doom Doom Ta". After several teasers were released, the album was released on February 17.

The two-track album features the lead single "Doom Doom Ta" as well as the hip-hop and synth-pop B-side "Loca" and both tracks are about "living independently without caring about what others think", written by Shinsadong Tiger and LE from the girl group EXID. It is primarily a pop record with afrobeat, baile funk and dancehall elements.

== Promotion ==
A press showcase was held at Blue Square Hall in Hannam-dong, and was streamed live on V Live. On the same day of the debut, they signed a contract with Republic Records, a subsidiary label of Universal Music Group, for future international promotions. On February 18, 2021, the group made the debut performance of "Doom Doom Ta" on M Countdown. On February 19, the group performed on Music Bank. On February 20, they performed on Show! Music Core. On February 21, Tri.be performed on Inkigayo and continued to perform on other South Korean music programs as well.

== Commercial performance ==
Tri.be Da Loca peaked at number 57 on Gaon Album Chart. The title track was able to peak at number 76 on the component download chart. After several hours of tracking, "Doom Doom Ta" charted on South Korea's and China's major domestic music sites such as Bugs! and QQ Music.

== Track listing ==
All tracks are written by Shinsadong Tiger, LE.

Tri.be Da Loca track listing
No.	Title	Length
1.	"Loca" (로카)	2:56
2.	"Doom Doom Ta" (둠둠타)	03:15
Total length:		06:11

== Credits and personnel ==
Credits are adopted from MelOn.

=== Studios ===
- 821 Sound – recording, mastering
- Klang Studio – mixing

=== Personnel ===
- TR Entertainment – executive production
- Universal Music – executive production
- LE – lyrics, composing
- Shinsadong Tiger – composing, lyrics, arranging
- Kim Min-hee – recording
- Koo Jung-pil – mixing
- Jang Yu-ra – mixing
- Kwon Nam-woo – mastering

== Accolades ==
Year-end lists
Critic/Publication	List	Work	Rank	Ref.
Dazed	The Best K-Pop Tracks of 2021	"Doom Doom Ta"	18	
Rolling Stone	The 10 Best New K-Pop Debuts of 2021	"Doom Doom Ta"	8	

== Charts ==
Chart performance for Tri.be Da Loca
Chart (2021)	Peak position
South Korean Albums (Gaon)	57

== Release history ==
Release History for Tri.be Da Loca
Region	Date	Format	Label
Various	February 17, 2021	Digital download; streaming	TR; Universal
South Korea	February 17, 2021	CD	TR; Universal
