= Eclipse (EP) =

EP by EXID
- Released: April 10, 2017
- Recorded: 2017
- Genres: R&B; trip hop; EDM
- Length: 20:30
- Language: Korean
- Labels: Banana Culture; Sony Music

EXID chronology
Street (2016)	Eclipse (2017)	Full Moon (2017)

Singles from Eclipse
- 1. "Night Rather Than Day" Released: April 10, 2017

Eclipse is the third extended play by South Korean girl group EXID. It was released by Banana Culture and distributed by Sony Music on April 10, 2017. The album contains six tracks including the lead single "Night Rather Than Day". The album was promoted by EXID as a 4-member group, since main vocalist Solji was recovering from hyperthyroidism with which she was diagnosed in December 2016.

The EP was a commercial success, peaking at number 5 on South Korea's Gaon Album Chart and at number 4 on the US World Albums chart.

== Background and release ==
Initial reports stated that the group was making a comeback in early 2017. However, due to member Solji's hyperthyroidism diagnosis, comeback plans were rescheduled for a spring of 2017 release. Banana Culture confirmed plans for an April comeback with no confirmation date, stating that the members were considering returning as a four-member group.

On March 20, 2017, it was officially announced that the group would be making a comeback as a four-member group with LE, Junghwa, Hani and Hyerin on April 10. An update on member Solji's health confirmed she would extend the halt of her promotions first announced in December 2016. Two days later, it was revealed that the title track was produced by Shinsadong Tiger and member LE. On March 27, the group revealed that their third mini-album would be titled Eclipse and contain six songs, including an instrumental of the title track. From March 30 to April 2, teaser images of the group and members were released. The name “Eclipse” refers to Solji's absence and also alludes to how the full moon will return once Solji rejoins them, as EXID's next EP would be called Full Moon.

Eclipse was released at noon KST on April 10, 2017, through several music portals, including Melon and iTunes for the global market.

== Music video ==
On April 2, 2017, member Hani posted a teaser on her personal Instagram account, revealing a teaser from the music video for "Night Rather Than Day". A day later, the first music video teaser was officially released through the group's official YouTube channel. On April 4, individual teasers were revealed

The music video was released on April 10, 2017, at noon KST. The colorful video features the members struggling through the grind of their daily commute as they long for the nighttime, before finally being able to enjoy themselves at night, as they sing about preferring to have dates during the night rather than the day.

== Promotion ==
EXID held their first comeback stage on SBS MTV's The Show on April 11, 2017, performing "Boy" and "Night Rather Than Day". They continued on MBC Music's Show Champion on April 11, Mnet's M Countdown on April 13 and KBS's Music Bank on April 14.

== Singles ==
"Night Rather Than Day" entered at number 9 on the Gaon Digital Chart for the April 9–15, 2017 chart week with 94,225 downloads sold and 1,719,902 streams. It also debuted at number 70 on Billboard Korea's K-pop Hot 100.

The song made Billboard's "20 Best K-pop Songs of 2017" list at number 8.

== Commercial performance ==
Eclipse entered at number 5 on the Gaon Album Chart on the chart issue dated April 9–15, 2017. It also entered and peaked at number 4 on Billboard's World Albums for the week ending April 29, 2017, as the highest ranking debut of the week. In its second week, the EP placed at number 10.

== Track listing ==
No.	Title	Lyrics	Music	Arrangement	Length
1.	"Boy"	Shinsadong Tiger; LE	Shinsadong Tiger; Jion; LE	Shinsadong Tiger; Jion	3:27
2.	"Night Rather Than Day" (낮보다는 밤)	Shinsadong Tiger; Keebomb; LE	Shinsadong Tiger; Keebomb; LE	Shinsadong Tiger	3:18
3.	"How Why"	Shinsadong Tiger; LE	Shinsadong Tiger; LE	Shinsadong Tiger	3:51
4.	"Milk" (우유; Hani solo)	Monster Factory; EJAE	Monster Factory; MadeBy; EJAE	MadeBy	3:24
5.	"Velvet" (LE solo)	LE	LE; CHITWNMUSIC	Shinsadong Tiger; CHITWNMUSIC	3:12
6.	"Night Rather Than Day inst." (낮보다는 밤)	Shinsadong Tiger; Keebomb; LE	Shinsadong Tiger; Keebomb; LE	Shinsadong Tiger	3:18
Total length:					20:30

== Charts ==
Chart (2016)	Peak position
South Korean Albums (Gaon)	5
US World Albums (Billboard)	4

== Release history ==
Region	Date	Format	Label
South Korea	April 10, 2017	CD, digital download	Banana Culture, Sony Music
Various	April 10, 2017	CD, digital download	Banana Culture
