= Taegoon =

Korean pop singer and dancer (born 1986)

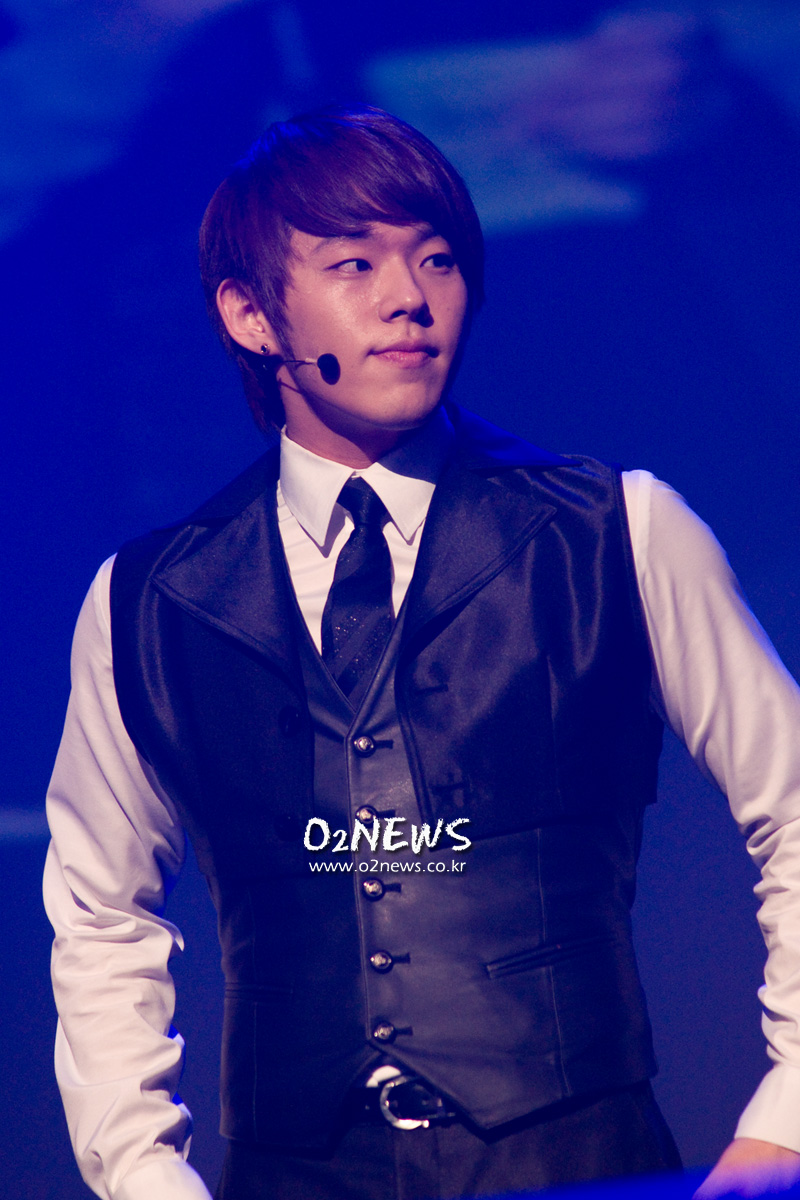
- Taegoon in 2009

Background information
- Born: 김태군; January 17, 1986 (age 40)
- Origin: Gongju, Chungnam, South Korea
- Genres: Pop, R&B, hip-hop
- Occupations: Singer; dancer
- Years active: 2009–2010
- Labels: DMS Communications, Pony Canyon

- Taegoon
- Hangul: 김태군
- RR: Gim Taegun
- MR: Kim T'aegun

Taegoon (born Kim Tae-goon; Korean: 김태군; born January 17, 1986) is a Korean pop singer and dancer. His first television appearance was on the talent search program Battle Shinhwa in 2005. He reached the final round of the competition and was the last one to leave the group. Four years later, after completing hundreds of auditions he was finally able to start a career.

== Biography ==
=== Early life ===
Taegoon was born in Gongju, South Korea, the older of two children. He discovered an interest in dancing and performing when he was only a few years old. Taegoon began dancing as a child and attended an arts-oriented high school. He majored in Dance at Korea National University of Arts, but dropped out to pursue a career in singing. In an attempt to enter the music industry, Taegoon auditioned for the music competition Battle Shinhwa,. Before taking part in the show, he shaved his head, stating in an interview that he wouldn't let his hair grow until he achieved his dream of becoming a singer. While participating in Battle Shinhwa, he developed a special relationship to Kang Won-Rae, one of the judges. After he failed to make it into Battle Shinhwa (now known as Battle), he received a call from Kang Won-Rae who told him that he danced beautifully and that he wanted to get to know him. Together they went to countless auditions, but Taegoon was unsuccessful. He felt ashamed and did not have any further contact with Kang Won-Rae. Taegoon has had difficulties with his fitness level and weight. Most agencies told him he weighed too much, so he lost weight by drinking only water until he lost 20 pounds.

=== Early career ===
Taegoon joined Logi Entertainment and made his debut in January 2009 after failing hundreds of auditions. With production from Sound Of Strike and Bang Si-hyuk, his first mini album was released. He performed for the first time on the January 17, 2009 episode of MBC Show! Music Core. The song was moderately successful, and Taegoon received countless endorsement offers, which is rare for a new singer. He was signed as a model for EXR's Dressed to Kill clothing brand. (In which, Jaejoong of TVXQ-JYJ featured in the music video to help a friend.) While promoting the lead single "Call Me", he was heavily criticized for his heavy use of backup vocals during live performances Because of the difficulties Taegoon was facing at this time, he quickly ended promotions for the album and went back into training. Taegoon's senior in the industry Wheesung learned of the comments about Taegoon's singing skills and offered to help. While training with Wheesung, Taegoon was required to sing Call Me over 1,000 times to improve his abilities. He also had to control the amounts of sleep he got, his diet, and the time he spent rehearsing and report back to Wheesung daily. After the time spent training, Taegoon began to record his next single. As a gift, Wheesung wrote and composed two songs for Taegoon.

=== Growing success and continued releases ===
Shortly after his debut, Taegoon attracted international fans from Thailand, Japan, and other countries. In March 2009, shortly before releasing his second mini album Rising Star, Taegoon held a showcase and fan meeting in Bangkok, Thailand. Because of his album sales in other countries, he started studying the Japanese, Chinese, and English languages. On May 13, 2009, Taegoon released his second mini album, Rising Star. The single chosen for promotion was 슈퍼스타 (Superstar) (feat. 낯선). The single reached similar success to the previous, and the criticism towards his singing abilities had died down. Before ending promotions for the album, a remix version of the song, which sampled "Holiday" by Madonna, was released and promoted for a short time. In July 2009, Taegoon began his foray into Japan by holding his first fan meeting and mini concert in Tokyo which sold out, despite the fact that he had never previously released music or performed there before. Over the summer he continued his activities in both Japan and Korea while preparing for his next release. Shortly before the release of his third mini album, Taegoon held a special event for his Japanese fans and spent one night and two days with them at Mount Fuji in Japan. He also released a special album exclusively in Japan, CALL ME / Rising Star, which was a compilation of his first two mini albums in a two disc set. After returning to Korea he released the third mini album and began promoting the single 속았다 (Betrayed) (Narration Of 이요원) on September 17, 2009. During the period of promotions for this single, Taegoon also began activities outside of singing like appearing on variety shows and talk shows. After several months, activities for the album ended. He went back to Japan and successfully held several special performances in Japan before holding his first official concert, TAEGOON White Love 2009. The concert was held in Tokyo, Japan on December 11, 2009 and sold out. Taegoon then began preparing for his first full-length album. In April 2010 it was announced that Taegoon would begin his acting career by starring in the movie Piano Above the Sea.

== Discography ==
=== EPs ===
Title	Album details	Peak chart positions	
Title	Album details	KOR	JPN
1st Mini Album	Released: January 17, 2009 (KOR); Label: Pony Canyon; Format: CD; Track listing: 1. Intro; 2. **Call Me**; 3. One Two Step; 4. My Girl; 5. 난 그녈 알아 (I Understand You) (Feat. H-유진); 6. Hands Up	—	—
Rising Star	Released: May 13, 2009 (KOR); Label: Pony Canyon; Format: CD; Track listing: 1. Intro (feat. 혁성 from Space Cowboy, 김여희); 2. **슈퍼스타 (Superstar) (feat. 낯선)**; 3. Bye Bye; 4. 네까짓 게 (As Insignificant As You); 5. Call Me (Remix) (Feat. H-유진)	—	—
CALL ME / Rising Star	Released: September 16, 2009 (JPN); Label: Pony Canyon; Format: CD; Track listing: 1. Intro; 2. Call Me; 3. One Two Step; 4. My Girl; 5. 난 그녈 알아 (I Understand You) (Feat. H-유진); 6. Hands Up; 7. Intro (feat. 혁성 from Space Cowboy, 김여희); 8. 슈퍼스타 (Superstar) (feat. 낯선); 9. Bye Bye; 10. 네까짓 게 (As Insignificant As You); 11. Call Me (Remix) (Feat. H-유진)	—	—
The 3rd Mini Album	Released: September 17, 2009 (KOR); Label: Pony Canyon; Format: CD; Track listing: 1. The Beginning (Feat 후니훈, 수앤); 2. **속았다 (Betrayed) (Narration Of 이요원)**; 3. 말해줘 (Tell Me); 4. Finally; 5. Step By Step	—	—

- **Bolded** songs indicate single releases to help promote the EPs (mini albums)

=== Music videos ===
Year	Song title	Director(s)
2009	"Call Me" Starring Hero of TVXQ and Park Shin-hye	Unknown
2009	"슈퍼스타 (Superstar)" Starring Park Shin-hye	Joo Hee Sun
2009	"속았다 (Betrayed)" Starring Jooyeon of After School	Joo Hee Sun

=== Singles ===
- "Call Me"
- "슈퍼스타 (Superstar)" (feat. 낯선)
- "슈퍼스타 (Superstar)" (Remix Version) (feat. 낯선)
- "속았다 (Betrayed)" (Narration of 이요원)

Note: All singles above are official releases in order they were released. These singles were released to help promote either a single album, an EP (mini album) or an album. The singles are not released physically, but instead they are released as a digital single or airplay only single (promotional).

== Filmography ==
=== Films ===
Year	Title	Character
2010	Piano Above the Sea	Jung Woo Hyuk

== Concerts and events ==
=== Concerts ===
- 2009: TAEGOON Premium Week 2009 in Sanrio Puroland (Japan)
- 2009: TAEGOON Premium Week 2009 in Nakano Zero Hall (Japan)
- 2009: TAEGOON White Love 2009 (Japan)
- 2010: TAEGOON Spring Concert 2010 (Japan)

=== Fan meetings ===
- 2009: TAEGOON 1st Stage (Japan)
- 2009: Thanks Free Fanmeeting (Japan)

== Awards and nominations ==
Year	Award-Giving Body	Category	Work	Result
2009	Mnet Asian Music Awards	Best New Male Artists	"Call Me"	Nominated
