= DDD (EXID song) =

Single by EXID

from the EP Full Moon
- Released: November 7, 2017
- Genre: Electro-pop; nu-disco
- Length: 3:25
- Label: Banana Culture
- Songwriters: Shinsadong Tiger; LE; V!VE; Missy Elliott; Pharrell Williams
- Producers: Shinsadong Tiger; LE; V!VE; Pharrell Williams

EXID singles chronology
| "Night Rather Than Day" (2017) | "DDD" (2017) | "Dreamer" (2018) |

Music video
- "DDD" on YouTube

"DDD" (Korean: 덜덜덜; RR: deoldeoldeol) is a song recorded by South Korean girl group EXID for their fourth extended play, Full Moon (2017). The song was released by Banana Culture on November 7, 2017, as the EP's lead single.

The song peaked at number 9 on the Gaon Digital Chart. It has sold over 494,267 downloads as of December 2017.

== Composition ==
The song was written and produced by Shinsadong Tiger, LE and V!VE. It samples the 2015 song "WTF (Where They From)" by Missy Elliott featuring Pharrell Williams. The song was described by Billboard's Tamar Herman as an electro-pop song, "[k]icking off with a powerful bass beat and wailing synths". She added that the song "begins as a mid-tempo track before a breathy pre-chorus builds into a climactic chorus that's filled with groovy instrumentals and is enhanced by LE's garbled titular chant". Lyrically, the song "tell[s] the story of a woman demanding the truth from a lover who cheats on her time and time again but trembles in fear before her, as she alternates between reactions ranging from regret to anger to self-blame."

== Chart performance ==
The song debuted at number 9 on the Gaon Digital Chart, on the chart issue dated November 5–11, 2017, with 89,441 downloads sold and 1,819,529 streams. In its second week, the song fell to number 15, with 59,553 downloads sold and 2,628,760 streams. The song debuted at number 14 on the chart for the month of November 2017, with 222,859 downloads sold and 8,941,891 streams accumulated.

It also debuted at number 34 on Billboard Korea's Kpop Hot 100. In its second week, the song rose to number 21 and peaked at number 13 a week later. The song also debuted at number 6 on Billboard's World Digital Song Sales chart, becoming the group's third top ten entry.

== Music video ==
A music video teaser was released on November 5, 2017. The music video was officially released on November 7 through the group's official YouTube channel. The member Solji is absent from the music video due to health issues, but her vocals can be heard on the song.

== Live performances ==
The group performed the song two times before the official release, the first time on the 2017 Dream Concert on November 4 and the second time in an improvised live performance on a Seoul street on November 6. The group held their first comeback stage on November 9, on Mnet's M Countdown. They continued on KBS's Music Bank on November 10, SBS's Inkigayo on November 12 and SBS MTV's The Show on November 14. In the latter, the group was nominated for first place, but ended second with 6,865 points but won the following week with 7,388 points.

== Charts ==
| Chart (2017) | Peak position |
|---|---|
| South Korea (Gaon) | 9 |
| South Korea (Kpop Hot 100) | 13 |
| US World Digital Songs (Billboard) | 6 |

== Awards ==
=== Music programs ===
| Programs | Date |
|---|---|
| SBS MTV's The Show | November 21, 2017 |
