= Lead the Way/La'boon =

"Lead the Way / La'boon"

Single by T-ara

from the album Gossip Girls
- Language: Japanese
- A-side: "Lead the Way"
- B-side: "La'boon"
- Released: March 5, 2014
- Recorded: 2014
- Length: 8:12
- Label: MBK; J-Rock
- Lyricists: Okochi Kouta; Ichino Onomiya; Seiko Fujibayashi
- Producers: Okochi Kouta; MEG.ME

T-ara singles chronology
"Number Nine" (2013)	"Lead the Way / La'boon" (2014)

"Lead the Way" / "La'boon" is the ninth Japanese single (second double A-side) by South Korean girl group T-ara on March 5, 2014. It served as the second single from the group's third Japanese album Gossip Girls, and their last released original Japanese song.

== Background and release ==
On March 19, a preview of the "Lead The Way" Music Video was aired on Japanese television and was uploaded on the 20th on UNIVERSAL MUSIC JAPAN's official website and YouTube channel.

Both songs were later re-released on the group's third Japanese album Gossip Girls.

The single was released in three versions: eight limited CD+DVD editions, one type-A and seven type B (one per member), a box edition, and a regular CD Only edition. Each limited edition B features a DVD with a solo version of "Lead the way" PV featuring one solo member. The box edition includes all six versions in one DVD and includes a 16-page photobook. All editions include one trading card with a serial code. Limited editions come in a special package while the Regular edition comes in a normal paper case.

== Composition ==
"Lead the Way" is described as "a medium tempo ballad that depicts a "secret" love, with a beautiful lyrical melody that touches the heartstrings". "La'boon" is inspired by "Arabian Nights", being described as having a unique and exotic atmosphere.

== Commercial performance ==
The single debuted and peaked at number seven on Oricon daily chart, it fell to number nine for two weeks before re-peaking at number seven. It charted for seven days on Top 15. On the weekly chart, it reached number eight on the Oricon Weekly chart and charted for a total of five weeks selling 12,688 copies the first week.

The single peaked at number thirty-two on the monthly chart with a total of 16,230 copies sold.

== Track listing ==
Credits adapted from Tower Records

Regular Edition
No.	Title	Lyrics	Music	Length
1.	"Lead the Way"	Okochi Kouta, Ichino Onomiya	Okochi Kouta	04:01
2.	"La'boon"	Shoko Fujibayashi	MEG.ME	04:10
Total length:				08:12

Limited edition A
No.	Title	Length
3.	"Lead the Way" (Music video)	04:08
4.	"Lead the Way" (Music video making)	17:48
Total length:		21:56

Limited edition B (Eun Jung Ver) — DVD
No.	Title	Length
1.	"Lead the way (Music Video feat. Eun Jung ver.)"	04:08

Limited edition B (Qri Ver) — DVD
No.	Title	Length
1.	"Lead the way (Music video feat. Qri ver.)"	04:08

Limited edition B (Hyo Min Ver) — DVD
No.	Title	Length
1.	"Lead the way (Music video feat. Hyo Min ver.)"	04:08

Limited edition B (So Yeon Ver) — DVD
No.	Title	Length
1.	"Lead the way (Music video feat. So Yeon ver.)"	04:08

Limited edition B (Bo Ram Ver) — DVD
No.	Title	Length
1.	"Lead the way (Music video feat. Bo Ram ver.)"	04:08

Limited edition B (Ji Yeon Ver.) — DVD
No.	Title	Length
1.	"Lead the way (Music video feat. Ji Yeon ver.)"	04:08

Limited edition B - BOX — DVD
No.	Title	Length
1.	"Lead the Way" (Music video feat. Eun Jung ver.)	04:08
2.	"Lead the Way" (Music video feat. Ji Yeon ver.)	04:08
3.	"Lead the Way" (Music video feat. So Yeaon ver.)	04:08
4.	"Lead the Way" (Music video feat. Bo Ram ver.)	04:08
5.	"Lead the Way" (Music video feat. Qri ver.)	04:08
6.	"Lead the Way" (Music video feat. Hyo Min ver.)	04:08

== Charts ==
Chart (2014)	Peak position
Japan Singles (Oricon)	8
Japan Hot 100 (Billboard)	46
Japan Singles Sales (Billboard)	7

== Release history ==
Region	Date	Format	Label
Japan	March 5, 2014	CD; Music download	MBK; J-Rock
