= The 3rd Mini Album =

EP by Taegoon
- Released: September 17, 2009
- Genre: K-pop, R&B
- Length: 15:18
- Label: Pony Canyon (KR)

Taegoon chronology
Rising Star (2009)	The 3rd Mini Album (2009)

Singles from The 3rd Mini Album
- 1. "Betrayed" Released: September 17, 2009

The 3rd Mini Album is the third work by South Korean singer Taegoon, released on September 17, 2009.

== Singles ==
"Betrayed" was the first single to be released from the EP. Comeback performance was on KBS's show Music Bank on September 18, 2009.

== Track listing ==
1. The Beginning (Feat 후니훈, 수앤) [(Feat. Hoony Hon, Sue Ann)]
2. 속았다 (Betrayed) (Narration Of 이요원) [Sogatda (Narration Of Lee Yo Won)]
3. 말해줘 (Tell Me) [Malhaejwo]
4. Finally
5. Step By Step
