= Full Moon (EXID EP) =

EP by EXID
- Released: 7 November 2017
- Genre: R&B; trip hop; EDM
- Length: 22:00
- Language: Korean
- Label: Banana Culture
- Producer: Shinsadong Tiger; LE; V!VE; Big Blade; Monster Factory; PinkMoon; Junghwa; Gallery; biggguyrobin

EXID chronology
Eclipse (2017)	Full Moon (2017)	Trouble (2019)

Singles from Full Moon
- 1. "DDD" Released: 7 November 2017

Music video
- "DDD'" on YouTube

Full Moon is the fourth extended play by South Korean girl group EXID. It was released on 7 November 2017 by Banana Culture. The EP marked the return of member Solji, who was absent from the group's previous EP due to health issues. This time, she participated in the recording process but was absent from the promotions and the lead single's music video.

The EP debuted at number 7 on the Gaon Album Chart and at number 6 on US World Albums. It has sold over 16,000 physical copies as of November 2017.

== Background and release ==
In mid-September 2017, it was announced that the group would be returning in late October with a new album. Adding that member Solji would be participating in the recording process, but her participation in promotions was still in consideration. This comes after she was absent from Eclipse promotions and recordings in early 2017 due to her hyperthyroidism.

In mid-October, the group officially released the first teaser image, revealing the name as "Full Moon", the format as an extended play and setting the release date to 7 November 2017, 6 PM KST. On 23 October, the lead single name was revealed to be "DDD". A day after, a schedule was released through the group's official Twitter account. On the same day, teaser images of each member were posted until 26 October, starting with members Hyelin and Junghwa and ending with the group photo.

On 28 October, it was revealed that the physical copy of the album would include a 100-page booklet, a puzzle photo card in both sides, a group poster and a paper stand. Two days later, the track list was revealed. The EP consists of six songs, including two group songs and solos from Solji, Junghwa and Hyerin and a collaboration from LE and Hani. On 1 November, a highlight medley was posted on the group's official YouTube channel, showing a preview of each song. On the same day, the agency revealed that member Solji would not participate in the EP's promotions, but assured that she did take part in both recording and jacket photos. The final statement was that "Her health has improved considerably compared to before, but because of the physical limitations and deterioration in health that could result, we've ultimately decided not to have her resume activities". That day it was also revealed that the group's lead single "DDD" was deemed unfit for broadcast by KBS, due to the use of swearing and vulgar language/slang. The agency stated that they would adjust the lyrics and ask for reconsideration.

The EP was released on 7 November 2017, through several music portals, including Melon and iTunes. The CD was released on 9 November in South Korea.

== Promotion ==
=== Single ===
"DDD" was released as the title track in conjunction with the EP on 7 November 2017. A music video teaser was released on 5 November. The music video was officially released on 7 November through the group's official YouTube channel. Member Solji is absent from the music video due to health issues.

=== Live performances ===
The group performed "DDD" for the first time before the album's release on 4 November 2017, on the 2017 Dream Concert in Pyeongchang. On 6 November, the group performed the song on Gangnam street. The group started promoting on music programs on 9 November on Mnet's M Countdown.

== Chart performance ==
Full Moon debuted at number 7 on the Gaon Album Chart, on the chart issue dated 5–11 November 2017. It also debuted at number 6 on Billboard's World Albums, for the week ending 25 November 2017. The EP debuted at number 19 on the Gaon chart for the month of November 2017, with 16,286 physical copies sold.

== Track listing ==
No.	Title	Lyrics	Music	Arrangement	Length
1.	"DDD" (덜덜덜)	Shinsadong Tiger; LE; V!VE	Shinsadong Tiger; LE; V!VE	Shinsadong Tiger	3:25
2.	"Too Good to Me"	LE; Big Bread	LE; Big Bread	Shinsadong Tiger; Big Bread	3:24
3.	"Dreamer" (꿈에; Solji solo)	Monster Factory	Monster Factory	Monster Factory	3:24
4.	"Alice" (featuring PinkMoon; Junghwa solo)	PinkMoon; Jeonghwa	Shinsadong Tiger; PinkMoon; Jeonghwa	Shinsadong Tiger; PinkMoon	3:19
5.	"Weeknd" (LE X Hani)	Shinsadong Tiger; LE; V!VE	Shinsadong Tiger; LE; V!VE	Shinsadong Tiger	4:03
6.	"Foolish" (서툰 이별; Hyelin solo)	Hyelin; GALLERY; Kim Min-jun	GALLERY; bigguyrobin	bigguyrobin; Midnight	4:13
Total length:					22:00

== Charts ==
Chart (2017)	Peak position
South Korean Albums (Gaon)	7
US World Albums (Billboard)	6

== Release history ==
Region	Date	Format	Label
Various	7 November 2017	Digital download	Banana Culture
