= Led Apple =

South Korean rock band

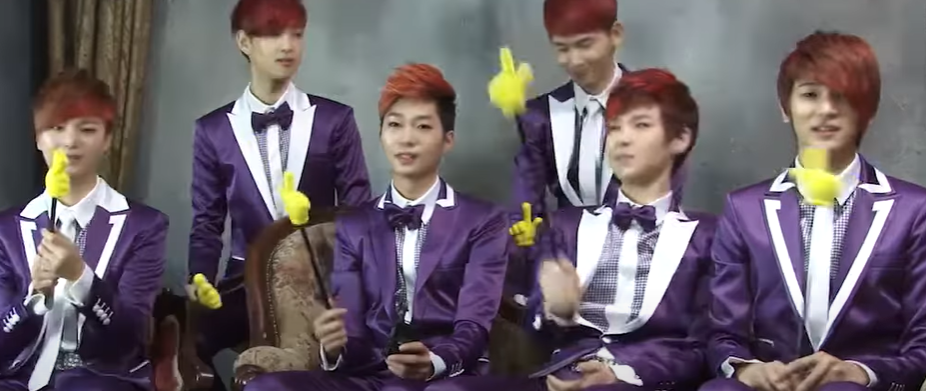

Background information
- Also known as: Ledt
- Origin: South Korea
- Genres: Pop rock; rock; alternative rock; electronic rock; K-pop; ballad; R&B
- Years active: 2010–2016
- Labels: StarKim Entertainment; Universal Music Japan
- Past members: Hanbyul; Junyeong; I-OH; Sunghyun; Minyong; Chihoon; Jaehoon; Keon U Kwangyeon; Kyosung; JUN; AKi; Kei

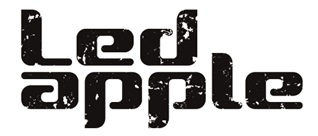
Logo for Led Apple

Led Apple (Korean: 레드애플; stylized as LEDApple) was a South Korean rock band formed by StarKim Entertainment in 2010. The band's final lineup consisted of Seo Youngjun (Jun), Lee Kyumin (Kei) and Kim Hyoseok (AKi)

The part "Led" in LEDApple stood for "Logic Egoism Delete" and was promoted during their debut but they stopped referring to it since their CODA mini-album was released. Instead they replaced it with a practical explanation of "shining as brightly as LED whenever they perform" which was eventually referred to as a tribute to their role-model, Led Zeppelin. The word "Apple" in the band's name is supposed to represent their fresh image as idols and fresh music that they release. On August 16, 2015, it was announced that the band would be changing their name to LedT starting on September 1, 2015.

The band made their debut on October 6, 2010, with their promotional single, "Dash" (Korean: 대쉬), a remake of Baek Ji-young's song of the same name. Since their debut, the band have released six singles and three mini-albums. The band disbanded March 6, 2016.

== History ==
=== 2010–2011: Debut and line-up changes ===
Prior to debut, member Minyong had been a contestant on the show Superstar K. The band was first revealed on September 27, 2010, as a five-member group and marketed as a new "idol rock band". The teaser for their debut single was released on September 29. On October 6, 2010, Led Apple performed their debut promotional single "Dash", which is a remake of a song originally sung by Baek Ji-young at the Busan International Film Festival and the music video was released the next day. The band's single was released alongside their single album, Logic Egoism Delete. They later performed the promotional single on November 11, 2010, on Mnet's M! Countdown as their debut stage.

On February 1, 2011, member I-OH announced his departure from the group on Twitter due to tuberculosis, however he did state that he would remain with the company. Vocalists of the group Minyong and Sunghyun later left for personal reasons that were not publicly revealed. Three new members joined the band for the release of their mini-album, Niga Mwonde (Korean: 니가 뭔데; lit. Who Do You Think You Are); Hyoseok, Jaehoon and Kyumin with Jaehoon becoming leader of the band. On June 13, 2011, the band released a comeback teaser for their mini-album and title track of the same name. However, the teaser was criticized for featuring the band in a club and drinking alcohol. Three members of Led Apple were minors at the time, and so the teaser was considered a bad influence towards youths.

The band's first mini-album, Niga Mwonde and lead single of the same name were released on June 15, 2011, alongside two different music videos; a regular version and a drama version. However, the band faced another controversy after many internet communities claimed that Led Apple's single "Niga Mwonde" had plagiarized CN Blue's song, "Love". However, Starkim Entertainment later released a statement addressing the plagiarism issue, stating that both songs were composed by Lee Sang-ho which is why they sounded similar.

On July 19, 2011, Led Apple released their second promotional single from the mini-album Niga Mwonde, "Birthday Killer". The song was released in an attempt to make anti-fans realise that their hate comments can cause idols to do extreme things out of their misery. The music video was praised for being "powerful" in bringing out a message by critics and fans alike. However the song was not a commercial success and didn't manage to peak within the top one-hundred on the Gaon Chart.

After ending their promotions for the Niga Mwonde mini-album, leader Jaehoon left the band citing personal reasons; no other information was disclosed. On October 28, 2011, the band announced a new member would be joining them for their upcoming single, Keon U who is well known as the son of famous composer, Park Kwang-hyun. Another new member, Hanbyul was also announced on November 3 as the new appointed leader of the group alongside teaser photos of the rest of the band, thus making them a six-member group.

On November 7, the teaser for their next mini-album, CODA was released and it also revealed Led Apple's new sci-fi concept. An extended nine-minute version of the teaser was also released on November 9 and was dubbed the "drama teaser". The music video for their next single, "Eojjeoda Majuchin" (Korean: 어쩌다 마주친; lit. Ran Into You By Chance) was released on November 11 and it featured former SeeYa member, Nam Gyu-ri as a cyborg and love interest in the video. In the week beginning December 2, the band's mini-album, CODA managed to reach an impressive number six on the Gaon Chart. On December 15, 2011, Led Apple was nominated for the "Anticipated Super Rookies for 2012" award at the Wave K Super Rookies Awards. The band managed to achieve the third highest number of votes for the award losing out to RaNia and B1A4, respectively.

=== 2012–2014: K-Rookies Party, Vol. 1 and solo concerts ===
On January 29, 2012, Led Apple revealed a teaser for their newest single, "Time Is Up". It was later announced that Led Apple appointed the new leader of the band to be Youngjun. On February 2, the band made their comeback stage on Mnet's M! Countdown with their newest single, "Time Is Up" and the song was released the next day. The music video was released on February 6 and the single was heavily promoted on music shows. On February 12, it was announced that Led Apple would star in their own reality television show titled, Led Apple Entertainment where the six members have to start up and control their own fictional entertainment company whilst also having trainee singers join their company. The show began airing on February 15 and the final episode aired on March 21 on SBS MTV.

On March 5, Led Apple announced on their Facebook page that the band would cease their promotions for "Time Is Up" and be releasing a new digital single titled, "Sadness". Their single was released on March 9 and they also performed it on KBS's Music Bank as their comeback stage. On March 16, the band made their Japanese debut after attending the K-Rookies Party, Vol. 1 concert that took place in the Nakano Sun Plaza in Tokyo, Japan. The band performed four of their songs as part of the concert's finale and later expressed their desire to come back to Japan during the press conference. On March 26, Led Apple released the music video for "Sadness" and the song peaked at number 58 on the Gaon Chart.

After ending their promotions for "Sadness", the group announced that they would be holding their first solo concert titled, Now Playing – Led Apple in Seoul, Vol. 1. The concert took place on May 11, at the Soundholic City in Seoul. It also featured the band, Toxic, the winner of KBS2's Band Survival: TOP band as guest performers. Due to the success of their first solo concert, the band held two extra provincial concerts in Daegu and Busan on May 18 and 19, respectively. The group also announced their return to Japan with their second solo concert. Their second solo concert was held on June 23, at the Shinagawa Prince Stellar Ball in Tokyo, however Keon U was unable to perform alongside the group due to health problems.

On July 5, 2012, Led Apple released a music video for their song "Run To You" from their third mini-album "Run To You". The song is currently being promoted on music shows. Former member KeonU departed from the group due to health issues shortly after the song was released.

On October 5, 2012, Led apple had their "Now playing Led apple vol.2" concert at Hongdae, v-hall.

On November 15, 2012, Led apple released their single "Let The Wind Blow".

Led apple performed a 'Music Note' series on their official YouTube channel, where once a week they performed a cover. The profits that were made from the advertisements that appear when playing Music Note were donated to the international organisation that protect Children's Rights, "Save The Children". 50 'Music Note' videos were made in the time period from January 7, 2013, to December 31, 2013. Led apple has hinted that they would be continuing the series as soon as possible.

On June 16, 2013, Led apple released their third mini album "Bad Boys". A bit later, on July 31, they released a Japanese single "Gimme kimi love".

On November 3, 2013, a Korean digital single "With The Wind" and its music video was released, and on December 25, they released a Japanese album "The Greatest World".

On January 22, 2014, Led apple released a digital single "Left Alone". Later in the year, on March 20, they released the music video for the single "Who Are You". A bit later a Japanese version of it was also made.

=== 2014–2016 Line-up changes and disbandment ===
On October 28, 2014, not long after the celebration of LED Apple's 4th anniversary, it was confirmed that Hanbyul, Kyumin, and Kwangyeon would be leaving LED Apple. Hanbyul stated that his desire to pursue a solo career motivated his choice to leave the group, whilst Kyumin asserted that he wanted to launch himself into the Hip-Hop genre. Kwangyeon cited medical problems for leaving the group. The agency supported the decisions of Hanbyul, Kyumin, and Kwangyeon to leave. A final performance with all of the members was held in December, 2014. In 2015, three new members joined LED Apple.

However, on January 1, 2015, the LEDApple official site stated that Kyumin would not leave the band. On January 5, 2015, Steroyal official Facebook announced 2 of LEDApple's new members, Hyunsang and Kyosung.

In 2016, the group disbanded.

== 2014: International Tour ==
=== European Tour ===
Date	City	Country	Venue	Event Title
February 14, 2014	Rotterdam	Netherlands	Maassilo	2014 World Tour Netherlands
February 15, 2014	Bucharest	Romania	Turbohalle	2014 World Tour Romania
February 21, 2014	Cologne	Germany	Die Kantine	LEDApple in Germany
February 22, 2014	Milan	Italy	FACTORY Milano	2014 World Tour Italy

=== Japanese Tour ===
Date	City	Venue	Event Title
January 31, 2014	Shibuya, Tokyo	SHIBUYA-AX	2014 World Tour Japan
April 4, 2014	Osaka	Azalea Taishō, Taishō-ku, Osaka	1st Photo Session & Mini Live
April 6, 2014	Shibuya	ASTRO HALL	1st Photo Session & Mini Live
May 7, 2014	Shibuya	Tower Records Shibuya	Who Are You Event
June 7, 2014	Osaka	BIG CAT	Hot Summer with Osaka
June 15, 2014	Tokyo	渋谷Club Quattro	Hot Summer with Tokyo
August 2, 2014	Shibuya	Shibuya Kōkaidō	Jump!! with Japan
October 19, 2014	Tokyo	Toyosu, 6 chome, Toyosu PIT	"Kiss me" Ledapple JAPAN BIG LIVE 2014 (PS: The Starting of Live - 2014 F/W New Mini Album "Kiss Me Darling")

=== 2nd European Tour ===
Date	City	Country	Venue	Event Title
August 9, 2014	Paris	France	Divan Du Monde	Hot Summer in Paris
August 10, 2014	Berlin	Germany	Columbia Club	Hot Summer in Berlin
August 22, 2014	Vienna	Austria	((szene)) Wien	LEDApple in Vienna
August 23, 2014	Moscow	Russia	VOLTA Club	LEDApple in Moscow
August 24, 2014	Helsinki	Finland	Gloria	LEDApple in Helsinki
August 30, 2014	Warsaw	Poland	Klub Progresja	LEDApple in Warsaw
October 31, 2014	Athens	Greece	KYTTARO Live Club / ΚΥΤΤΑΡΟ	LEDApple Jump! in Athens
November 1, 2014	Istanbul	Turkey	Bronx Pi Sahne	LEDApple Jump! in Istanbul
November 2, 2014	Barcelona	Spain	BIKINI Barcelona	LEDApple Jump! in Barcelona

=== LEDApple 2014 The Last Live Tour 「ありがとね LEDA」 ===
Date	City	Venue	Event Title
December 21–22, 2014	Shibuya, Tokyo	Shibuya VUENOS	LEDApple Day
December 23–25, 2014	Shibuya, Tokyo	Shibuya THE GAME	Happy Christmas Day
December 27, 2014	Osaka	Osaka LIVE SQUARE 2ndline	LEDApple Day in OSAKA
December 29, 2014	Shibuya, Tokyo	Shibuya WWW	Music Note Day Vol.1
December 30, 2014	Tokyo	Omotesando GROUND	Music Note Day Vol.2, New Year's Eve Countdown
December 31, 2014	Tokyo	Omotesando GROUND	New Year's Eve Countdown

== Former members ==
- I-OH (이오)
- Sunghyun (성현)
- Minyong (민용)
- Jaehoon (재훈)
- Keon U (건우)
- Hanbyul (한별)
- Kwangyeon (광연)
- Kyo (교)
- JUN (준)
- AKi (아키)
- Kei (케이)

== Discography ==
=== Extended plays ===
Title	Album details	Peak chart positions		Sales
Title	Album details	KOR	JPN	Sales
Niga Mwonde (니가 뭔데)	Released: June 16, 2011 (KOR); Label: Starkim Entertainment; Formats: CD, digital download	—	—	
Run To You	Released: July 10, 2012 (KOR); Label: Starkim Entertainment; Formats: CD, digital download	12	—	KOR: 4,064
Bad Boys	Released: June 17, 2013 (KOR); Label: Starkim Entertainment; Formats: CD, digital download	7	—	KOR: 3,218
KISS Tour	Released: July 31, 2013 (JPN); Label: Universal Japan; Formats: CD, digital download	—	38	
"—" denotes releases that did not chart or were not released in that region.

=== Single albums ===
Title	Album details	Peak chart positions	Sales
Title	Album details	KOR	Sales
LEDApple	Released: October 7, 2010 (KOR); Label: Starkim Entertainment; Formats: Digital download	—	
CODA	Released: November 11, 2011 (KOR); Label: Starkim Entertainment; Formats: CD, digital download	6	KOR: 3,274
Time Is Up	Released: February 3, 2012 (KOR); Label: Starkim Entertainment; Formats: CD, digital download	22	KOR: 2,487
"—" denotes releases that did not chart or were not released in that region.

=== Singles ===
Title	Year	Peak chart positions		Sales	Album
Title	Year	KOR	JPN	Sales	Album
"Dash"	2010	—	—		LEDApple
"Niga Mwonde" (니가 뭔데)	2011	— (Note: "Niga Mwonde" did not enter the Gaon Digital Chart, but it peaked at number 85 on the component Gaon Download Chart.)	—	KOR: 107,237	Niga Mwonde
"Someone Met By Chance" (어쩌다 마주친)	2011	89	—	KOR: 89,457	CODA
"Time Is Up"	2012	73	—	KOR: 53,653	Time Is Up
"Sadness"	2012	61	—	KOR: 147,177	Non-album single
"Run To You (Swing)"	2012	62	—	KOR: 150,745	Run To You
"Let The Wind Blow" (바람아 불어라)	2012	58	—	KOR: 80,505	Non-album singles
"I'll Be There For You" (Korean version)	2013	60	—	KOR: 57,241	Non-album singles
"Are You Eating Well?" (밥은 제때 먹는지)	2013	51	—	KOR: 51,984	Bad Boys
"Bad Boys" (feat. Kang Ye-bin)	2013	72	—	KOR: 35,264	Bad Boys
"With The Wind" (바람따라)	2013	76	—	KOR: 27,697	Non-album singles
"Greatest World"	2013	—	15		Non-album singles
"Left Alone" (둘도 없는 바보)	2014	86	—	KOR: 22,502	Non-album singles
"Who Are You?"	2014	—	—		Non-album singles
"Who Are You ～愛のフラワー～"	2014	—	10		Non-album singles
"—" denotes releases that did not chart or were not released in that region.

=== Soundtrack appearances ===
- 2012: "Smile Again" - Lovers of Haeundae OST
- 2013: "Going to You" - Bel Ami OST
- 2014: "Call My Name" - Marriage, Not Dating OST

== Tours and concerts ==
=== Main concerts ===
- Now Playing – Led Apple in Seoul, Vol. 1 (2012)
- LEDApple 1st Concert in Japan (2012)
- LEDApple World Tour Concert (2014) - Japan, Netherlands, Romania, Germany, Italy, Greece
- Hot Summer with (2014) - Tokyo, Osaka
- Hot Summer in (2014) - France, Germany, Poland
- LEDApple Mini Tour in Europe (2014) - Austria, Russia, Finland
- LEDApple 2014 The Last Live Tour 「ありがとね LEDA (Thank you, LEDA)」 (2014) - Shibuya, Osaka, Tokyo

=== Guest participation ===
- K-Rookies Party, Vol. 1 (2012)

== Awards and nominations ==
Year	Award/Critics	Category	Works	Result
2011	Wave K Super Rookies Awards	Anticipated Super Rookies for 2012	LED Apple	Nominated
2012	20th Korean Culture Entertainment Awards	Rookie Award (Idol Division Male)	LED Apple	Won
