= Again (T-ara EP) =

EP by T-ara
- Released: October 10, 2013
- Recorded: 2013
- Genres: K-pop; EDM; R&B
- Labels: Core Contents; KT Music
- Producer: Kwon Shi-bong

T-ara chronology
Treasure Box (2013)	Again (2013)	Gossip Girls (2014)

Singles from Again
- 1. "Number 9" Released: October 10, 2013

Music video
- Number 9 on YouTube

Repackage cover
- Again 1977 re-release cover

Singles from Again 1977
- 1. "Do You Know Me?" Released: December 4, 2013

Music video
- Do You Know Me? on YouTube

Repackage cover
- White Winter re-release cover

Singles from White Winter
- 1. "Hide and Seek" Released: December 14, 2013

Music video
- Hide and Seek on YouTube

Again is the fifth extended play by South Korean girl group T-ara, It was released on October 10, 2013 by Core Contents Media. It marked their first release with the original line-up following member Lee Areum’s departure from the group.

"Again 1977" is the repackaged version of "Again", released on December 4, 2013. It features a retro concept with a blend of pop and rock influences. The title track, "Do You Know Me?", which is a remake of Sand Pebbles' 1977 single "What Should I Do", showcases the group's versatile musical style and is known for its catchy melody and upbeat vibe.

== Background and release ==
The album was released digitally on October 10, including the title track "Number 9" (넘버나인) and b-side track "Because I Know" (느낌 아니까) and their music videos. "Number 9" is an electro-pop dance song with sad lyrics and melody. It was choreographed by Yama & Hotchicks, who also choreographed "Bo Peep Bo Peep". "Because I Know" is a mid-tempo song with an acoustic feel.

A repackaged edition of the EP, Again 1977, was released on December 4, 2013. It contains two new songs, "Again 1977" and "Do You Know Me", a remake of Sand Pebbles' 1977 hit, "What Should I Do". T-ara held a series of fan signing events in Suncheon and Gwangju, starting January 6. Notably, for the first fan sign, over 5,000 fans gathered around the venue, but for safety concerns, only 1,000 people eventually were allowed to attend. Actors Son Ho-jun and Yoon Jong-hoon attended the event.

The EP was re-released as special album on December 14, 2013 titled White Winter in addition to a Christmas song, "Hide and Seek" and an alternate version of the song featuring the same lyrics but slightly different instrumental.

In 2016, Chinese girl group "Miss Mass" released a remake version of the song in Chinese.

== Commercial performance ==
Shortly after its release, "Number Nine" reached number one on multiple real-time charts.

Again reached number 2 on the South Korean Gaon Weekly Albums Chart and number 45 on Japan's Oricon Weekly Albums Chart as a Korean import. The single "Number 9" reached number 5 on the Gaon Weekly Digital Chart and number 4 on Billboard's Korea K-Pop Hot 100. "Because I Know" charted at numbers 41 and 21 on the Gaon and Billboard charts, respectively.

== Track listing ==
Track list
No.	Title	Lyrics	Music	Length
1.	"Number 9" (넘버나인)	Shinsadong Tiger, Choi Gyu-sung	Shinsadong Tiger, Choi Gyu-sung	3:49
2.	"Because I Know" (느낌 아니까)	Baek Hyun-sung, Baek Deok-sang	Baek Hyun-sung, Baek Deok-sang	3:20
3.	"Hurt" (아파)	Kim Hee-sun	Baek Deok-sang	3:24
4.	"Don't Get Married" (결혼 하지마)	Duble Sidekick	Duble Sidekick	3:42
5.	"Number 9 (Club Version)" (넘버나인)	Shinsadong Tiger, Choi Gyu-sung	Shinsadong Tiger, Choi Gyu-sung	3:46

=== Again 1977 ===
No.	Title	Lyrics	Music	Length
1.	"1977 Do You Know Me" (1977 기억 안나)	Shinsadong Tiger, Polar Bear	Shinsadong Tiger, Polar Bear	2:37
2.	"Do You Know Me" (나 어떡해)	Shinsadong Tiger, Polar Bear	Shinsadong Tiger, Polar Bear	3:43
3.	"Number 9" (넘버나인)	Shinsadong Tiger, Choi Gyu-sung	Shinsadong Tiger, Choi Gyu-sung	3:49
4.	"Because I Know" (느낌 아니까)	Baek Hyun-jung, Baek Deok-sang	Baek Hyun-jung, Baek Deok-sang	3:20
5.	"Hurt" (아파)	Kim Hee Sun	Baek Deok-sang	3:24
6.	"Don't Get Married" (결혼 하지마)	Duble Sidekick	Duble Sidekick	3:42
7.	"Number 9 (Club Version)" (넘버나인)	Shinsadong Tiger, Choi Gyu-sung	Shinsadong Tiger, Choi Gyu-sung	3:46

=== White Winter ===
No.	Title	Lyrics	Music	Length
1.	"Hide and Seek" (숨바꼭질)	Baek Deok-sang, Baek Hyun-jung	Baek Deok-sang, Baek Hyun-jung	3.47
2.	"Hide and Seek (Winter Version)" (한겨울의 숨바꼭질)	Baek Deok-sang, Baek Hyun-jung	Baek Deok-sang, Baek Hyun-jung	3:53
3.	"Do You Know Me" (나 어떡해)	Shinsadong Tiger, Polar Bear	Shinsadong Tiger, Polar Bear	3:43
4.	"1977 Do You Know Me" (1977 기억 안나)	Shinsadong Tiger, Polar Bear	Shinsadong Tiger, Polar Bear	2:37
5.	"Number 9" (넘버나인)	Shinsadong Tiger, Choi Gyu-sung	Shinsadong Tiger, Choi Gyu-sung	3:49
6.	"Because I Know" (느낌 아니까)	Baek Hyun-jung, Baek Deok-sang	Baek Hyun-jung, Baek Deok-sang	3:20
7.	"Hurt" (아파)	Kim Hee Sun	Baek Deok Sang	3:24
8.	"Don't Get Married" (결혼 하지마)	Duble Sidekick	Duble Sidekick	3:42
9.	"Number 9 (Club Version)" (넘버나인)	Shinsadong Tiger, Choi Gyu-sung	Shinsadong Tiger, Choi Gyu-sung	3:46

== Charts ==
=== Again ===
Chart	Peak position
South Korea Weekly (Gaon)	2
South Korea Monthly (Gaon)	6
South Korea Yearly (Gaon)	64
Taiwan (5-Music)	2
Japan Weekly (Oricon)	45

=== Singles chart history ===
Song	Peak		
Song	KR Gaon	KR Hot 100	US World
"Number 9"	5	4	7
"Do You Know Me"	19	15	—

=== Other charted tracks ===
Song	Peak
Song	KR Gaon
"Hide and Seek"	37
"Because I Know"	41
"Hurt"	124
"Don't Get Married"	150
"1977 Do You Know Me?"	176

== Sales ==
Again Total pure album sales
Region	Sales
South Korea (Gaon)	41,133
Japan (Oricon)	5,800

== Accolades ==
=== Awards and nominations ===
Award ceremony	Year	Category	Result	Ref.
Golden Disc Awards	2014	Album Bonsang	Nominated	
Golden Disc Awards	2014	Popularity Award	Nominated	

=== Rankings ===
Year	Publisher	List	Recipient	Placement	Ref.
2017	SBS PopAsia	9 of the best T-ara singles	Number Nine	7	

== Release history ==
Region	Date	Format	Label
Various	October 10, 2013	Download digital music	Core Contents Media KT Music
Various	December 4, 2013	Digital download (Again 1977)	Core Contents Media KT Music
Various	December 14, 2013	Digital download (White Winter)	Core Contents Media KT Music
South Korea	October 16, 2013	CD	Core Contents Media KT Music
South Korea	December 4, 2013	CD, digital download (Again 1977)	Core Contents Media KT Music
South Korea	December 14, 2013	Digital download (White Winter)	Core Contents Media KT Music
