= Do You Know Me? =

2013 song by T-ara

Single by T-ara

from the album Again 1977
- Language: Korean
- Released: December 4, 2013
- Genre: K-pop; Dance-pop
- Length: 3:42
- Label: Core Contents Media
- Songwriters: Shinsadong Tiger; White Bear

T-ara singles chronology
"Number Nine" (2013)	"Do You Know Me?" (2013)	"Hide and Seek" (2013)

Music video
- Do You Know Me? on YouTube

"Do You Know Me?" (Korean: 나 어떡해) (also translated as "What Should I Do?") is a single by South Korean girl group T-ara. Released on December 4, 2013, the track serves as the lead single for the group's reissue of their eighth extended play Again, retitled Again 1977. The song is a modern remake of Sand Pebbles' 1977 single "What Should I Do?".

== Background and release ==
On, Core Contents Media, announced that T-ara would release a bonus single to promote Again's re-issue, titled Again 1977. The song was confirmed to be a remake of Sand Pebbles' 1977 single "What Should I Do?". which had won the first MBC University Festival in 1977. A ballad version of the song, titled "1977 I Don't Want To Remember", was also included in the album. To bring T-ara's vision to life, the group worked with composers Shinsadong Tiger and Polar Bear.

== Composition ==
Penned by Shinsadong Tiger, T-ara's long-time collaborator, and White Bear, "Do You Know Me" is a vibrant dance-pop track with a retro concept, blending pop and rock influences. The song opens with a playful narration—"Huh? Where have we seen each other?"—that sparks curiosity and sets the tone for the track's excitement. Its chorus and lyrics, paired with a dynamic composition of alternating singing and rapping, create a well-rounded and engaging listening experience.

== Creative direction ==
The concept of "Do You Know Me?" revolves around a retro, nostalgic theme that blends elements of 1970s pop with modern dance and musical styles sampling Sand Pebbles’ 1977 hit "What Should I Do?", T-ara reinterprets it with updated production and a fresh perspective. At the single's release showcase, Soyeon, the group's main vocalist, explained during a press conference that the group aimed to preserve the essence of the original while infusing it with a modern feel, reflecting their vision of balancing nostalgia with innovation. The choreography complements the retro-modern aesthetic with playful and theatrical movements, such as the "pistol dance" and "diamond step." According to Dong-a Newspaper, the signature moves are aimed to highlight the group's polished synchronization and inject a sense of fun and elegance into the performance. On stage, T-ara added a Broadway-inspired flair with vintage-style outfits and musical-style choreography.

== Music videos ==
=== Background and release ===
On December 2, 2013, T-ara held a release event for Again 1977 at the MegaBox COEX branch, where they premiered the official music video for "Do You Know Me?". The original singer, Yeo Byung-seop attended the premiere along with actor Son Ho-jun. It was directed by Hong Won-ki. The official music video was released on December 4, 2013. Running nearly seven minutes long, the video features the ballad version of the song, offering an emotional and cinematic presentation. A second version, showcasing the original upbeat rendition of the track, titled "Do You Know Me? (China Dance Ver)", was released on December 17, 2013. Both videos were filmed in China.

== Reception ==
=== Commercial performance ===
Upon its release, "Do You Know Me?" achieved strong positions on South Korean streaming platforms such as Bugs! and Soribada. The single peaked at number nineteen on Gaon weekly chart and reached the fifteenth spot on Billboard Korea Hot 100. By the end of December, the single had sold nearly 180,000 digital units. Meanwhile, the ballad version of the song charted at number 176 on the Gaon chart.

=== Critical reception ===
"Do You Know Me?" received mixed reactions, with its nostalgic charm and modern reinterpretation sparking discussion. Critics were divided. While the Broadway-inspired performances of Do You Know Me? stood out, the track's retro feel—despite claims of modern sophistication—drew comparisons to T-ara's previous hits like Roly-Poly. Reporter Kim noted the similarities and his expectations of a riskier track from the group, as they usually do. Reporter Choi singled out tracks like It Hurts and Don't Get Married from the album which offered more of the group's their unique tones, but overall, the project felt rushed. Choi remarked that the album relied heavily on T-ara's established style, offering little novelty. While Do You Know Me? showcased T-ara's signature charm and stage presence, StarNMusic critics yearned for more risk-taking. Scores ranged from 55 to 70 out of 100, reflecting recognition of their effort while desiring greater freshness.

In a more positive reaction, the original singer of What Should I Do?, Yeo Byung-seop of Sand Pebbles expressed admiration for T-ara's version. While he had reservations about other rearrangements of the song featured on programs like 'I Am a Singer', he praised T-ara's take as "really good" and predicted it would be a hit. He extended an invitation for the group to perform at the University Song Festival Forever concert.

== Charts ==
=== Weekly charts ===
Chart (2013)	Peak position
South Korea (Gaon Digital Chart)	19
South Korea (K-pop Hot 100)	15

=== Monthly charts ===
Charts (December 2013)	Peak position
South Korea (Gaon Digital Chart)	35

== Sales ==
Digital sales
Country	Sales
South Korea (Gaon)	177,000

== Release history ==
Country	Date	Album	Distributing label	Format
South Korea	December 4, 2013	Again 1977	Core Contents Media	Digital download
Worldwide	December 4, 2013	Again 1977	Core Contents Media	Digital download
South Korea	December 14, 2013	T-ara Winter	Core Contents Media	Digital download
Worldwide	December 14, 2013	T-ara Winter	Core Contents Media	Digital download
