= Every Night (EXID song) =

Single by EXID
- Released: October 2, 2012
- Recorded: 2012
- Genre: Pop
- Length: 3:51
- Label: AB
- Songwriters: Shinsadong Tiger; LE
- Producer: Shinsadong Tiger

EXID singles chronology
"I Feel Good" (2012)	"Every Night" (2012)	"Up & Down" (2014)

"Every Night" (Korean: 매일밤; RR: Maeilbam) is a song recorded by South Korean girl group EXID. The song was released as a digital single on October 2, 2012, through AB Entertainment. The song is written by member LE and co-produced by LE and Shinsadong Tiger. "Every Night" is a rearrangement of the track "Call", which was on their first extended play, Hippity Hop.

== Music video ==
The music video for "Every Night" was released on October 4, 2012. In the video, the members of EXID prepare a bright red concoction made from an unknown substance. They pour the red liquid into glass test tubes and pack them in a padded briefcase. The scene transitions to a party, where a man in a suit is surrounded by women in white dresses. When EXID arrives, they toast to the man, and then proceed to throw the test tubes on the floor, releasing the red liquid. The substance causes the women to sneeze and vomit champagne onto the man, rendering them unconscious. As the women collapse, EXID dances around wearing gas masks. The video then rewinds to reveal that the red liquid was made from deadly red chilis.

== Promotions ==
EXID had their comeback stage on Music Bank on October 12, 2012. The group also performed "Every Night" on various live television music shows such as M Countdown, Show! Music Core and Inkigayo in October and November 2012. EXID also performed the song on various international television appearances. In Music Bank's K-Chart "Every Night" debuted and ranked at number 40, but dropped to number 50 the next week, the last week in the K-Chart.

== Chart performance ==
"Every Night" entered the Gaon Singles Chart at number 43 during the week of September 30, 2012. By the end of October "Every Night" peaked at number 100 on the Gaon Monthly Single Chart and had sold 162,096 downloads.

== Track listing ==
No.	Title	Length
1.	"매일밤" (Every Night; mae-il bam)	3:51
2.	"매일밤" (Instrumental)	3:51
Total length:		7:42

== Credits and personnel ==
- Shinsadong Tiger – executive producer co-producing
- Heo Sol-ji – vocals
- Ahn Hee-yeon – vocals
- Seo Hye-lin – vocals
- Ahn Hyo-jin – vocals, rap, writing, co-producing
- Park Jung-hwa – vocals

== Charts ==
Chart	Peak position
Gaon Singles Chart	43
Gaon Monthly Singles chart	100

== Release history ==
Region	Date	Format	Label
Worldwide	October 2, 2012	Digital download	AB Entertainment; LOEN Entertainment
South Korea	October 2, 2012	Digital download	AB Entertainment; LOEN Entertainment
