= Number Nine (T-ara song) =

- Japanese single Regular edition

Single by T-ara

from the album Again, Gossip Girls
- Released: 10 October 2013 (KR); 20 November 2013 (JP)
- Recorded: 2013
- Genre: J-pop, dance
- Label: MBK Entertainment; EMI Records Japan
- Songwriter: Shinsadong Tiger

T-ara Japanese singles chronology
"Target" (2013)	"Number Nine" (2013)	"Lead The Way / La'boon" (2014)

T-ara Korean singles chronology
"Sexy Love" (2012)	"Number Nine" (2013)	"Do You Know Me?" (2013)

X'mas edition cover

"Number Nine" is a song by South Korean girl group T-ara, from their eighth extended play Again. The song was written and composed by Shinsadong Tiger and Choi Gyu-sung. "Number Nine" was released as the lead single from the album on 10 October 2013. The song was released in Japanese with "You Gave Me Guidance" which was selected as the theme song to the film Jinx!!! starring member Hyomin. The single was released on 20 November 2013, through EMI Records Japan. "Number Nine" was selected as the song of the year by KoreanWave Indonesia.

== Background and release ==
On 15 September, Core Contents Media revealed that T-ara will make their comeback on 10 October 2013. The song was said to have a "stronger sound", but still remain catchy. On 26 September 2013, T-ara released a 30 second teaser video, filmed in a desert. On 1 October, T-ara released another teaser for "Number Nine" on their official website. In their black-and-white teaser, they used an "upgraded mature beauty". The choreography for "Number Nine" was created by Yama & Hotchicks dance studio, known for their work on several of T-ara's previous hits, including "Bo Peep Bo Peep", "You're Driving Me Crazy" and "Roly Poly".

The music video along with the album was released on 10 October 2013, and the drama version was released on 16 October 2013. "Number 9" is an electro-pop dance song with sad lyrics and melody. It was choreographed by Yama & Hotchicks, who also choreographed "Bo Peep Bo Peep".The song features a gentle guitar melody, coupled with an "unexpected intense sound". It was co-composed by Sinsadong Tiger and Choi Gyu Sung. "T-ara Party Non-Stop Remix" by DJ Takao Fukushima is composed of ten songs spanning 45 minutes: "Bo Peep Bo Peep", "Yayaya", "Lovey-Dovey", "Roly-Poly", "Waeroni", "Bye Bye", "Like The First Time", "Target", "Bunny Style!" and "Deja-Vu".

The single was released in four different types: two CD+DVD limited editions that come in a special paper jacket, a regular edition, and a X-mas edition that comes with a remix album and a DVD, packaged in a box with six "T-ara Santa Ver." rubber key holders. All editions of the single come with a trading card with a serial code, chosen randomly out of seven types.

== Promotions ==
The first time the song was revealed was on 6 October 2013 when performed at Hallyu Dream Concert. T-ara had their first televised performance of "Number Nine" on Mnet's M! Countdown on 10 October. This was followed by additional performances on music programs including Music Bank, Show! Music Core and Inkigayo

== Reception ==
=== Commercial performance ===
After its release, "Number Nine" reached number five on the Gaon Weekly Digital Chart and number 4 on Billboard's K-pop Hot 100. In China, the song topped YinYueTai's both Korean and official charts. The second version video also peaked within top five on the chart. In Japan, the single topped the Weekly USEN chart. "Number Nine" is T-ara's most viewed music video on YouTube, spanning over 100 million views on the official music video uploaded by Core Contents Media.

=== Critical reception ===
SBS PopAsia named the song number 7 in their list of 9 best T-ara singles. In 2024, NME ranked the song at No. 6 on its Best T-ARA songs to date praising the "perfect fusion of both the EDM sound that defined the era and the softer dance-pop that punctuated their earlier music". "Number Nine" was selected as the song of the year by Korean Wave Indonesia.

== In popular culture ==
"Number Nine" has appeared in the sixth episode of KBS's 2013 drama Secret Love, where Jo Min-joo (played by Song Min-kyung) works out in the gym playing the song. In 2014, the song was played and performed by Han Tae-hee (played by Jung Da-bin) in KBS1's daily drama Melody of Love. The song was added to Pump It Up 2's playlist in 2016 and has since been one of the most played songs on the game.

== Track listing ==
All editions
No.	Title	Length
1.	"Number Nine (Japanese ver.)"
2.	"Memories: You Gave Me Guidance" (記憶～君がくれた道標(みちしるべ)～)

Regular edition bonus track
No.	Title	Length
3.	"A-ha"

Limited edition A DVD
No.	Title	Length
1.	"Memories: You Gave Me Guidance Music Video (Director version)" (熊澤尚人監督)
2.	"Bunny Style! Live Performance (T-ara 2nd Album Premium advance)" (プレミアム先行LIVE)

Limited edition B DVD
No.	Title	Length
1.	"Kumazawa Naoto Director version Music Video (Making-of video ver.)" (メイキング映像版)
2.	"Lies (Japanese ver.) Live (T-ara 2nd Album Premium showcase Live 2013.7.13)" (コジンマル～嘘～)

X'mas edition: Disc one
No.	Title	Length
1.	"Number Nine (Japanese ver.)"
2.	"Number Nine (Japanese ver.)" (Club ver.)
3.	"Kioku: Kimi ga Kureta Michishirube"

X'mas edition: Disc two Remix Album
No.	Title	Length
1.	"T-ara Party Non Stop Remix (DJ Takao Fukushima Remix)"

X'mas edition: Disc three DVD
No.	Title	Length
1.	"Number Nine (Japanese ver.) Music Video" (メイキング映像版, Making-of video version)
2.	"T-ara 2nd Album Premium showcase Live Special Movie"

== Charts ==
Chart (2013)	Peak position
Japan Singles (Oricon)	13
Japan (Japan Hot 100)	62
South Korea (Gaon)	5
South Korea (K-pop Hot 100)	4
US World Digital Songs (Billboard)	7

== Sales ==
Reported sales
Country	Sales
South Korea	605,000 (Note: Accumulated sales for Number Nine in 2013 only.)
Japan (Oricon)	18,000 (Note: Accumulated sales for Number Nine in 2013 only.)

== Awards and nomination ==
Award ceremony	Year	Category	Recipient	Result	Ref.
KU Awards	2013	Song of the Year	"Number 9"	Won	
ArcH K-Pop Music Awards	2013	Top 10 Songs	"Number 9"	Won	

== Credits and personnel ==
- Boram – vocals
- Qri – vocals
- Soyeon – main vocals
- Eunjung – lead vocals
- Hyomin – lead vocals, rap
- Jiyeon – vocals
- Shinsadong Tiger – producer, lyricist, arranger, music
- Choi Gyu Sung – producer, lyricist, arranger
