= Spin (breakdancing move) =

Break dancing terminology

Stabbed windmills transitioning into a back spin.

A spin is a b-boying move that involves rotation of the breaker's body about some axis in contact with the ground. It is possible to perform a spin on virtually any part of the body, but bare skin often causes painful and spin-killing friction with the floor. To solve this problem, many breakers employ pieces of cloth or wear long clothing, pads, or caps. When the dancer uses his hands to aid in speeding up the spin, it is called tapping. A dancer may tap for a few rotations and then glide for subsequent rotations. Spins form an integral part of many breakers' routines, while others eschew them in favor of more complex-looking repeated movements, back and forth, after each rotation in a given direction.

== Variants ==
- 1990s and 2000s are spinning handstands sometimes considered to be power moves. The term 1990 was created by ken swift of the Rocksteady crew but the actual move of spinning on one hand was created by Spinner of the Dynamic Rockers who at the time called it a hand spin. Kenny's move was a little different where he went up on a one arm hand stand and dropped to a shoulder spin. Spinner's move is the one that many b-boys around the world have named the 1990.
- Back Spin - A spin on the upper back. The legs are often tucked into the chest and the move is often linked with windmills. This move was developed by JoJo of the Rock Steady Crew. The current record holder for most backspins is Bboy RTHYM with a total of 92 spins performed on June 3, 2021. The former record was also held by RTHYM with 83 spins.
- Hand Glide - A one-armed spinning breakdance move. The breaker balances on one arm that has the elbow stabbed into the torso. The other hand pulls against the floor to spin the body in a circle. The move is usually performed with a glove to reduce friction.
  - Sideways Hand Glide - This variation looks like a Freeze (breakdance move) but is executed on the side after the handglide pick up speed the usually go to the side.
- Headspins - The body is balanced vertically with only the head in contact with the floor. This spin is perhaps the one most commonly associated with breakdancing. Kid Freeze was considered the best in head spin in the early '80s the pioneer and master of headspin.
- Knee Spin - A spin on one or both knees, normally usually in the kneeling position. Breakers often perform freezes or stylish movements of the upper body while spinning.
- Chair Kneespin - A spin on one knee and bringing the right or left foot in front of the non spinning knee ankle of the non spinning foot is placed usually in front of spinning knee kneeling position. Breakers often perform stylish movements of the upper body while performing the (Chair Kneespin) spinning back to their feet.
- Icey-Ice - Spinning in a chair position having the head grounded.
- Side Chair Spin - Spinning in a side chair position.
- Air Chair Spin - Spinning in an air chair position.
