= Crazy Eyes Crew =

Azerbaijani hip-hop dance crew

Crazy Eyes Crew is an Azerbaijani hip-hop dance crew founded in December 2012, which won several national dance competitions in Azerbaijan in 2013 and gained fourth place in the World Dance Championship in Copenhagen in the same year.

The members of the group are Emin "Evan" Aghayev, Javid Mammadov, Malikmammad "Wild Man" Abdullayev, Ildirim "B-Boy Makvin" Mirmammadov, Murad "Loss" Dadashov, Tamras Abasov, and Babek "MadBeaT" Gulubeyli.

In February 2013 Crazy Eyes Crew won the title among the four teams in Baku, and in April they won the national dance title, also winning the SilkWay International and Baku cup competitions in the same year. They have been recognized at the Azeri Dance Stars Awards at the Heydar Aliyev Palace in January 2014.

In 2014 the group reached the semi-final of the Turkish national competition Yetenek sizsiniz Türkiyə (Turkey's Got Talent), broadcast by Star TV, gaining an audience approval rating of 93%.

In 2015 crew member Maga Abdullayev won his category as a soloist at the Azerbaijan Open Dance Cup in Baku.
