= Float (breakdancing move) =

A stationary float with leg position similar to that of a Nike kick.

The float or turtle is a b-boying move in which breakdancers turn on their hands with their body horizontal to the floor. Its origins are from basic gymnastics.

Though it appears to demand great strength, the float actually requires balance above all because the breaker's weight is supported on the elbows which are firmly planted ("stabbed") into the lower abdomen near the anterior superior iliac spine.

Stationary floats are often employed as freeze poses. On the other hand, breakers can "walk" with floats by shifting weight from one hand to the other and thus moving in a straight line or circle. These moving floats can be made to spin very fast and become the first power moves that were done in the 80's.

== Variants ==
- Crab - The Crab is a specific term for a two-handed stabbed float that may walk in a line but does not entail any of the variations below.
- Turtle AirFlares/Criticals - This move is considered a combination of an AirFlare, and a Cricket; however this move is performed during a turtle/handglide freeze. The legs rotate as if doing a windmill and the breaker pumps off the ground and spins. The breaker then lands in the stabbing position again.
- Turtle Freeze - A stationary Turtle.
- Handglide Freeze - A stationary Handglide

=== Spinning floats ===
- Turtle - This is a standard spinning float. The breaker shifts weight from one hand to the next, moving one hand forward and the other backward to produce rotation or a circular "walk".
  - Pumping Turtle or Darkhammers - A Turtle in which the breaker actually hops/jumps with the hands instead of just shifting from hand to hand.
- Handglide - A one-handed Turtle.
- Cricket - Much like the Handglide, but the breaker hops on the central hand rather than merely spinning. The free hand pulls until the centered wrist becomes taut and can twist no further. The free hand pushes off from ground (and the legs may kick upward as well), allowing the centered hand to hop and turn itself to allow for the process to repeat. Bboy Pop of Gamblers crew is famous for his beautiful crickets as well as jackhammers (see below).
  - Jackhammer/Hydro - A Cricket performed with one hand. Jackhammers are often faster, and the free hand is usually placed on the back or in some other position that clearly shows control with the centered hand. Many world records have been conducted on the number of Jackhammers a bboy could do, with a top record of 113 in a row by Bboy RYUTA.
- Airchair Spin - A floating chair freeze; however, the breaker is spinning upon the grounded hand. This move can usually be located during a breaker's Flare or Airflare/Airtrack set. Those powermoves are commonly used to exert proper momentum to do such floats.
  - Chair Flares - A flare variation, pumping with the stabbing arm from airchair position while maintaining the motion of flares. These are not usually used in rapid succession, but incorporated into a bboy/bgirl's performance.

=== Straight-arm floats ===
Floats may be performed with arms locked straight, meaning the elbows do not support the body. Rather, these floats involve strength and speed to keep the entire body up. To assist this extremely difficult athletic move, often the legs bend upwards, the body leans forward slightly, and/or the hands are turned in the direction of spin.

- UFO or Air Turtle - Movement is like that of a turtle, with legs pointing back, except that arms are extended and locked. Knees may be bent or legs may flail outward.
  - Reverse UFO - A UFO float executed with hands behind the back, near the bottom.
  - Buddha - Similar to Air Turtles except that the knees are kept locked together and behind the arms, shins parallel to the floor, back as parallel to the floor as possible. Bboy Waka of Headhunterz was one of the first to perform Buddhas in his sets.
  - Deadman - Similar to UFOs where the legs are held straight together. It is a commonly seen movement done in gymnastics floor routines. Bboy Junior is a famous bboy who is known to use Deadman floats in his sets.
- Boomerang - While sitting with legs in front and in a V shape, the hands are placed in between the thighs. The legs are lifted and kept straight while the hands walk in a circle. This looks quite different from most other floats.
