= Buzz (mascot) =

One of the two official mascots of the Georgia Institute of Technology

- University: Georgia Institute of Technology
- Conference: ACC
- Description: Anthropomorphic yellowjacket
- First seen: 1972
- Related mascot(s): Ramblin' Wreck

Buzz is the current official mascot of the Georgia Institute of Technology. Buzz is usually represented as a stylized yellowjacket with yellow-and-black fur, white wings, a yellow head, and antennae. Buzz is almost never drawn with six legs, but rather with arms, legs, hands (in white gloves) and feet (in black Converse high tops), like a human. Invented in 1972 and restyled in 1979, Buzz reflects the tradition of referring to Georgia Tech students as "Yellow Jackets." Buzz is also one of Georgia Tech's emblems and trademarks, one that they defended in a 1998 legal conflict with the Salt Lake Buzz.

== Tradition ==
Like many mascots, Buzz communicates via hand gestures and sign language, rather than speech. At some school events, there are a few people who dress up as Buzz. The identities of these individuals must be kept secret until their graduation. They must be in excellent physical condition, about 5 ft 4 in tall (1.63 m), and must be able to do a front "suicide" flip called a Buzz Flip, Buzz's trademark move. Those interested in donning the Buzz suit must take part in a two-day tryout, judged by the former Buzz. Buzz is officially part of Georgia Tech's cheerleading team, so the Buzz tryout happens at the same time as the other cheerleading tryouts.

Buzz is beloved by Georgia Tech students and fans for his spirit and antics. He is a prankster and likes to crowd-surf. Buzz is seen at football games, basketball games, Georgia Tech Six Flags Night, and other events. Buzz has parachuted onto the field for pre-game festivities, does push-ups every time Tech scores, and conducts the band for the Budweiser song, a common jingle for the beer. Buzz is involved with charity events, team photos, sports conventions, and official Georgia Tech events such as the annual President's Dinner. Buzz can also be hired for social gatherings, such as weddings and birthday parties.

== History ==
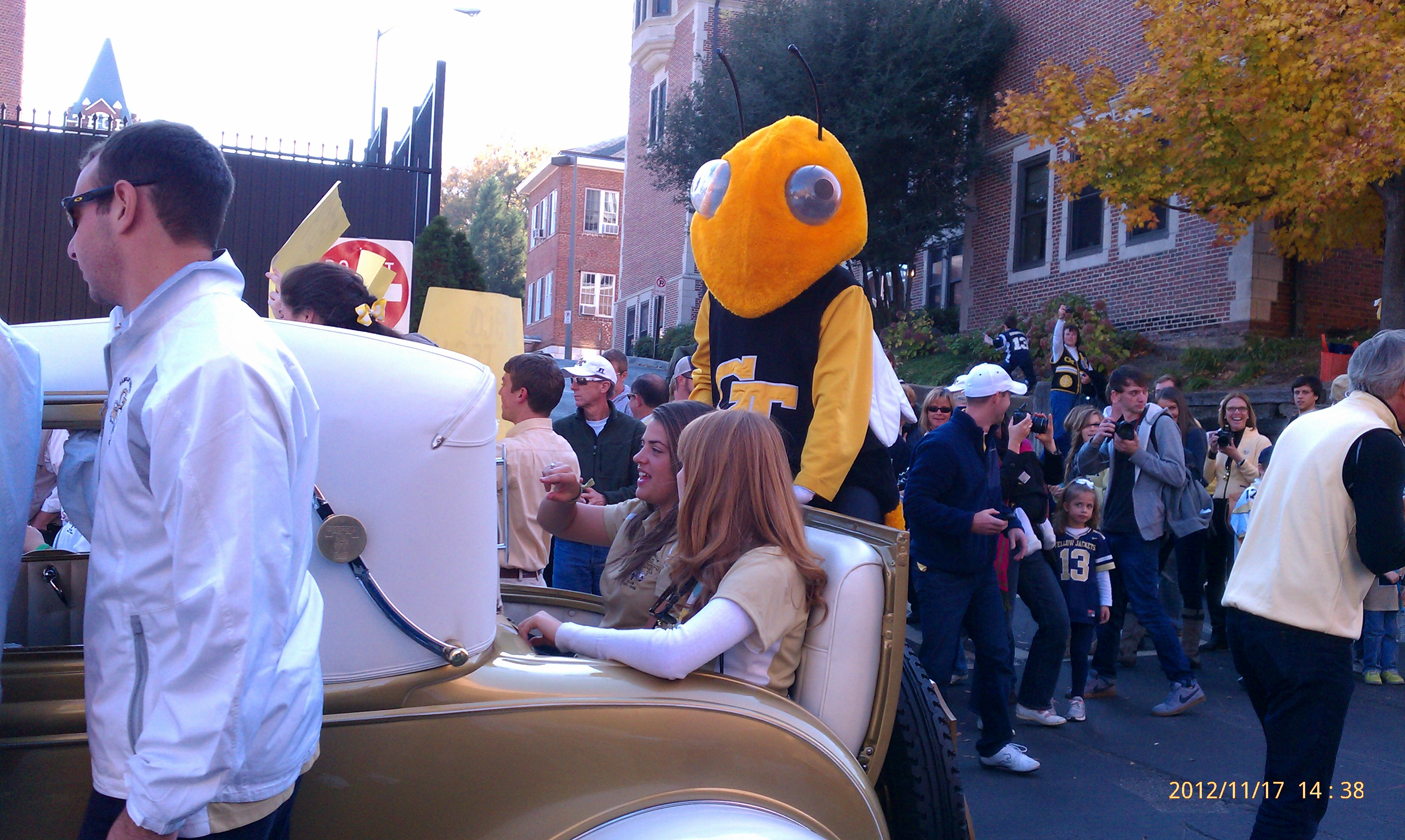
Buzz riding on the back of the Ramblin' Wreck

The term Yellow Jacket or Yellowjacket has been used to refer to students and the various sports teams as early as the 1890s. Fans of Georgia Tech would often wear yellow jackets to sporting events in support of the early Georgia Tech teams. The early football teams, lacking gold fabric for jerseys, wore yellow jerseys. John Heisman told the Atlanta Constitution that he wanted his teams to be referred to as the Yellow Jackets in October 1905. In November 1906, the Atlanta Journal portrayed a University of Georgia football player being attacked by a yellowjacket with the words "Somebody's about to get stung" as the caption. This was the first time that the Georgia Tech sports teams were referred to as the Georgia Tech Yellow Jackets in print.

=== Invention and reinvention ===
The original Georgia Tech Yellow Jacket mascot was Judi McNair who, according to the Winter 2004 edition of the Georgia Tech Alumni Association Tech Topics magazine, donned a homemade yellowjacket costume in 1972 and performed at home football games. She rode on the Ramblin' Wreck and appears in the 1972 Georgia Tech Blueprint yearbook. McNair's mascot was considered a great idea, as it was a big hit with the fans.

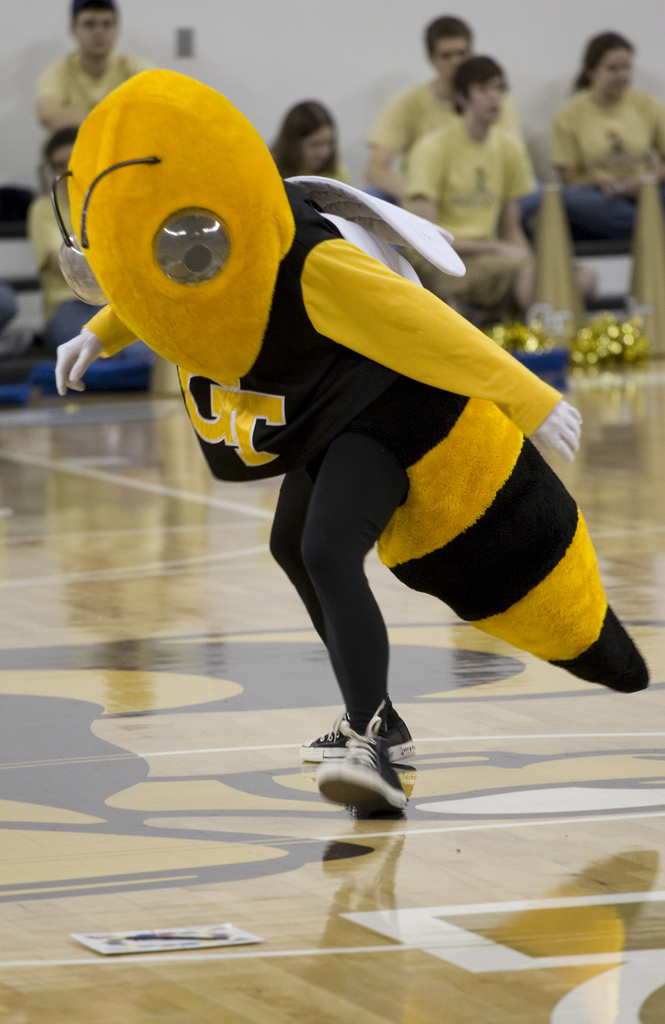
Buzz playing Twister at a basketball game

In 1979, McNair's idea for a Yellow Jacket was reintroduced by another Georgia Tech student, Richie Bland. Bland, who was apparently unaware of McNair's prior initiative, paid $1,400 to have a local theme park costume designer make a yellow jacket costume that he first wore at a pep rally prior to the Tennessee football game. Rather than obtain permission from Georgia Tech as Judi had done in 1972, this student, a few weeks later simply sneaked onto the field in costume during a football game and ran across the field. The fans naturally believed that this costumed character was acting as an official member of the cheerleading squad and responded accordingly. By 1980 this new incarnation of the yellow jacket mascot was given the name Buzz Bee and was adopted as an official mascot by Georgia Tech. This new Buzz character would be the model for a new Georgia Tech emblem, designed in 1985 by Mike Lester.

=== Salt Lake Buzz lawsuit ===
In 1998, Georgia Tech filed a trademark infringement lawsuit against the Salt Lake Buzz, a Pacific Coast League minor league baseball team. The Institute had negotiated a deal with the team, but the team backed out of the agreement before it was finalized and filed suit in Utah for the right to use the mark. Tech filed a countersuit and won in 2001. As a result, the team was forced to change its name (to the "Salt Lake Stingers"; several years later, it would adopt its current name of the "Salt Lake Bees") and pay Georgia Tech $600,000, although Georgia Tech spent $700,000 to $800,000 during the dispute.

=== Contests and stunts ===
Buzz participates in several mascot contests. In 1997, Buzz won an Access Atlanta poll due to creative ballot stuffing by Tech students. In 2005 and 2006, Buzz was named to the Capital One All-American Mascot Teams and participated in the Capital One Mascot Challenge. In 1993, Buzz won National Champion Mascot at the Universal Cheerleading Association (UCA) cheerleading championships in San Diego. In 2000 and 2001, Buzz won the NCA (National Cheerleaders Assoc.) mascot of the year and in 2004 and 2006, Buzz received second place in the NCA Mascot Competition in Daytona, Florida. In 2023, 2025, and 2026, Buzz became a National Champion again, taking home first place in the NCA Mascot Competition in Daytona, FL. On June 14, 2008, Buzz rappelled down the 40 story Viewpoint lofts building in Midtown, Atlanta as part of a university fundraiser.

== See also ==
- Clean, Old-Fashioned Hate – the rivalry between Tech and UGA
- Traditions of Georgia Tech – a comprehensive list of Georgia Tech Traditions
