= Les Mathurins (acrobatic act) =

French acrobatic duo

Les Mathurins was a French acrobatic duo, active around 1952 to 1964. Their act was slapstick comedy in style and included elements of balancing, tumbling and table-sliding. The word "Mathurin" is a French nickname for a sailor ("Jack Tar" in English), and they dressed as sailors in their act.

== Name ==
They were sometimes referred to as "The Mathurins" or just "Mathurins", and were sometimes incorrectly credited as "Les Malthurins" and "Les Maturines".

== Notable performances and television appearances ==
They appeared in UK variety shows including Val Parnell's Sunday Night at the London Palladium, This is Television (a television awards show in 1954) and pantomimes between 1952 and 1962. They also performed in Bertram Mills Circus at Olympia London in the 1955/6 Christmas season, where the programme names them as Sacha and Gilbert.

They also performed in the United States, notably on the television shows The Ed Sullivan Show in 1959 and The Hollywood Palace in 1964.

Several appearances are listed in the UK newspaper The Stage, with accompanying comments such as "A lot of fun is extracted from a tumbling acrobatic routine by Les Mathurins, two experts at the art and it is a tonic to any variety-lover to see such a worth while speciality receiving the warm appreciation it does at this theatre", and "A special word of praise for the energetic speciality act of Les Mathurins. Their high-speed acrobatics are exceedingly clever and novel, and the applause they receive is indeed well earned".

== Acrobatic moves ==
One of the notable acrobatic moves in their act resurfaced in the 1980s as a classic b-boy (breakdancing) move known as the Windmill (b-boy move), and its discovery is therefore usually attributed to prominent b-boy Richard Colón (better known by his stage name Crazy Legs). However, Les Mathurins performed this move in an edition of the television show Sunday Night at the London Palladium on 24 November 1957. It is not known what the move was called in the acrobatics world, whether Les Mathurins created it, or if anyone performed it earlier than 1957.

== Obscurity and confusion ==
Despite their numerous appearances mentioned in The Stage and other newspapers, little is known about Les Mathurins. The only known surviving recording of their performance was an appearance on "Sunday Night at the London Palladium" (Mathurins on Vimeo) which was broadcast live on 24 November 1957 and is available on DVD.

Another act called Mathurins existed much earlier around 1926 and was mentioned in "Le Mutilé de l'Algérie" as "Mathurins, gymnastes sur mât de navire" (gymnasts on a ship's mast). This suggests a similar nautical theme, but it is not known whether there is any other connection between Les Mathurins and this earlier act.
