= Uprock =

Competitive urban street dance

Uprock, or Rocking, as it was referred to, also known as Bronx Rock, Rock Dance, Brooklyn Rock, Burning or Freestyle is a competitive urban street dance, performed to the beats and rhythms of soul, rock and funk music, but was mostly danced to a specific and exclusive collection of songs that contained a hard driving beat. An example of such a song is the Funk classic "It's Just Begun" by noted jazz musician Jimmy Castor. The dance consists of foot shuffles, spins, turns, drops, freestyle movements and more characteristically a four-point sudden body movement called "jerk".

== Use of gestures ==
Although women participated in this style of dance, it was usually danced by two men facing each other. The underlying philosophy of Rocking was to undermine the "opponent" with hand gestures called "burns". One would "burn" one's opponent with a variety of these hand gestures that would mimic an action that would be considered detrimental to the dancer's adversary. Two examples of typical and fundamental burns are the bow and arrow, and the shotgun. The "winner" of these mock battles was usually the individual who was able to choreograph and execute his or her burns creatively and even artistically to the rhythm and syncopation of the music.

In this sophisticated and rhythmic form of Rock paper scissors, one would have to dance thoughtfully as to not step forward and inadvertently get one's head "sledge hammered". Although it is common knowledge that Uprocking is supposed to be a mock battle, those who are less professional sometimes get carried away with the dance which can result in real violence.

== History ==
Rock dance evolved in New York in the late 1960s.

The origins of rocking/uprocking are a subject of considerable debate, but nobody knows where the "Rock Dance" originated. All we know is that it came from the Puerto Rican community in New York City starting in the late 1960s. The terms 'rock' 'uprock' and 'toprock' in their various forms and connection with Rock Dancing came long before the term Breakdancing was coined by the media for the first time in the American press, during the early 1980s, when the term “Breakdance” was born, and came from the Media. Before the media changed name from what what it was originally called, which was 'Rock' 'Rocking', 'Uprock" the name was replaced by the media to Breakdancing.

As Rocking/Uprocking developed, body movements called "Burns" resembled a conflict where hand gestures would be used to emulate a fight against an opposing dancer. Being skillful in this new dance form, Apache (a Brooklyn dancer) would get the better of his opponents by skillfully using burns. Dancers throughout New York City in all Boroughs continued to invent new movements and gestures to create a street dance. Many gang members began to perform this dance. Rocking/Uprocking became a competitive dance that caught on very quickly.

=== Early 1970s ===
By the early 1970s Rock evolved and became a local dance performed mostly by adolescent men throughout the New York City. Some say it originated in Brooklyn in the late 1960s, while many others say it was developed in the Bronx. However, it is now more widely accepted that the Dance Culture itself spread throughout New York City into all Boroughs because the best dancers danced mostly at Manhattan Clubs, where everyone took notice of the different styles and incorporated some of the moves into their own style of dancing.

It was common to see this form of dance at block parties, teen dances and festive gatherings, and in particular at St. Mary's Recreation Center in the South Bronx, where dancers from all over the city would come and dance every Tuesday and Thursday until October 1, 1974, when Rubberband, one of the most popular Rock dancers in the city from back in those days, got stabbed to Death by a 14-year-old youth, after an argument over a Dollar. Rubberband was 21 years old at the time of his death.

In Bushwick Brooklyn, you had Dancers like Lil Dave, Bushwick Joe, Chuck, Apache, Vinny, Noel, Blackie, Sammy, Papo774, Angel, Ralph Cassanova and several others who actually danced at the New York Clubs and contributed to this dance culture as much as anyone else throughout New York City.

In Park Slope and South Brooklyn you had dancers such as Spice One, Lil Star, Brother George, Jose and Ron of J&R Dancers, Paydro, Eve Rock, Nako Avatar, Burn One, Viejo, Slinky, Batman, the Twins IND's and Eddie Santana.

In Manhattan and the Bronx there were dancers such as Dee Dee, Rubberband, Mexico, Salsa, Mike Dominquez, Danny Rodriguez, Markie D, Ito, Kid Terrific, Choco, Shaky, Willie Marineboy, Willie (Whip) Rivera, Frank Rojas, Enoch Torres, Robert (Lucky) Feliciano, Hector Barrios, Pete Martinez, and many others some of which are still active today around the world to this day.

Some dance battles created problems because of the disrespectful style of battling which was soon eliminated but not entirely from the South Bronx because of the fights that would break out during some those encounters. Brooklyn however kept that style of Rock Battle Dancing alive, where it still exists today. Though many battles would end peacefully, several others did not. Some of the best dancers from the Bronx danced professionally with the Latin Symbolics Dance Company who were the first Professional Urban Street Dance Team in New York City History, founded in 1972 as a Mambo Team by George Vascones RIP, who was also the President of the Dance Company.

=== Late 1970s ===
Rock dance was taken seriously by some of its participants and supporters as it was an integral part of socializing. Prize money, women, bragging rights were all coveted and to the better and popular dancers went the spoils. Mimicking Crew mentality where a member from one crew would successfully take the "colors" (jacket with crew insignia) from a member of a rival crew, dancers would sometimes compete for their respective shirts, however this practice was mostly done in Brooklyn, where the dance remained a bit primitive with the mind set of burning the other dancer with disrespectful hand gestures. Similar to a gang rumble, idiosyncrasy, this was considered a particularly severe humiliation, thus, it was considered one of the highest stakes in a battle. If you lost your shirt, you would sometimes lose your nickname and/or your crew's name.

While other Rock Dancers throughout the city had critical acclaim from dancing in City Wide Rock Competitions Brooklyn Rockers kept their beloved style of Jerks and Burning in Brooklyn in local competitions. However, a few dancers from Brooklyn competed in competitions against the better dancers from other boroughs at contests in clubs like The Bon Sua, The Footsteps, Latin Times and the Starship Discovery in Manhattan where they placed in the top 5. One of the biggest City Wide Rock Contests was hosted by The Hoe Ave Boys Club on 174th St. in the Bronx in 1977. Dancers from all Boroughs competed and it was won by Hector Barrios and Pete Martinez from the Latin Symbolics Rock Team.

=== Fading popularity ===
At first, the popularity of Rocking was challenged by the well known disco dance called the Hustle. Some talented Rockers preferred the gracefulness of dancing with women that the Hustle provided, as opposed to the adversarial and sometimes dangerous climate of competing against another male dancer. By the mid-1980s and into the 1990s Rocking began to fade into history. At the same time, another competitive form of urban dance called Breaking all but replaced Rocking, though many breakers would do Rock movements as part of the dance. In the late 1990s there was a revival by Danny Boy, Ralph Casanova AKA King Uprock, Richard Santiago "Break Easy", Burn One, Charlie Uprock, Mr. Loose, Spice One, Forrest Getem Gump and got global attention through the internet with mostly the Brooklyn style of Rocking being done in a Burn & Jerk type of style, which Brooklyn is known for. In the 2008 another resurgence of the Bronx Style, spearheaded by Willie (Marine Boy) Estrada, Frank Rojas and Enoch Torres, is a popular style because there is more freestyle movement in Bronx style, which requires more dancing as opposed to the Burn & Jerk Style Brooklyn does. However, the 2nd generation Rockers also came from Manhattan and Bronx referred to as Rock/UpRock/Bboys, such as Ken Swift and Doze Green of the Rock Steady Crew, also called used the term "Uprock" only they did a lot more floor moves, and innovated a different way of Uprocking.

=== Rock Dance today ===
There are still active Rock Dance Crews in all the boroughs of New York City and around the world such as the VII Gems Rock Division, Mastermind Rockers (Global), The Bronx Boys (Global), Dynasty Rockers (Global), Time 2 Rock (CA), Forever We Rock (CA), Breaks Kru, Rock Lordz (MN, KS, NV), Ready to Rock (Global), Incredible Rockers and For The Rock (Russia).

There is an active internet presence of Rock dance on YouTube, Facebook and other platforms as well as Rock competitions all over the world at various dance events.

== Brooklyn Dance ==
The dance involves two opposing dancers, or teams dancing alternatively or simultaneously performing a choreographed "battle" throughout the duration of a complete song. Although some of the moves Rockers execute emulate fighting, physical contact is never allowed. As stated above, physical contact is usually a sign of inexperience and/or dysfunctional behavior. If a Rocker is experienced he or she will not make any contact in order to "burn" his or her opponent. Rocking's rules of engagement penalizes any dancer who actually touches the opponent, even if contact was made unintentionally.

Experienced Rockers are usually familiar with the songs that they dance to and use the lyrics and sounds of the music to out-do their opponent. The music is the guideline for when to execute a jerk, burn, or freestyle. The dancer uses the music's lyrics or sounds in his or her favor in order to create the physical narration of the mock battle that manifests.

It becomes monotonous if not redundant should a Rocker utilize burn after burn while dancing. Really good dancers tend to maintain Rocking as an art form and not just an all out burnfest. There should be a constant give and take of burns and jerks in order to give each opponent the space to burn the other, but also exhibit dance moves.

Opposing dancers can also face off in a line formation called the "Apache Line". In contrast to the circle formation in breakdancing, the Apache line allows multiple opposing dancers or crews to face each other and execute their burns. Back in the 1970s it was a fascinating display to watch. Each Rocker must keep in his/her line formation while battling. One form of Apache line competition utilized rotation positioning. In other words, dancers would battle until either he is tapped to step out by another Rocker, or the opponent has been worn down.

These days, in the initiation of a new Rocker who intends on joining a particular crew, an Apache line is created. Borrowing again from gang culture social protocol, the new Rocker must battle each member on the Apache line. The new Rocker must dance down the center of the Apache Line and battle each Rocker while maintaining a discipline in the use of jerks, burns and freestyle for which he is then evaluated.

This style of dancing was done mostly in Brooklyn, other Boroughs had different ways of doing things, and the Bronx faded out this style of dancing Rock at an early point. Brooklyn continues to dance along the same mind set and rules which existed when they first started battling each other.

== Etymology ==
Many also called this dance "Freestyle" mostly because it was improvised steps to the music.

No one is sure where the term "Rocking" came from or why this form of dance was named using this word. It may have been that because of the dance's inherent nature of conflict, the colloquialism of "Rocking" as in "Rocking" the opponent was used. An example would be in describing a triumphant boxer or fighter by saying, "He rocked that dude."

Another school of thought is that it was called "Rock" because early on rockers danced mainly to a specific range of rock and roll songs that fell into a category that would be more accurately categorized as a hybrid of rock/funk. Examples of songs that fell into this genre would be "It's Just Begun" by Jimmy Castor, and the live version of "Sex Machine" by James Brown. These and many other songs were not quite soul nor rock and roll, yet, they provided the kind of hard driving beat that fueled the Uprock style of dance.

A dance hall flyer announcing a "Rock Contest", would confuse some who were not familiar with the term Rocking as it related to this specific form of dance. Individuals would show up at an organized party event expecting a rock concert having mistaken the event as a "Rock and roll dance". After about a decade since its inception, "Rocking" became known as "Uprocking". It was the same dance with a different name.

== See also ==
- Breakdance
- Dance-rock
- Capoeira is an Afro-Brazilian art that also combines dance with mock fighting.
