= Kick (breakdancing move) =

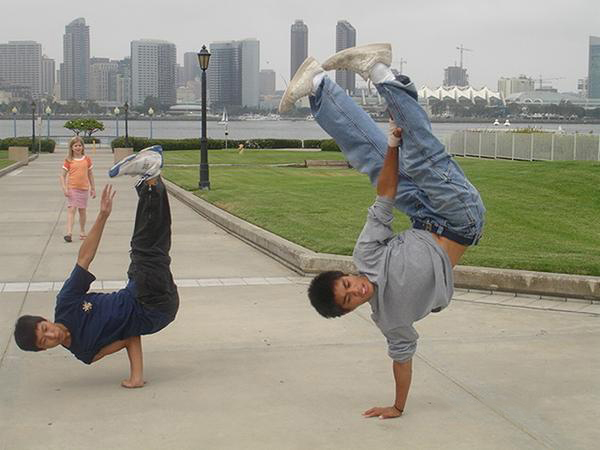
San Diego B-Boys, one performing an airchair (left) and one performing a pike (right)

A kick is a b-boy move that generally constitutes a one-handed handstand with the legs and free arm in some stylish position. Kicks can be employed as freezes, in which case they are held as long as possible. Alternatively, they can be executed quickly and powerfully to impress onlookers. Kicks are often named after letters or symbols whose form they imitate. The hand used for the stand is the "standing hand" and the leg on the same side of the body is the "standing leg." The other pair of appendages are the "free" hand and leg. Kicks are scored as footwork/legwork in the sport.

== Variants ==
Some notable kicks include:

- Airchair - Similar in appearance to a kick, the airchair is sometimes considered a float because it employs a stab. The position of the legs and free arm varies.
- G-Kick - The free hand grabs either foot, which is bent backwards so the back forms a G shape.
- K-Kick - The free leg is held vertical, with the free arm held flat along the side. The standing leg is held straight at an angle like the letter "K".
- Pike - The legs are together in a not-necessarily 90 degree angle at the side of the body.
- Nike - The free hand touches the straight free leg's toe while the standing leg is bent, mimicking the Nike sign.
- V-Kick - (or applejack) The bboy jumps back onto both hands and kicks his legs in front in a V shape. This is quite different than the kicks described above. Both hands touch the ground and the hips are level with or below head-level.
