= Windmill (breakdancing move) =

Breakdance move

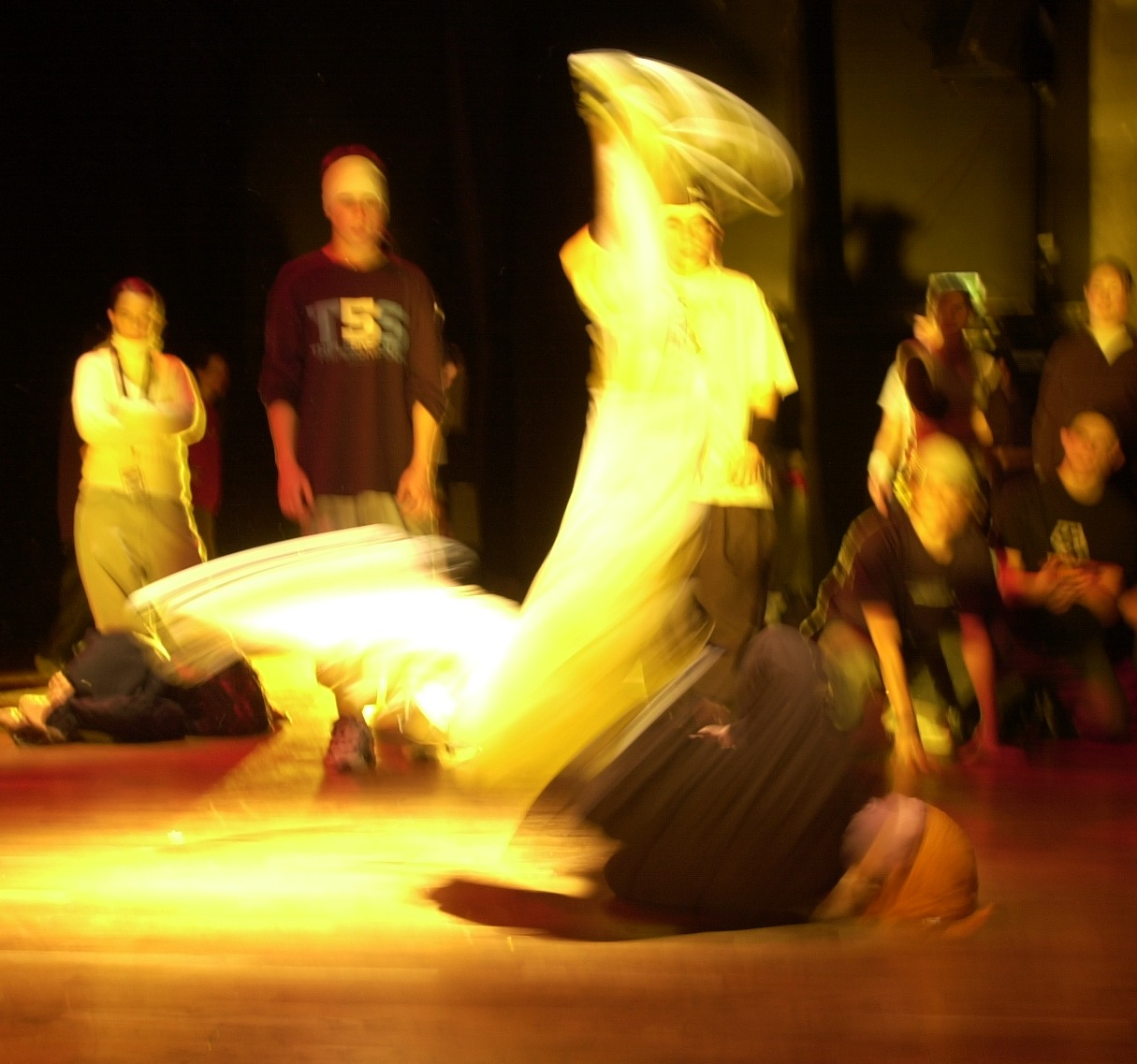
Windmill

The Windmill (or briefly Mill) is a popular breakdancing move. The breaker rolls their torso continuously in a circular path on the floor, across the upper chest/shoulders/back, while twirling their legs in a V-shape through the air.

== Origin ==
The discovery of this move is credited to Crazy Legs of the Rock Steady Crew from Bronx, NY. It was accidentally created when he overshot his chair freeze into a continuous back spin. From then on, it became a widely popular move. The move was inspired by a Kung Fu kick from the ground, drawing inspiration from kung fu films (notably Bruce Lee films).

== Description ==
Stabbed windmills transitioning into a back spin.

The twirling of the legs is akin to twirling a math compass around in the hands; the momentum created by this twirling motion gives the breaker the majority of their power. The leg position and motion is seen in several other power moves, which makes the windmill an essential power move to learn first.

The basic windmill can either be "stabbed" or "unstabbed". The stab position helps to keep the hips up high which aids in momentum and execution of the move, especially during the first rotation. Unfortunately, it slows down movement when multiple windmills are performed as a "restab" must be done before each subsequent windmill, greatly reducing the fluidity of the motion. Accomplished breakers may stab to begin the windmill, but they will perform subsequent rotations unstabbed (sometimes called a "forearm mill"). The majority of breakers accustomed to the motion of the windmill will use a coindrop in order to bypass the "stab" motion completely while using the downward momentum to slide directly from the forearm to the shoulder to the back while spinning the legs in the usual v-motion.

Although the term "v-shape" is used, the degree of the split is directed correlated with how the windmill performs overall. The closer to a 180 degree split, the higher the possibility for a faster and cleaner overall performance.

=== Power Windmills ===
Windmills performed without the use of hands usually rotating using the head as the pivot point; results in a much faster rotation. As power windmills free the use of hands, there are many variations corresponding to the location of one's hands.

==== Variations ====
There are many variations of Power Windmills, some of the more popular ones including:

- Nutcrackers- Windmills performed with hands placed over groin.
- Barrels- Hands and shoulders rounded in front of the body as if hugging a barrel to one's chest.
- Bellymills- The breaker does not pivot from the back to the head or the arms, but to the chest and abdomen.
- Handcuffs- Hands held together behind the back.
- Genies/Coffins- Hands crossed over chest.
- Confusions- Hands placed over the ears with the elbows extended outward.
- Eggbeaters- Hands placed on hips.
- Tombstones/Frankensteins- Hands and legs extended straight in front one's body.
- Babymills/Munchmills- Legs crossed and close to the body, arms usually in a barrel position.
- Grab Millz- The boy/girl grabs the non-kicking leg and pulls it closer to his or her body so that it is in a bent position while performing windmills.
- Lotus- The windmill is done with legs folded in a lotus position.
- Tap mills- One of the legs is tapped on the ground during the head pivot.
- Doubles/No-handed Halos- Using one's head for elevation, while still maintaining the proper angle of a windmill, two rotations are executed before the back makes contact with the floor. Made popular by BBoys MN Joe (KH Cali) and Jamal (Predatorz)

=== Halos ===
The Halo is a move similar to headmills and air tracks/air flares. Icey Ice from the New York City Breakers is credited with making this move. In this move the breaker's head stays in constant contact with the floor on a 45-degree angle, and the body rotates around the head such that the point of contact with the ground traces a halo pattern around the calvaria. No other part of the body touches the ground except the hands which are briefly employed at the point when the forehead is facing down. They may protect the face, stabilize the rotation, or push off to gain momentum.

Halos are often launched from windmills because the two share many similarities, plus the windmill is easier. Halos can be performed with the legs swinging relatively near the floor, or they can become more and more vertical until they approximate a headspin. However, there are distinct differences in that halos employ the hands for a part of the rotation, the point of contact changes, and the swinging motion of the legs remains critical in generating momentum. Halos are performed much higher off the ground than the typical windmill, but lower than the air track/air flare, described below, which has a similar motion but has the hands contacting the ground rather than the head.

=== Air Track ===
The Air Track is more extreme still, and they are considered a separate move. An Air Track is basically a halo or headtrack in midair. You use only your hands and you hop from hand to hand in somewhat of a circular motion. There is dispute about whether this move is different from the Air Flare. Some say that Air Tracks have the body traveling only on the X axis, while with an Air Flare the body travels on both X and Y axes. Others contend that the moves are one and the same, and that the name difference is merely based on the evolutionary history of the moves.

== See also ==
Booker T (wrestler), a professional wrestler who popularised the move under the name, "The Spinaroonie"
