= Stab (breakdancing move) =

Breakdance technique

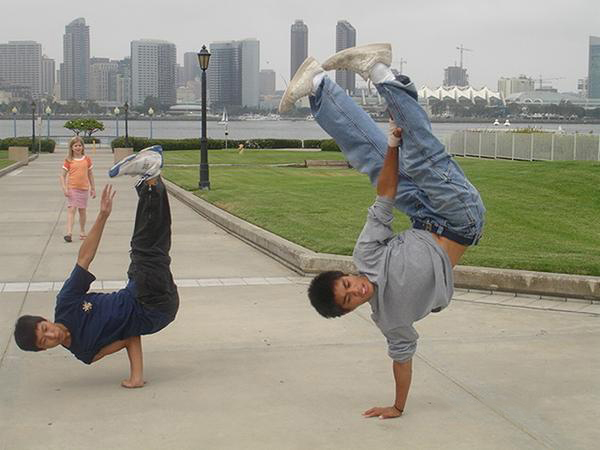
The bboy on the left stabs with his right arm to facilitate his airchair.

The stab is a breakdance technique necessary to perform many downrock and power moves. It is not a distinct move, but is incorporated into many breakdance moves including the turtle, cricket, jackhammer, crab-walk, hand glide, some versions of the windmill, and many other floats and freezes. It allows the breakdancer's entire weight to be supported by bony structures while expending minimal muscular energy to maintain balance.

The stab is accomplished by placing the olecranon process of the elbow firmly against the bones or tensed muscles of the abdomen, side, or back. Perhaps the most basic stab places the elbow against the anterior superior iliac spine. Meanwhile, the hand is placed against the ground. The radius and ulna are held perpendicular to the ground with the weight of the body on either side of the point of contact kept in perfect balance. Assuming this balance is maintained, the rest of the body can then be suspended above the ground in any desired position.
