= Airflare =

Breakdancing move

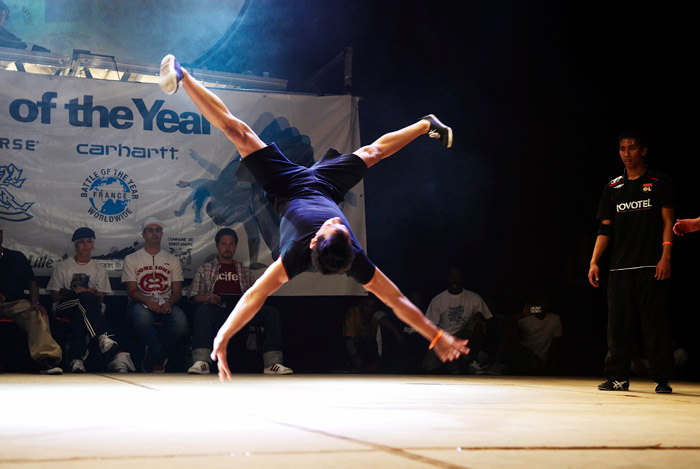
Airflare in a breaking battle

The airflare (or air-flare) refers to an acrobatic movement in which the performer rotates the torso around the vertical axis of their body (extending from the head down vertically) whilst simultaneously traveling in a circular path along a plane parallel with the floor. The feet are not allowed to touch the ground during the execution of this move and both hands are used to execute standard airflares.

== Origins and pioneers ==
Example of airflares, standard form (video)

The move emerged from a similar move called the airtrack, in which one rotates in a vertical axis but does not travel in a circular path. The airtrack can be traced back to the early 1980s. By the 1990s, a dancer named Paulo Nunes in Europe had created the variation which is essentially the same move as the modern airflare. At that time in Europe it, was referred to as the airtwist.

By the mid 1990s video arrived by way of EZ-Rock of Rocksteady which introduced the maneuver to the States at that time, in particular, to California b-boys/breakdancers. The video showed Nunes as well as a French b-boy who executed a move very similar to the modern airflare. Meanwhile, and soon after the following dancers had performed moves similar before the continuous airflare was established:

- Jazzy J of the Renegades performed a hopping flare in which both hands left the ground.
- Pilot of Soul Swift performed the airhalo a variation of the halo but without the head touching the ground.
- Kujo of Soul Control performed a complete airtrack and could throw his body in a circular path.
- B-Boy Ivan of Style Elements executed airflare in combination with many moves. Ivan popularized the move for early generations.
- Babak of Soul Control performed and pioneered the electro (in 1996), a predecessor to the elbow airflares, which he also performed.
- Iron Monkey of Abstract Flavors (his crew at that time, then known as Sean Supreme) performed a complete airflare during a battle against Soul Control.
- Megaman of Soul Control responded to Iron Monkey at the aforementioned battle with another airflare (also introduced many new combos). Megaman introduced many new combinations with the airflare.
- Inferno of Soul Control performed elbow airflares and could combine them with other moves, including windmills and flares.
- Flex of Abstract Flavors could execute the airflare.
- Charles of Climax / Soul Control executed the airflare in many competitions, popularizing the study of this maneuver.
- Ibrahim Dembele of legendary French crew, 'The Family' invented an advanced variation of the Airflare; Airflare 1.5. By early 1998 he had already perfected this move. Notable footage exists online such as a cypher performance uploaded to The Family's Youtube channel as well as during the famed battle between The Family and Rock Force at Battle of the Year 1998.
- Legendary Houston pioneer, Nightcrawler is often credited for further advancing the Airflare 1.5. His footage from 'Out for Fame' in 1999 sent shockwaves through Europe and Korea where many found influence in Nightcrawler's combinations and dynamic movement.

== First documented continuous airflares ==
Pablo Flores of Climax / Soul Control successfully performed continuous airflares, completing the manifestation of the move. It is this modern form of the airflare that Morgan Hamm introduced into gymnastics, after learning it from the b-boy community. There was a change.org petition created by Curtis Hedges of the OBS Group to influence the United States Olympic Committee to recognize Pablo Flores, and more recently Lui Guerrero as the first person in history to perform continuous airflares.

== Terminology ==
The term airflare was coined by members of Soul Control, including Barmak Badaei, Babak Badaei, Carlos Alvarez (Inferno), and Jacob Lyons (Kujo), to distinguish the move from the airtrack. The key observation was that the addition of the circular rotation made the move far easier to execute than the airtrack – there are very few documented cases of continuous airtracks, however, the earliest documented case of continuous airtracks is of Kujo of Soul Control.

The European terms airtwist, airtwister, and airtwista pre-date the word airflare. Both refer to the same technical move; however, the modern form of the move is better known today as airflare worldwide.

The hyphenated air-flare and spaced air flare are occasionally seen, but the term is usually fully compounded to produce airflare, which is consistent with other move names, e.g., windmill and headspin.

== Differences between airflares and airtracks ==
Airflares and airtracks are often confused. Here is a historical interpretation:

- Here is an airtrack to windmill – not an airflare
- Here is an airflare to windmill (not an airtrack)

The first video is at least a couple of years older than the second. In the first, little rotation can be seen is in the plane parallel to the floor; the rotation is strictly around the axis of the body. When these moves were developed, the airtrack was easier to conceive yet much harder to do continuously. The airflare is ultimately a more technical move, making it easier to do them continuously. Today there are many varieties of airflare, including a continuous one-handed variation; yet there is no known documented case of more than three airtracks – where there is a lack of a flare like swinging while drilling in the air around the body – done continuously.

== Popularization ==
While all of the documented cases mentioned herein help popularize the move, especially B-Boy Ivan, there is in particular a battle between Soul Control and a temporary super crew known as the Flying Tortillas. This "battle" catalyzed its visibility and took the move mainstream. Many other b-boys would popularize the move in the coming years, notably Moy and Boy of Havikoro (from Texas), and Benny and Tuff-Kid of Basel City (from Switzerland).
