= Handstand =

Hand-balancing posture in gymnastics and hatha yoga

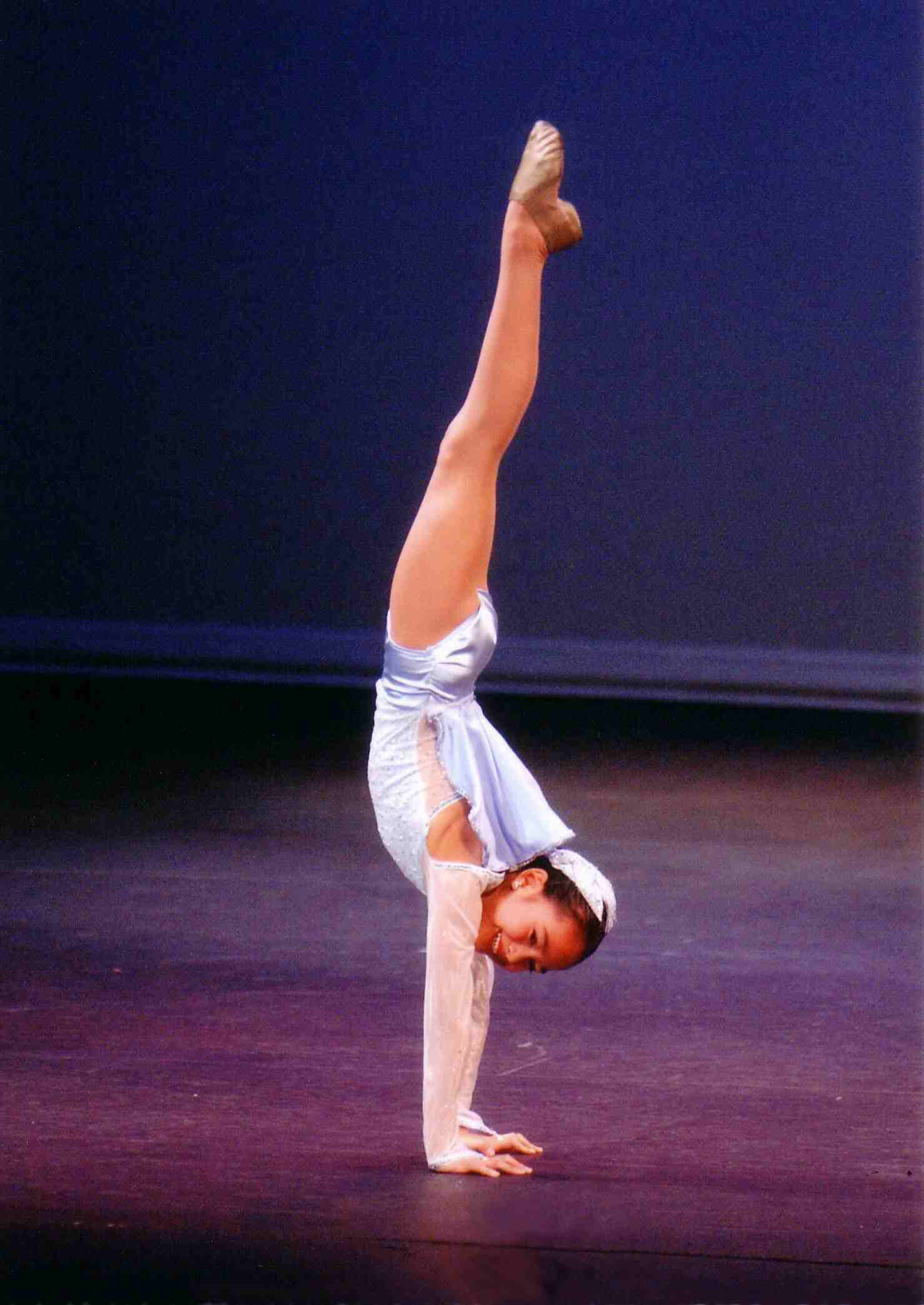
An acro dancer pauses in a precision handstand before handwalking across the stage.

A handstand is the act of supporting the body in a stable, inverted vertical position by balancing on the hands. In a basic handstand, the body is held straight with arms and legs fully extended, with hands spaced approximately shoulder-width apart and the legs together. There are many variations of handstands, all of which require the performer to possess adequate balance and upper body strength.

== Kinematics ==
Handstands use the wrist flexor muscles as well as the anterior deltoid, pectoralis major, latissimus dorsi, biceps brachii, and trapezius descendens. It is considered demanding in terms of both the muscle and joint requirement.

According to a 2017 study most handbalancers use wrist movement to maintain balance in a handstand.

Another study found that handbalancers who were also expert gymnasts had better coordination than those at an intermediate level of gymnastics. More advanced practitioners also altered their center of pressure less to change the center of mass when making corrections to handstand position.

Handstand moves involving an especially high amount of strength include the press handstand and handstand push-up.

== Types of activities that use handstands ==
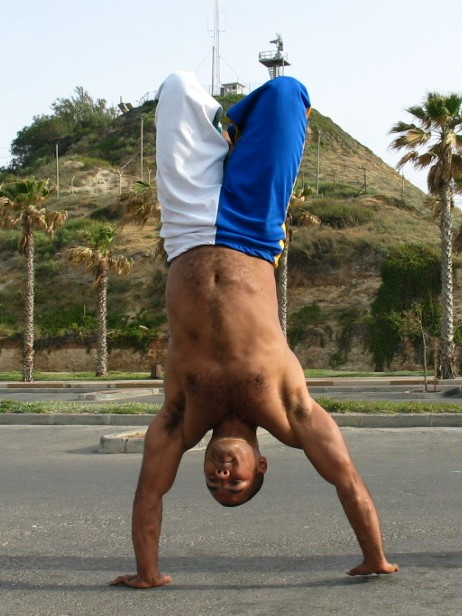
Capoeira handstand with bent legs

Handstands are performed in many athletic activities, including acro dance, cheerleading, circus, yoga, capoeira, calisthenics, swimming and gymnastics. Some variation of a handstand is performed on every gymnastic apparatus, and many tumbling skills pass through a handstand position during their execution. Breakdancers incorporate handstands in freezes and kicks.

Handstands are known by various other names. In modern yoga as exercise, the handstand is called Adho Mukha Vrksasana. In capoeira it is named bananeira.

=== Yoga ===
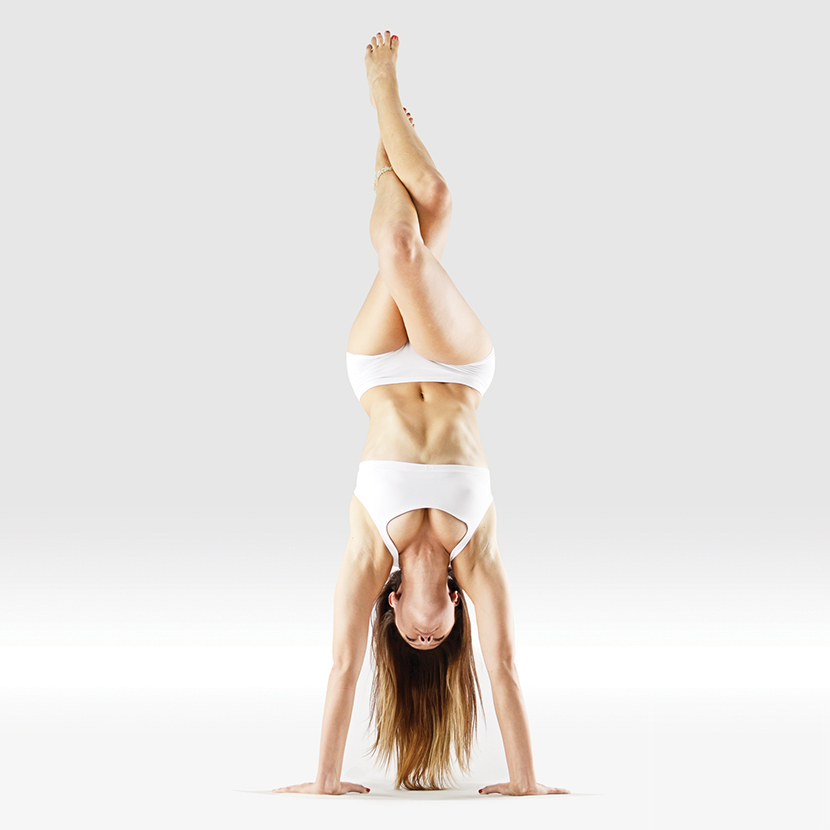
Adho Mukha Vrikshasana with legs in Garudasana (Eagle pose)

In modern yoga as exercise, the handstand is among the inverted poses; it is known as Adho Mukha Vrksasana, Downward-facing Tree Pose. In traditional hatha yoga in the 18th and 19th centuries, the Vyayāmadipike, which calls it the "second gardam", and the Śrītattvanidhi use the handstand in a sequence involving touching the nose to the ground; the Haṭhābhyāsapaddhati calls this Syenasana, meaning hawk pose.

=== Swimming ===
Swimmers often perform underwater handstands as a stunt, with their heads, arms, and bodies underwater and their legs and feet extended above the surface, often having games or contests with the winner being the person who can remain in an underwater handstand the longest.

Armstand dives—a category found in competitive platform diving—are dives that begin with a handstand.

=== Gymnastics ===
There are two basic handstand styles in modern gymnastics: curved-back and straight-back. Straight-back style is employed when the aesthetics of straight body lines are desired and feasible. In many cases (e.g., when a handstand is being performed in conjunction with a gymnastic apparatus), however, the curved-back style is preferred as it offers superior control of the legs and torso over balance. In all cases, balance is maintained by shifting body weight towards the fingers or the heel of the hand.

All basic gymnastic handstands have these characteristics:

- Straight arms with hands placed on the ground approximately shoulder-width apart.
- Straight legs, held together.
- Pointed toes so as to continue the lines of the legs.

In addition, straight-back handstands have these characteristics:

- Tucked head (face pointed forward) as if standing upright.
- Straight spine, with hips pushed forward. If performed while lying flat, this would cause the small of the back to contact ground.

== See also ==
- Hand walking
- Head stand
- List of asanas
