= Flare (acrobatic move) =

Acrobatic move

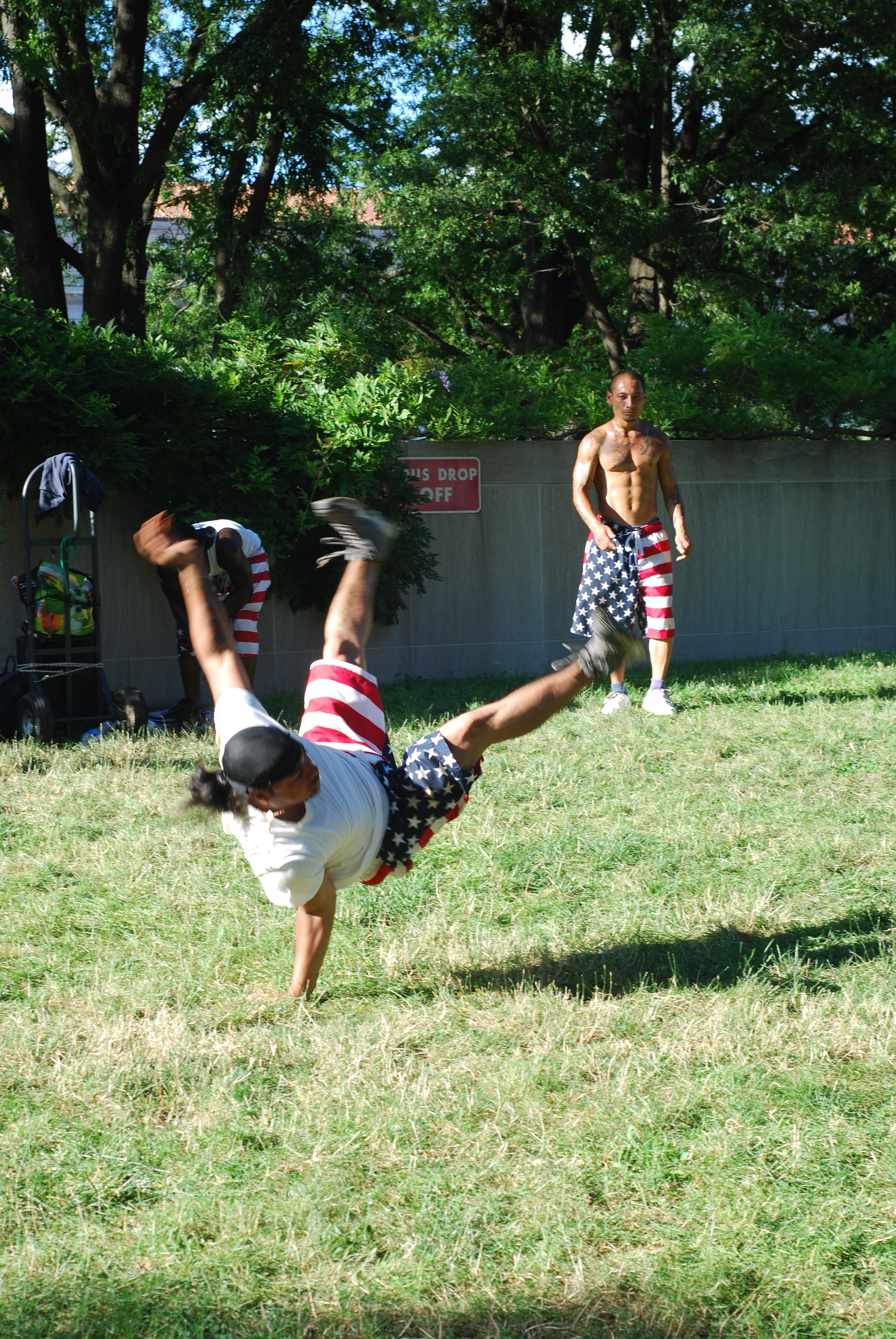
B-boy street performer doing air chair in Washington D.C.

The flare is an acrobatic move in which the performer alternates balancing the torso between either arm while swinging the legs beneath in continuous circles. It is a fundamental b-boying or bgirl power move, and in gymnastics it may be performed on a pommel horse or during the floor exercise. The move is commonly spelled flair in gymnastics and further may be called a "Thomas flair" after its originator, Kurt Thomas.

== Step by step ==
The left leg begins about 10 inches behind the right (not lined up). If the breaker already has momentum, he or she quickly puts down his left hand close to the left leg facing the fingers away from the body, towards the left. Next, the left leg is swung around as hard as possible while doing a jump. The breaker is prepared to put down the right hand. All of the breaker's weight shifts to the right arm, and he or she kicks the left leg up as high as possible. The right leg swings under the left and then the left hand comes down in front, such that both hands are now in front. Arching his or her back and without touching the ground, the breaker kicks the right leg up again and swings the left leg around low for another rotation.

A progression for this move would be double leg circles on a mushroom (similar to a pommel horse but rounded and lower down). This consists of his or her legs rotating around the mushroom 360 degrees elevated roughly 40 cm off the floor with nothing but his or her hands touching the mushroom.

=== Airflares ===
The Airflare, sometimes also called an Airtrack, is an advanced move that is similar in concept to a Halo, also known as Headtracks or just tracks. This is because they share the feel when it comes to piking your legs and swinging them in between the hand switch. While performing an Air Flare, the breaker is inverted with his torso at a 45-degree angle to the floor. (angle can differ. the smaller the angle, the greater the difficulty). his legs in a V-shape, and his arms straight. The hands are the only body part that touch the floor as the move is being performed. The bboy or bgirl whips their legs, then arms around so that he travels in a circular path. Air Flares can also be referred to as Air Tracks: however, Air Tracks was originally a single 360 spin in the air that would be a transition move linking to another. Later, people would start doing Air flares in the manner of a continuous Air track, rendering both names to be basically the same move, since the difference in execution is so minimal.

== Sequence ==
Four rotations of the chair flares:

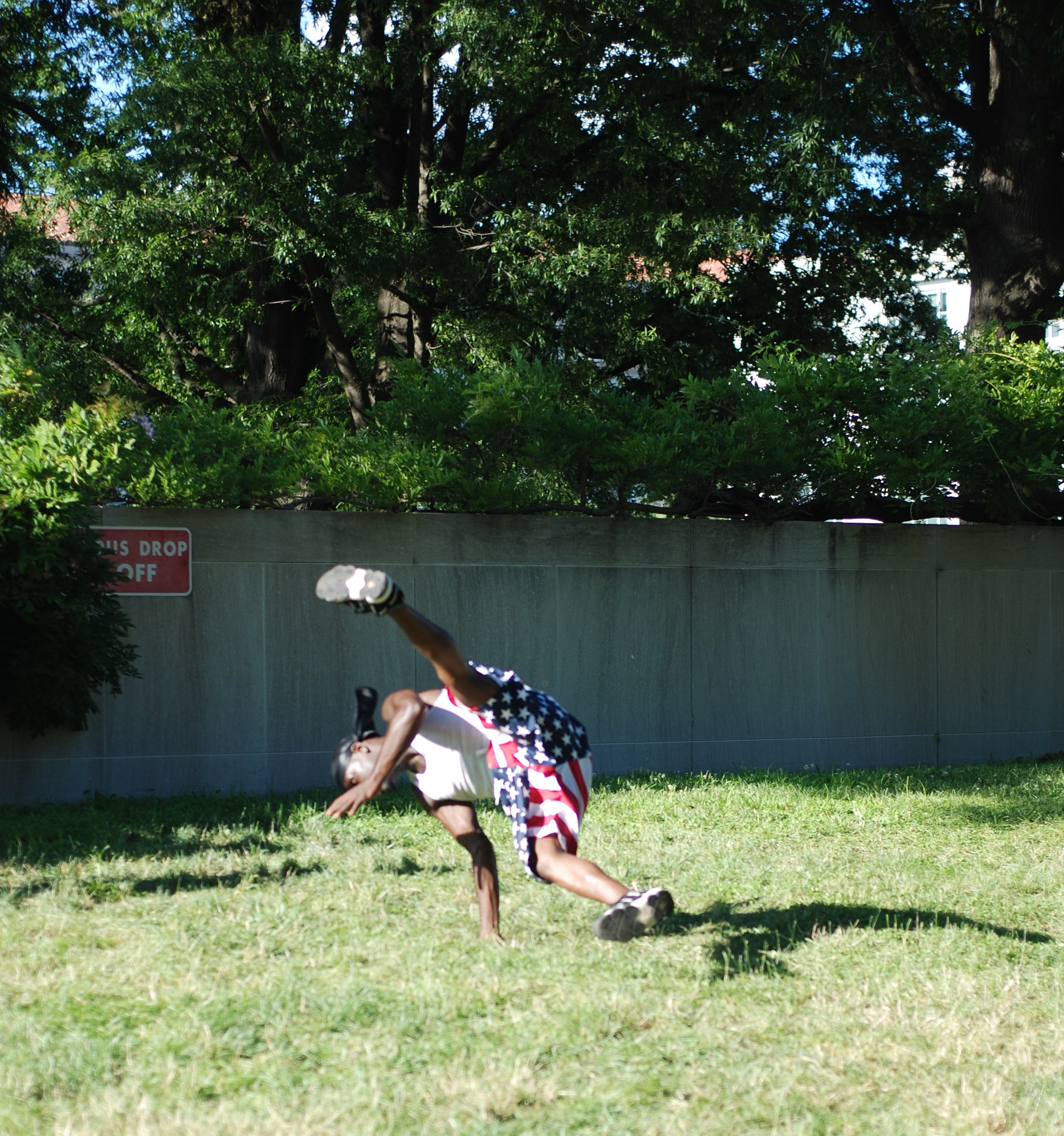

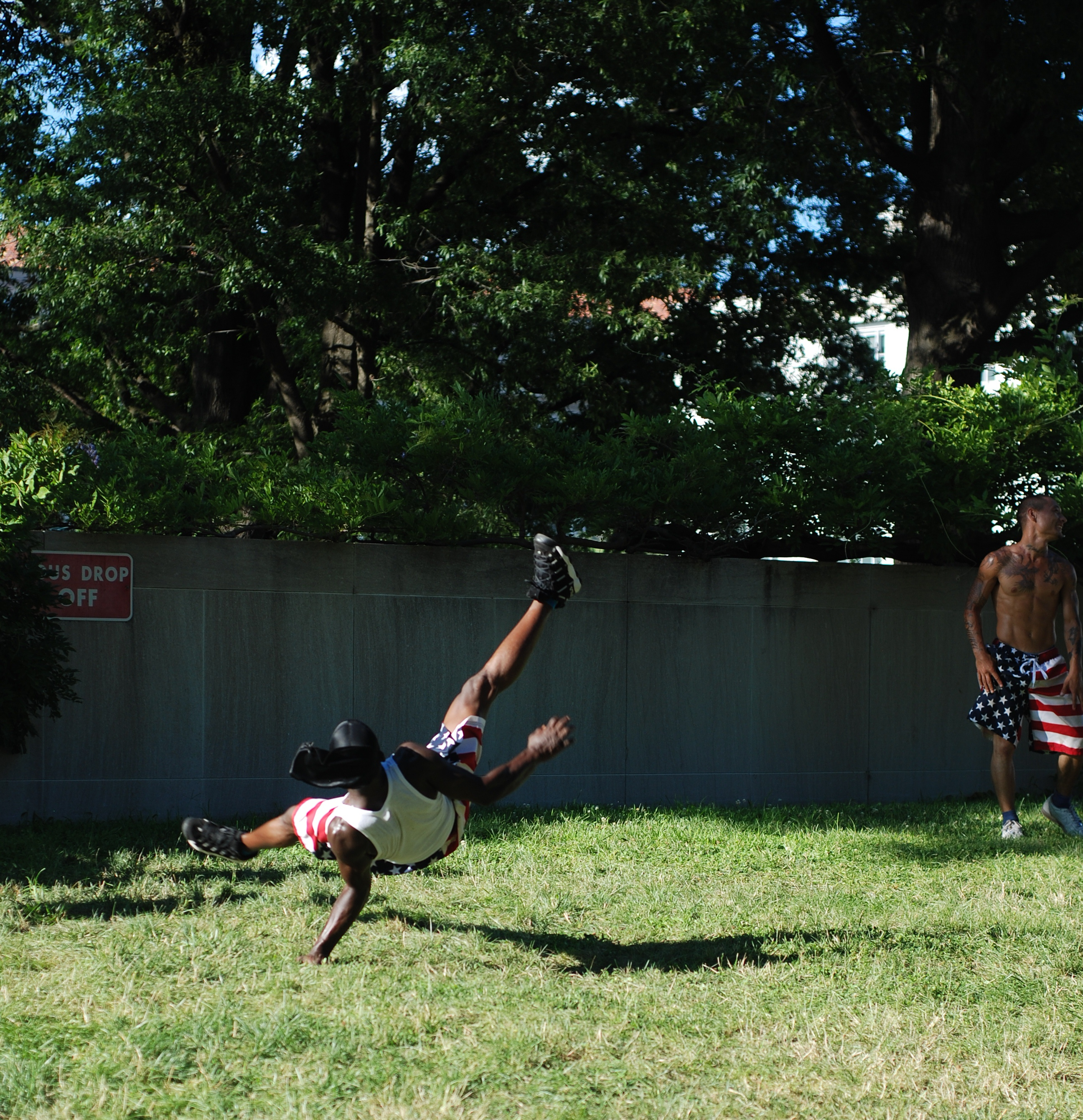

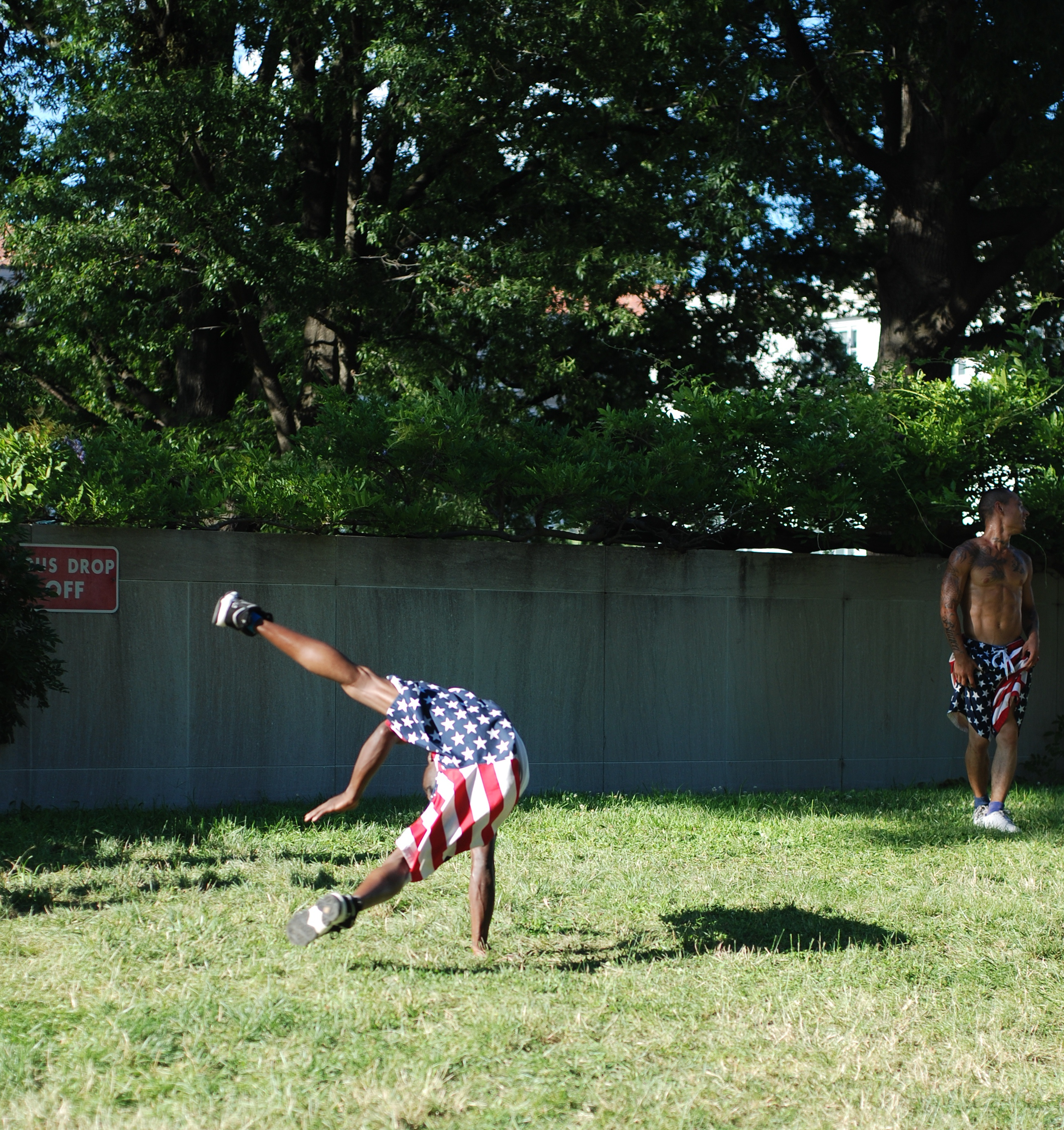

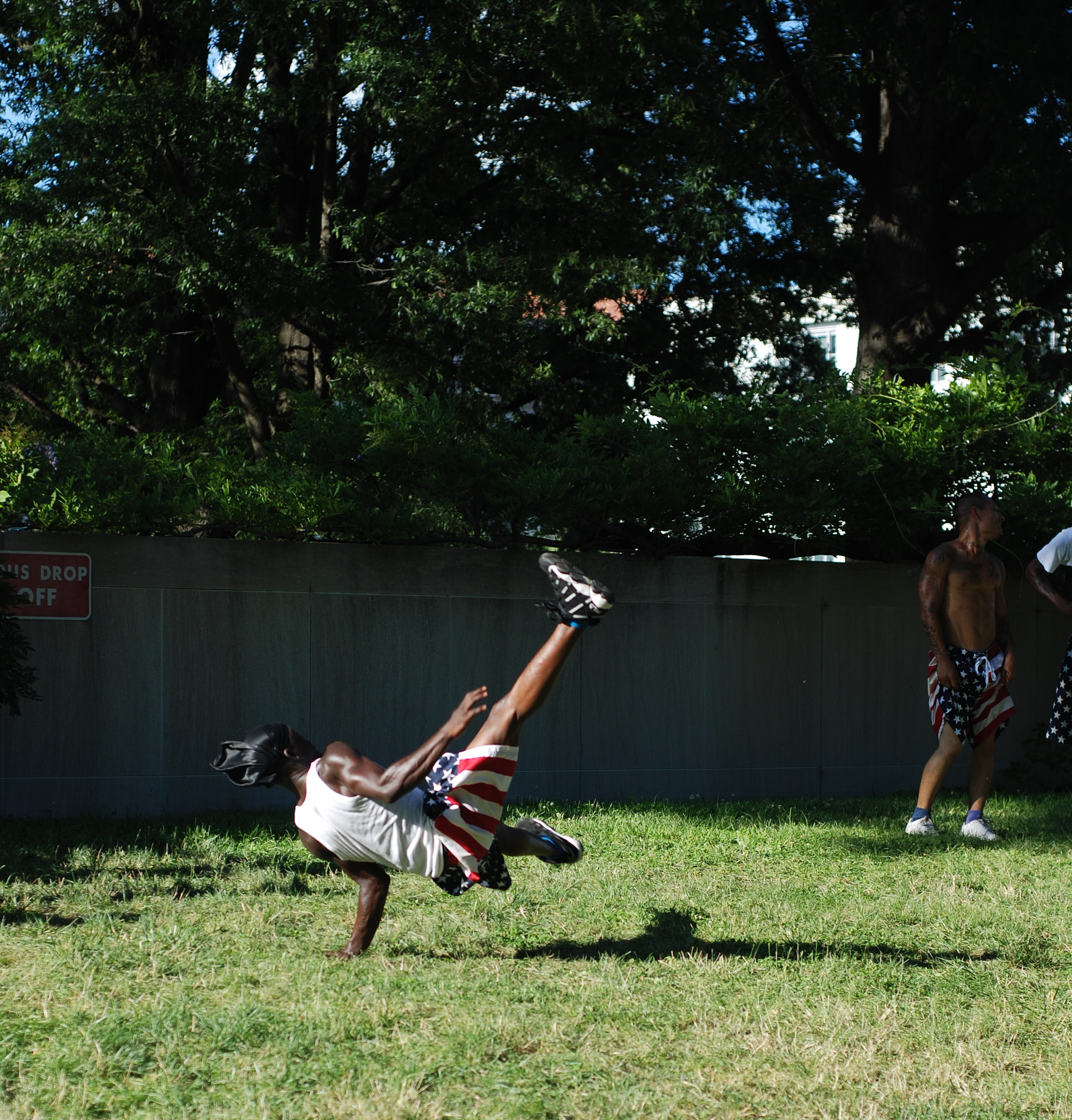

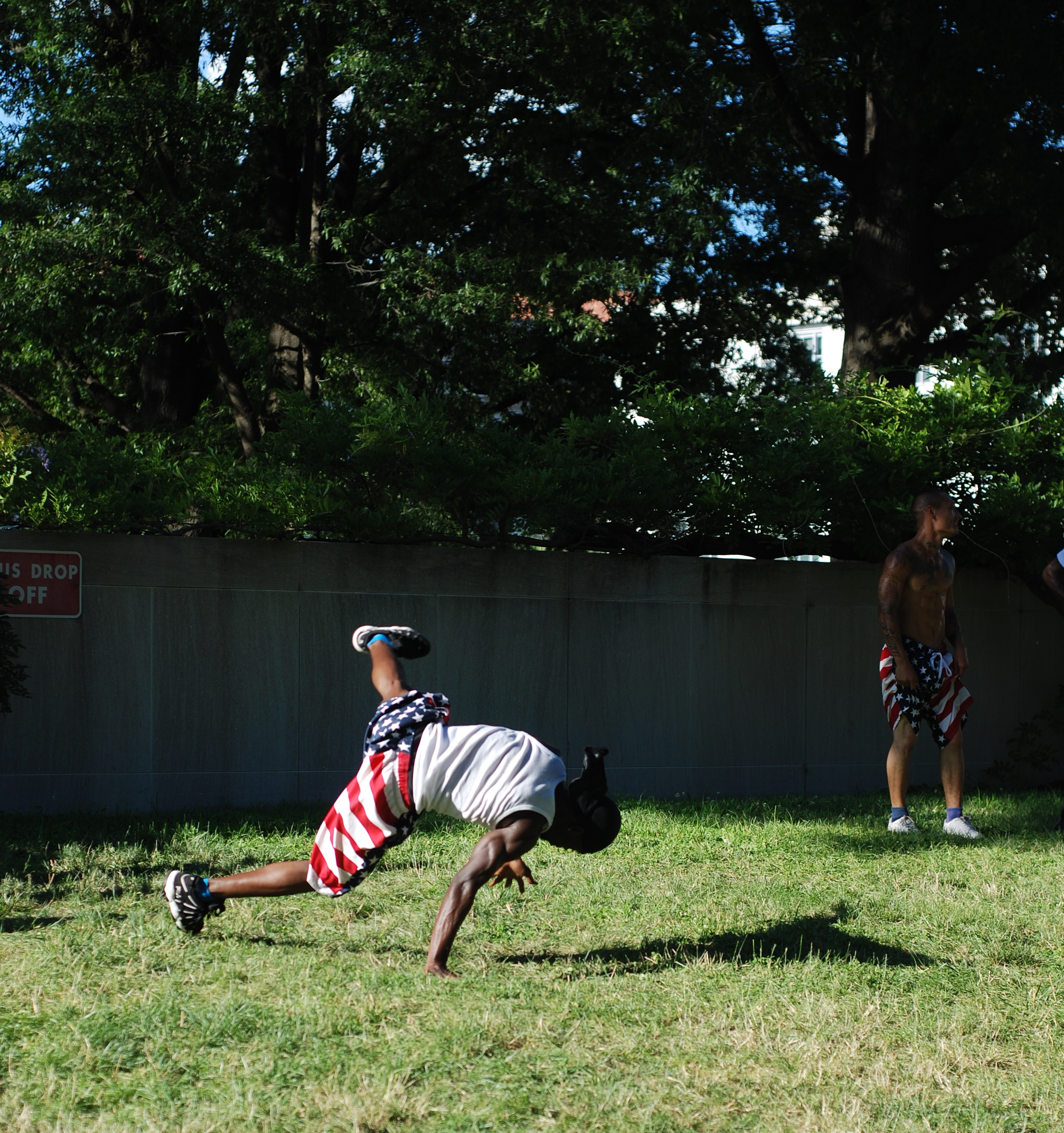

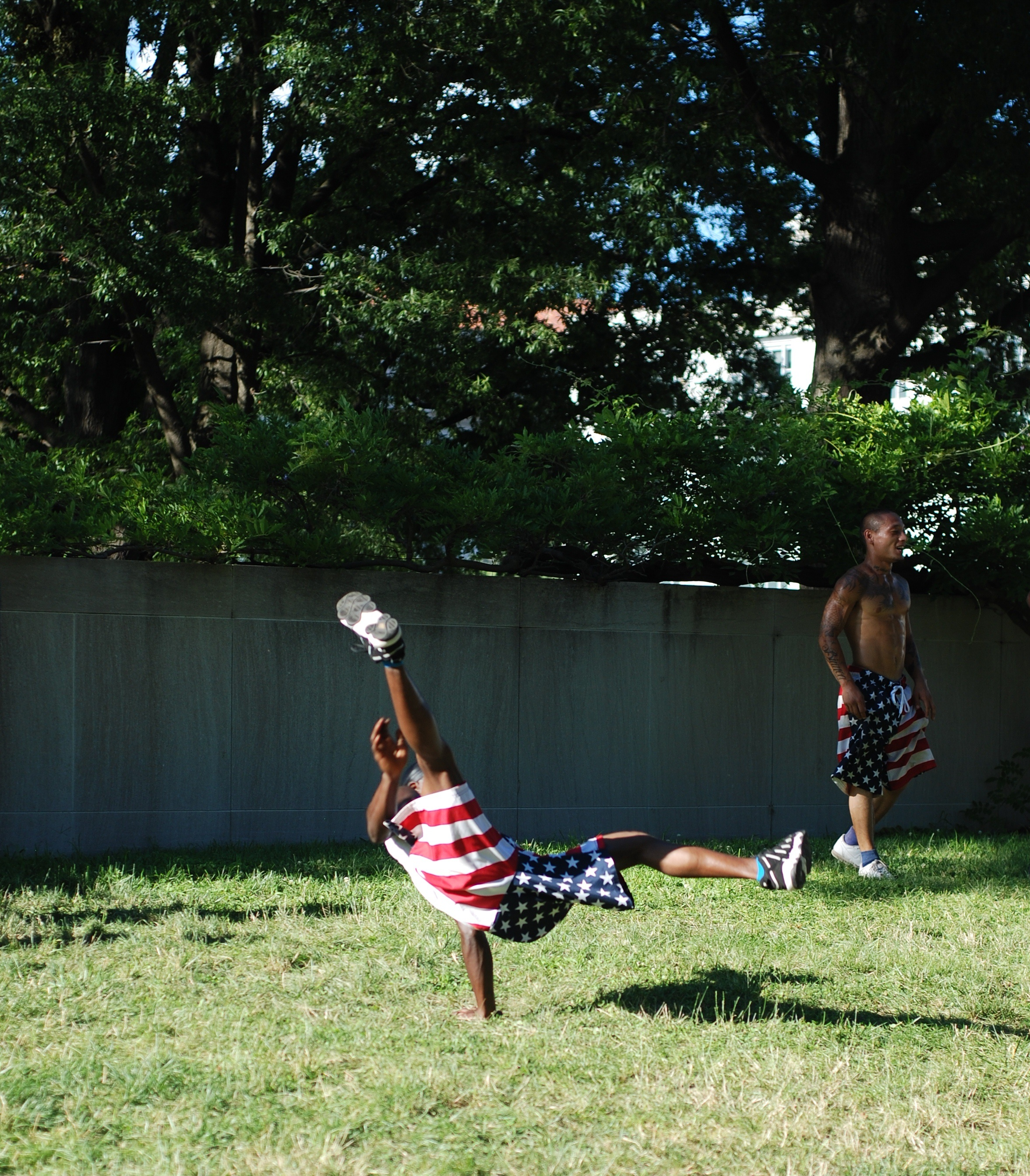

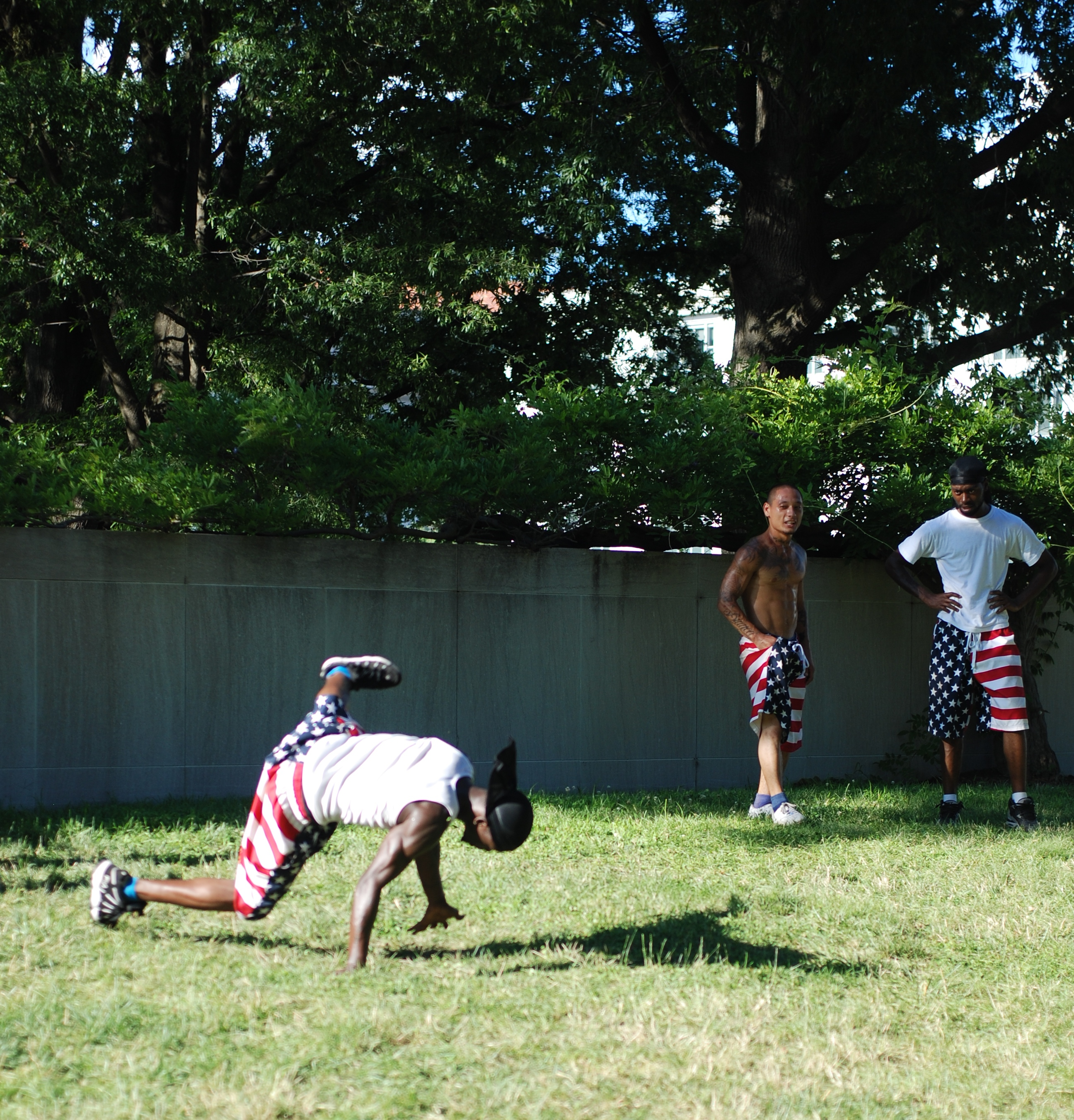

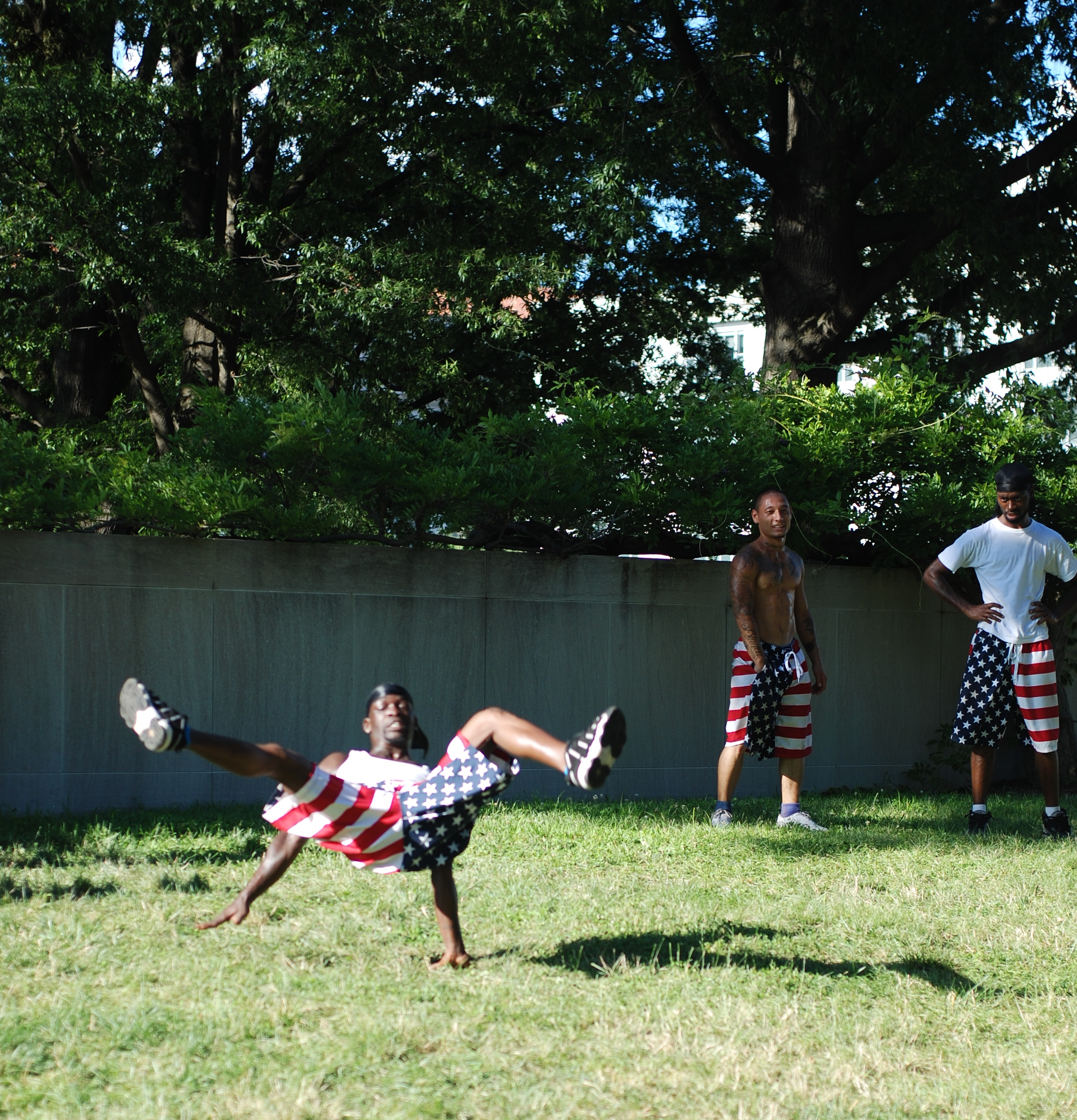
