= Suicide (breakdancing move) =

A suicide is a sudden drop to a breakdancer's back. They are frequently employed as take out moves burn moves and freeze. Ideally, suicides are very flashy and painful-looking moves. Good suicides elicit exclamations of "ouch" from onlookers and can even be comical to a certain degree. They usually end with the breaker perfectly still, enhancing the image that they have injured themselves. Despite appearances, different training and techniques are used to minimize the pain of suicides. A suicide is also used to demonstrate a possible ending to a conflict that groups may have with each other.

Invention of the move has been credited to Frosty Freeze of Rock Steady Crew.

== Suicides compared to freezes ==
Suicides have elements in common with freezes. However, while both suicides and freezes end with a cessation of movement, there is a large distinction to be made. Freezes are precisely controlled techniques meant to draw attention to the actual frozen position. Suicides draw attention while in motion, convey an impression of being dangerously out-of-control, and often leave the breaker lying prone on the floor in an unremarkable position.

== Common suicides ==
- The Suicide is a version where the breaker does a front flip and lands on their back.
- The Handspring Suicide involves the breaker running and jumping into a front handspring then flopping down flat on their back.
- The Baby Suicide is a stationary version of the handspring suicide. From a handstand, the breaker simply falls onto their back. The arms can be suddenly jerked away to enhance the effect.
- The Reverse Suicide involves a back hand spring or back flip landing on the knees first then back
