= Headspin =

Athletic move in capoeira and breakdancing

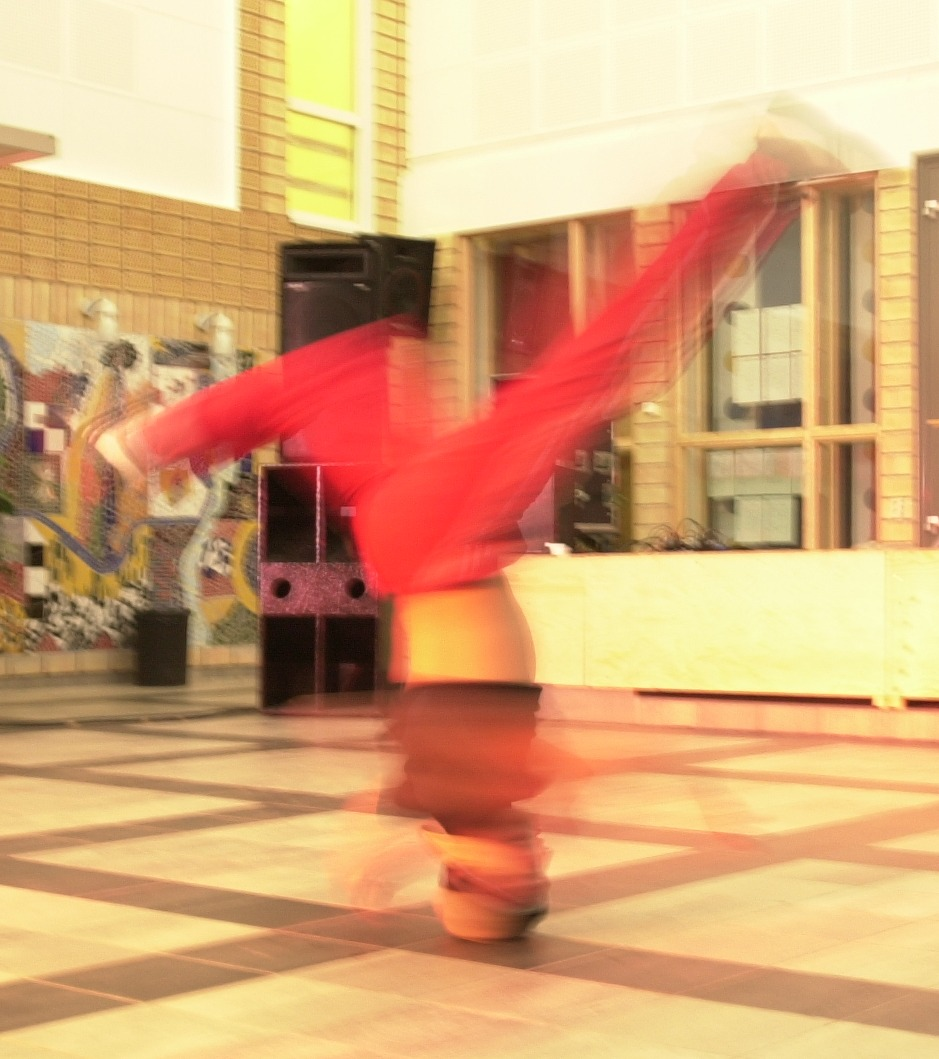
Headspin

A headspin is an athletic move in which a person balances on their head while rotating around the vertical axis of their body, usually without any other form of support. The move is commonly employed in the Afro-Brazilian martial art, Capoeira and in breakdancing. Though b-boy Kid Freeze is sometimes credited with having invented the headspin, the first known footage of the move is seen in the 1933 film, Wild Boys of the Road. One of the film's protagonists Edward 'Eddie' Smith, played by Frankie Darro, performs a Headspin at the 67 minute mark. There is also an older video featuring a headspin "A Street Arab" Thomas A. Edison, INC April 21, 1898 in which a preadolescent boy, dressed like a street urchin, performs acrobatic stunts for the camera. The dancer, Olav Thorshaug, performed Norwegian hallingdans shows in the United States of America around 1910–1920, incorporating the headspin in his dance.

The first part of a frozen headspin is known as a hatstand.
