= Freeze (breakdancing move) =

Breakdancing technique

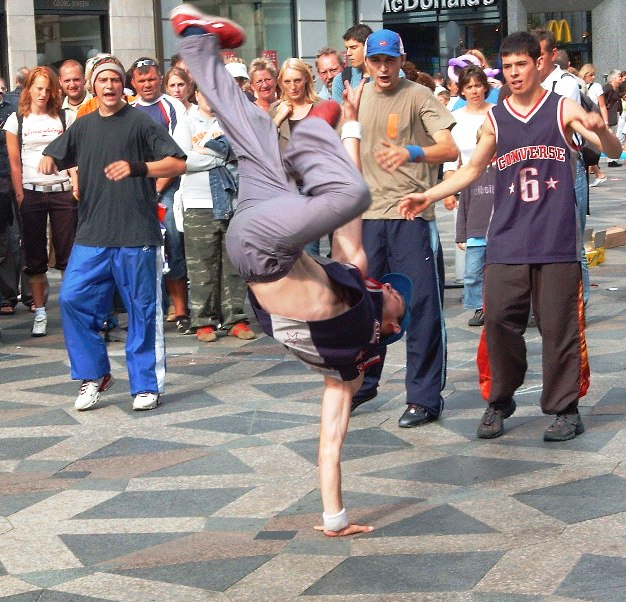
A B-Boy performing a one-handed freeze

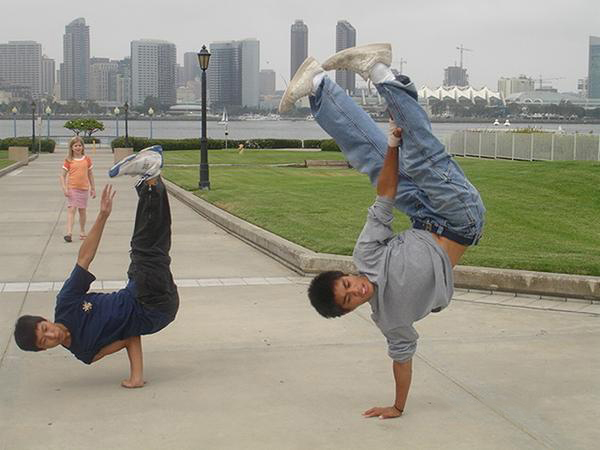
San Diego B-Boys demonstrate an airchair (left) and pike (right)

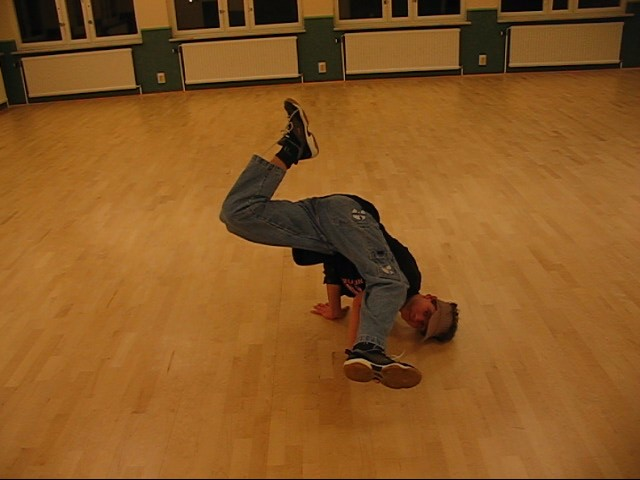
Baby freeze

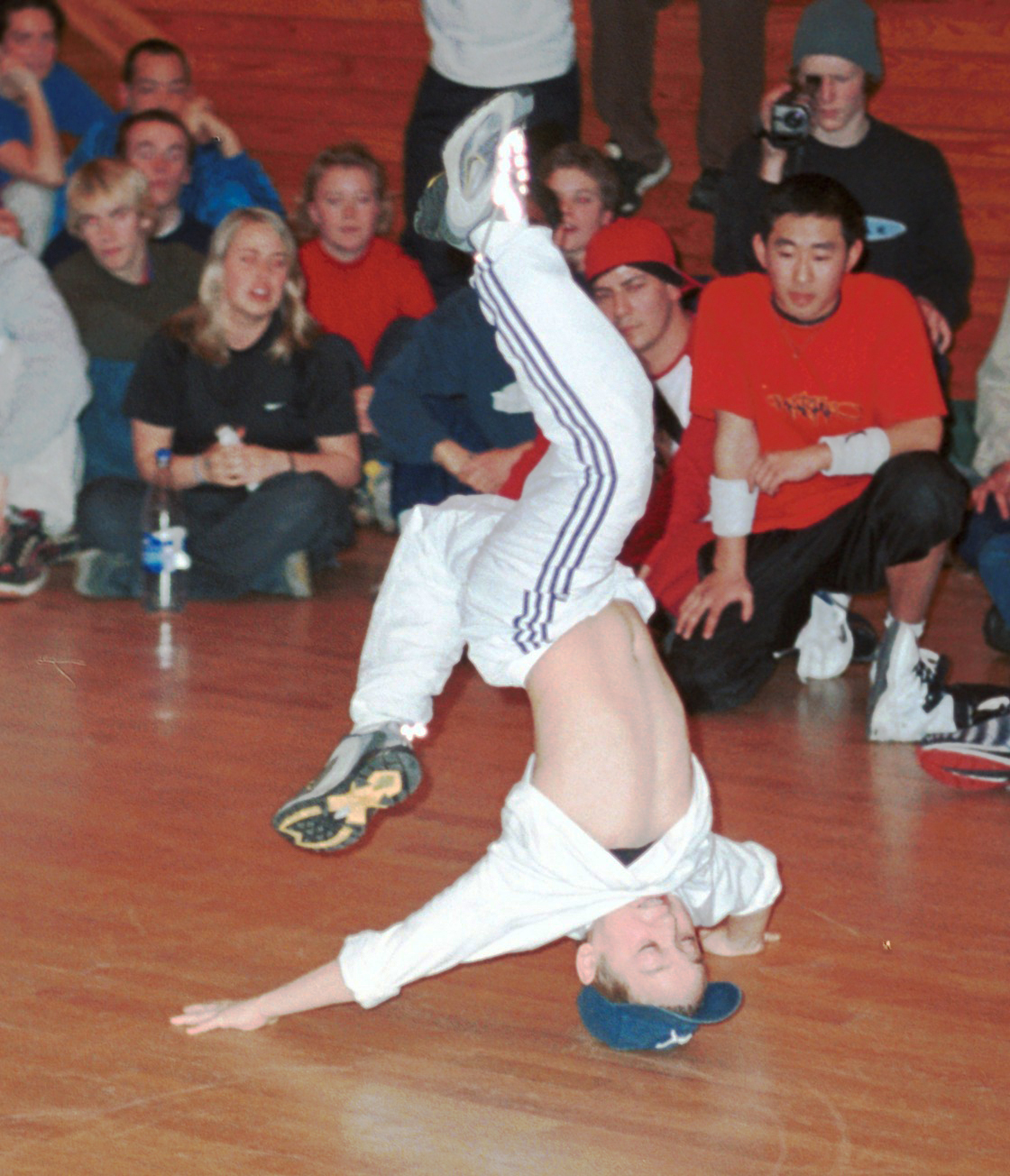
Hollowback freeze

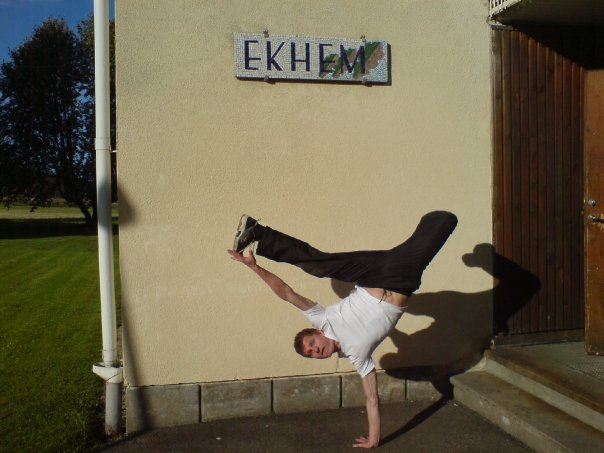
L-kick

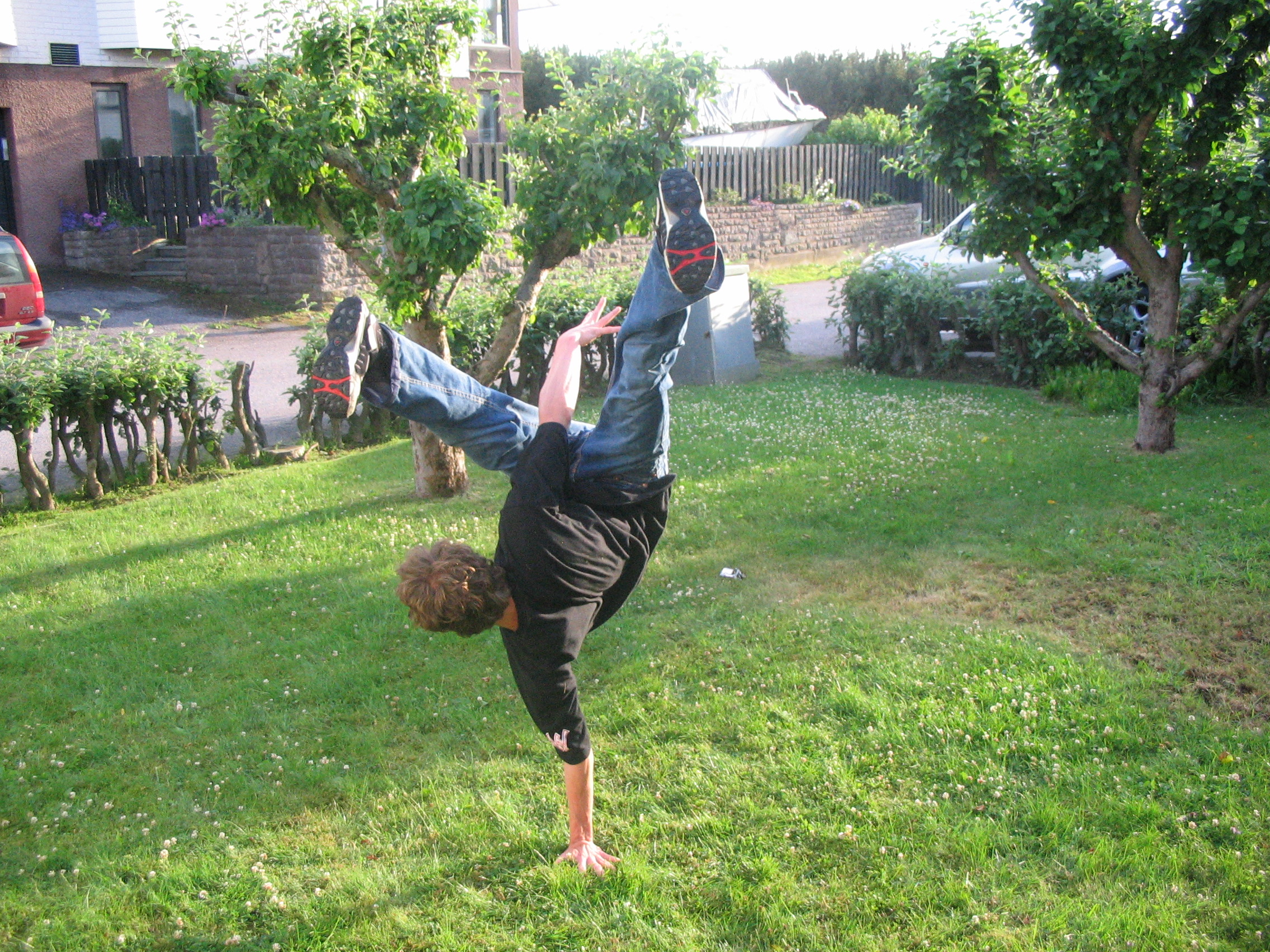
V-kick

A freeze is a b-boying technique that involves halting all body motion, often in an interesting or balance-intensive pose, for a few seconds. It is implied that the position is hit and held from motion as if freezing in motion, or into ice. Freezes often incorporate various twists and distortions of the body into stylish and often difficult positions.

Spins are often combined with freezes, and the spins are usually done in the form of highkicks. Various handstands ("inverts", "Nikes", and "pikes") can be frozen, and skilled breakers sometimes incorporate the technique of threading into handstands by forming a loop with one arm and leg, then "threading" the other leg in and out of the loop.

== Variants ==
There are many different variations of freezes. A common naming convention categorizes freezes based on what part of the body is in contact with the ground. First Freezes were chin freaks, Tracks, Splits, deadman freeze, chairs. Thus a "headstand freeze" is done with only the breaker's head touching the ground, and so forth for handstand, forearm, elbow, and shoulder freezes. Also, "one-handed" or "two-handed" can be added to make any name more descriptive. Less intuitively named freezes include:

- Planche - A freeze with your body straddled parallel over the ground, while arms are straight, you use your strength to hold your body weight.
- Baby Freeze - The hands are used for balance, with the nearest side of your waist on one elbow and a knee on the other, sometimes swapping leg placement.
  - Airbaby - A freeze with the knee resting on the elbow of the supporting arm.
- Chair Freeze - A freeze while you're lying down arched to the floor with the arm stabbed into the back to support the body.
  - Airchair - A chair freeze without the head or feet on the floor, usually facing the ceiling, with leeway for many leg variations.
  - Elbow Airchair - A chair freeze, performed with hand at the back and that elbow pointed at the ground. Hands and feet are removed from the floor to complete the freeze.
    - Double Airchair/Recliners - An Airchair freeze, having both arms in a stabbed position at the back. Only Contortionists and other extremely flexible individuals could be able to perform this move. It is very dangerous, and is not performed often.
- Handglide Freeze - Similar to the Turtle freeze, except only one elbow is stabbed into the abs, the other is out to the side of the body and is either placed on the ground or held above it.
- Hollowback - A more difficult freeze. It is basically a bridge with feet not touching the floor. There are many variations performed from a handstand, headstand, or on the elbows.
- Invert - an inverted hollowback freeze. instead of making a bridge you crunch in your face to your legs so it makes a v shapes as in to "invert" the hollowback.
- O Freeze- a hollowback with an extreme arch the feet touch the bboy's elbows, this resembles an 'O' shape.
- Pike - A freeze with one hand planted on the ground while the entire body is perpendicular to the floor with both feet held high to the air.
- Turtle Freeze - Both arms are bent in front of the chest with the elbows stabbing into either the abs or surrounding area. All the weight is placed onto the hands and the rest of the body is suspended above the ground. See float.
- Birthday Elbow- a freeze on the elbow wherein the bboy's head rests on his hand, the body is horizontal, facing the ground.
- Flag-standing on one hand while facing the side and punched the other hand forward
- L-kick-standing on one hand while crotch and bend one leg while holding the end of a straight leg with the other hand
- V-kick-balancing two hands and kicking feet V-shaped on
- Y-freeze-standing on one hand and balance while opening leg shape 'Y'.
- Shoulder freeze-balance the body using the shoulder while making free style legs.
