= Cachaça (nightclub) =

Defunct nightclub in Manhattan, New York

Coordinates: 40.76140°N 73.95998°W

Cachaça was a nightclub located at 403 East 62nd Street in Manhattan. The upscale Brazilian-themed night spot opened in March 1977, located above the Hippopotamus disco. Both were owned by businessman Olivier Coquelin, nicknamed "Disco Daddy," who had opened Le Club, the first American discotheque, in 1960, followed by Cheetah in 1966.

Promoting its opening, Coquelin said "There hasn't been a club like this one since the Blue Angel, where Streisand got her start." The decor was by architect Lawrence Peabody, who said "I've made Cachaça a simple bronze-mirrored box with lots of comfortable seats, no paintings, photographs or anything- so it can be crowded with colorful people. They're the decoration." Among the guests in its opening weeks were former New York mayor John Lindsay and his wife Mary, Broadway producer Michael Butler, Vanessa Redgrave, Rupert Murdock, and Mick and Bianca Jagger.

Entertainment included live and recorded music, with a 1977 listing in New York Magazine describing the ambience as "Mirrors, marble-topped tables, potted palms, gray-velvet chesterfield sofas, and Latin music," and announcing "singer Joyce Silveira with dancing to the Helcio Milito nine-piece band, who play popular Brazilian music, every night from 10 to 4 am." Capoeira mestres Jelon Vieira and Loremil Machado performed a stage show weekly for "four or five years." The ballroom dance team of David Van Hamilton and Susan Silva performed regularly for two years.

While Olivier Coquelin jokingly denied to Andy Warhol's Interview Magazine that any "striptease" would be taking place at Cachaça, by early 1980, he had decided to open "Chez Elle at Hippopotamus," featuring male strippers. A notice in Back Stage directed "attractive male gymnasts, dancers and he-man types" to auditions at Cachaça. An article in Variety emphasized that the show was intended for a female audience, and said that "unaccompanied men will not be admitted until after the last of three shows at 11 pm."
