= Disco =

Music genre and subculture

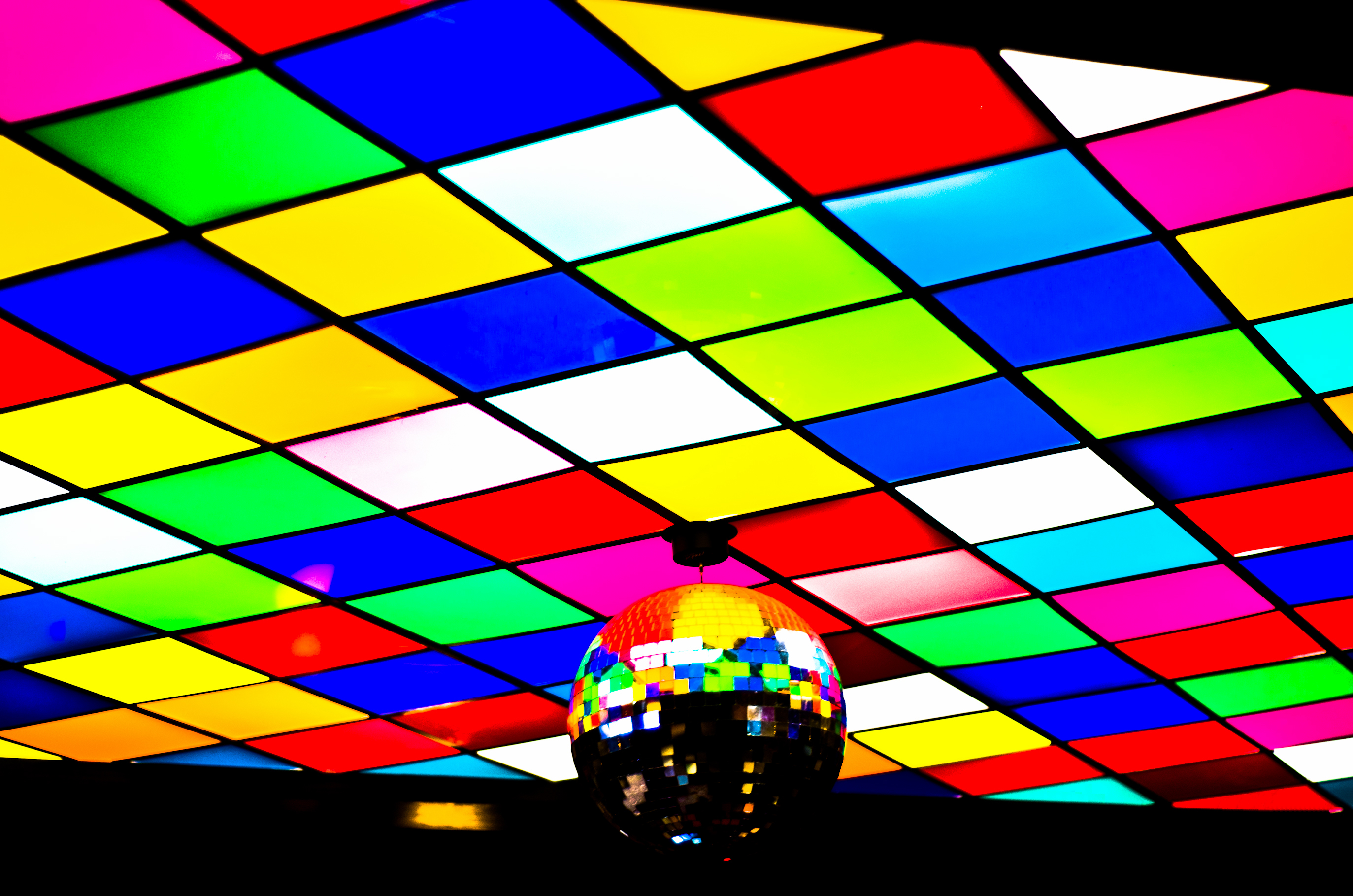
- Ceiling of a discothèque
- Stylistic origins: Philadelphia soul; funk; psychedelic soul
- Cultural origins: Late 1960s – early 1970s, Philadelphia, Baltimore, and New York City
- Typical instruments: Electric guitar; Bass guitar; drum kit; Conga; Tambourine; Maraca; Trumpet; Saxophone; Jazz guitar
- Derivative forms: Europop; dance-pop; house; post-disco; post-punk; hip-hop; new wave; synth-pop; acid jazz

Subgenres
- Italo disco; Cosmic disco; Eurodisco; Space disco; Hi-NRG; Disco polo; Nu-disco

Fusion genres
- Dance-punk; Dance-rock; French house; Disco-pop; Funky house; Future funk; Disco-rap

Regional scenes
- Europe (Italy; Poland); Philippines; United States

Local scenes
- Los Angeles; Miami; Montreal; New York City; Baltimore; Philadelphia; San Francisco; Washington

Other topics
- Discothèques; list of artists; old-school hip-hop

Disco is a genre of dance music and a subculture that emerged in the late 1960s from the United States' urban nightlife scene. Its sound is typified by four-on-the-floor beats, syncopated basslines, string sections, brass and horns, electric pianos, synthesizers, and electric rhythm guitars.

Discothèques as a venue were mostly a French invention, imported to the United States with the opening of Le Club, a members-only restaurant and nightclub located at 416 East 55th Street in Manhattan, by French expatriate Olivier Coquelin, on New Year's Eve 1960.

Disco music as a genre started as a mixture of music from venues popular among African Americans, Latino Americans, and Italian Americans in New York City (especially Brooklyn), Philadelphia, and Baltimore during the late 1960s to the mid-to-late 1970s. Disco can be seen as a reaction by the 1960s counterculture to both the dominance of rock music and the stigmatization of dance music at the time. Several dance styles were developed in the United States during the period of disco's popularity in the 1970s, including "the Bump", "the Hustle", "the Watergate", "the Continental", and "the Busstop".

During the 1970s, disco music was developed further, mainly by artists from the United States as well as from Europe. While performers garnered public attention, record producers working behind the scenes played an important role in developing the genre. By the late 1970s, most major U.S. cities had thriving disco club scenes, and DJs would mix dance records at clubs such as Studio 54 in Manhattan, a venue popular among celebrities. Nightclub-goers often wore expensive, extravagant outfits, consisting predominantly of loose, flowing pants or dresses for ease of movement while dancing. There was also a thriving drug subculture in the disco scene, particularly for drugs that would enhance the experience of dancing to the loud music and the flashing lights, such as cocaine and quaaludes, the latter being so common in disco subculture that they were nicknamed "disco biscuits". Disco clubs were also associated with promiscuity as a reflection of the sexual revolution of this era in popular history. Films such as Saturday Night Fever (1977) and Thank God It's Friday (1978) contributed to disco's mainstream popularity.

Disco declined as a major trend in popular music in the United States following the infamous Disco Demolition Night on July 12, 1979, and it continued to sharply decline in popularity in the U.S. during the early 1980s; however, it remained popular in Italy and some European countries throughout the 1980s, and during this time also started becoming trendy in places elsewhere including India and the Middle East, where aspects of disco were blended with regional folk styles such as ghazals and belly dancing. Disco would eventually become a key influence in the development of electronic dance music, house music, hip-hop, new wave, dance-punk, and post-disco. The style has had several revivals since the 1990s, and the influence of disco remains strong across American and European pop music. A revival has been underway since the early 2010s, coming to great popularity in the early 2020s. Modern day artists have continued the genre's popularity, bringing it to a whole new younger generation.

== Etymology ==
The term "disco" is shorthand for the word "discothèque" ("library of phonograph records") derived from "bibliothèque". The word "discotheque" had the same meaning in English in the 1950s. "Discothèque" became used in French for a type of nightclub in Paris, after they had resorted to playing records during the Nazi occupation in the early 1940s. Some clubs used it as their proper name. In 1960, it was also used to describe a Parisian nightclub in an English magazine.

The Oxford English Dictionary defines Discotheque as "A dance hall, nightclub, or similar venue where recorded music is played for dancing, typically equipped with a large dance floor, an elaborate system of flashing coloured lights, and a powerful amplified sound system." Its earliest example is use as the name of a particular venue in 1952, and other examples date from 1960 onwards. The entry is annotated as "Now somewhat dated". It defines Disco as "A genre of strongly rhythmical pop music mainly intended for dancing in nightclubs and particularly popular in the mid to late 1970s.", with use from 1975 onwards, describing the origin of the word as a shortened form of discotheque.

In the summer of 1964, a short sleeveless dress called the "discotheque dress" was briefly very popular in the United States. The earliest known use for the abbreviated form "disco" described this dress and has been found in The Salt Lake Tribune on July 12, 1964; Playboy magazine used it in September of the same year to describe Los Angeles nightclubs.

Vince Aletti was one of the first to describe disco as a sound or a music genre. He wrote the 13 September 1973 feature article Discotheque Rock '72: Paaaaarty! that appeared in Rolling Stone magazine.

== Musical characteristics ==
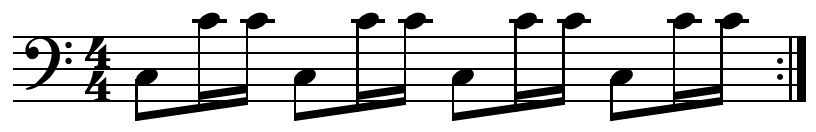
Disco bass pattern.

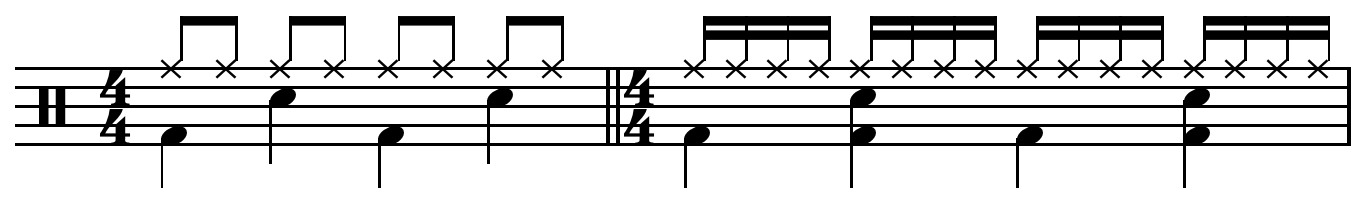
Rock & disco drum patterns: disco features greater subdivision of the beat, which is four-to-the-floor

The music typically layered soaring, often-reverberated vocals, often doubled by horns, over a background "pad" of electric pianos and "chicken-scratch" rhythm guitars played on an electric guitar. Lead guitar features less frequently in disco than in rock. "The "rooster scratch" sound is achieved by lightly pressing the guitar strings against the fretboard and then quickly releasing them just enough to get a slightly muted poker [sound] while constantly strumming very close to the bridge." Other backing keyboard instruments include the piano, electric organ (during early years), string synthesizers, and electromechanical keyboards such as the Fender Rhodes electric piano, Wurlitzer electric piano, and Hohner Clavinet. Donna Summer's 1977 song "I Feel Love", produced by Giorgio Moroder with a prominent Moog synthesizer on the beat, was one of the first disco tracks to use the synthesizer.

The rhythm is laid down by prominent, syncopated basslines (with heavy use of broken octaves, that is, octaves with the notes sounded one after the other) played on the bass guitar and by drummers using a drum kit, African/Latin percussion, and electronic drums such as Simmons and Roland drum modules.

Most disco songs have a steady four-on-the-floor beat set by a bass drum, a quaver or semi-quaver hi-hat pattern with an open hissing hi-hat on the off-beat, and a heavy, syncopated bass line. A recording error in the 1975 song "Bad Luck" by Harold Melvin & the Blue Notes where Earl Young's hi-hat was too loud in the recording is said to have established loud hi-hats in disco. Other Latin rhythms such as the rhumba, the samba, and the cha-cha-cha are also found in disco recordings, and Latin polyrhythms, such as a rhumba beat layered over a merengue, are commonplace. The quaver pattern is often supported by other instruments such as the rhythm guitar and may be implied rather than explicitly present.

Songs often use syncopation, which is the accenting of unexpected beats. In general, the difference between disco, or any dance song, and a rock or pop song is that in dance music the bass drum hits four to the floor, at least once a beat (which in 4/4 time is 4 beats per measure). Disco is further characterized by a 16th note division of the quarter notes (as shown in the second drum pattern in the picture above, after a typical rock drum pattern).

The orchestral sound usually known as "disco sound" relies heavily on string sections and horns playing linear phrases, in unison with the soaring, often reverberated vocals or playing instrumental fills, while electric pianos and chicken-scratch guitars create the background "pad" sound defining the harmony progression. Typically, all of the doubling of parts and use of additional instruments creates a rich "wall of sound". There are, however, more minimalist flavors of disco with reduced, transparent instrumentation.

Harmonically, disco music typically contains major and minor seven chords, which are found more often in jazz than pop music.

== Production ==
The "disco sound" was much more costly to produce than many of the other popular music genres from the 1970s. Unlike the simpler, four-piece-band sound of funk, soul music of the late 1960s or the small jazz organ trios, disco music often included a large band, with several chordal instruments (guitar, keyboards, synthesizer), several drum or percussion instruments (drum kit, Latin percussion, electronic drums), a horn section, a string orchestra, and a variety of "classical" solo instruments (for example, flute, piccolo, and so on).

Disco songs were arranged and composed by experienced arrangers and orchestrators, and record producers added their creative touches to the overall sound using multitrack recording techniques and effects units. Recording complex arrangements with such a large number of instruments and sections required a team that included a conductor, copyists, record producers, and mixing engineers. Mixing engineers had an important role in the disco production process because disco songs used as many as 64 tracks of vocals and instruments. Mixing engineers and record producers, under the direction of arrangers, compiled these tracks into a fluid composition of verses, bridges, and refrains, complete with builds and breaks. Mixing engineers and record producers helped to develop the "disco sound" by creating a distinctive-sounding, sophisticated disco mix.

Early records were the "standard" three-minute version until Tom Moulton came up with a way to make songs longer so that he could take a crowd of dancers at a club to another level and keep them dancing longer. He found that it was impossible to make the 45 rpm vinyl singles of the time longer, as they could usually hold no more than five minutes of good-quality music. With the help of José Rodriguez, his remaster/mastering engineer, he pressed a single on a 10-inch disc instead of 7-inch. They cut the next single on a 12-inch disc, the same format as a standard album. Moulton and Rodriguez discovered that these larger records could have much longer songs and remixes. 12-inch single records, also known as "maxi singles", quickly became the standard format for all DJs of the disco genre.

== Club culture ==
=== Nightclubs ===
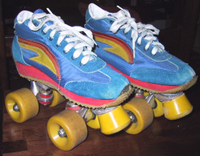
Blue disco quad roller skates

By the late 1970s, most major US cities had thriving disco club scenes. The largest scenes were most notably in New York City but also in Philadelphia, Baltimore, San Francisco, Miami, and Washington, D.C. The scene was centered on discotheques, nightclubs and private loft parties.

In the 1970s, notable discos included "Crisco Disco", "The Sanctuary", "Leviticus", "Studio 54", and "Paradise Garage" in New York, "Artemis" in Philadelphia,"Ordell's" in Baltimore,"Studio One" in Los Angeles, "Dugan's Bistro" in Chicago, and "The Library" in Atlanta.

In the late 1970s, Studio 54 in Midtown Manhattan was arguably the best-known nightclub in the world. This club played a major formative role in the growth of disco music and nightclub culture in general. It was operated by Steve Rubell and Ian Schrager and was notorious for the hedonism that went on within: the balconies were known for sexual encounters and drug use was rampant. Its dance floor was decorated with an image of the "Man in the Moon" that included an animated cocaine spoon.

The "Copacabana", another New York nightclub dating to the 1940s, had a revival in the late 1970s when it embraced disco; it would become the setting of a Barry Manilow song of the same name.

In Washington, D.C., large disco clubs such as "The Pier" ("Pier 9") and "The Other Side", originally regarded exclusively as "gay bars", became particularly popular among the capital area's gay and straight college students in the late '70s.

By 1979 there were 15,000-20,000 disco nightclubs in the US, many of them opening in suburban shopping centers, hotels, and restaurants. The 2001 Club franchises were the most prolific chain of disco clubs in the country. Although many other attempts were made to franchise disco clubs, 2001 was the only one to successfully do so in this time frame.

=== Sound and light equipment ===
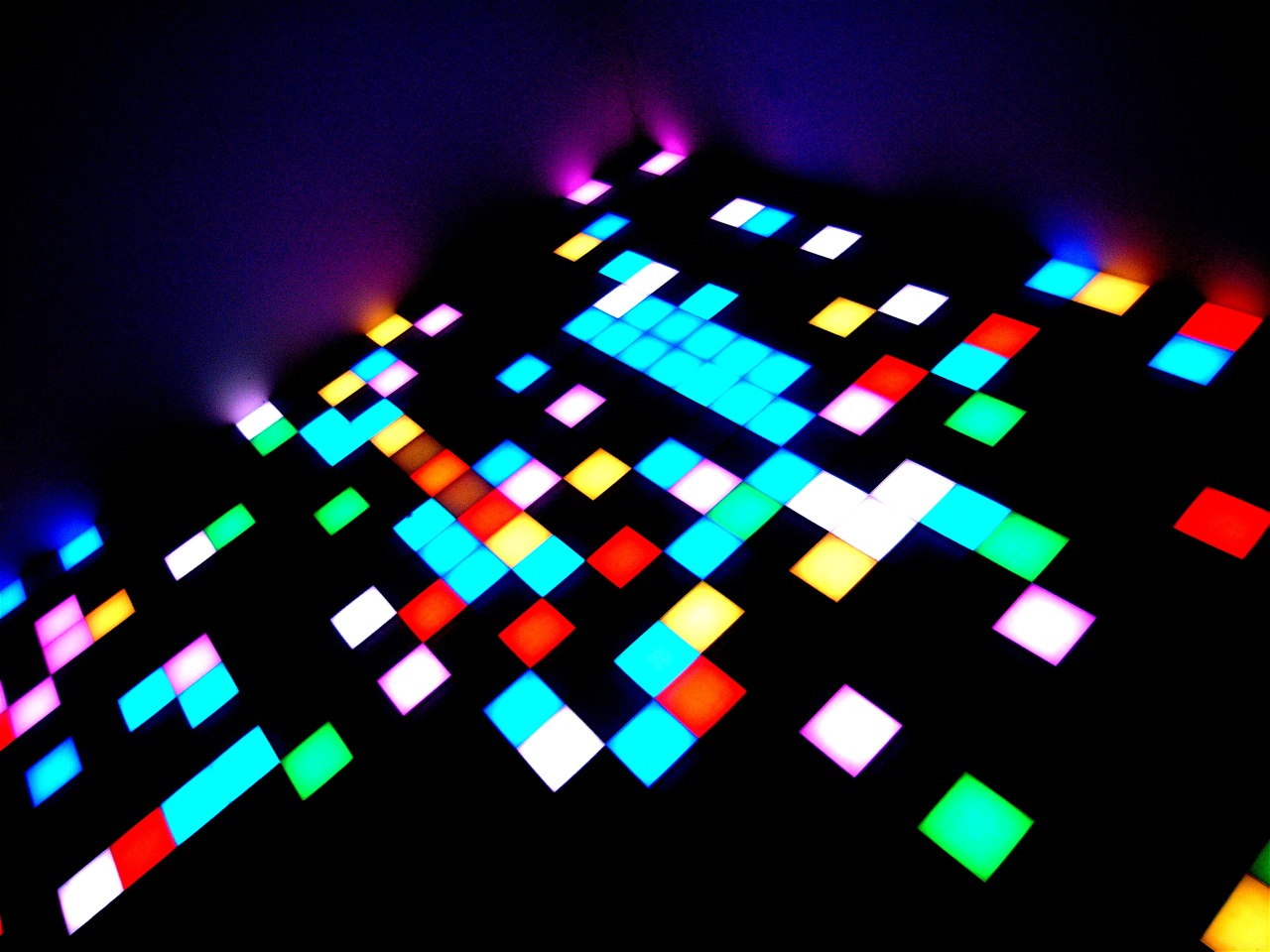
Major disco clubs had lighted dance floors, with the lights flashing to complement the beat.

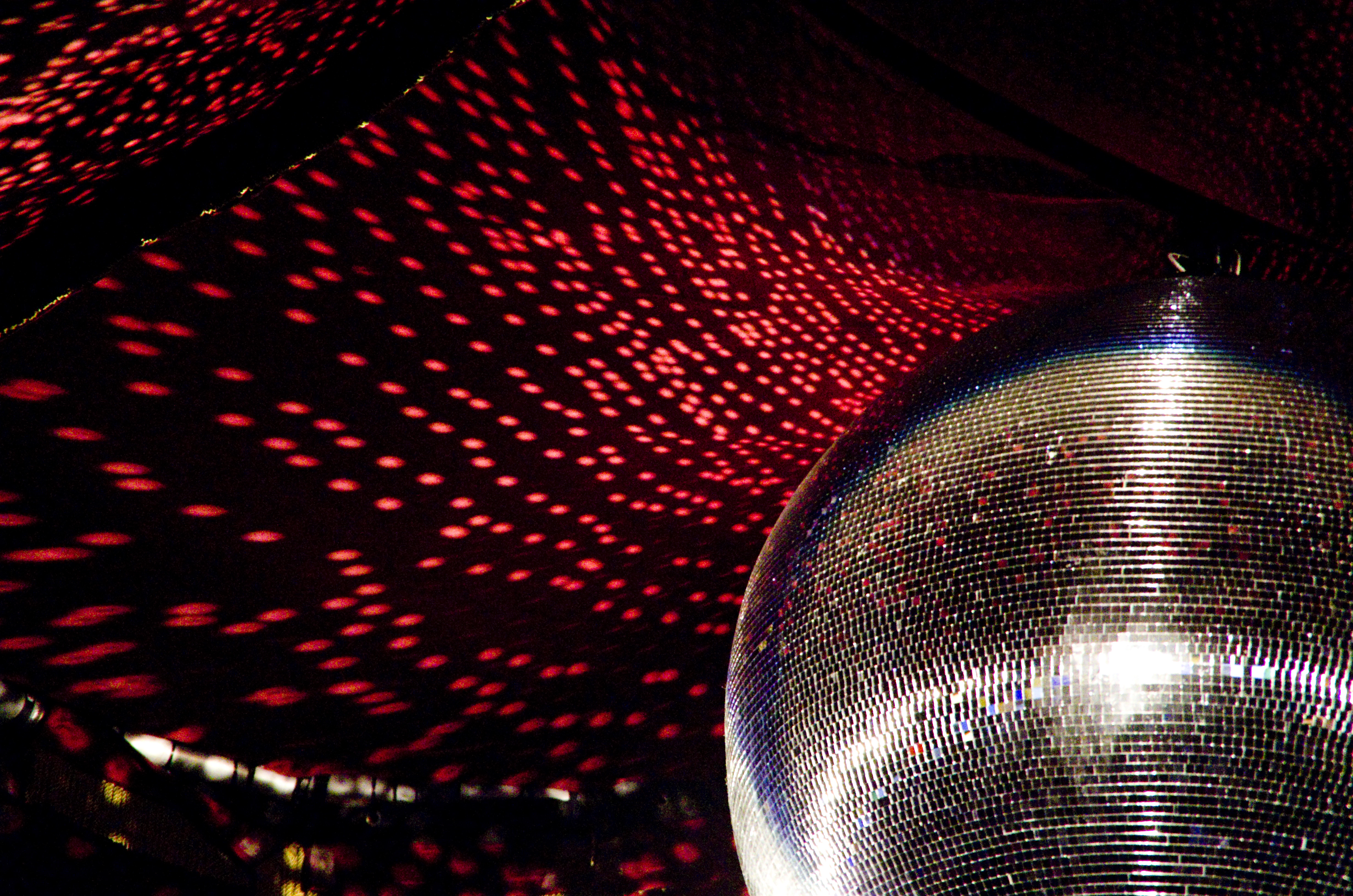
The reflective light disco ball was a fixture on the ceilings of many discothèques.

Powerful, bass-heavy, hi-fi sound systems were viewed as a key part of the disco club experience. The Loft party host David Mancuso introduced the technologies of tweeter arrays (clusters of small loudspeakers, which emit high-end frequencies, positioned above the floor) and bass reinforcements (additional sets of subwoofers positioned at ground level) at the start of the 1970s to boost the treble and bass at opportune moments, and by the end of the decade sound engineers such as Richard Long had multiplied the effects of these innovations in venues such as the Garage."

Typical lighting designs for disco dance floors include multi-colored lights that swirl around or flash to the beat, strobe lights, an illuminated dance floor, and a mirror ball.

=== DJs ===
Disco-era disc jockeys (DJs) would often remix existing songs using reel-to-reel tape machines, and add in percussion breaks, new sections, and new sounds. DJs would select songs and grooves according to what the dancers wanted, transitioning from one song to another with a DJ mixer and using a microphone to introduce songs and speak to the audiences. Other equipment was added to the basic DJ setup, providing unique sound manipulations, such as reverb, equalization, and echo effects unit. Using this equipment, a DJ could do effects such as cutting out all but the bassline of a song and then slowly mixing in the beginning of another song using the DJ mixer's crossfader. Notable U.S. disco DJs include Francis Grasso of The Sanctuary, David Mancuso of The Loft, Frankie Knuckles of the Chicago Warehouse, Larry Levan of the Paradise Garage, Nicky Siano of The Gallery, Walter Gibbons, Karen Mixon Cook, Jim Burgess, John "Jellybean" Benitez, Richie Kulala of Studio 54, and Rick Salsalini.

Some DJs were also record producers who created and produced disco songs in the recording studio. Larry Levan, for example, was a prolific record producer as well as a DJ. Because record sales were often dependent on dance floor play by DJs in the nightclubs, DJs were also influential in the development and popularization of certain types of disco music being produced for record labels.

=== Dance ===
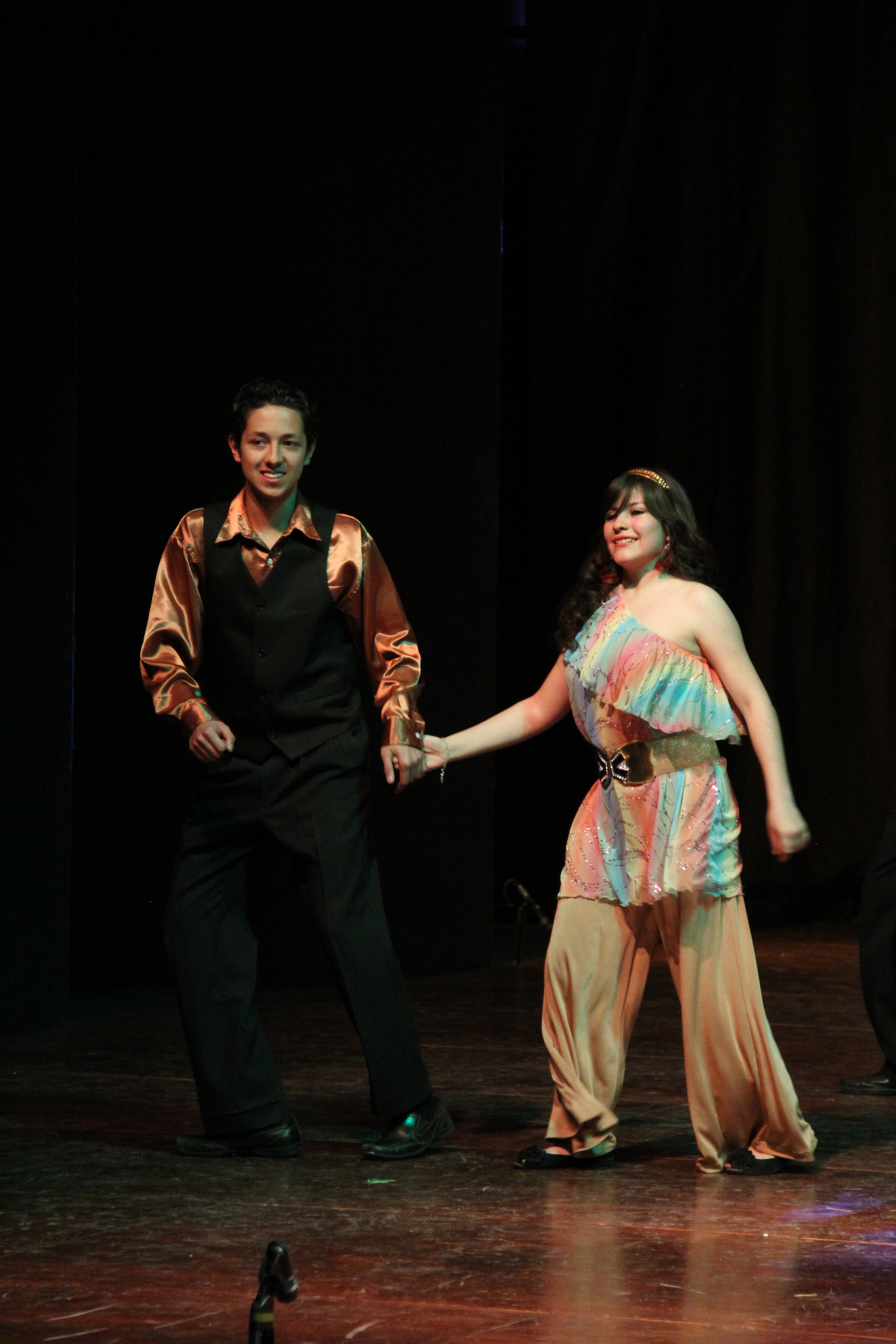
Disco dancers typically wore loose slacks for men and flowing dresses for women, which enabled ease of movement on the dance floor.

In the early years, dancers in discos danced in a "hang loose" or "freestyle" approach. At first, many dancers improvised their own dance styles and dance steps. Later in the disco era, popular dance styles were developed, including the "Bump", "Penguin", "Boogaloo", "Watergate", and "Robot". By October 1975 the Hustle reigned. It was highly stylized, sophisticated, and overtly sexual. Variations included the Brooklyn Hustle, New York Hustle, and Latin Hustle.

During the disco era, many nightclubs would commonly host disco dance competitions or offer free dance lessons. Some cities had disco dance instructors or dance schools, which taught people how to do popular disco dances such as "touch dancing", "the hustle", and "the cha cha". The pioneer of disco dance instruction was Karen Lustgarten in San Francisco in 1973. Her book The Complete Guide to Disco Dancing (Warner Books 1978) was the first to name, break down and codify popular disco dances as dance forms and distinguish between disco freestyle, partner, and line dances. The book hit the New York Times bestseller list for 13 weeks and was translated into Chinese, German, and French.

In Chicago, the Step By Step disco dance TV show was launched with the sponsorship support of the Coca-Cola company. Produced in the same studio that Don Cornelius used for the nationally syndicated dance/music television show, Soul Train, Step by Step's audience grew and the show became a success. The dynamic dance duo of Robin and Reggie led the show. The pair spent the week teaching disco dancing to dancers in the disco clubs. The instructional show aired on Saturday mornings and had a strong following. Its viewers would stay up all night on Fridays so they could be on the set the next morning, ready to return to the disco on Saturday night knowing with the latest personalized steps. The producers of the show, John Reid and Greg Roselli, routinely made appearances at disco functions with Robin and Reggie to scout out new dancing talent and promote upcoming events such as "Disco Night at White Sox Park".

In Sacramento, California, Disco King Paul Dale Roberts danced for the Guinness Book of World Records. He danced for 205 hours, the equivalent of 8½ days. Other dance marathons took place afterward and Roberts held the world record for disco dancing for a short period of time.

Some notable professional dance troupes of the 1970s included Pan's People and Hot Gossip. For many dancers, a key source of inspiration for 1970s disco dancing was the film Saturday Night Fever (1977). Further influence came from the music and dance style of such films as Fame (1980), Disco Dancer (1982), Flashdance (1983), and The Last Days of Disco (1998). Interest in disco dancing also helped spawn dance competition TV shows such as Dance Fever (1979).

=== Fashion ===
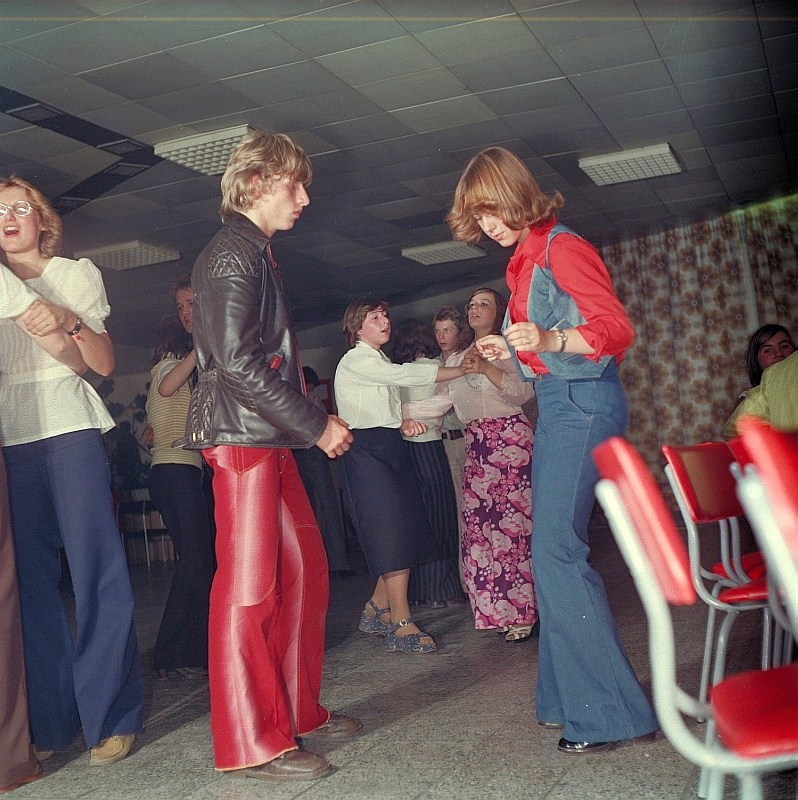
Dancers at an East German discothèque in 1977. Due to the constant scarcity of consumer goods in the then socialist part of Germany, particularly more exotic fashion items like disco wear, people often sewed them themselves.

Disco fashions were very trendy in the late 1970s. Discothèque-goers often wore glamorous, expensive, and extravagant fashions for nights out at their local disco club. Some women would wear sheer, flowing dresses, such as Halston dresses, or loose, flared pants. Other women wore tight, revealing, sexy clothes, such as backless halter tops, disco pants, "hot pants", or body-hugging spandex bodywear or "catsuits". Men would wear shiny polyester Qiana shirts with colorful patterns and pointy, extra wide collars, preferably open at the chest. Men often wore Pierre Cardin suits, three piece suits with a vest, and double-knit polyester shirt jackets with matching trousers known as the leisure suit. Men's leisure suits were typically form-fitted to some parts of the body, such as the waist and bottom while the lower part of the pants were flared in a bell bottom style, to permit freedom of movement.

During the disco era, men engaged in elaborate grooming rituals and spent time choosing fashion clothing, activities that would have been considered "feminine" according to the gender stereotypes of the era. Women dancers wore glitter makeup, sequins, or gold lamé clothing that would shimmer under the lights. Bold colors were popular for both genders. Platform shoes and boots for both genders and high heels for women were popular footwear. Necklaces and medallions were a common fashion accessory. Less commonly, some disco dancers wore outlandish costumes, dressed in drag, covered their bodies with gold or silver paint, or wore very skimpy outfits leaving them nearly nude; these uncommon get-ups were more likely to be seen at invitation-only New York City loft parties and disco clubs.

=== Drug subculture ===
In addition to the dance and fashion aspects of the disco club scene, there was also a thriving club drug subculture, particularly for drugs that would enhance the experience of dancing to the loud, bass-heavy music and the flashing colored lights, such as cocaine (nicknamed "blow"), amyl nitrite ("poppers"), and the "other quintessential 1970s club drug Quaalude, which suspended motor coordination and gave the sensation that one's arms and legs had turned to 'Jell-O.'" Quaaludes were so popular at disco clubs that the drug was nicknamed "disco biscuits".

Paul Gootenberg states that "[t]he relationship of cocaine to 1970s disco culture cannot be stressed enough". During the 1970s, the use of cocaine by well-to-do celebrities led to its "glamorization" and to the widely held view that it was a "soft drug". LSD, marijuana, and "speed" (amphetamines) were also popular in disco clubs, and the use of these drugs "contributed to the hedonistic quality of the dance floor experience." Since disco dances were typically held in liquor licensed-nightclubs and dance clubs, alcoholic drinks were also consumed by dancers; some users intentionally combined alcohol with the consumption of other drugs, such as Quaaludes, for a stronger effect.

=== Eroticism and sexual liberation ===
According to Peter Braunstein, the "massive quantities of drugs ingested in discothèques produced the next cultural phenomenon of the disco era: rampant promiscuity and public sex. While the dance floor was the central arena of seduction, actual sex usually took place in the nether regions of the disco: bathroom stalls, exit stairwells, and so on. In other cases the disco became a kind of 'main course' in a hedonist's menu for a night out." At The Saint nightclub, a high percentage of the gay male dancers and patrons would have sex in the club; they typically had unprotected sex, because in 1980, HIV-AIDS had not yet been identified. At The Saint, "dancers would elope to an unpoliced upstairs balcony to engage in sex." The promiscuity and public sex at discos was part of a broader trend towards exploring a freer sexual expression in the 1970s, an era that is also associated with "swingers clubs, hot tubs, [and] key parties."

In his paper, "In Defense of Disco" (1979), Richard Dyer claims eroticism as one of the three main characteristics of disco. As opposed to rock music which has a very phallic centered eroticism focusing on the sexual pleasure of men over other persons, Dyer describes disco as featuring a non-phallic full body eroticism. Through a range of percussion instruments, a willingness to play with rhythm, and the endless repeating of phrases without cutting the listener off, disco achieved this full-body eroticism by restoring eroticism to the whole body for both sexes. This allowed for the potential expression of sexualities not defined by the cock/penis, and the erotic pleasure of bodies that are not defined by a relationship to a penis. The sexual liberation expressed through the rhythm of disco is further represented in the club spaces that disco grew within.

In Peter Shapiro's Modulations: A History of Electronic Music: Throbbing Words on Sound, he discusses eroticism through the technology disco utilizes to create its audacious sound. The music, Shapiro states, is adjunct to "the pleasure-is-politics ethos of post-Stonewall culture." He explains how "mechano-eroticism", which links the technology used to create the unique mechanical sound of disco to eroticism, set the genre in a new dimension of reality living outside of naturalism and heterosexuality. Randy Jones and Mark Jacobsen echo this sentiment in BBC Radio's "The Politics of Dancing: How Disco Changed the World," describing the loose, hip-focused dance style as "a new kind of communion" that celebrates the sparks of liberation brought on the Stonewall riots. As New York state had laws against homosexual behavior in public, including dancing with a member of the same sex, the eroticism of disco served as resistance and an expression of sexual freedom.

He uses Donna Summer's singles "Love to Love You Baby" (1975) and "I Feel Love" (1977) as examples of the ever-present relationship between the synthesized bass lines and backgrounds to the simulated sounds of orgasms. Summer's voice echoes in the tracks, and likens them to the drug-fervent, sexually liberated fans of disco who sought to free themselves through disco's "aesthetic of machine sex." Shapiro sees this as an influence that creates sub-genres like hi-NRG and dub-disco, which allowed for eroticism and technology to be further explored through intense synth bass lines and alternative rhythmic techniques that tap into the entire body rather than the obvious erotic parts of the body.

The New York nightclub The Sanctuary under resident DJ Francis Grasso is a prime example of this sexual liberty. In their history of the disc jockey and club culture, Bill Brewster and Frank Broughton describe the Sanctuary as "poured full of newly liberated gay men, then shaken (and stirred) by a weighty concoction of dance music and pharmacoia of pills and potions, the result is a festivaly of carnality." The Sanctuary was the "first totally uninhibited gay discotheque in America" and while sex was not allowed on the dancefloor, the dark corners, bathrooms. and hallways of the adjacent buildings were all utilized for orgy-like sexual engagements.

By describing the music, drugs, and liberated mentality as a trifecta coming together to create the festival of carnality, Brewster and Broughton are inciting all three as stimuli for the dancing, sex, and other embodied movements that contributed to the corporeal vibrations within the Sanctuary. It supports the argument that disco music took a role in facilitating this sexual liberation that was experienced in the discotheques. The recent legalization of abortion and the introduction of antibiotics and the pill facilitated a culture shift around sex from one of procreation to pleasure and enjoyment. Thus was fostered a very sex-positive framework around discotheques.

Further, in addition to gay sex being illegal in New York state, until 1973 the American Psychiatric Association classified homosexuality as an illness. This law and classification coupled together can be understood to have heavily dissuaded the expression of queerness in public, as such the liberatory dynamics of discotheques can be seen as having provided space for self-realization for queer persons. David Mancuso's club/house party, The Loft, was described as having a "pansexual attitude [that] was revolutionary in a country where up until recently it had been illegal for two men to dance together unless there was a woman present; where women were legally obliged to wear at least one recognizable item of female clothing in public; and where men visiting gay bars usually carried bail money with them."

== Legacy ==
=== DJ culture ===
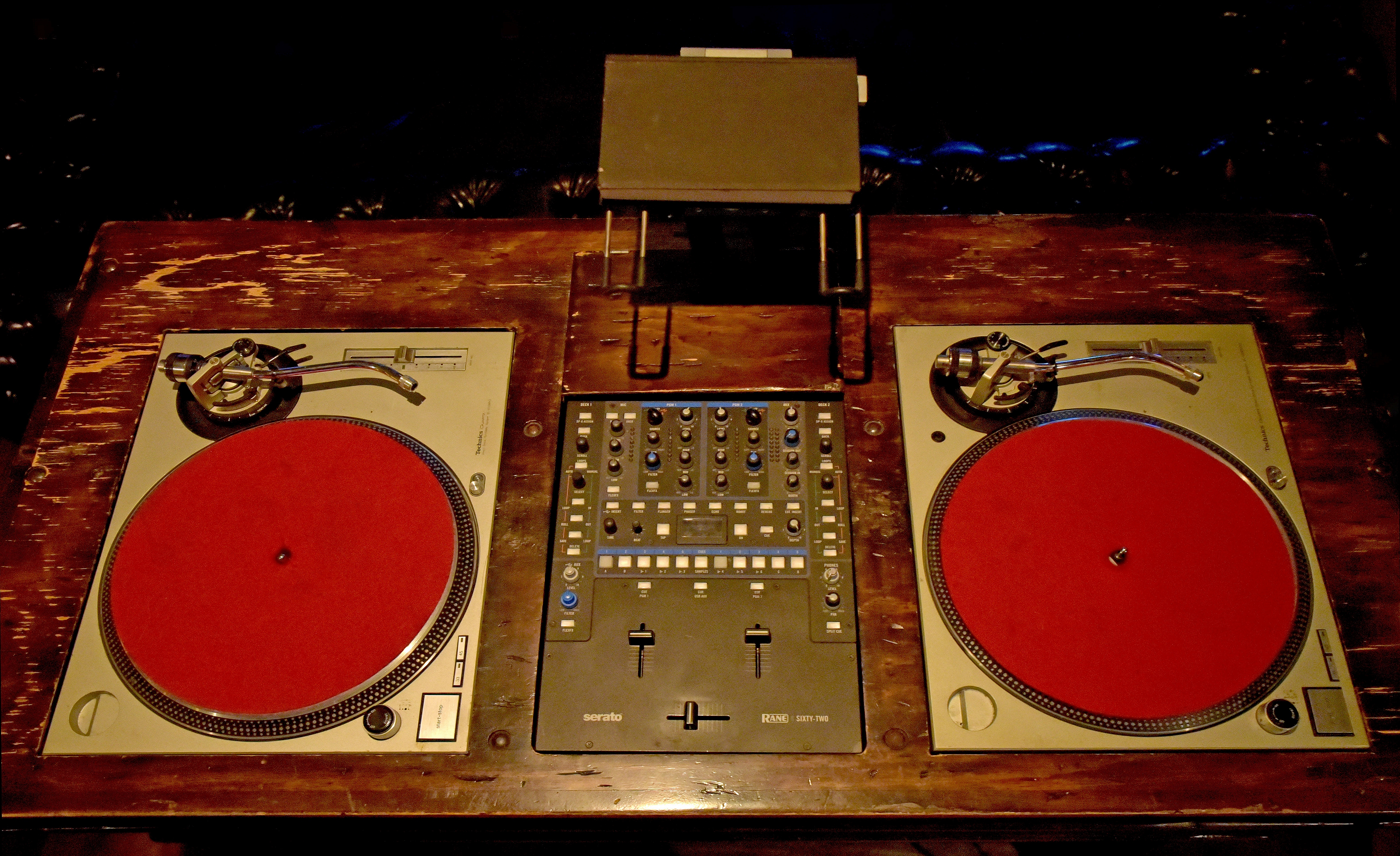
Classic DJ Station. A DJ mixer is placed between two Technics SL-1200 MK 2 turntables.

The rising popularity of disco came in tandem with developments in the role of the DJ. DJing developed from the use of multiple record turntables and DJ mixers to create a continuous, seamless mix of songs, with one song transitioning to another with no break in the music to interrupt the dancing. The resulting DJ mix differed from previous forms of dance music in the 1960s, which were oriented towards live performances by musicians. It, in turn, affected the arrangement of dance music, since songs in the disco era typically contained beginnings and endings marked by a simple beat or riff that could be easily used to transition to a new song. The development of DJing was also influenced by new turntablism techniques, such as beatmatching and scratching, a process facilitated by the introduction of new turntable technologies such as the Technics SL-1200 MK 2, first sold in 1978, which had a precise variable pitch control and a direct drive motor. DJs were often avid record collectors, who would hunt through used record stores for obscure soul records and vintage funk recordings. DJs helped to introduce rare records and new artists to club audiences.

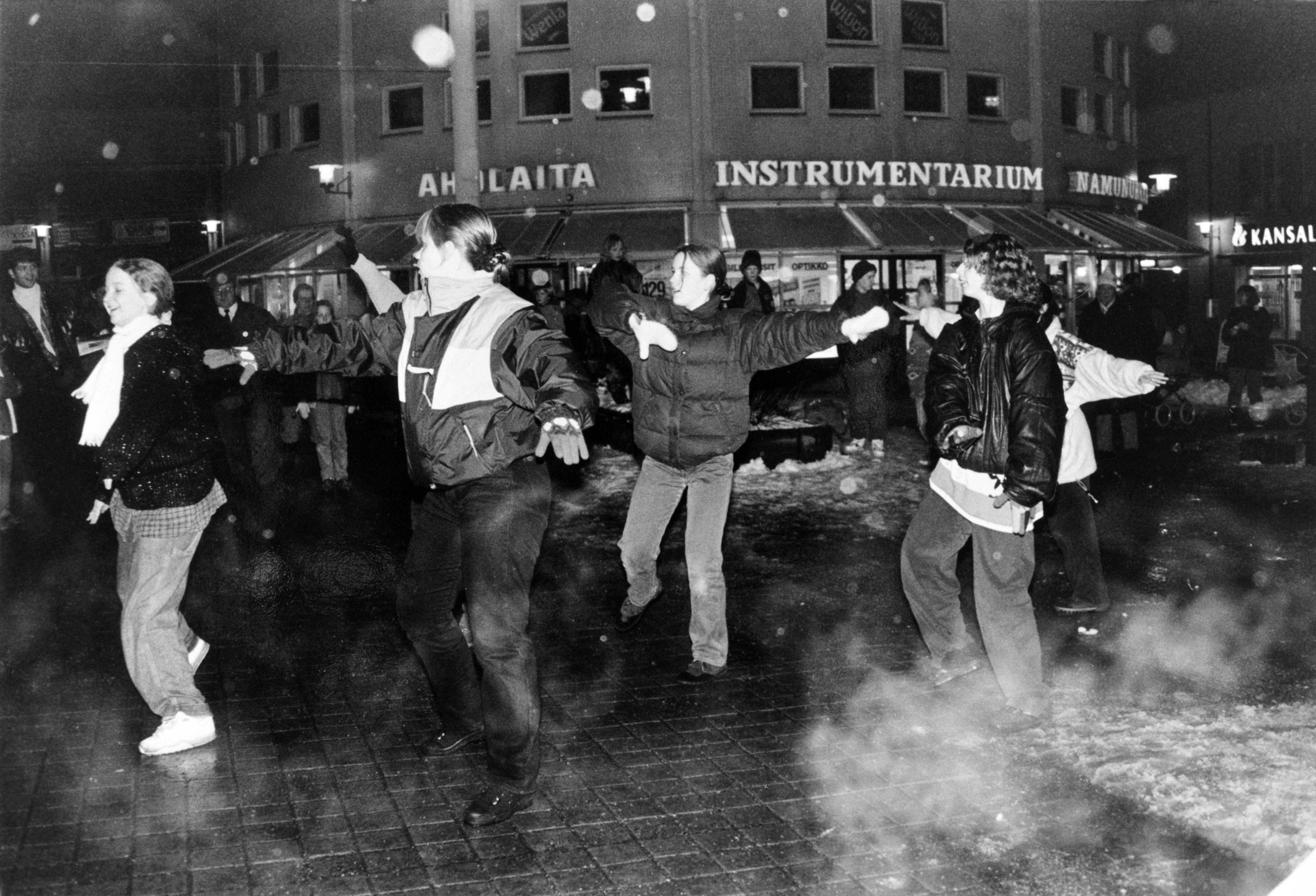
Disco dance performance at the 30th anniversary of Kontula in Helsinki, Finland, in 1994

In the 1970s, individual DJs became more prominent, and some DJs, such as Larry Levan, the resident at Paradise Garage, Jim Burgess, Tee Scott, and Francis Grasso became famous in the disco scene. Levan, for example, developed a cult following among clubgoers, who referred to his DJ sets as "Saturday Mass". Some DJs would use reel-to-reel tape recorders to make remixes and tape edits of songs. Some DJs who were making remixes made the transition from the DJ booth to becoming a record producer, notably Burgess. Scott developed several innovations. He was the first disco DJ to use three turntables as sound sources, the first to simultaneously play two beat-matched records, the first to use electronic effects units in his mixes, and he was an innovator in mixing dialogue in from well-known movies, typically over a percussion break. These mixing techniques were also applied to radio DJs, such as Ted Currier of WKTU and WBLS. Grasso is particularly notable for taking the DJ "profession out of servitude and [making] the DJ the musical head chef." Once he entered the scene, the DJ was no longer responsible for waiting on the crowd hand and foot, meeting their every song request. Instead, with increased agency and visibility, the DJ was now able to use their own technical and creative skills to whip up a nightly special of innovative mixes, refining their personal sound and aesthetic, and building their own reputation.

=== Post-disco ===
The post-disco sound and genres associated with it originated in the 1970s and early 1980s with R&B and post-punk musicians focusing on a more electronic and experimental side of disco, spawning boogie, Italo disco, and alternative dance. Drawing from a diverse range of non-disco influences and techniques, such as the "one-man band" style of Kashif and Stevie Wonder and alternative approaches of Parliament-Funkadelic, it was driven by synthesizers, keyboards, and drum machines. Post-disco acts include D. Train, Patrice Rushen, ESG, Bill Laswell, Arthur Russell. Post-disco had an important influence on dance-pop and was bridging classical disco and later forms of electronic dance music.

=== House music and rave culture ===
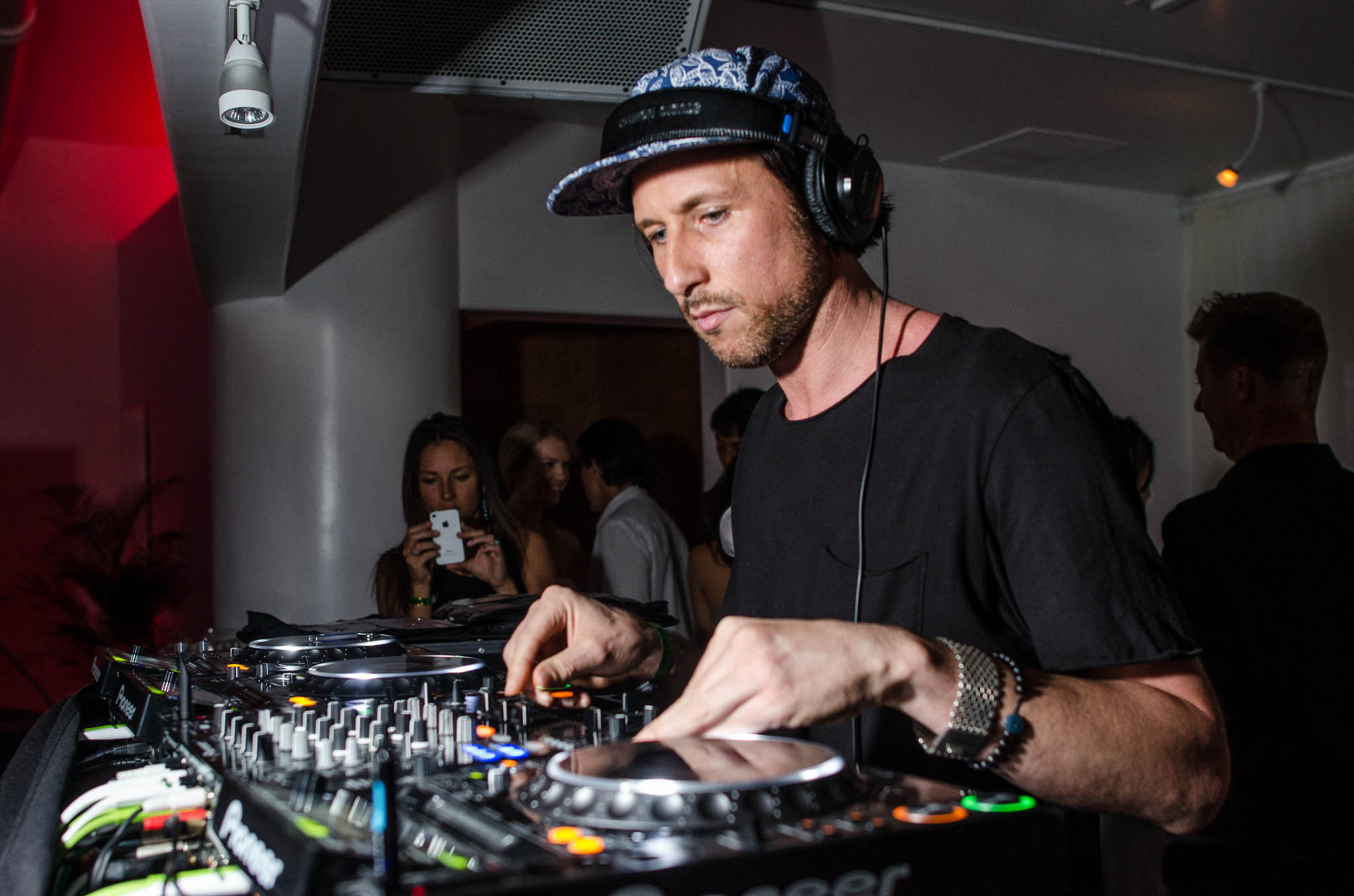
Like disco, house music was based around DJs creating mixes for dancers in clubs. Pictured is DJ Miguel Migs, mixing using CDJ players.

House music is a genre of electronic dance music that originated in Chicago in the early 1980s (also see: Chicago house). It quickly spread to other American cities such as Detroit, where it developed into the harder and more industrial techno, New York City (also see: garage house), and Newark – all of which developed their own regional scenes.

In the mid-to-late 1980s, house music became popular in Europe as well as major cities in South America and Australia. Early house music commercial success in Europe saw songs such as "Pump Up The Volume" by MARRS (1987), "House Nation" by House Master Boyz and the Rude Boy of House (1987), "Theme from S'Express" by S'Express (1988) and "Doctorin' the House" by Coldcut (1988) in the pop charts. Since the early to mid-1990s, house music has been infused in mainstream pop and dance music worldwide.

House music in the 2010s, while keeping several of these core elements, notably the prominent kick drum on every beat, varies widely in style and influence, ranging from the soulful and atmospheric deep house to the more aggressive acid house or the minimalist microhouse. House music has also fused with several other genres creating fusion subgenres, such as euro house, tech house, electro house, and jump house.

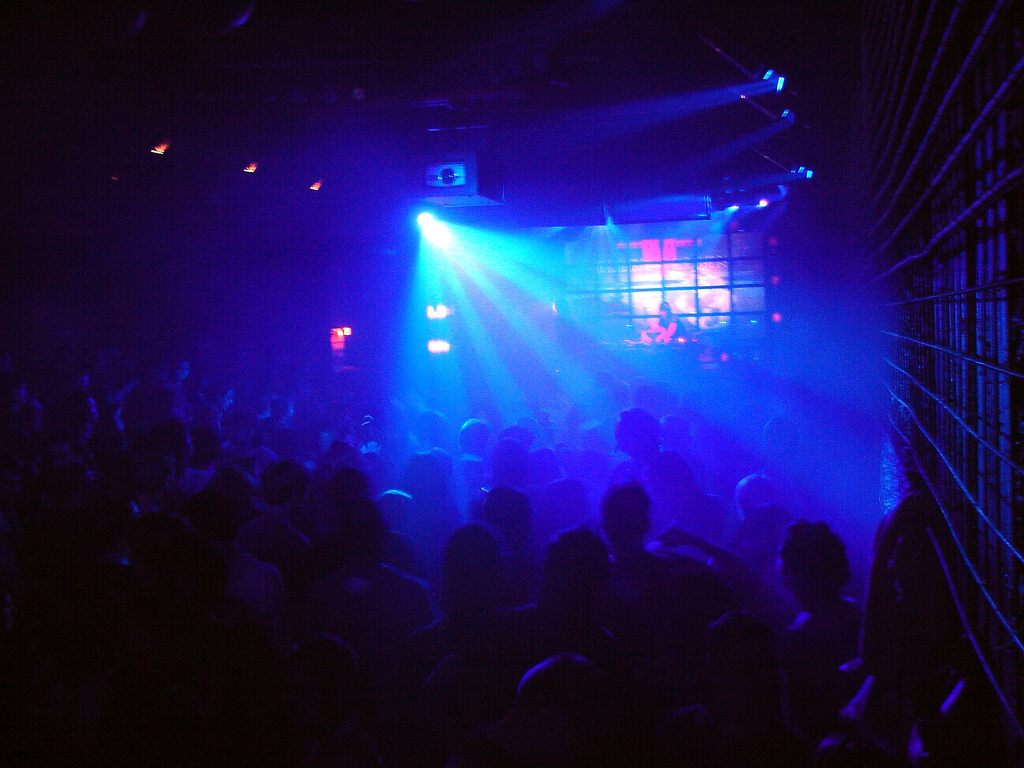
Strobing lights flash at a rave dance event in Vienna, 2005

In the late 1980s and early 1990s, rave culture began to emerge from the house and acid house scene. Like house, it incorporated disco culture's same love of dance music played by DJs over powerful sound systems, recreational drug and club drug exploration, sexual promiscuity, and hedonism. Although disco culture started out underground, it eventually thrived in the mainstream by the late 1970s, and major labels commodified and packaged the music for mass consumption. In contrast, the rave culture started out underground and stayed (mostly) underground. In part, this was to avoid the animosity that was still surrounding disco and dance music. The rave scene also stayed underground to avoid law enforcement attention that was directed at the rave culture due to its use of secret, unauthorized warehouses for some dance events and its association with illegal club drugs like ecstasy.

=== Post-punk ===
The post-punk movement that originated in the late 1970s both supported punk rock's rule-breaking while rejecting its move back to raw rock music. Post-punk's mantra of constantly moving forward lent itself to both openness to and experimentation with elements of disco and other styles. Public Image Limited is considered the first post-punk group. The group's second album Metal Box fully embraced the "studio as instrument" methodology of disco. The group's founder John Lydon, the former lead singer for the Sex Pistols, told the press that disco was the only music he cared for at the time.

No wave was a subgenre of post-punk centered in New York City. For shock value, James Chance, a notable member of the no wave scene, penned an article in the East Village Eye urging his readers to move uptown and get "trancin' with some superradioactive disco voodoo funk". His band James White and the Blacks wrote a disco album titled Off White. Their performances resembled those of disco performers (horn section, dancers and so on). In 1981 ZE Records led the transition from no wave into the more subtle mutant disco (post-disco/punk) genre. Mutant disco acts such as Kid Creole and the Coconuts, Was Not Was, ESG and Liquid Liquid influenced several British post-punk acts such as New Order, Orange Juice and A Certain Ratio.

=== Nu-disco ===
Nu-disco is a 21st-century dance music genre associated with the renewed interest in 1970s and early 1980s disco, mid-1980s Italo disco, and the synthesizer-heavy Euro disco aesthetics. The moniker appeared in print as early as 2002, and by mid-2008 was used by record shops such as the online retailers Juno and Beatport. These vendors often associate it with re-edits of original-era disco music, as well as with music from European producers who make dance music inspired by original-era American disco, electro, and other genres popular in the late 1970s and early 1980s. It is also used to describe the music on several American labels who were previously associated with the genres electroclash and French house.

== Revivals and return to mainstream success ==
=== 1990s resurgence ===
In the 1990s, after a decade of backlash, disco and its legacy became more accepted by pop music artists and listeners alike, as more songs, films, and compilations were released that referenced disco. This was part of a wave of 1970s nostalgia that was taking place in popular culture at the time. Some commentators attributed the revival of the genre to frequent use of disco music in fashion shows.

Examples of songs during this time that were influenced by disco included Deee-Lite's "Groove Is in the Heart" (1990), U2's "Lemon" (1993), Blur's "Girls & Boys" (1994) and "Entertain Me" (1995), Pulp's "Disco 2000" (1995), and Jamiroquai's "Canned Heat" (1999), while films such as Boogie Nights (1997) and The Last Days of Disco (1998) featured primarily disco soundtracks.

=== 2000s resurgence ===
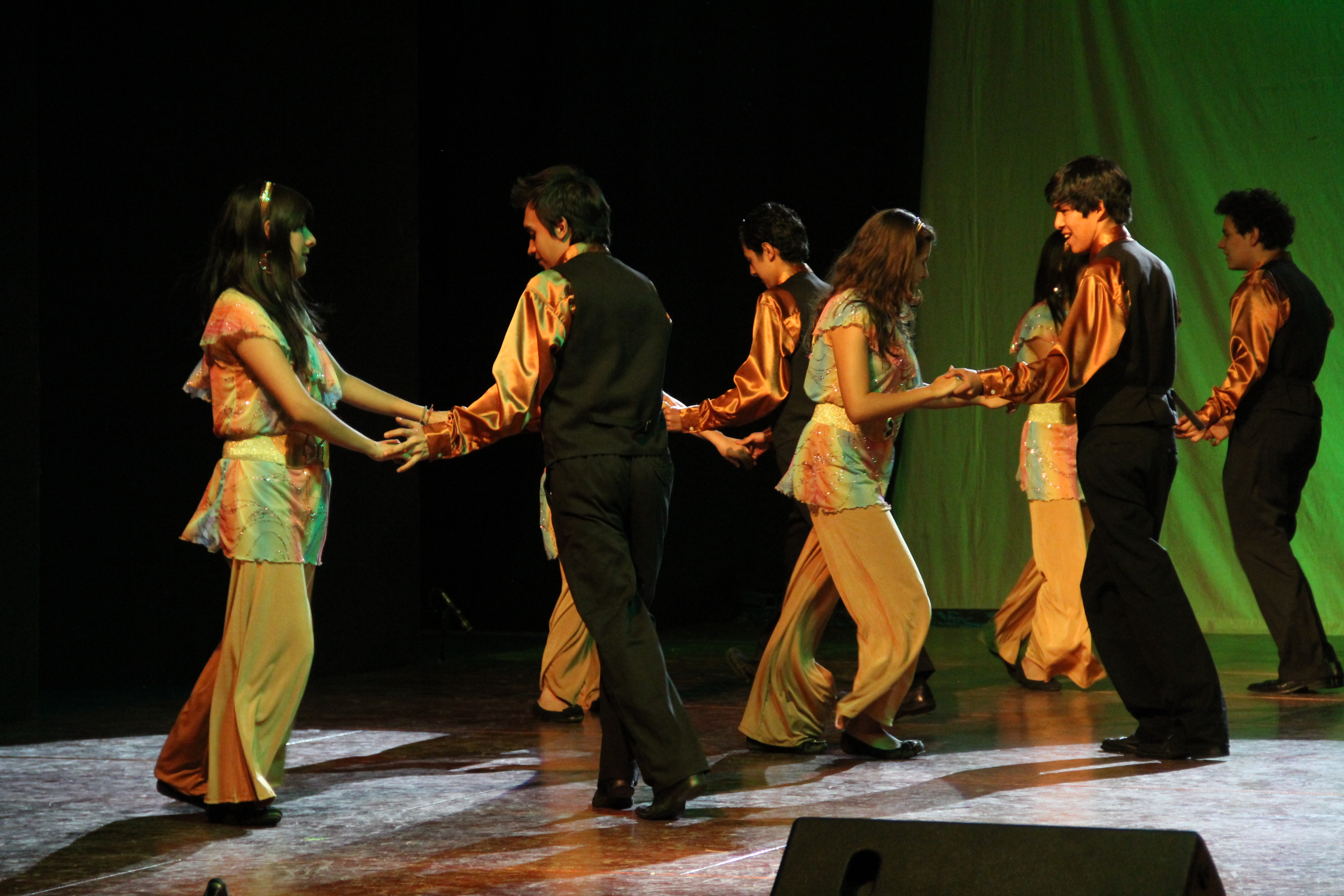
Students from Monterrey Institute of Technology and Higher Education, Mexico City dancing to disco during a cultural event on campus

In the early 2000s, an updated genre of disco called "nu-disco" began breaking into the mainstream. A few examples like Daft Punk's "One More Time" and Kylie Minogue's "Love at First Sight" and "Can't Get You Out of My Head" became club favorites and commercial successes. Several nu-disco songs were crossovers with funky house, such as Spiller's "Groovejet (If This Ain't Love)" and Modjo's "Lady (Hear Me Tonight)", both songs sampling older disco songs and both reaching number one on the UK Singles Chart in 2000. Robbie Williams's disco single "Rock DJ" was the UK's fourth best-selling single the same year. Jamiroquai's song "Little L" and "Murder on the Dancefloor" by Sophie Ellis-Bextor were hits in 2001. Rock band Manic Street Preachers released a disco song, "Miss Europa Disco Dancer", in the same year. The song's disco influence, which appears on Know Your Enemy, was described as being "much-discussed".

In 2005, Madonna immersed herself in the disco music of the 1970s and released her album Confessions on a Dance Floor to rave reviews. One of the singles from the album, "Hung Up", which samples ABBA's 1979 song "Gimme! Gimme! Gimme! (A Man After Midnight)", became a major club staple. In addition to Madonna's disco-influenced attire to award shows and interviews, her Confessions Tour incorporated various elements of the 1970s, such as disco balls, a mirrored stage design, and the roller derby. In 2006, Jessica Simpson released her album A Public Affair inspired by disco and the 1980s music. The first single of the album, "A Public Affair", was reviewed as a disco-dancing competition influenced by Madonna's early works. The video of the song was filmed on a skating rink and features a line dance of hands.

The success of the "nu-disco" revival of the early 2000s was described by music critic Tom Ewing as more interpersonal than the pop music of the 1990s: "The revival of disco within pop put a spotlight on something that had gone missing over the 90s: a sense of music not just for dancing, but for dancing with someone. Disco was a music of mutual attraction: cruising, flirtation, negotiation. Its dancefloor is a space for immediate pleasure, but also for promises kept and otherwise. It's a place where things start, but their resolution, let alone their meaning, is never clear. All of 2000's great disco number ones explore how to play this hand. Madison Avenue look to impose their will upon it, to set terms and roles. Spiller is less rigid. 'Groovejet' accepts the night's changeability, happily sells out certainty for an amused smile and a few great one-liners."

=== 2010s resurgence ===
In 2011, K-pop girl group T-ara released Roly-Poly as a part of their EP John Travolta Wannabe. The song accumulated over 4,000,000 units in digital downloads, which became the highest number of downloads for a K-pop girl group single on the Gaon Digital Chart in the 2010s. In 2013, with several 1970s-style disco and funk being released, the pop charts had more dance songs than at any other point since the late 1970s. The biggest disco song of the year was "Get Lucky" by Daft Punk, featuring Nile Rodgers on guitar. Its parent album, Random Access Memories, ended up winning Album of the Year at the 2014 Grammys. Other disco-styled songs that made it into the top 40 that year were Robin Thicke's "Blurred Lines" (number one), Justin Timberlake's "Take Back the Night" (number 29), Bruno Mars' "Treasure" (number five) Arcade Fire's Reflektor featured strong disco elements. In 2014, disco music could be found in Lady Gaga's Artpop and Katy Perry's "Birthday". Other disco songs from 2014 include "I Want It All" By Karmin, 'Wrong Club" by the Ting Tings, "Blow" by Beyoncé and the William Orbit mix of "Let Me in Your Heart Again" by Queen.

In 2014 Brazilian Globo TV, the second biggest television network in the world, aired Boogie Oogie, a telenovela about the Disco Era that takes place between 1978 and 1979, from the hit fever to the decadence. The show's success was responsible for a Disco revival across the country, bringing back to the stage and to Brazilian record charts local disco divas like Lady Zu and As Frenéticas.

Top-10 entries from 2015 such as Mark Ronson's disco groove-infused "Uptown Funk", Maroon 5's "Sugar", the Weeknd's "Can't Feel My Face" and Jason Derulo's "Want To Want Me" also have a strong disco influence. Disco mogul and producer Giorgio Moroder also re-appeared in 2015 with his new album Déjà Vu, which proved to be a modest success. Other songs from 2015 like "I Don't Like It, I Love It" by Flo Rida, "Adventure of a Lifetime" by Coldplay, "Back Together" by Robin Thicke and "Levels" by Nick Jonas feature disco elements as well. In 2016, disco songs or disco-styled pop songs continued showing a strong presence on the music charts as a possible backlash to the 1980s-styled synthpop, electro house, and dubstep that had been dominating the charts up until then. Justin Timberlake's 2016 song "Can't Stop the Feeling!", which shows strong elements of disco, became the 26th song to debut at number-one on the Billboard Hot 100 in the history of the chart. The Martian, a 2015 film, extensively uses disco music as a soundtrack, although for the main character, astronaut Mark Watney, there's only one thing worse than being stranded on Mars: it's being stranded on Mars with nothing but disco music. "Kill the Lights", featured on an episode of the HBO television series "Vinyl" (2016) and with Nile Rodgers' guitar licks, hit number one on the US Dance chart in July 2016.

=== 2020s resurgence ===
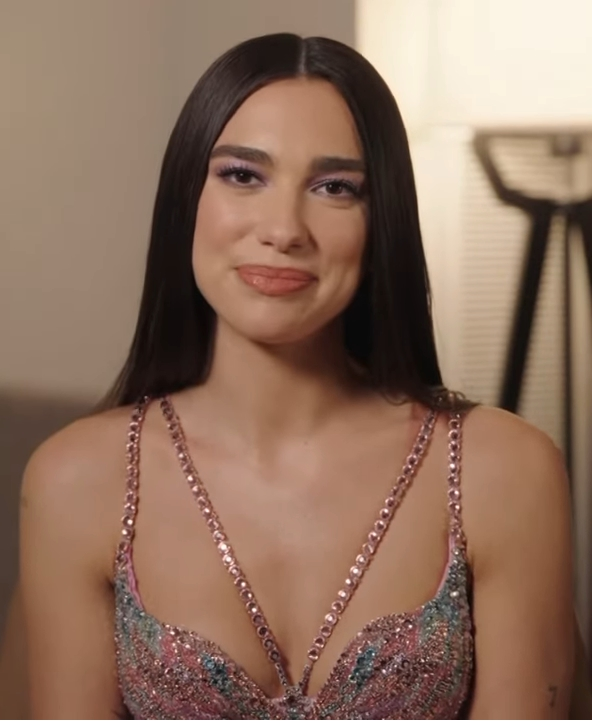
British singer Dua Lipa has been credited by music critics with leading the revival of disco following the widespread international success of her single "Don't Start Now" and her album Future Nostalgia.

In 2020, disco continued its mainstream popularity and became a prominent trend in popular music. In early 2020, disco-influenced hits such as Doja Cat's "Say So", Lady Gaga's "Stupid Love", and Dua Lipa's "Don't Start Now" experienced widespread success on global music charts, charting at numbers 1, 5 and 2, respectively, on the US Billboard Hot 100 chart. At the time, Billboard, declared that Lipa was "leading the charge toward disco-influenced production" a day after her retro and disco-influenced album Future Nostalgia was released on March 27, 2020. By the end of 2020, multiple disco albums had been released, including Adam Lambert's Velvet, Jessie Ware's What's Your Pleasure?, and Róisín Murphy's discothèque mixtape, Róisín Machine. In early September 2020, South Korean group BTS debuted at number 1 in the US with their English–language disco single "Dynamite" having sold 265,000 downloads in its first week in the US, marking the biggest pure sales week since Taylor Swift's "Look What You Made Me Do" (2017).

In July 2020, Australian singer Kylie Minogue announced she would be releasing her fifteenth studio album, Disco, on November 6, 2020. The album was preceded by two singles. The lead single, "Say Something", was released on July 23 and premiered on BBC Radio 2; the second single, "Magic", was released on September 24. Both singles received critical acclaim, with critics praising Minogue for returning to disco roots, which were prominent in her albums Light Years (2000), Fever (2001), and Aphrodite (2010).

== See also ==
- Club Kids
- List of Billboard number-one dance singles of 1977
- List of Billboard number-one dance singles of 1978
- List of Billboard number-one dance singles of 1979
- Roller disco
