= Loremil Machado =

Teacher and performer of Afro-Brazilian dance

- Born: 1953 or 1954; Salvador, Bahia
- Died: March 11, 1994 (aged 40); New York City
- Occupations: Dancer, choreographer, percussionist
- Known for: Mestre Capoeira

Loremil Machado (1953 or 1954 – March 11, 1994) was a teacher and performer of Afro-Brazilian dance. He and fellow dancer, Jelon Vieira, are considered to be responsible for the introduction of capoeira to the United States.

== Early life ==
Loremil Machado was born in 1953 or 1954.

== Career ==
Machado and Vieira, both natives of Bahia, Brazil, came to New York City in 1975, to perform in a production of the play Parto by Brazilian playwright Gilda Grillo and Maria Isabel Barreno. Having decided to stay, they began to teach and perform in venues around the city. Notably, Machado and Vieira performed capoeira demonstrations at public schools in the Bronx. Master capoeira teacher Mestre Acordeon has said "[These] demonstrations by Mestre Jelon [Vieira] and Loremil Machado are considered by many to be responsible for the incorporation of capoeira movements into breakdancing". And author Matthias Röhrig Assunção says "many people believe [their] performances inspired the break dance craze of the 1980s."

The pair also taught at the Clark Center for the Performing Arts and for "four of five years" performed a weekly show of capoeira set to jazz music at the Cachaça nightclub on East 62nd Street. Machado formed his own group, the Loremil Machado Afro-Brazilian Dance Company, and was a featured dancer in Vieira's Capoeiras of Bahia, later renamed DanceBrazil.

Award-winning playwright and poet Ntozake Shange was one of his students, recalling "Where else to be on New Year's Eve? In a lover's arms, you say. Or, maybe at a fabulous champagne New Year's Eve party. No, the place for me was Loremil Machado's class for the end of the year. It was as important as a midnight mass. The class was full to the corners and we were all ready for our athletic, jumping, twirling, kicking, giving much quick knees and feet..."

Pioneering Black filmmaker Warrington Hudlin produced and directed a 1980 documentary short, Capoeira of Brazil, featuring Vieira, Machado, Eusebio da Silva, and their students.

== Death ==
Machado died on March 11, 1994. The New York Times obituary said of him: "Mr. Machado was known for the intensity of his dancing even in styles like the Brazilian martial arts form Capoeira, which calls as much for reckless daring as for skill and training." His longtime friend, writer and dancer Barbara Browning, said that the cause of death was AIDS.
