= Renato D'Agostin =

Italian photographer (born 1983)

Renato D'Agostin (born in 1983) is an Italian photographer, best known for his black and white silver gelatin prints and his books.

D'Agostin used to live and work in New York City and is now based near Venice, Italy. He is represented by Galerie Thierry Bigaignon (Paris, France).

== Work ==
Renato D'Agostin's work can be described as being graphic, contrasty and minimalist. His compositions are all about the relationship between the spaces he evolves in during his various trips abroad and the people he encounters within, bringing to his images a specific atmosphere. His work has been exhibited in many different countries among which USA, Italy, Spain, France and Japan. D'Agostin was the assistant to American photographer Ralph Gibson and he is known for making his own prints in the darkroom.

It has received extensive coverage in the international press

Renato D'Agostin's work marks a shift with his series entitled "Harmony of Chaos" in which he departs from a classical approach to a more conceptual/abstract photography.

His work includes the following series:

- Harmony of Chaos (2019)
- Dirt, in collaboration with Vittoria Gerardi (2018)
- 7439 (2016)
- Los Angeles Archaeologies (2015)
- Kapadokya (2015)
- Etna (2013)
- The Beautiful Cliche (2011)
- Tokyo Untitled (2009)
- Metropolis (2008)

== Publications ==
- Harmony of Chaos, the(M) editions, 2019
- Dirt, Hyakutake Editions, 2018
- Orbit, IIKKI Books, 2018
- Valsanzibio, Nomadic Editions, 2017
- Proxemics, The (M) Editions, 2016
- 7439, Nomadic Editions, 2016
- Archaeologies: Los Angeles, Furlined, 2015
- Kapadokya, Nomadic Editions, 2015
- Frecce, Automatic Books, 2014
- Acrobats, Nomadic Editions, 2014
- Etna, Nomadic Editions, 2013
- The Beautiful Cliché – Venezia, Silvana Editoriale, 2012
- Tokyo Untitled, MC2 Gallery Edizioni, 2009
- 0.00 Night Moleskine, Zeropuntozerozero + Moleskine, 2008
- Un giorno con Lucia, Zeropuntozerozero, 2007
- Metropolis, Zeropuntozerozero, 2007
