= Mary Jane Marcasiano =

American fashion designer

- Born: East Hanover, New Jersey
- Occupations: Fashion designer, Costume designer, film producer, and social entrepreneur.
- Years active: 1980–present
- Spouse: Ralph Gibson
- Website: www.maryjanemarcasiano.com

Mary Jane Marcasiano is an American fashion and costume designer, film producer, and social entrepreneur.

== Early life and education ==
Marcasiano was born in East Hanover Township, New Jersey and later attended Hanover Park High School, but left a year early to attend Montclair State University. After two years at the university, she left Montclair to attend Parsons The New School for Design. While still in art school, Marcasiano studied weaving, and she started selling handwoven handbags, scarves, and accessories in New York.

In 2019, Marcasiano obtained her master's degree from New York University Gallatin with a thesis concerned with the intersection of art, nonprofits, and social change.

== Career ==
While attending Parsons, Marcasiano moved to the Soho area of Manhattan, a neighborhood that played an important role in her creative development and business approach. Recognized as one of the young downtown emerging designers, she showed her first collection in 1979 at the Susan Caldwell Gallery in SoHo. In the early ‘80s Marcasiano became a member of the Council of Fashion Designers of America and was the awarded the Cartier, DuPont, Cutty Sark and Wool Knit Awards.

== Creative aesthetic ==
Marcasiano's design philosophy comes from a desire for comfort in her knitwear by using simple shapes. She would like her designs to be worn from morning to evening, in warm to cold weather, from sexy to serious. This comfort is achieved by combining Lycra-blend stretch fabrics into more traditional knitwear. The color was chosen and matched for the type of yarn to enhance the impact of the color.

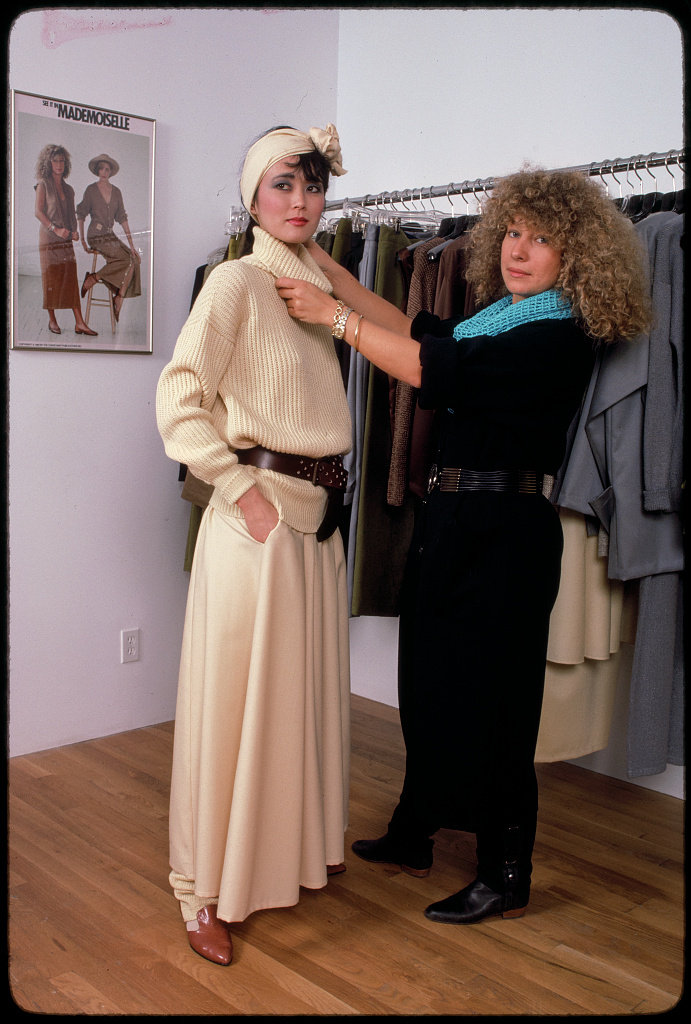
Marcasiano (right) in 1984.

== Company ==
Marcasiano formed her eponymous company in 1979 with her first womenswear collection and introduced a menswear line in 1980. In 1985 she licensed her name to shoes, furs, and jewelry produced in Italy.

Marcasiano's business was purchased by Hampshire Designs in 1995 and was later acquired by Marisa Christina in 1998.

Marcasiano's designs have been sold in boutique, specialty and department stores around the globe and featured in Vogue, Harpers Bazaar and other fashion magazines.

== Involvement in the arts ==
Marcasiano has designed costumes for DanceBrazil, the New York City Ballet, RythMEK at Jacob’s Pillow, Cleo Parker Robinson Dance, Michael Thomas Lab, and for the short film Até Quando. In 2009 Marcasiano collaborated with artist Eric Fischl on costumes for his suite of sculptures titled “ Ten Breaths “ which was exhibited in Germany, Paris and New York. Marcasiano designed the costumes for the 2010/2025 world tours of Grammy award-winning singer Angelique Kidjo and was costume designer for the PBS Special "Angelique Kidjo and Friends: Spirit Rising" and for “Sarabande Africane” Kidjo’s collaboration with Yo-Yo Ma. She was also the costume designer for the 2022 musical theater Yemandja starring Angélique Kidjo. In 2013 Marcasiano designed costumes for the feature film Reaching for the Moon directed by Bruno Barreto. In 2021, Marcasiano was the costume designer for Barreto in the 2021 HBO mini-series The American Guest, starring Aidan Quinn and Dana Delany.

In 2002, Marcasiano produced Ginga, a documentary film about Capoeira directed by Gustavo Moraes. And the documentary LARSENWORLD: LongHouse in East Hampton. She is director of development and special events advisor to Cinema Tropical, a non-profit foundation that distributes and promotes Latin American cinema in the United States. She was the programmer for Cinema Tropical’s Music+Film series at 92YTribeca and directed their Brazilian film initiative Janeiro in New York. And in collaboration with Film at Lincoln Center she co-programmed in 2019 Veredas: A Generation of Brazilian Filmmakers and 2024’s “ Isso é Brasil: Cinema According to L.C. Barreto Productions.

In 2021, Marcasiano was the costume designer for Bruno Barreto in the 2021 HBO mini-series The American Guest, starring Aidan Quinn and Dana Delany. She was also the costume designer for the 2022 musical theater Yemandja starring Angélique Kidjo.

== Community Involvement ==
Marcasiano and her husband Ralph Gibson relocated in 2020 from Soho to Sag Harbor, New York and Marcasiano is active in the Hampton’s arts and education scene. She is a Trustee, Curator and Head of Costumes Collections at the Sag Harbor Historical Museum and has co-curated the exhibitions “Sag Harbor Summers 1882-1907 “In 2024, and 2025's “Wedding Dresses 1840 to 1925 - From Victorian Fashion to the Roaring 20s."

Marcasiano also works in collaboration with the arts organizations The Church, Reutershan Trust and the Sag Harbor School System leading an annual fashion workshop for high school students. She has also collaborated with Women's Art Center of the Hamptons, Guild Hall and The Church participating in and organizing talks.

== Social entrepreneurship ==
In 2007 Marcasiano created the Made With Love Project, a non-profit global initiative dedicated to raising funds and awareness for NGOs aiding women and children in need. The project is supported through the production and sale of products that provide a fair income for women in Brazil, Africa and Haiti. Made With Love does their works through the Cygnet Foundation, a 501(c)(3) non-for-profit public foundation.

Marcasiano also works with women's co-operatives in developing countries, particularly in Africa and South America, facilitating the sale and distribution of the products to a global market through web sales and strategic marketing alliances. The Made With Love Project directs the net proceeds from selling those products to relevant children's charities in the region of the product’s origination.

== Exhibitions and permanent collections ==
- All American: A Sportswear Tradition, Fashion Institute of Technology, 1985.

== Filmography ==
- Reaching for the Moon (2013) – Associate Producer
- Ginga – A Capoeira Documentary (2004) – Producer
- Angelique Kidjo & Friends: Spirit Rising (2011) – Costume Designer
- Até Quando (2007) – Costume Designer

== Personal life ==
Marcasiano lives in New York with her husband, photographer Ralph Gibson.
