= 311 and 313 East 58th Street =

Houses in Manhattan, New York

- Houses at 311 and 313 East 58th Street
- U.S. National Register of Historic Places
- New York State Register of Historic Places
- New York City Landmark
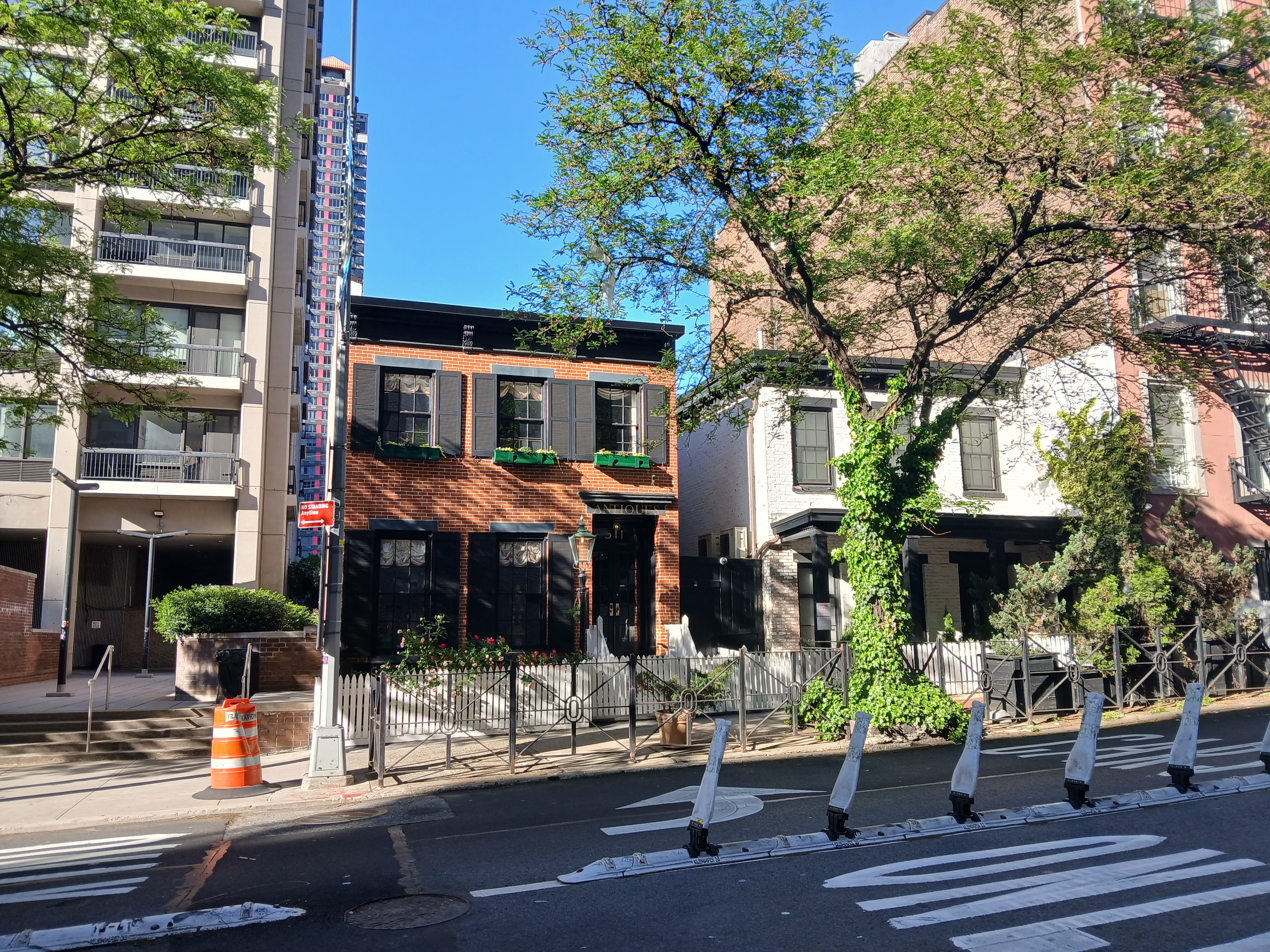
- View of 311 (left) and 313 East 58th Street (right) from across 58th Street

- Location within Manhattan Location within New York City Location within New York Location within the United States
- Location: 311–313 E. 58th St., Manhattan, New York, US
- Coordinates: 40°45′36″N 73°57′51″W
- Area: less than one acre
- Built: 1857
- Built by: Hiram G. Disbrow (House #313)
- Architectural style: Vernacular
- NRHP reference No.: 82001197
- NYSRHP No.: 06101.000109, 06101.002478
- NYCL No.: 0583, 0584

Significant dates
- Added to NRHP: November 14, 1982
- Designated NYSRHP: September 27, 1982
- Designated NYCL: May 25, 1967 (House #311); July 14, 1970 (House #313)

311 and 313 East 58th Street are a pair of houses on 58th Street in the Midtown East neighborhood of Manhattan in New York City, New York, US. The buildings were constructed between 1856 and 1857 and are both two stories high. Both houses are designed in a vernacular style, with brick facades, and cornices at their roofs. 311 East 58th Street has a wooden stoop above an areaway, which includes a second entrance to its basement. Next to it, 313 East 58th Street has a covered porch adjoining its entrance.

Over the years, both buildings have had numerous owners. Number 311 remained a residential building in the 20th century, with the Down family and the composer Charles Jones each owning that house for several decades. Meanwhile, number 313 hosted numerous commercial tenants, including the Humane Society of New York, the Paul's restaurant, the private nightclub Le Club, and a lounge called Two Rooms. By the 21st century, number 311 had become an antiques store, while number 313 had returned to being a private residence. The buildings are New York City designated landmarks and on the National Register of Historic Places.

== Description ==
311 and 313 East 58th Street are located on 58th Street in the Midtown East neighborhood of Manhattan in New York City, New York, US. Both buildings are two-story residences with below-grade front yards. Because the grade of 58th Street was raised to provide access to the Queensboro Bridge entrance ramp, the buildings are located slightly below the roadway, and the houses have no parking spots or vehicle loading areas due to local traffic restrictions. The houses are some of the few pre–American Civil War houses still surviving near Midtown Manhattan. The two combined sites have a frontage measuring 52 feet (16 m) wide along 58th Street and extending 100 feet (30 m) back from the sidewalk. The Modulightor Building is across Second Avenue to the west.

Number 311, the westerly of the two houses, is designed in a vernacular style and is set back behind a basement-level areaway, hidden behind a picket fence. The brick facade is divided vertically into three bays. At the eastern end of the building, a stoop of four wooden steps ascends from the sidewalk to the first story's entrance. The entrance consists of double glass-paneled double doors, with a transom window and a lintel above them. There is a secondary entrance to the basement beneath this stoop. The other openings in each bay contain double-hung sash windows. The windows on the second story have flower boxes outside them. Above the second story is a cornice supported by four scroll-shaped brackets. Over the years, the facade has remained unchanged.

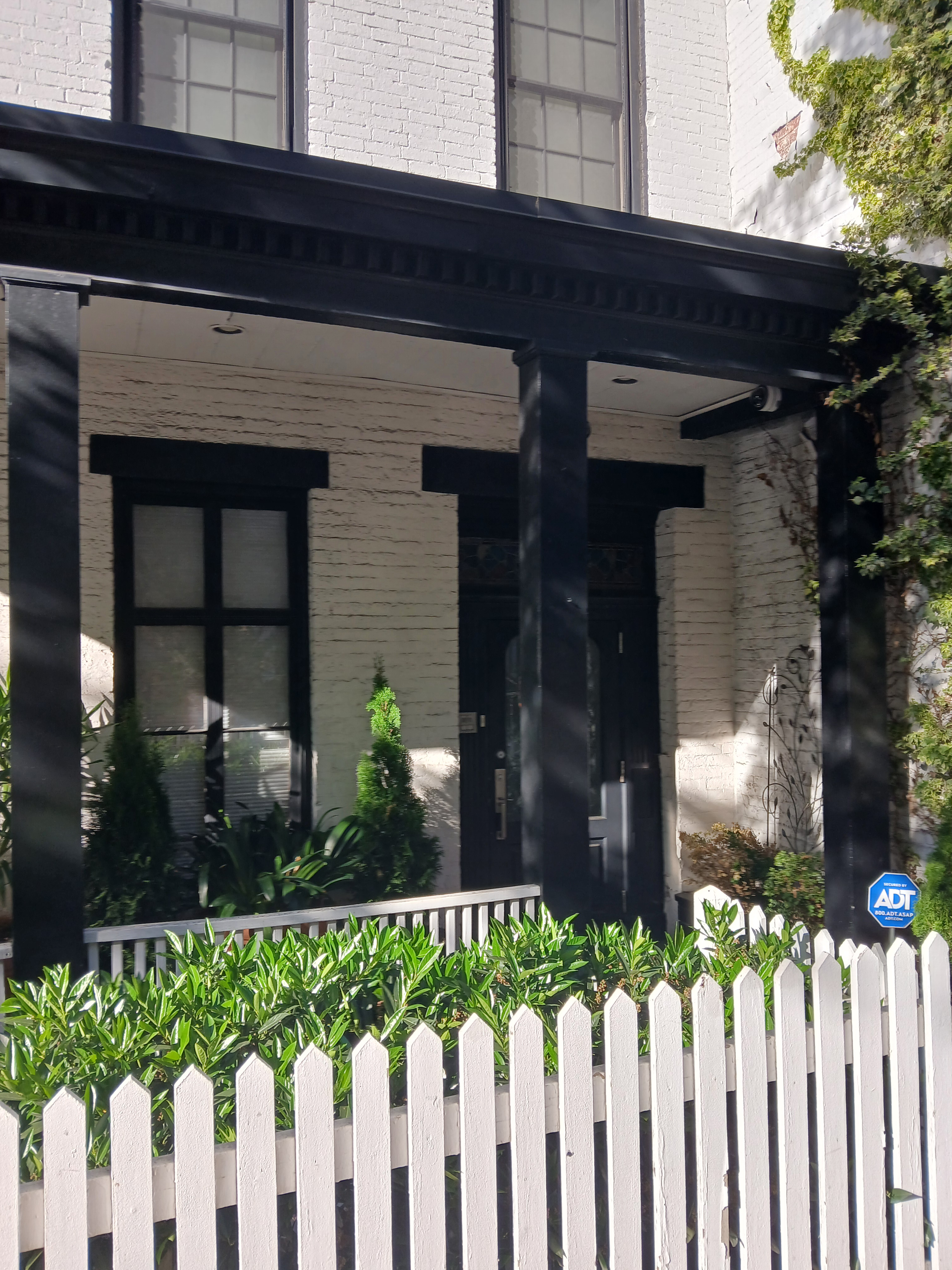
Entrance to number 313

Number 313, the eastern house, is also placed behind a picket fence. It is slightly more elaborate than number 311 and is designed in a vernacular style with Greek Revival details. The facade is made of brick with trim made of stone and wood, all of which have been painted. It is divided vertically into three bays, the easternmost of which contains a main entrance, flanked by square Greek Revival-inspired pilasters and topped by a series of brackets. In front of the ground story is a porch with a brick floor, which extends the entire width of the house. The facade under the porch has French doors, and there is also a series of dentils underneath the porch's roof. The second floor has simple rectangular double-hung sash windows with simple window sills below and lintels above. There is a flagpole on the second floor, and the cornice above number 313 is supported by small brackets.

== History ==
The houses stand on a plot of land that had been granted to John Danielson in 1676 and occupied by a tavern during the American colonial era. The site had various rural estates until the 19th century, when the opening of horse-drawn streetcar lines in the area prompted the development of middle-class rowhouses in Midtown Manhattan. This included the sites of 311 and 313 East 58th Street, which was sold to Hugh Gaine in 1791 and resold to Thomas Addis Emmet in 1829. Both buildings date from between 1856 and 1857. The house at number 313 was constructed by the contractor Hiram G. Disbrow, who lived there. Charles Shute Pell was recorded as the original owner of number 311 next door, although records indicate that another family member, Abijah Pell, initially occupied it. The Pell family sold number 311 to John B. Huse in 1873, and the house was subsequently resold in 1877, ending up in the ownership of Mathias Down. James Jordan was living in number 313 by the late 1890s, and at some point afterward, that house was acquired by Herman Weiden, a grandson of Mathias Down.

After more than four decades in the same ownership, the houses were acquired in April 1928 by the real-estate developer Milton Barkin, who planned to build a ten-story apartment building on the two sites for $500,000. The real-estate developer Samuel Brener bought the houses at 311 and 313 East 58th Street in January 1929 for $125,000, and the properties were resold the next year to the Hadingway Holding Corporation. Nothing came of any of these plans, and records indicate that these sales were never finalized, so the Weiden family retained the houses. By 1935, number 313 served as the headquarters for the Humane Society of New York. Weiden resold number 311 in 1950; the family had continuously occupied number 311 for seventy-three years. That house's buyer, the classical composer Charles Jones, owned it for nearly half a century. The Humane Society of New York renovated its clinic at 313 East 58th Street in 1954 and subsequently obtained two adjacent buildings in 1959 to expand its clinic.

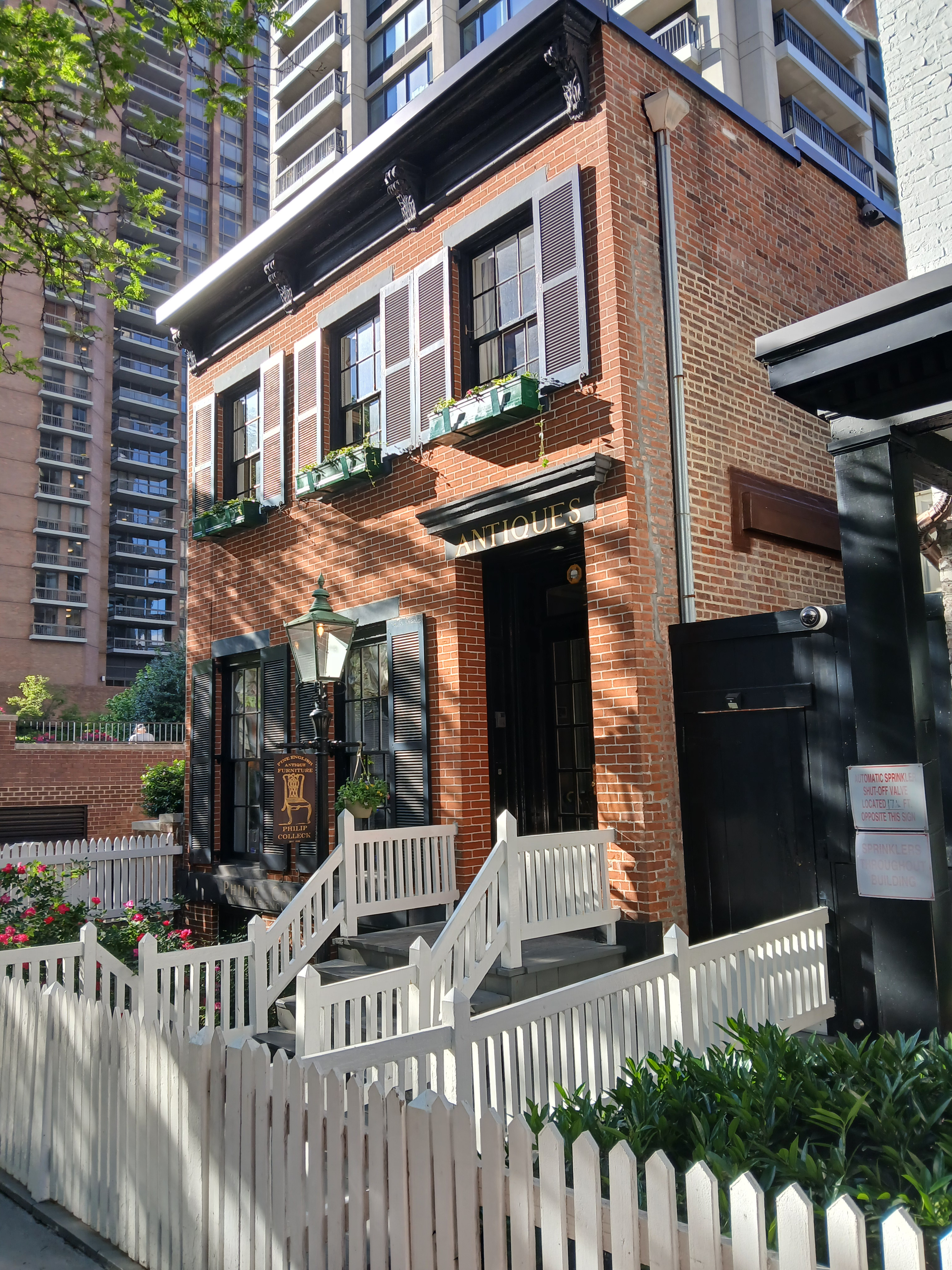
Entrance to number 311

The New York City Landmarks Preservation Commission designated the house at 311 East 58th Street as a New York City landmark on May 25, 1967, followed by 313 East 58th Street on July 14, 1970; these designations protected only the houses' exteriors. The Humane Society moved out of 313 East 58th Street in 1974, and the chef Paul Steindler had acquired it within two years, modifying the interior extensively. Steindler opened the Paul's restaurant at number 313 in 1977. Number 313's restaurant space became the private nightclub Le Club in 1981; the club had moved there in part because the house's 4,700-square-foot (440 m^{2}) interior was larger than the club's previous building and had a skylighted ceiling. The buildings were added to the National Register of Historic Places on November 14, 1982, as a single listing known as "Houses at 311 and 313 East 58th Street". After Le Club moved to the Waldorf Astoria New York hotel in 1996, Number 313 became a high-end lounge two years later; the lounge was known as Two Rooms, after the lounges on each of the house's separate floors. Two Rooms operated for a short time before it was forced to close, first because of a water leak, and later because it had no liquor license. Jones, meanwhile, continued to live at number 311 until his death in 1997.

The Landmark Club, a restaurant, moved into the Two Rooms space at number 313 in 1999. Mark and Diana Jacoby, the owners of the antiques store Philip Colleck, purchased number 311 the same year, with plans to restore it and open a store there. The Jacoby family subsequently renovated number 311's rooms to accommodate the store's merchandise. Joseph A. Olshefski, who had worked for several of 313 East 58th Street's previous tenants, listed that house for sale in 2009, seeking a buyer who would use it as a residence. The painter John Ransom Phillips acquired number 313 the next year, having been enticed in part by the skylights in the house's ceiling. Philip Colleck Ltd. continued to occupy the neighboring 311 East 58th Street.

== Reception ==
The writer Christopher Gray described number 311 as being "considered a splendid example of the simple dwellings that once dotted Midtown" in a 1999 article for The New York Times. In 1970, the architectural historian Adolf K. Placzek characterized Number 313 as "a little gem of human proportion". In a 2011 book about historic buildings in New York City, the historian Barbaralee Diamonstein-Spielvogel wrote that "these two charming vernacular houses" contrasted sharply with the skyscrapers around them. Similarly, the fifth edition of the AIA Guide to New York City characterized the houses as "vernacular of another era", nestled against the Queensboro Bridge's entrance.

== See also ==
- List of New York City Designated Landmarks in Manhattan from 14th to 59th Streets
- National Register of Historic Places in Manhattan from 14th to 59th Streets
