= Jelon Vieira =

Brazilian choreographer and teacher

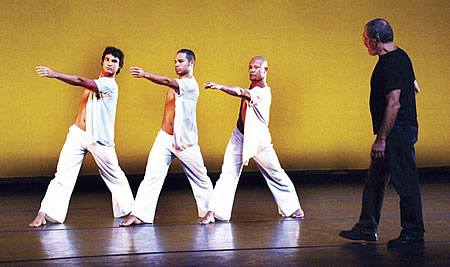
DanceBrazil Founder and Artistic Director Jelon Vieira (right) rehearses with his company in 2009.

Jelon Vieira is a Brazilian choreographer and teacher who, in 2000, achieved recognition by New York City's Brazilian Cultural Center as a pioneer in presenting to American audiences the Afro-Brazilian art and dance form, Capoeira.

In 1975, Vieira and fellow choreographer/performer Loremil Machado became the first capoeira mestres to live and teach in the United States. Vieira states that their first jobs in New York were doing capoeira demonstrations in Bronx public schools and that he spent the summer of 1975 doing weekly demonstrations in Central Park. His early supporters included choreographer Alvin Ailey, off-Broadway theater pioneer Ellen Stewart, and Brooklyn schoolteacher and martial artist Robert Cooper. In the 1970s, Vieira and Machado taught and performed in multiple locations across New York City, with notable venues including the Clark Center for the Performing Arts and "for four or five years," a weekly performance set to jazz music at the Cachaça nightclub on East 62nd Street.

For over a quarter century, as the founder and artistic director of The Capoeira Foundation, Vieira has guided the dance company, DanceBrazil through critically acclaimed engagements across the United States, including performances at Spoleto Festival USA, the Kennedy Center and Lincoln Center. The company has also toured in Europe, Asia and Brazil and has been featured on the PBS documentary series, EGG, the Arts Show and Alive from Off-Center.

Vieira has worked with numerous major cultural institutions, including NYC's Caribbean Cultural Center and San Antonio's Carver Community Cultural Center. In 1999, City Lore, a New York City community organization, inducted him into its Hall of Fame for lifetime contribution. In addition to his solo performances and works for DanceBrazil, his choreographic credits include the films Brenda Starr, Rooftops, and Boomerang.

For Times Square 2000, the globally televised, multinational 24-hour dance marathon in New York City, Vieira was chosen to create the only Brazilian performance. He has been a guest master teacher at Yale University, Oberlin College, Columbia University, Princeton University, Stanford University and other institutions.

In 2000, he was the Bacardi Distinguished Visiting Eminent Scholar at the University of Florida in Gainesville. He has taught Capoeira to legendary footballer Pelé and American movie stars Wesley Snipes and Eddie Murphy. Snipes, himself a top martial arts practitioner, has described Vieira as one of "the masters of the martial arts of the 20th century".

He is a recipient of a 2008 National Heritage Fellowship awarded by the National Endowment for the Arts, which is the United States government's highest honor in the folk and traditional arts.

Upon returning to Brazil, in his home community of Boca do Rio, a bairro of the nation's third-largest city, Salvador, Vieira continues to teach children and young adults the art of Capoeira to build self-esteem, instill self-discipline and raise social consciousness while at the same time becoming a vital part of their own community. In 2007, after having devoted many years to Grupo Capoeira Brasil, he founded Grupo Capoeira Luanda.
