= Charles Jones (composer) =

Canadian-born music educator and composer (1910–1997)

Charles Jones (June 21, 1910 – June 6, 1997) was a Canadian-born music educator and composer of contemporary classical music who lived and worked mainly in the United States.

== Early life and education ==
Jones was born in Tamworth, Lennox and Addington County, Ontario, Canada. He moved to Toronto at the age of ten, eventually traveling to New York City in 1928. He studied at the Juilliard School, where his primary instructor was Bernard Wagenaar.

== Career ==
By 1937 Jones had composed a number of classical works; that year a concert by Francis James and his string quartet, consisting entirely of Jones' compositions, was held in Toronto at the Eaton Auditorium.

Jones began teaching at Mills College in California from 1939 to 1944, and at the Music Academy of the West in 1949 and 1950. From 1951 on he taught at the Aspen Festival, where he met and worked with Darius Milhaud. He taught at the Juilliard School between 1954 and 1960, and again in 1973. During the 1970s he taught composition at the Mannes College of Music, starting in 1972. His works have been performed by the New York Philharmonic and the National Symphony Orchestra.

The music critic Tim Page and composer Walter Buczynski were among Jones's notable students.

Jones lived at 311 East 58th Street, a house in Manhattan designated as an official New York City landmark, from 1950 until his death in 1997.

== Discography ==
- Charles Jones: New & Historcial Recordings, 2005, Albany Music Distribution
