= Karen Mixon Cook =

American disco DJ

- Born: 1955; Birmingham, Alabama
- Years active: 1974-present
- Known for: First female disco DJ

Karen Mixon Cook (born 1955) became the first professional female nightclub disco disc jockey (“Disco DJ”) in the United States in 1974. While there had been female professional radio disc jockeys in the U.S. since at least 1966, none had been focused on the disco club music scene.

== Early life ==
Born Karen Mixon in 1955 in Birmingham, Alabama, Karen moved with her family to Houston, Texas, in July, 1970. Growing up, she was fascinated by dance and studied ballet, jazz, tap, and modern dance. She grew up listening to her parents 1940's dance music and often watched them jitterbug in the living room. Karen's father, Edward Mixon, jitterbugged with her when she was eight years old at a Lion's Club in Akron, Ohio, and it made the local paper. These experiences influenced her art and the importance of dance beats when she became a DJ.

== Education ==
Graduating high school in December 1973, Karen entered North Texas State University in early 1974 (now called University of North Texas) in Denton, Texas, where she studied basic courses and marketing/sales. In December 1975, she returned to Houston, Texas.

== DJ career ==
Cook's first professional engagement as a disco DJ was in early 1974 during her first year at North Texas State at “Jim and Lonnie’s” college bar. She worked five nights per week interspersing songs like the Jackson 5 hit, Dancin’ Machine, George McCrae's Rock Your Baby, and Bachman Turner Overdrive's Taking Care of Business with the bar's standard country music theme.

In 1976, just after Cook's return to Houston, she earned full-time employment as a DJ at Sheraton Oaks Town and Country, which was a rooftop bar in a Sheraton hotel, where she mixed disco music featuring KC and the Sunshine Band, Tavares, Wild Cherry, Commodores, Bee Gees and of course the greatest love songs from that era by Barry White and Lou Rawls to generate excitement, romance, and a stronger dance vibe. Sheraton Oaks included information about the new female DJ in their radio commercials.

In 1976 Karen was recruited by McFaddin Ventures, a national nightclub operator. She was hired as DJ at their highest rated and most lucrative nightclub in Houston: Todd's. It was located in a strip center on Richmond and 610 loop in the Galleria area. A few months later, she was promoted to DJ and Programmer (selecting the best songs and recommending segways) for all of their nightclubs, including the new members'-only club, ‘Elan.

In 2009, Cook was interviewed by the BBC which was edited for the BBC Music Special, “The Death of Disco” in 2009, considered the 30th anniversary of the Death of Disco. Disco Demolition Night, an anti-disco protest held in Chicago, IL, on July 12, 1979, is commonly considered a factor in disco's fast and drastic decline. Cook was quoted as saying, “Every July 12th we still hold a moment of silence for the death of disco.”

== Musical style ==
Cook mixed a seamless sequence of dance songs mostly undetectable by dancers on the floor; songs blended from one to another because she listened to music in advance, wrote beats per minute on album covers, noting times for specific breaks in songs that would allow a good transition to the next song's break point. She used Technics SL-1200MK2 direct-drive turntables, which were equipped with adjustable speed, slip pads, and a conical needle, which was rounded on all sides and allowed her to rock records back and forth to match beats between songs without damaging the album. This technique was called a segway or mixing, but is now called beatmatching.

Cook's specialty was creating music in a 6/3 format; 6 progressively building fast songs which immediately dropped to 3 slow songs. This technique caused drink sales to increase; as she explains, “There are 2 kinds of dancers in the club, the fast dancer and the slow dancer. While the fast dancers are wearing themselves out, sweating profusely on the dancefloor, the slow dancers are nursing a drink or two, waiting to feel that body to body contact on the slow songs. Then the fast dancers have a seat, wiping down sweat and guzzling drinks while waiting for the next fast set. This creates a continuous flow of alcohol which equated to surges in sales.”

== Musical background ==
Although only 16 and under the legal age for entering a bar, Cook began studying discreetly under Sam Meyer who DJ’d at the Barbary Coast nightclub in Houston, Texas where she reports she fell in love with disco. “I was too young to go to a discotheque, but a woman I would babysit for wanted to take someone with her so she took me on occasion. She would tell people I was her family and they would let me in. The doorman knew me after a while and eventually allowed me to come on my own. Watching Sam was so fascinating and I could think of nothing better than playing music and dancing all night! Sitting in the DJ booth, watching Sam match beats and control the dancefloor resonated with the dancer inside me and created a love for the Disco.” Cook began to go to other discos to learn from DJs in Houston who had other techniques. Her favorite was Ram Rocha, who DJ'd at a gay bar in town, and played mostly European ("Europop") music that was not popular in the straight bars.

Record companies provided records for free to both nightclub and radio DJs. Many of Cook's library of albums were provided by record companies (called promo copy) which had a hole punched in the top right corner to keep people from reselling them. The advent of the 12-inch single in the 1970s, introduced by DJ Tom Moulton, made a louder sound possible and a wider overall dynamic range but more importantly allowed bathroom breaks for DJ's as well.
