= DanceBrazil =

Music and dance company in New York, US

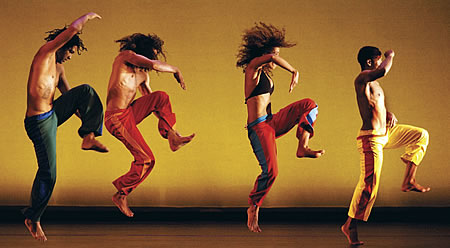
DanceBrazil performs Ritmos, choreographed by Artistic Director Jelon Vieira.

DanceBrazil is an American dance company based out of New York City, which presents works based upon the dance and music of the Brazilian culture. The company particularly excels in performances of works from the Afro-Brazilian artistic movement, particularly capoeira, and contemporary dances. The company performs for over 25,000 people each year nationwide.

Founded in 1977 under the name Capoeiras of Bahia by Jelon Vieira at the Clark Center for the Performing Arts, the company changed its name to DanceBrazil early on its history under the advice of lauded choreographer Alvin Ailey who was an early artistic collaborator and supporter of the organization. Since 1984 the company has been supported by the National Endowment for the Arts and in 2008 Vieira was honored with a National Heritage Fellowship for his work with the company.
