= Ralph Gibson =

American photographer (born 1939)

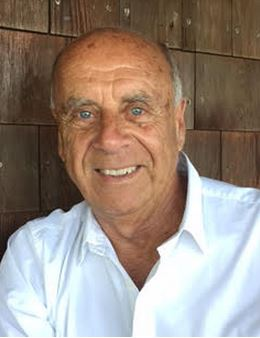
- Born: January 16, 1939 (age 87); Los Angeles, California, U.S.
- Known for: Photography
- Spouse: Mary Jane Marcasiano
- Awards: Guggenheim Fellowship
- Website: ralphgibson.com

Ralph Gibson (born January 16, 1939) is an American art photographer best known for his photographic books. His images often incorporate fragments with erotic and mysterious undertones, building narrative meaning through contextualization and surreal juxtaposition.

== Early life and education ==
Gibson enlisted in the United States Navy in 1956 and became a Photographers Mate studying photography until 1960. He then continued his photography studies at the San Francisco Art Institute between 1960 and 1962.

== Work ==
He began his professional career as an assistant to Dorothea Lange from 1961 to 1962 and went on to work with Robert Frank on two films between 1967 and 1968.

Gibson has maintained a lifelong fascination with books and book-making. Since the appearance in 1970 of The Somnambulist, his work has been steadily impelled towards the printed page. In 1969 Gibson moved to New York, where he formed Lustrum Press in order to exert control over the reproduction of his work. Lustrum Press also published Larry Clark's Tulsa (1971). To date he has produced over 40 monographs, the more recent being State of the Axe (Yale University Press, 2008) and Nude (Taschen, 2009). His photographs are included in over one hundred and fifty museum collections around the world, and have appeared in hundreds of exhibitions. Including his own private museum in Busan, Korea, Goeun Museum of Photography. He has worked exclusively with the Leica M 35mm rangefinder cameras for almost 50 years.

Asked by The New York Times for the photography books that were his main sources of inspiration, Gibson recommended what he considered to be five seminal works: Eugene Atget's Vision of Paris, Walker Evans's American Photographs, Henri Cartier-Bresson's Decisive Moment, Robert Frank's The Americans and Alexey Brodovitch's Ballet.

Commissioned by Italian luxury label Bottega Veneta, Gibson photographed models Raquel Zimmermann and Mathias Lauridsen on locations in Milan for the brand's fall/winter 2013 advertisements. Gibson's Hand Through a Doorway was used on the inner sleeve of the 1979 album Unknown Pleasures by UK rock band Joy Division. A unique set with prints of the Beatles was made by Gibson in August 1966 for a proposed book for Capitol Records.

In the summer 2016, on the occasion of the opening of the Galerie Thierry Bigaignon, Gibson presented a new series of color photographs entitled Vertical Horizon.

== Personal life ==
Gibson currently lives in New York with his wife, fashion designer Mary Jane Marcasiano and travels frequently to Europe and Brazil.

== Awards ==
- 1973: National Endowment for the Arts fellowship
- 1975: National Endowment for the Arts fellowship
- 1977: Deutscher Akademischer Austauschdienst (DAAD), Berlin
- 1977: New York State Council on the Arts (C.A.P.S.) fellowship
- 1985: Guggenheim Fellowship from the John Simon Guggenheim Memorial Foundation
- 1986: Decorated as an Officier de L'Ordre des Arts et des Lettres by the French government
- 1986: National Endowment for the Arts fellowship
- 1988: Leica Medal of Excellence Award
- 1989: "150 Years of Photography" Award, Photographic Society of Japan
- 1991: Honorary doctorate of Fine Arts from the University of Maryland
- 1994: Grande Medaille de la Ville d'Arles
- 1998: Honorary doctorate from the Ohio Wesleyan University
- 2002: Appointed Commandeur de L'Ordre des Arts et des Lettres by the French government
- 2007: Lucie Award for lifetime achievement in Fine Art.
- 2015: Guild Hall Academy of the Arts Lifetime Award
- 2018: Appointed Chevalier de la Légion d'honneur
- 2023: Royal Photographic Society Centenary Medal and Honorary Fellowship.

== Publications ==
Selection and sequencing of the photographs and the layout of each book were usually determined by Ralph Gibson. Each series of work, like the trilogy and Chiaroscuro, is at least accompanied by a short statement. In other publications there are explanatory texts with biographical, esthetic and also practical considerations, particularly in more recent books.

- The Somnambulist. Lustrum Press, New York 1970. ISBN 0-912810-09-2.
- Déjà-Vu. Lustrum, New York 1973. ISBN 0-912810-06-8.
- Days at Sea. Lustrum, New York 1975. ISBN 0-912810-15-7.
- Syntax. Lustrum, New York 1983. ISBN 0-912810-39-4.
- L'Anonyme. Aperture/Contrejour, New York/Paris 1986. ISBN 978-0-89381-249-2.
- Tropism. Catalogue accompanying the first retrospective at International Center of Photography (ICP), curated by Miles Barth, Aperture, New York 1987. ISBN 0-89381-274-9; HC: ISBN 0-893812-55-2. UK ed.: Phaidon, Oxford, ISBN 0-7148-2502-6; Italian ed.: Alinari, Florence, ISBN 88-7292-096-5 (and presumably a Japanese ed.)
- À propos de Mary Jane. Cahier d'images/Contrejour, Paris 1990. ISBN 2-85949-899-0.
- Chiaroscuro. Marval, 1990. ISBN 978-2-86234-045-6.
- L'Histoire de France. Preface by Marguerite Duras. Aperture/Paris Audiovisuel, New York/Paris 1991. ISBN 978-0-89381-471-7.
- Infanta. Introduction by Alexandra Anderson-Spivy, text by Gibson, afterword by Mary Gaitskill. Takarajima, New York/Tokio 1995. ISBN 978-1-883489-13-7.
- Lichtjahre. Catalogue accompanying the exhibition at Frankfurter Kunstverein in Germany, ed. by Peter Weiermair. Edition Stemmle, Zürich 1996. ISBN 978-3-908162-29-2; HC: ISBN 978-3-908162-27-8.
- Overtones. Diptychs and Proportions. Introduction by curator Tom Beck, texts by Gibson, Max Kozloff, Sarah Greenough, Eric Fischl a. o. Edition Stemmle, Zürich 1998. ISBN 978-3-908161-10-3.
- Deus ex machina. Retrospective book, ed. by Simone Philippi. Introduction and texts to the series by Gibson, chronology by Miles Barth, annex. Taschen, Köln 1999, ISBN 3-8228-6607-5 (Engl./French/German).
- Ex libris. Photographs and Constructs. Text by Gibson. PowerHouse, New York 2001. ISBN 1-57687-100-2. Limited edition, ISBN 1-57687-114-2.
- Brazil. Damiani, Bologna 2005. ISBN 88-89431-12-1.
- Light Strings: Impressions of the Guitar. With Andy Summers. Chronicle, 2004. ISBN 0-8118-4324-6.
- Refractions. Maison Européenne de la Photographie/Steidl, Paris/Göttingen 2006. ISBN 978-3-86521-079-1.
- State of the Axe: Guitar Masters in Photographs and Words. Exhibition catalogue. Preface by Anne Wilkes Tucker, introduction by Les Paul. Museum of Fine Arts, Houston (Tx) 2008. ISBN 978-0-300-14211-2.
- Nude. Conversation between Gibson and Eric Fischl. „Collector's edition“ of 1200 copies. Taschen, Köln 2009, ISBN 978-3-8365-1189-6 (Engl./French/German).
  - Re-edition: Taschen, Köln 2018. ISBN 978-3-8365-6888-3 (Engl./French/German).
- {Passé Imparfait}. Exhibition and book featuring early photographs 1960–1970. Texts by Gibson and Gilles Mora. Centre national des arts plastiques, Contrejour, Paris 2012. ISBN 979-10-90294-05-9 (French/Engl.).
- Mono. Lustrum, New York 2013. ISBN 978-1-4675-8529-3 (Engl./Chinese).
- Political Abstraction. Exhibition catalogue of a work series with color and black-and-white photographs. Mary Boone Gallery, New York, and Center for Creative Photography (CCP), Tucson. Lustrum, New York 2015. ISBN 978-1-4773-0994-0.
- The Black Trilogy. Text by Gilles Mora. University of Texas Press, Austin 2017. ISBN 978-1-4773-1626-9.
- Self-Exposure. Autobiography. Heni, 2018. ISBN 978-1-912122-10-3.
- Sacred Land: Israel Before and After Time. Preface by Martin Cohen, afterword by Rabbi David Ellenson. Lustrum, New York 2020. ISBN 978-1-942884-69-9.
- Refractions 2. Lustrum, New York 2021.
- Salon Littéraire. France 1971–2022. Lustrum Press/Brilliant Graphics, New York 2023.
- Secret of Light. Catalogue accompanying the retrospective at Deichtorhallen Hamburg, hrsg. von Sabine Schnakenberg. Kehrer, Heidelberg 2023. ISBN 9783969001042 (German/Engl.).

=== Contributions to publications and as editor ===
Beside his role as founder and co-editor of Lustrum Press, Ralph Gibson contributed photographs, contact sheets and explanatory texts to publications, especially to Lustrum's Theory series.

- Darkroom. Ed. by Wynn Bullock. Photographs and essay by Gibson a. o. Lustrum, New York 1977. ISBN 0-912810-20-3, Pb: ISBN 0-912810-19-X.
- Nude: Theory. Ed. by Jain Kelly. Photographs and essay by Gibson a. o. Lustrum, New York 1979. ISBN 0-912810-24-6, Pb: ISBN 0-912810-33-5, S. 73–93.
- SX-70 Art. Ed. by Gibson, introduction by Max Kozloff, texts by Isaac Asimov and Victor McElheny. Lustrum, New York 1979. ISBN 0-912810-23-8.
- Landscape: Theory. Ed. by John Flattau, Ralph Gibson and Arne Lewis. Lustrum, New York 1980. ISBN 0-912810-27-0.
- Contact: Theory. Ed. by Robert Adams. Photographs and essay by Gibson a. o. Lustrum, New York 1982. ISBN 0-912810-31-9.
- Portrait: Theory. Ed. by John Flattau, Ralph Gibson and Arne Lewis. Lustrum, New York 1981. ISBN 0-912810-34-3. (No contribution by Gibson apart from the cover photograph.)
- Nine by Nine. Photographs and essay by Gibson a. o. Lustrum, New York 1984. ISBN 0-912810-47-5.
- Ralph Gibson: Early Work. In: The Archive 24. Center for Creative Photography, Tucson, AZ, 1987.

== Collections ==
Ralph Gibson's work is represented in countless public, private and corporate collections worldwide. Almost 50 universities in the USA have exhibits by him in their collections. In New York alone, six important museums, the MoMA, the Whitney Museum, the Metropolitan Museum of Art, the International Center of Photography, the Brooklyn Museum and the George Eastman House in Rochester, have numerous photographs by him in their collections. In addition to many other American museums, Gibson's photographs can also be found in several Australian, Japanese, Israeli, German, Italian and French collections, as well as in institutions in other countries.

- Stedelijk Museum, Amsterdam
- University of Michigan Museum of Art, Ann Arbor
- Museum of Fine Arts, Houston
- J. Paul Getty Museum, Los Angeles
- Kemper Museum of Contemporary Art, Missouri
- Vanderbilt University Fine Arts Gallery, Nashville
- International Center of Photography (ICP), New York
- Metropolitan Museum of Art, New York
- Museum of Modern Art, NewYork
- Whitney Museum of American Art, New York
- International Photography Hall of Fame, St. Louis
- National Gallery of Art, Washington, D.C.
- Ralph Gibson Museum, Busan, South Korea

== Exhibitions ==
- Rencontres d'Arles festival presented his work in 1975, 1976, 1977, 1979, 1989 and 1994.
