= Olivier Coquelin =

French expatriate entrepreneur (1937–2010)

- Born: 1937; Paris, France
- Died: January 12, 2010 (aged 72–73); Haiti
- Occupations: Nightclub owner, promoter
- Known for: Creating the first discotheque in the United States

Olivier Coquelin (1937 – January 12, 2010) was a French expatriate entrepreneur and nightclub owner and promoter, based in Manhattan, New York City.

== Career ==
Coquelin, was born in Paris, France in 1937, on New Year's Eve 1960 he opened Le Club, a members-only restaurant and nightclub, credited as being the first American discotheque, on East 55th Street in Manhattan, New York. an achievement that would earn him the nickname Disco Daddy.

By 1962, The New York Times, discussing and defining the new term "jet-set," used Coquelin and members of Le Club as paradigmatic examples.

In 1966, together with business partner Borden Stevenson, son of politician Adlai Stevenson, he opened Cheetah, a three-story disco on Broadway near 53rd Street with satellite locations following in New Jersey, Chicago and Los Angeles. In 1970, he opened Hippopotamus on East 54th Street. New York Magazine reported that Hippopotamus was "heir to the discotheque crown," attracting "literary lions like George Plimpton and eagles of wealth and politics like Onassis and Edward Kennedy," and featured a 2,400 square foot dance floor where one might find "transvestites in stretch jumpsuits unbuttoned provocatively to the waist, girls in stainless steel blouses, and men in ankle-length curly white lamb coats."

By 1977, Hippopotamus had moved to East 62nd Street, where Coquelin added a Brazilian-themed nightclub upstairs from the disco, called Cachaça. The opening occasioned a full profile of Coquelin in Andy Warhol's Interview Magazine.
