= Disco pants =

Type of shiny trousers

Disco pants (also known as disco jeans, spandex disco pants and spandex disco jeans) are a type of pants or trousers created in the style of denim jeans and originally made from a combination of nylon and spandex (later polyester) designed to be completely form-fitting with a high shine and high waist.

== Origin ==
Disco pants origins has been contested. San Francisco in the late 1960s is sourced by many fashion experts as the birthplace of Disco Pants. They are form-fitting, high-waist unisex stretch pants made from a heavyweight Nylon/Elastane blend that creates a flattering slimming effect.

Though the pants worn by Olivia Newton-John towards the end of the 1978 film Grease were not disco pants themselves, they served as the catalyst and inspiration for what became known as disco pants shortly thereafter. These pants could be seen worn by both males and females during the period starting in late 1978 through the mid 1980s.

== Background ==
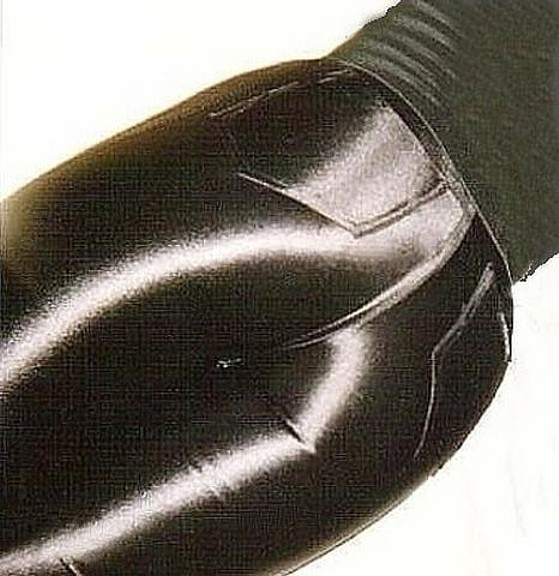
Black spandex disco pants

1970s disco meant wearing clothing that could attract attention and reflect the distinctive disco lighting. From hot pants to platform shoes to polyester shirts and gold chains, the disco style was not appropriate for everyday life. But come evening, disco dress for men and women alike strove for a flashy, look-at-me style that would attract the spotlight and stand out on the dance floor.

Women's clothing in the disco era was about looking good while being able to move on the dance floor. Tight, restrictive skirts were seldom seen, but glitzy dresses with free-flowing skirts or bright, satin hot pants and sequinned tops were all the rage. Taking their inspiration from dance wear, jumpsuits made out of Lycra or spandex accentuated a woman's body while still allowing her to show off her dance skills.

== Popularity ==
Male music artists such as Leif Garrett, Shaun Cassidy, the Brothers Johnson, Menudo (band) and John Waite among others wore disco pants during performances. Female music artists including Dottie West, The Nolans, Tina Turner, Kate Bush, The Mandrell Sisters, Sheena Easton, Yuri (Mexican singer), Christie Allen, Crystal Gayle and many others could be seen sporting the pants. Additionally, during this period many actors and actresses could be seen wearing these pants in movies and television shows. Solid Gold (TV series), a weekly American television show about hit music, regularly featured both male and female dancers in disco pants.

The most widely known brands of disco pants from this era includes Frederick's of Hollywood, Le Gambi, Bojeangles, Michi, Jonden, Tight End and Trousers Up. All brands usually featured 2 back pockets, though 1 pocket versions were also available but were less common. Additionally the pants featured a button/buttonhole closure or snap button closure and a metal or plastic zipper. Some models featured belt loops.

== Materials ==
A fabric made of or containing a polyurethane fiber with elastic properties form-fitting, high-waist stretch pants made from a heavyweight stretchy material such as spandex, polyester and Lycra were the fabrics of choice during the disco era. Because these fabrics could fit tightly and cling to the body, clothing made of such material was very much in demand. Bold, dramatic colors and wild, geometric patterns were all the rage. Shiny, light-reflecting fabrics such as satin's and silks as well as gold lamé or sequin-encrusted garments could make the perfect disco statement.

== 2007 revival ==
Pop celebrities such as Jessie J have started wearing them again, progressing from the 1970s there might be coming out with the jacket that go with the pants.

In 2008, American clothing manufacturer American Apparel reintroduced disco pants to the buying public, albeit in a version slightly different from the original from 30 years earlier. This new disco pant featured a super skinny fit and are generally considered to be leggings, as they are form-fitting from the waist all the way down to the hems. In all other respects, this updated disco pant retained the characteristics of the originals, including material content, high, waist, rear pockets and button/zipper closure. The revived disco pant as made by American Apparel deeply influenced worldwide fashion circles and opened the market to many similar disco pants as made by other manufacturers. Unlike the original version, these new disco pants are strictly marketed to women and are worn mostly by them.

As of 2014, the modern version of disco pants remains available for sale and is still widely popular. Additionally, disco pants true to the original straight-leg fit and unisex appeal are being newly made in a revival of some of the original brand names.
