= Cheetah (nightclub) =

Nightclub in Manhattan, New York, US

- Poster advertising the club
- Interactive map of Cheetah
- Former names: Arcadia Ballroom
- Address: (1966–1968) 1686 Broadway (near 53rd Street) (Oct 1968–onward) 310 W. 52nd St. (near Eighth Ave.)
- Location: Manhattan, New York City
- Coordinates: 40.7634°N 73.9829°W
- Owner: Olivier Coquelin and Borden Stevenson
- Capacity: 2,000
- Type: Nightclub

Construction
- Opened: April 27, 1966
- Closed: 1970s

Cheetah was a nightclub located at 1686 Broadway near 53rd Street in Manhattan, New York City. The club opened on April 27, 1966, and closed in the 1970s. The financial backing was provided by Borden Stevenson, son of politician Adlai Stevenson, and Olivier Coquelin. Robert Hilsky and Russell Hilsky were associated with the club.

By 1967, Cheetah clubs were located in New York City, Los Angeles, Chicago, and Montreal. The club lent its name to Cheetah magazine, a counterculture publication put out by Twenty First Century Communications, Inc. in 1967–1968.

In the 1970s, Cheetah became a popular Latin-American dance club that helped popularize salsa music to mainstream America.

== Venues ==
=== New York City ===
==== 1686 Broadway ====
Cheetah's first location, at the site of the former Riviera Terrace (adjacent to the Ed Sullivan Theater), was thought to be the largest club in the world, with three levels, and a capacity of 2,000 people. The ceiling featured 3,000 colored lights illuminating a giant mobile made of huge sheets of chrome created by industrial designer Michael Lax. The venue included a boutique that sold "the latest Carnaby Street fashions." No alcohol was served at the club; the only refreshments were soft drinks, sandwiches, and hot dogs.

"Reporting on the opening of Cheetah, ... the New York Times film reviewer Vincent Canby noted that in addition to a giant dance floor and a room big enough to seat eighteen hundred, the club would have rooms devoted to television, Scopitone (the pre-MTV 16-mm musical jukebox), and 'movies in the Andy Warhol–Batman genre.'"

According to author Steven Watson, Cheetah "was the granddaddy of the big commercial disco". In the book Last Night a DJ Saved My Life, authors Bill Brewster and Frank Broughton described Cheetah:

The cavernous space had a dance floor with circular podiums scattered randomly like outsized polka dots. Each supported a girl frugging.... And there was smooth and soft black velvet everywhere — except the bar, which was covered in fake fur. In the basement, there was a TV room, and on the upper floor, a cinema showed the latest, strangest, underground movies.

Fashion writer Joel Lobenthal described the club's vibe:

By the time Cheetah opened ... the discotheque had become a self-contained Aladdin's Cave, in which the visitor surrendered his or her everyday identity in search of Dionysian transport. Cheetah employed many conspiring elements to bedazzle its switched-on congregation.

An article in The Seattle Times called the club, "a self-service discotheque, with ... way-out types in silver dungarees and knees that glow." The article continued:

Down there on noisy Broadway on 54th Street, crowds press against ropes and nose the windows, impatient to be admitted. Inside there are writhing lads in silver dungarees or sequined suits. There are undulating lasses in barely there dresses or metallic space helmets and pants, [and] jeweled eyelids....

Patrons at the club invented their own line dance, the "Cheetah Shuffle." Admission to the club was $4.00. Cheetah closed at some point before October 1968.

==== 310 West 52nd Street ====
In October 1968, Cheetah reopened at 310 W. 52nd St., near Eighth Ave. (formerly the Palm Gardens), right across the street from the Roseland Ballroom. A former club patron described the new location:

"The new Cheetah ... had two levels. The first floor was for the dance floor and the bands, and there was a soda fountain that was also called the 'Poster Room.' The second floor had a small dance floor but mostly tables and chairs around a balcony that overlooked the ... dance floor. There was a very long and beautiful bar but it was never attended or stocked. There was a smaller room that was for a small live band and it was called the 'Mattress Room.'

In late December 1969, the club served as an American Red Cross shelter for victims of a local Midtown fire.

=== Chicago ===
Cheetah Chicago, located at 1121 West Lawrence Avenue (the location of the Aragon Ballroom) operated from October 1966 to June 1968. A bomb went off in the club on November 1, 1966, two weeks after it opened. The club being closed at the time, no one was injured. The Turtles played two shows at Cheetah in April 1968.

=== Los Angeles ===
Cheetah Los Angeles was located in the former Aragon Ballroom on Lick Pier in Santa Monica. It operated from February 1967 to c. June 1968. Bands who played at Cheetah L.A. included the Grateful Dead, The Doors, Alice Cooper, Pink Floyd, Love, The Mothers of Invention, The Seeds, and Buffalo Springfield.

== Reception ==
Filmmaker and activist Jonas Mekas wrote, "Cheetah was designed for the masses. An attempt was made to go over the persona, over the ego, to reach the impersonal, abstract, universal." "Each girl was more electric than the next," Eugenia Sheppard reported. "The swinging hair. The wild colors. The mini-mini-skirts." Life magazine wrote that everybody at the club looked like "a kook in a Kubla Khanteen.

== Live performances ==
The New York City Cheetah featured nightly live performances, often by house bands like The Denims, supported by Curtis Knight and the Squires (with a young Jimi Hendrix) (performing April 28 – May 18, 1966); and later by The Esquires, Mike St. Shaw and the Prophets, and the Thunder Frog Ensemble, "covering pop and soul hits of the day."

In October 1966, Audio Fidelity Records recorded a live show by The Esquires, Mike St. Shaw and the Prophets, and the Thunder Frog Ensemble, releasing it as Where It's At — Cheetah (1966, AFSD 6168).

The musical Hair played a limited run at Cheetah from December 22, 1967 to January 1968 before becoming a major production on Broadway.

Other bands that played at Cheetah included the Commodores, Gary Puckett & The Union Gap, Sam the Sham and the Pharoahs, the Bagatelles, and the Chicago Loop. In the summer of 1969, the West 52nd Street location hosted the bands Johnny Maestro and The Brooklyn Bridge and Larry Davis and the Marvels.

Other notable live performances included:

- October 29, 1966: The Reasons Why
- April 11, 1967: The Velvet Underground and Tiny Tim — a benefit for WBAI, billed as "An Imperial Happening" to mark "the coronation of his Serene Highness, Prince Robert, first American Emperor of the Eastern Byzantine Roman Empire."
- November 12, 1967: Pink Floyd — first New York show
- December 31, 1967: Mike St. Shaw and the Prophets, Band of Gold, the Dave Hennan Set, and the Scarecrow — New Year's Eve show
- December 31, 1968: The Brooklyn Bridge and four other bands — New Year's Eve show

== Latin-American/salsa club ==
In the 1970s, Cheetah's New York venue became a popular Latin-American dance club that helped popularize salsa to mainstream America. It is widely cited as the birthplace of salsa music, or at least of the popular use of the term "salsa" to denote pan-Latin music brewing in New York City.

On Thursday, August 26, 1971, the Fania All-Stars headlined the club and drew an overflowing and excited crowd that was later captured on film as Our Latin Thing. The Fania All-Stars brought together the leading lights in Latin music styles (descarga, mambo, boogaloo, merengue, folkloric) and presented a single concert drawing from these diverse influences. Although the term "salsa" had been used in Latin music dating back to at least Pupi Legarreta's 1962 LP Salsa Nova, this modern combination of styles being presented at the Cheetah club began to become popularly known under the umbrella term "salsa".
