= Le Club =

Defunct nightclub in Manhattan, New York

Coordinates: 40°45′23″N 73°57′46″W

- Interactive map of Le Club

Restaurant information
- Established: 1960
- Food type: French cuisine
- Location: 416 East 55th Street (original location), New York City, New York, United States
- Reservations: Members only
- Other locations: 313 East 58th Street; Waldorf Astoria New York

Le Club was a members-only restaurant and nightclub located at 416 East 55th Street in Manhattan, New York City. It was considered one of the first American discotheques.

== History ==
On New Year's Eve in 1960, French expatriate Olivier Coquelin founded the members-only discotheque, Le Club. It was frequented by the elites of New York City, including the Vanderbilts and Kennedys, and members of royalty. As a young man in the 1970s, Donald Trump frequented the club, particularly associating with Roy Cohn.

In the 1970s, the club repeatedly failed New York City health code inspections despite its status among socialites. The club was cited for mouse excrement in storage and locker areas.

The club moved to 313 East 58th Street in 1981, then to the Waldorf Astoria New York in 1996.

An early board of directors at Le Club included Oleg Cassini, the then-Duke of Bedford, Ian Russell, Rex Harrison, Nicholas Biddle, and Alan Jay Lerner, among others.
