= Clark Center for the Performing Arts =

Performing arts center in Arroyo Grande, California

- Clark Center for the Performing Arts in 2026
- Interactive map of Clark Center for the Performing Arts
- Address: 487 Fair Oaks Avenue; Arroyo Grande, California; United States
- Coordinates: 35.1163°N 120.5819°W
- Owner: Lucia Mar Unified School District
- Capacity: Forbes Hall: approx. 600; Studio Theatre: approx. 150
- Type: Performing arts center

Construction
- Opened: May 2002

Website
- clarkcenter.org

The Clark Center for the Performing Arts is a performing arts center in Arroyo Grande, California, on the campus of Arroyo Grande High School. It opened in May 2002 and contains two theaters: Forbes Hall, with 616 seats, and the Studio Theatre, with 120 seats. The building is owned by the Lucia Mar Unified School District and is used for school productions, community productions, and a season of touring professional performances.

== History ==
The center originated with Clifford and Mary Lee Clark, residents of the Five Cities area. According to Clifford Clark's obituary, the couple attended a performance in the Arroyo Grande High School gymnasium in the early 1970s and concluded that the school needed a proper auditorium. They spent about 25 years raising funds for the project. The facility opened in May 2002 and was later named for the Clarks.

By its fifth anniversary in 2007, the center was operated jointly by the Lucia Mar Unified School District, a foundation, and a nonprofit association. It hosted about 180 events in 2006, with roughly 150 volunteers contributing some 11,000 hours a year.

An annex on the west side of the building, part of the original plans but deferred for lack of funding, was completed in 2009 at a cost of about $2 million raised from donors. It added a green room, a workshop, storage, two dressing rooms, and office space. Clifford Clark cut the ribbon at its opening.

The center's school matinee program, Arts in Education, was suspended in March 2020 during the COVID-19 pandemic and relaunched in March 2024.

Ken Dalebout has served as interim executive director since September 2026, while the board of directors conducts a search for a permanent executive director.

== Facilities ==
Forbes Hall is the main auditorium. The smaller Studio Theatre is a black box theater. The 2009 annex houses a green room, workshop, storage, dressing rooms, and offices.

== Programming ==
The center presents a season of touring artists each year, announced at a public event in early summer, and hosts productions by Arroyo Grande High School and community groups. Its Arts in Education program brings students from local schools to daytime performances.
