= 2-step (breakdance move) =

Footwork sequence in breakdance

Demonstration of a 2-step

The 2-step, also known as Mini Swipe or Baby Swipe, is a footwork sequence in breakdance.

== Description ==
The 2-step is a fundamental dance move that is often one of the first footwork sequence learned by breakdancers. Many breakdance moves can begin from the 2-step position. This move sets up the direction of movement and builds up momentum when dancing. This move allows the dancer to stay low and in contact with the ground, which places them in an optimal position for performing other dance moves. This move is often launched from the third step of the basic 6-step and involves the dancer hopping with a crouched leg over the other straightened leg while simultaneously rotating the dancer's body over the swinging leg in a twisting movement similar to a swipe. The move leaves the dancer in a position similar to the fourth step of the 6-step, but facing 180 degrees in the opposite direction. When dancing 2-step is often used as a move by itself or as a transition into other moves such as powermoves, freezes, toprock and much more.

== Step-by-step ==
This description is for clockwise rotation. As the name implies, there are a total of two steps in this dance move. A standard version begins in a push up position.

1. From the push up position, kick your right leg to the left side as if you were going to a 3-step position.
2. Pull your right leg back so that your legs make a v-shape. This should look like step 3 of a 6-step.
3. From that position straighten your left leg and sweep it around your right, when it passes in front of your body shift your weight from your right hand to your left hand.
4. Without stopping after step 3 lower your right hand and use your right leg to force your body upwards into the air, while you are in the air shift your weight onto your right hand while twisting your torso. Extend your right leg forward and you should land at 180 degrees of your previous position.

Once you have these steps down you should combine steps two and three and do the moves simultaneously.

== Variants ==
The 2-step is a move based on the 6-step. The 2-step can be down on the knuckles of the hand as well as the palm.
