= Anna Sokolow =

American dance artist (1910–2000)

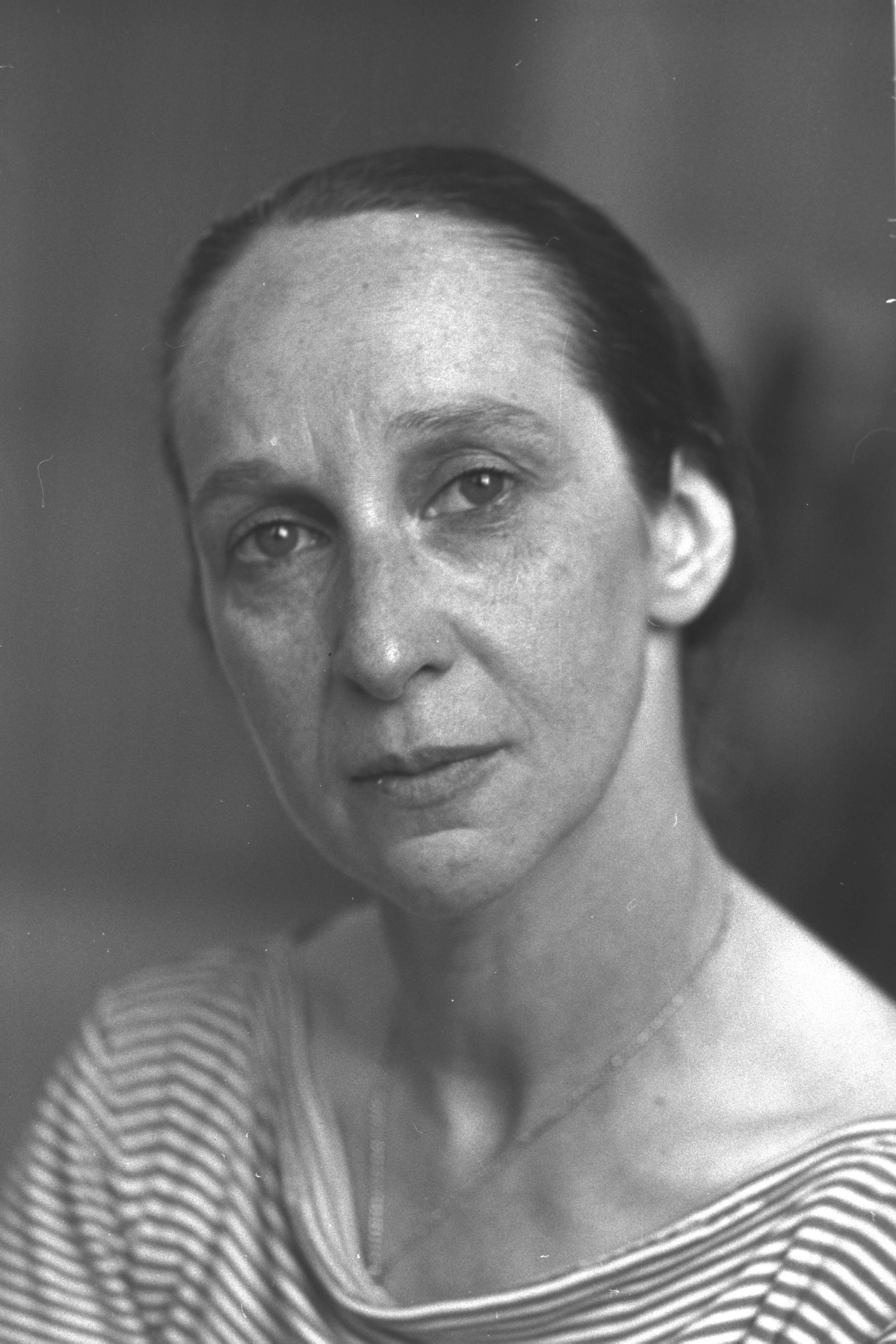
- Anna Sokolow, 1961
- Born: February 9, 1910; Hartford, Connecticut
- Died: March 29, 2000 (aged 90); Manhattan, New York City
- Occupations: modern dancer and choreographer

Anna Sokolow (February 9, 1910 – March 29, 2000) was an American dancer and choreographer. Sokolow's work is known for its social justice focus and theatricality. Throughout her career, Sokolow supported the development of modern dance around the world, including in Mexico and Israel.

At the beginning of her career, Sokolow was a principal dancer in the Martha Graham Company. Sokolow soon became an independent choreographer, who went on to form multiple dance companies throughout her life.

Sokolow choreographed for and set her work on companies around the world, including major companies such as Batsheva Dance Company, Alvin Ailey American Dance Theater, The Jose Limón Dance Company, Joffery Ballet and the Daniel Lewis Dance Company. Her work continues to be performed by the Sokolow Theatre/Dance Ensemble in New York City.

Her work is preserved and set by the Sokolow Theatre/Dance Ensemble and the Sokolow Dance Foundation in Massachusetts.

== Early life ==
Anna Sokolow was born on February 9, 1910, in Hartford, Connecticut, and grew up on the Lower East Side of Manhattan. Both of her parents were Jewish immigrants from Russia.

Her father, Samuel Sokolow, immigrated to the U.S. around 1905 followed in 1907 by her mother Sarah. Intending to reside in Hartford, Connecticut, Samuel and Sarah eventually moved to New York City for better job prospects. Sarah started working in the garment industry when Samuel became disabled by Parkinson's disease. A socialist, Sarah was heavily involved in the Garment Workers Union. Anna Sokolow was the third child of four born to Samuel and Sarah, preceded by Isadore and Rose, and succeeded by Gertie.

== Training ==
Sokolow began her dance training by taking classes at the Emanuel Sisterhood alongside her sister Rose. Her first teacher, Elsa Pohl, was influenced by the work of Isadora Duncan. Despite the objection of her family, Sokolow moved away from home and dropped out of school in favor of a dance career at age 15. While training, Sokolow supported herself by working in a factory. She began training under Irene Lewisohn, Louis Horst, and Martha Graham, among others, at the Neighborhood Playhouse at the Henry Street Settlement in 1925 as a “Junior Player.” Blanche Talmud, Sokolow's main teacher, had a background in Delsarte and Dalcroze eurhythmics.

As a student at the Playhouse, Sokolow studied voice, dance and pantomime. She eventually received a full scholarship at the Playhouse, and participated in her first major performance in 1928 as a part of Ernest Bloch's “Israel Symphony.”

== Career ==
Sokolow first performed with the Martha Graham Company in 1930. She danced with the company as a soloist for about 8 years. While performing with the Graham company, she assisted Louis Horst in his choreography classes. One of her notable performances with the company was in Massine's “Rite of Spring” in 1930.

Alongside her work with the Martha Graham Company, Sokolow began choreographing and offering solo performances in 1932. She developed the Theatre Union Dance Group in 1933, which was renamed “Dance Unit” in 1935.

In programs for “Dance Unit”, Anna Sokolow's name wasn't emphasized in order to bring more attention to the group as opposed to certain individuals. In 1936, a full evening of her own work was presented at the Young Men's Hebrew Association (YMHA) in New York City. Some of the works included in the program were Speaker (1935), Strange American Funeral (1935), Inquisition ‘36 (1936), and Four Little Salon Pieces (1936). In 1937, four men joined the Dance Unit for the first time, premiering in Excerpts from a War Poem (1937). With the addition of men, Sokolow avoided dividing movement based on gender and instead presented all bodies as equals.

Beginning in the 1930s, she affiliated herself with the politicized "radical dance" movement, out of which developed her work Anti-War Trilogy (1933). During this time period, she performed and choreographed both solo and ensemble works, which tackled subject matter that included the exploitation of workers and growing troubles of Jews in Germany. Sokolow drew inspiration from the Union movement, and stated in a 1975 interview that she considered the unions her first audience. She often explored themes of Communism, socialism, and the working class through her dances, particularly in Strange American Funeral (1935) and Case No. -- (1937). Several works from this period, including Anti-War Trilogy, were set to music by the composer Alex North.

In the 1940s, Sokolow continued premiering works in various venues throughout New York City, such as The Bride (1946), a piece influenced by traditional elements from Orthodox Jewish wedding ceremonies. From 1955 to 1985, Sokolow regularly choreographed for the Juilliard Dance Ensemble at the Juilliard School. She created many notable pieces for the group including Primavera (1955) and Ballade (1965).

In 1953, Sokolow created Lyric Suite, one of her most well-received works. A collection of solos, duets, and ensemble work set to the music of Alban Berg, Lyric Suite was noteworthy for its lack of a narrative and its "suite form" design. The New Dance Group sponsored the first showing of Lyric Suite in March 1954. Sokolow considered this piece as the beginning of a new era in her choreography.

Another of Sokolow's signature works is Rooms (1955), a piece that explores loneliness. The music is a Jazz score, composed for the dance by Kenyon Hopkins. Rooms is divided into six sections: Dream, Escape, Desire, Panic, Daydream, and The End? The piece features eight dancers and eight chairs, with the intention that each dancer and chair portrays a character in a secluded room.

From 1958 to 1965, Sokolow created her Opus series. This series includes Opus '58 (1958), Opus Jazz 1958 (1958), Opus '60 (1960), Opus '62 (1962), Opus '63 (1963), and Opus '65 (1965). The set of six pieces, along with Session for Six (1958) and Session for Eight (1959) used similar movement vocabularies and content with slight variations in each. Labanotation scores show the similarities, including the use of strong accents and the dropping of the body and its parts to the floor, which created a jaded, teenage mood. To accompany this mood, costumes for the Opus pieces were simple, consisting of leotards, t-shirts, and tights. In some performances of the Opus series, the performance was given on a bare stage, with no curtains, against the bare brick walls of the theater.

In the later 1960s, Sokolow used jazz style to protest the war occurring in Vietnam and to give voice to the countercultures of America. Time+ (1966) was a war protest dance with multiple parts. In the piece, Sokolow used clear imagery of soldiers and their experiences of war. The piece ended with soldiers that appear to be wounded and struggling with one another to stand, showing the great hardships that come from war.

In the 1970s and 80s, Sokolow's artistic focus turned to the great painters, writers and composers of the late 19th and early 20th centuries. Her dances of this period include Magritte, Magritte in 1970, Scenes from the Music of Charles Ives in 1971, Homenaje a Federico García Lorca in 1973, Homage to Alexander Scriabin in 1977, Poe in 1977 (revised and renamed Homage to Edgar Allan Poe in 1985), and Kurt Weill in 1988. Sokolow also returned to the theme in one of her last pieces, Frida, in 1997.

After Sokolow's death in 2000, The Player's Project continued until 2004. After that point, the company's former co-artistic directors, Jim May and Lorry May, formed separate institutions to maintain Sokolow's repertory and legacy.

The Sokolow Theatre/Dance Ensemble, founded by Jim May, performs Sokolow's repertory plus contemporary choreographies under the direction of Artistic Director Samantha Géracht and co-artistic directors Lauren Naslund and Eleanor Bunker. The Sokolow Theatre/Dance Ensemble continues to perform, set and reconstruct Sokolow's work today.

The Sokolow Dance Foundation, directed by Lorry May, offers unique educational programs and actively licenses and reconstructs Sokolow's works.

=== Theater work ===
Sokolow began her association with Broadway in 1947, choreographing for the musical Street Scene. She choreographed for multiple Broadway productions, including Happy as Larry (1950) and Camino Real (1953).

She worked as the choreographer during the rehearsal process for the first production of the musical Hair (1967), but left the production before its first performance and her contributions were not credited. Sokolow also frequently staged works for the New York City Opera, including multiple productions in their 1956 season.

Sokolow choreographed dances for The California Story at San Diego's Fiesta del Pacifico in 1957.

=== International work ===
Though based in New York City, Sokolow was known for her work abroad as well. In 1939, she traveled to Mexico with her company to perform at the Bellas Artes (School of Fine Arts) in Mexico City, where they received positive reviews. This success led to the formation of the group, La Paloma Azul. Sokolow created four works for this company El Renacuajo Paseador (1940). After her dancers left to return to New York City, Sokolow chose to stay behind to continue working at the request of the Ministry of Public Education. La Paloma Azul dissolved in 1940 due to the emergence of a competitor dance group. She eventually returned to New York City in the early 1940s but continued to visit Mexico City occasionally throughout her career.

Jerome Robbins encouraged Sokolow to go to Israel to work with the Inbal Dance Theatre in 1953. Sokolow's visits to Israel began in the 1950s and concluded in the 1980s. Her first program to premiere in Israel featured The Treasure (1962), The Soldier's Tale (1954), and Dreams (1961). In 1962, she helped established Israel's Lyric Theatre. The company was short-lived as they disbanded in 1964. Sokolow returned to Israel as a guest choreographer for Batsheva Dance Company in 1972.

== Teaching ==
One of Anna Sokolow's earliest teaching experiences occurred during a trip to Russia in the early 1930s. While there with her then-lover and musical collaborator, Alex North, she taught classes in the Graham technique. In 1955, Sokolow taught her first classes at Juilliard. She officially joined the faculty in 1958 and taught classes in "method dancing" from 1958 to 1993. Sokolow also worked alongside Robert Lewis as a teacher at the Repertory Theater at Lincoln Center and the HB Studio. Additionally, she taught choreography classes at the Hebrew Arts School later in her career.

=== The Actors Studio ===
In 1947, Sokolow's close friend Elia Kazan convinced her to become a founding member of The Actors Studio. Sokolow taught movement for actors. The classes were rooted in the Graham technique and also incorporated floor work and ballet barre elements. Her piece Rooms (1955) emerged as a response to her experiences working with groups of aspiring actors. Sokolow eventually set a small-scale production—Elmer and Lilly—on her students. Sokolow left The Actors Studio in the mid-1950s.

== Repertory ==
Although much of Sokolow's work was not filmed, some pieces may be seen at the New York Public Library in its Dance Division. Here follows a list of many of her pieces of choreography along with premiere date and premiering company (when known).

- Anti War Trilogy (1933 – Theatre Union Dance Group)
- Histrionics (1933)
- Speaker (1935)
- Strange American Funeral (1935 – Dance Unit of the New Dance League)
- Inquisition ‘36 (1936 )
- Four Little Salon Pieces (1936)
- Ballad (In a Popular Style) 1936
- Case No.-- (1937)
- Excerpts From a War Poem (F.T. Marinetti) (1937)
- Slaughter of the Innocents (1937)
- Songs of a Semite (1937)
- “Filibuster” from The Bourbons Got the Blues (1938)
- Dance of All Nations, Lenin Memorial Meeting (1938)
- Sing for Your Supper (1939)
- The Exile (A Dance Poem) (1939 – Dance Unit)
- Don Lindo de Almería (1940 – Grupo de Danzas Clasicas y Modernas)
- El Renacuajo Paseador (1940 – La Paloma Azul)
- Lament for the Death of a Bullfighter (1941)
- Kaddish (1945)
- The Bride (1946)
- Mexican Retablo (1946)
- Images from the Old Testament (1946)
- Lyric Suite (1953)
- Histoire de Soldat (1954)
- Rooms (1955)
- Poem (1956 – Theatre Dance Company)
- Session for Six (1958 – Anna Sokolow Dance Company)
- Opus Jazz 1958 (1958 – The Israel National Opera)
- Opus '58 (1958)
- Opus ‘60 (1960 – Ballet de Bellas Artes)
- Dreams (1961 – Anna Sokolow Dance Company)
- Opus ‘62 (1962- Lyric Theatre)
- Opus ‘63 (1963 – Juilliard Dance Ensemble)
- Forms (1964 – Anna Sokolow Dance Company)
- Opus ‘65 (1965 – Apprentices and Scholarship Students of the Robert Joffrey Ballet)
- Odes (1965)
- Ballade (1965 – Juilliard Dance Ensemble)
- Time+ (1966)
- Deserts (1967 – Anna Sokolow Dance Company)
- Hair: The American Tribal Love-Rock Musical (1967)
- Steps of Silence (1968 – Repertory Dance Theatre)
- Magritte, Magritte (1970 – Lyric Theatre)
- Scenes from the Music of Charles Ives (1971 – Juilliard Dance Ensemble)
- A Short Lecture and Demonstration on the Evolution of Ragtime as Presented by Jelly Roll Morton (1971 – Players' Project)
- Three Poems (1973 – Juilliard Dance Ensemble)
- Homenaje a Federico Garcia Lorca (1973 – Ballet Independiente)
- In Memory of No. 52436 (1973 – Batsheva Dance Company)
- Ride the Culture Loop (1975 – Juilliard Dance Ensemble)
- Moods (1975 – Contemporary Dance System)
- The Song of Songs (1976 - Inbal)
- Ellis Island (1976 – Juilliard Dance Ensemble)
- Homage to Alexander Scriabin (1977 – Contemporary Dance System)
- For Langston (1980 – Rod Rodgers Dance Company)
- Preludes (1981 – Repertory West Dance Company)
- Song of Deborah (1981 – New Players’ Project)
- From the Diaries of Franz Kafka (1981 – New Players’ Project)
- Nocturne (1982 – H.T. Dance Company)
- Elegy (1982 – Mary Anthony Dance Theatre)
- Les Noces (1982 – Batsheva Dance Company)
- As I remember (1984 – Daniel Lewis Dance Repertory Company)
- Homenaje a David Alfaro Siqueiros (1984)
- Homage to John Field (1984 – Dublin City Ballet)
- Preludes (1984 – Players' Project)
- Homage to Poe (1986/1993 – Players' Project)
- Kurt Weill (1988 – Players’ Project)
- Poems (1988 – Jose Limon Dance Company)
- Poem (1995)
- Four Songs (1995)
- Frida (1997)
- Los Conversos [The Converts] (1981)

== Work for Broadway ==
- Noah (1935) - play with music by Louis Horst - co-choreographer
- Sing for Your Supper (1939) - revue - co-choreographer
- Street Scene (1947) - musical - choreographer
- The Great Campaign (1947) - play - choreographer
- Sleepy Hollow (1948) - musical - choreographer
- Regina (1949) - opera - choreographer
- Happy as Larry (1950) - musical - choreographer
- Camino Real (1953) - play - directing assistant
- Red Roses for Me (1955) - play - choreographer - Tony Nomination for Best Choreography
- Candide (1956) - operetta - choreographer
- Copper and Brass (1957) - musical - choreographer
- Clothes for a Summer Hotel (1980) - dance consultant

== Legacy ==
Nicknamed modern dance's "rebellious spirit", Sokolow won a variety of awards including the Samuel Scripps Award (1991), Aztec Eagle Honor (1988), an Honorary Doctor of Fine Arts from Boston Conservatory (1988), and an Honorary Doctor of Humanities from the Ohio State University (1978). In 1967, she received a prestigious grant from the National Council on the Arts, worth $10,000; Sokolow used this funding to create Deserts (1967).

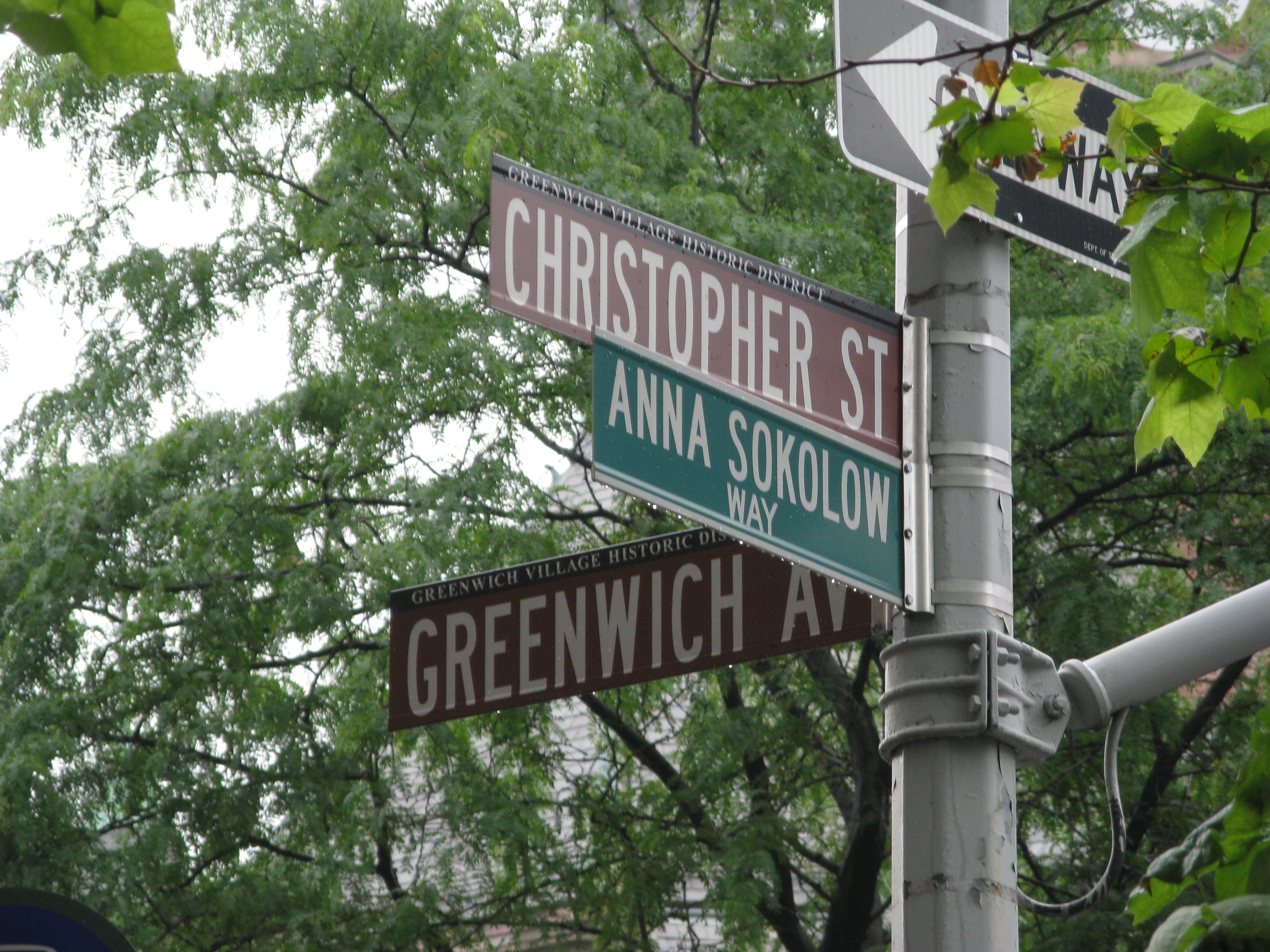
Anna Sokolow Way, ceremonially renamed for Sokolow three years after her death

Sokolow was inducted into the Mr. & Mrs. Cornelius Vanderbilt Whitney Hall of Fame in 1998, and the American Academy of Arts and Letters in 1993. Sokolow dedicated her works to her inspirations including Isadora Duncan, Louis Horst, Anne Frank, José Limón, Vaslav Nijinsky, Martin Luther King Jr., and her parents. Her choreography continues to be performed by the Sokolow/Theatre Dance Ensemble and by dance companies and schools around the world.

One block of Christopher Street in New York City's Greenwich Village bears the honorary name of "Anna Sokolow Way," in recognition of her longtime residence at 1 Christopher St.

== Personal life ==
Sokolow was romantically involved with Alex North, her musical collaborator, for seven years. Despite the dissolution of their relationship, they continued to work together throughout their careers. She had no children.

Sokolow was known for her heavy involvement in the Communist movement. In New York's 1936 election, she registered as a Communist. In the 1940s, she was also a featured performer in many Communist rallies. However, by the 1950s, she no longer aligned herself with the Communist party. When questioned by the FBI, she cited her participation at rallies was motivated by earning money for her performance.

Sokolow suffered from depression in the late 1960s and early 1970s.

Sokolow died at the age of 90, on March 29, 2000, in New York City.
