= Swipe (breakdancing move) =

Breakdance powermove

The Swipe is one of the most recognizable power moves in b-boying. The b-boy or b-girl leans back, whips their arms to one side to touch the ground, and their legs follow closely behind, twisting 360 degrees to land on the ground once again. An example is the swipe performed by the character Samir in the movie Office Space.

== Variants ==
Normal swipes begin from the crab position, or they may be Air Swipes in which the b-boy jumps back directly from a standing position into a swipe, sometimes ending up in standing position once again. (The Air Swipe is described in the opening sentence and the step-by-step section). Regardless of the beginning, there are several swipe variations that basically differ in terms of which parts of the arms hit the ground.

- X – swipes – Swipes with legs crossed
- Baby Swipe – Essentially a footwork move, often launched from the 6-step, that employs a twist of the hips similar to the swipe.
- Elbow Swipe – Elbows replace the hands.
- Forearm Swipe – Forearms replace the hands.
- Head Swipe – Head replaces the hands.
- Master Swipe – Both hands leave the ground at the same time, and both legs lift simultaneously as well.
- Superman Swipe – An exaggerated Swipe that is very open and more powerful-looking. The hands should be placed further apart.
- Flight Swipe – Only one hand, usually the hand on the outside of the rotation (i.e. if swiping to the left, use the right hand). B-Boy Morris is famous for using this move.
- One-Footed Swipe – One leg in the air, often pointed straight out, usually the leg on the inside of the rotation.
- DOHC (Dual Over-head Cam) Air Swipe – Similar to the baby swipe. It utilizes the momentum and the torque gain from the air flare. Both legs are held tightly together to increase rotational speed.
