= Floor-Barre =

Ballet training technique

Floor-barre is a technique in ballet training that "takes the basic ballet barre training from the standing position to the floor, "taking the effort of standing out of the equation."

Zena Rommett originated Floor Barre in the 1960s in New York City one day in class, when she found herself telling the students at the ballet barre to "just lie down on the floor and start all over again." Zena Rommett spent her lifetime further refining and passing on her technique until her death at 89 in New York City. Floor-Barre, a registered trademark for the exclusive use of Zena Rommett and her legally certified Zena Rommett Floor-Barre teachers, strengthens the body, and enhance the working of ballet dancers. The name of the technique as first used in English by Zena Rommett states its essence, which takes the basic ballet barre training from the standing position to the floor, "taking the effort of standing out of the equation". Since 1998 Zena Rommett Floor-Barre Foundation holds August Certification/Renewal conferences at City Center of New York City, where teachers of Zena Rommett Floor-Barre are certified and re-certified so that the technique will continue to progress instead of fossilizing. Summer conferences in Italy According to Rommett, the technique allows the trainees to enhance their precision and posture, making fixes that remain in their muscle memory and become evident as they go back to train in standing position. Rommett also claims that by training in this technique certain typical dancer injuries can be prevented.

== Background ==
The term floor barre is used for several floor-based ballet conditioning approaches; Boris Knyazev is credited with inventing barre au sol in ballet pedagogy, while Zena Rommett later developed a distinct technique she called “Floor-Barre”, performed lying on the floor using traditional barre-style exercises.

The practice known as Barre au sol (barre on the floor) is commonly attributed to Russian-born ballet dancer and pedagogue Boris Knyazev. Dance technique sources describe the method as originating in the mid-20th century, when Kniaseff adapted traditional ballet barre exercises for performance on the floor due to the absence of installed wall barres in his studio. The resulting system emphasized alignment, muscular control, and technical precision without weight-bearing, and later became widely adopted in ballet training.

== Benefits ==
The primary benefit of floor barre is that it causes less strain on the hip joints. Often, when a dancer is standing at the barre, their turnout is forced beyond the individual’s range of motion. This means that the dancers are using gravity and their weight to forcibly turn their legs out in an attempt to reach that ‘ideal’ 180 degree turnout. This is not natural and can be quite dangerous for the joints. Floor barre emphasizes the importance in utilizing natural turnout by allowing movement that is both gravity resisted and assisted.

Floor barre is also recommended for dancers recovering from injury because it enforces neutral spine, which corrects improper posture, and is not too strenuous for the recovering body. As a dance specific rehabilitation, it rebuilds strength and natural mobility. Exercises in floor barre can specifically target certain parts of the body such as the psoas muscles, hamstrings, or pelvis while still allowing the dancer to focus on increasing center awareness.

Dancers who over-rotate while utilizing their turnout can experience an overuse based syndrome known as Plantar Fasciitis. It is geared towards dancers and runners because of the constant heel rise to toe in their activities and exercises; it is caused by the excessive force used on that specific part of the foot, the plantar fascia. For dancers, it is most likely developed from a repetitive grandplié or relevé. If a dancer has this condition, it is unnecessary to stop dancing unless the case is severe. Modifications in the movement and overall correcting the issue is enough. It can resolve within several months and it can be repelled with the proper practice.
