= Mr. Fresh and the Supreme Rockers =

Mr. Fresh and the Supreme Rockers were a breakdancing group known for their classic book, Breakdancing: Mr. Fresh and the Supreme Rockers Show You How, published in 1984. The book was a common introductory reference for newcomers to the "breakin'" style of dance as it evolved in North America in the 1970s and 1980s.

== See also ==
- Hip hop music
- Street dance
