= Floorwork =

Type of dance

In dance, floorwork refers to movements performed on the floor. Floorwork is used extensively in modern dance, particularly Graham technique, Hawkins technique, and breakdancing. Some dance training practices, notably Floor-Barre, consist entirely of floorwork.

Floorwork changes the body's relationship with gravity, and requires dancers to navigate between higher and lower levels ("going in and out of the floor"). These features are central to the use of floorwork in choreography, and also affect its role in technique classes. Executing floorwork smoothly requires flexible joints, a relaxed body, and attention to the kinesthetic feedback provided by the floor.

The "low" or floorwork level is one of three principal spatial levels dancers may occupy, along with the middle or bipedestrian (upright) and the high or aerial (jumping) levels.

== Concert dance ==
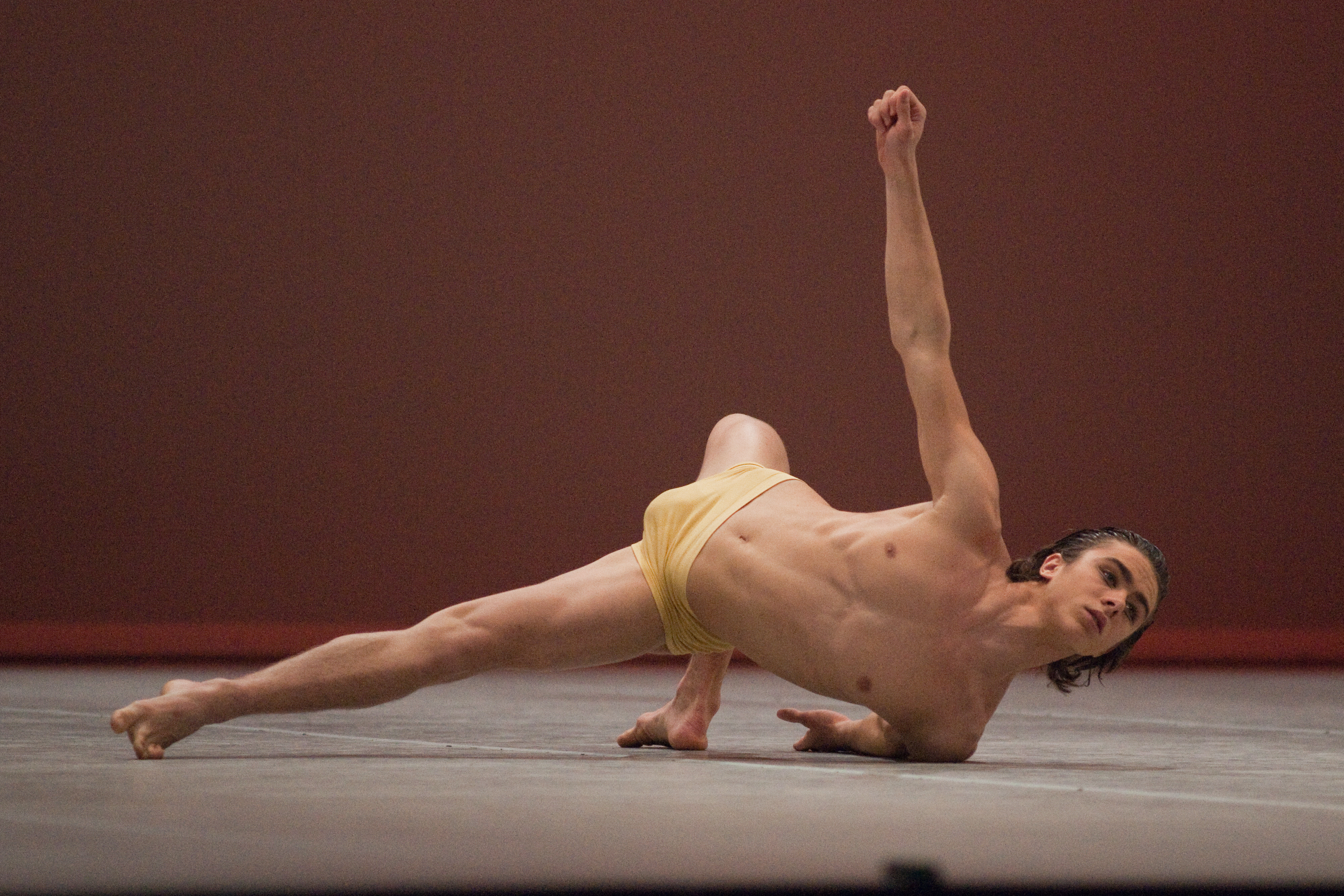
Floorwork in a contemporary ballet variation

The use of floorwork is one of the major differences between modern dance and previous Western concert dance genres. Isadora Duncan incorporated floorwork in dances as early as 1911, although credit for its introduction is more often given to her successor Martha Graham. The concept is closely associated with Graham technique, because of Graham's extensive use of floorwork and widely imitated innovations, as well as the technique's unique repertoire of falls. Doris Humphrey has been credited with floorwork innovations in a concert dance context.

Later movements derived from classical modern dance also used floorwork extensively. Contemporary ballet uses the floor as an integral part of the choreography, rather than the occasional kneel or collapse to be found in older romantic ballet styles. Floorwork is essential in the postmodern genre of contact improvisation, in which the floor can even be treated as a partner.

== B-boying ==
Stabbed windmills, a floor-based power move

Floorwork in b-boying (breakdancing) includes floor-based footwork, or downrock, as well as certain more athletic power moves. Downrock is performed with the body supported on the hands and feet. It allows the dancer to display their proficiency with foot speed and control by performing intricate footwork combinations. The foundational move of downrock is the 6-step, although innumerable variants exist. The hands, legs and knees may also be featured or support the body.

Downrock often leads to dramatic power moves, including floor-based moves such as windmills and flares.

Downrock became common in the mid-1970s. Keith and Kevin Smith, known as the "Nigga Twinz", have been credited with popularizing it, as has the original Rock Steady Crew. The emergence of floorwork was an important development in breaking, marking the end of the early "old-school" style.

== Belly dance ==
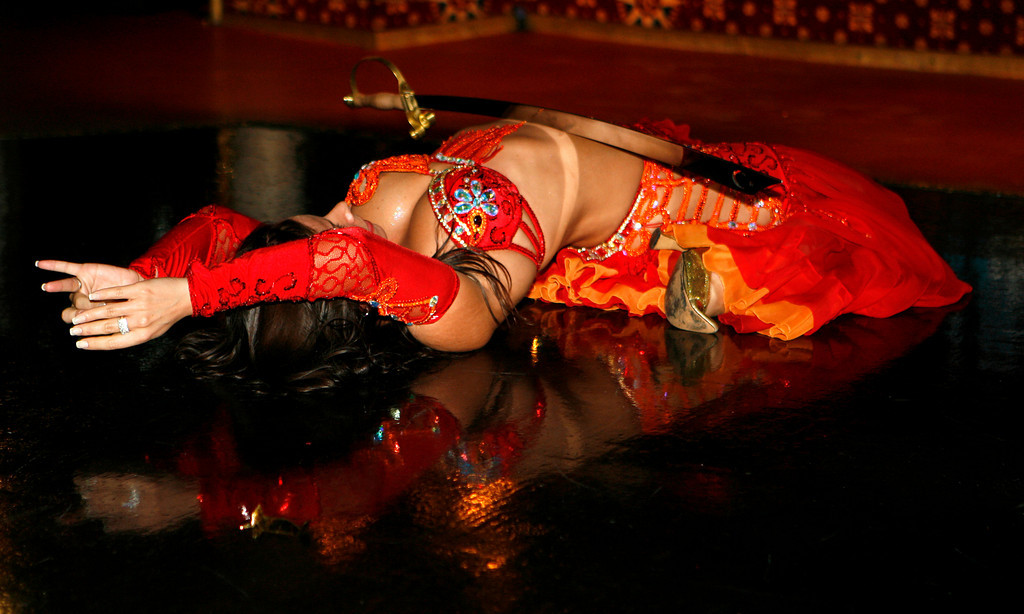
Belly dance floorwork, using a sword as a prop

Floorwork is a feature of many kinds of belly dance, often involving the manipulation of a prop while lying on the floor and intended to showcase the dancer's control. Masha Archer, as part of an effort to change what she saw as the over-sexualized and exploitative features of belly dance, rejected floorwork because she did not want audiences to look down on her dancers.

== Gallery ==
Further examples of floorwork

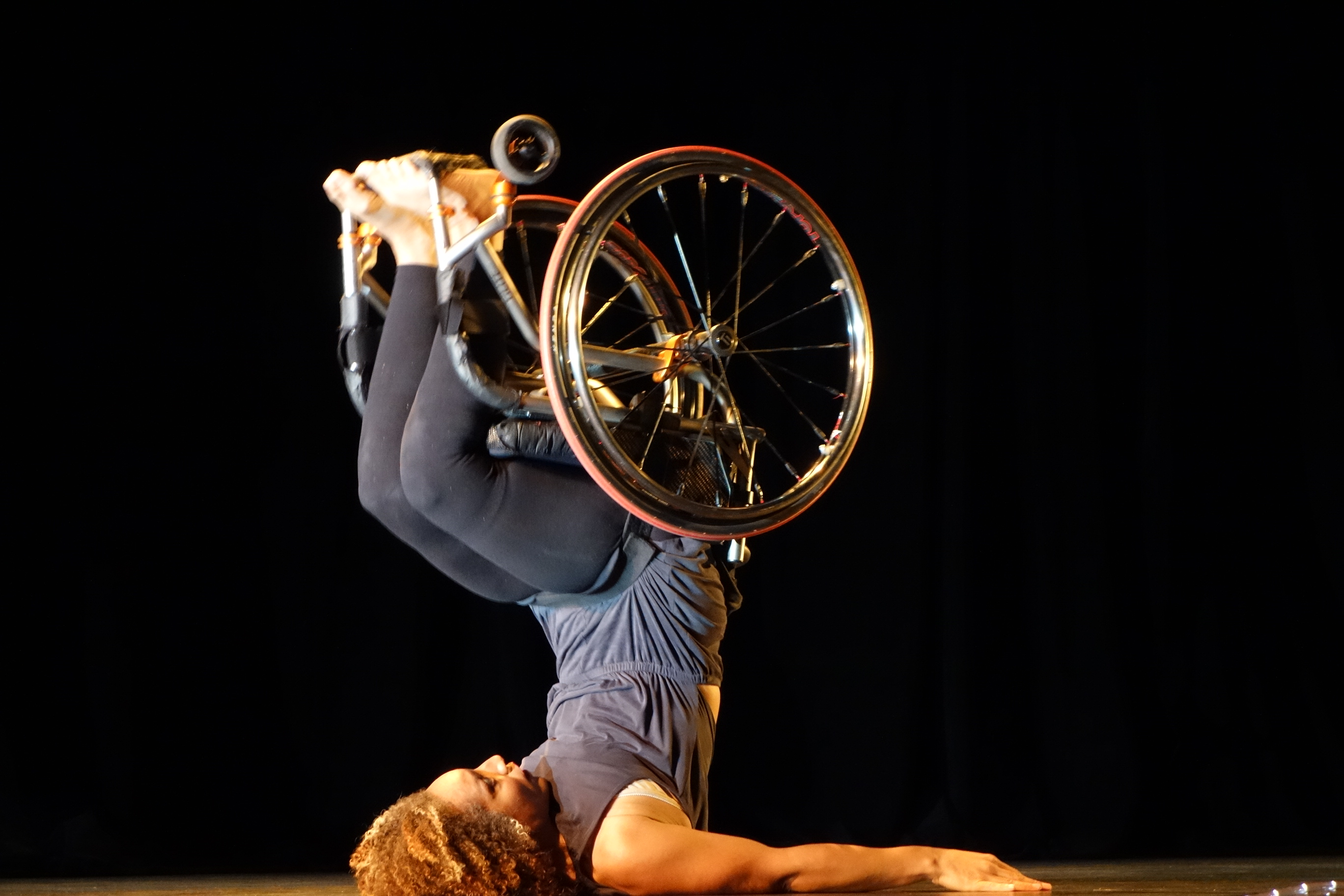
In a solo adaptive dance

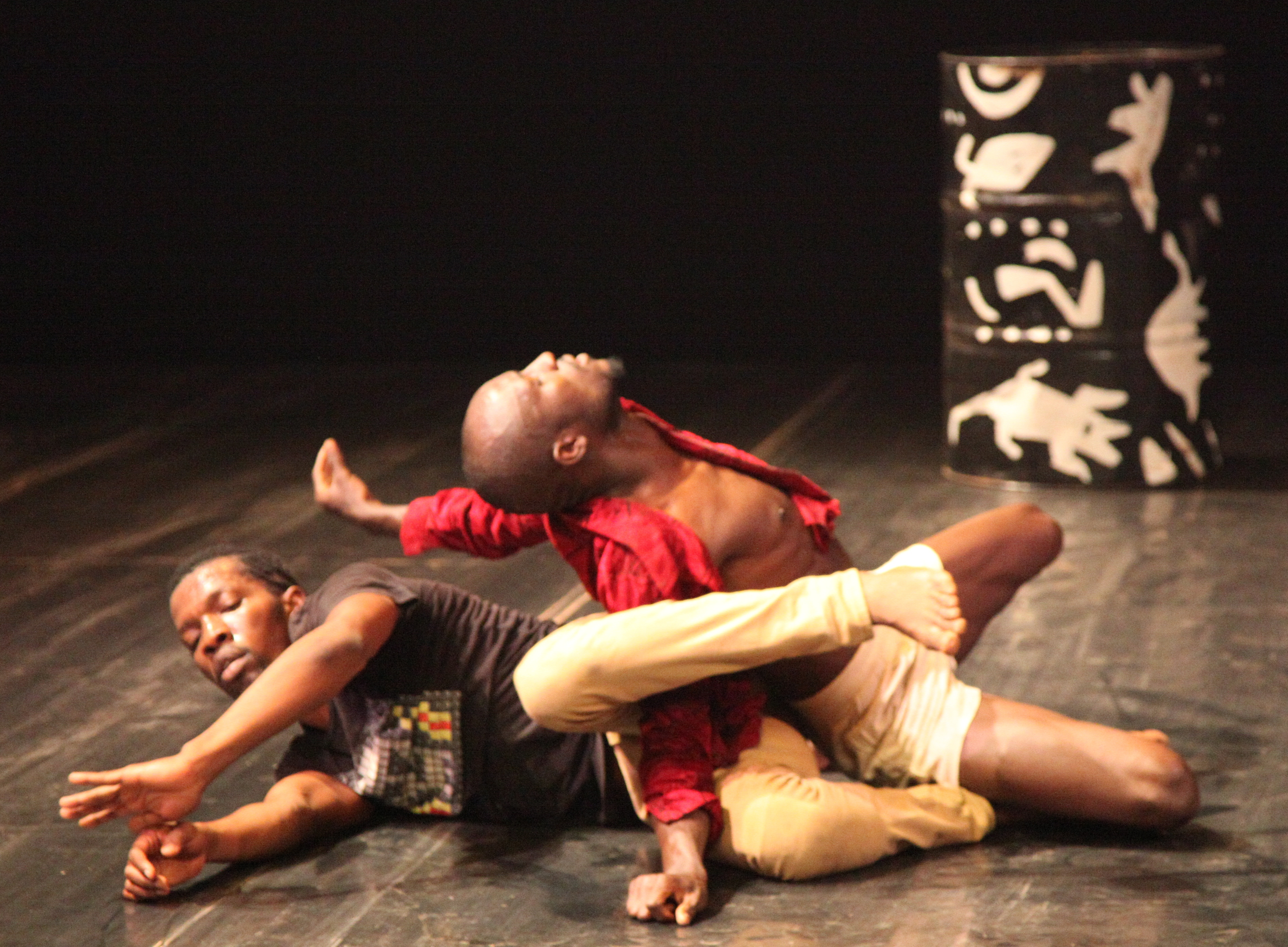
In a contemporary dance duet

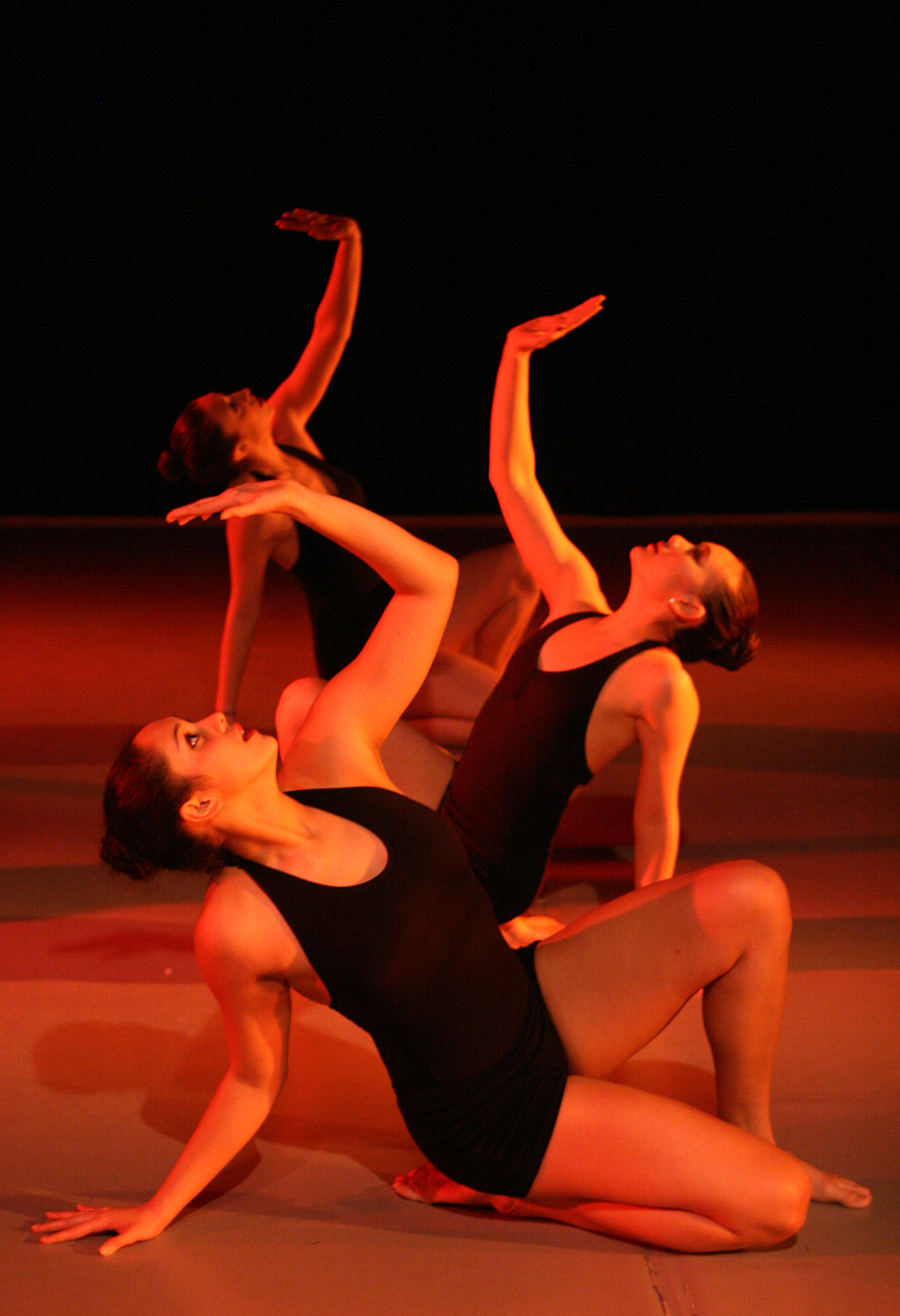
In a modern dance
