= Boris Kniaseff =

Russian ballet dancer and choreographer

- Борис Алексеевич Князев
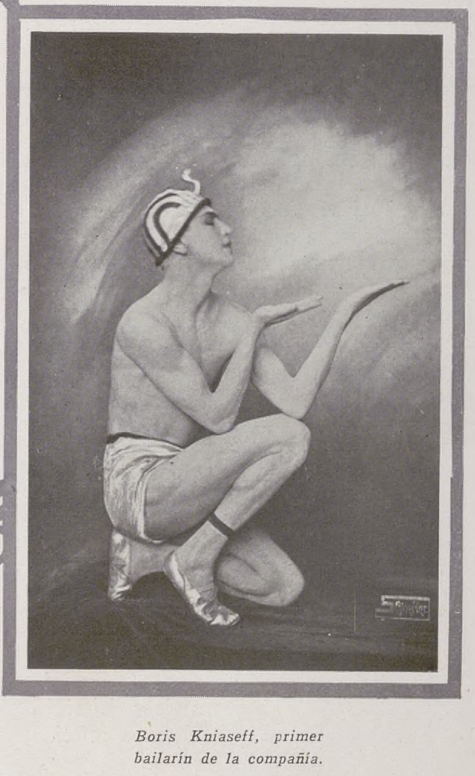
- Kniaseff in 1927
- Born: 1 July 1900; Saint Petersburg, Russian Empire
- Died: 7 October 1975 (aged 75); Paris, France
- Education: Ballet training in Moscow and Saint Petersburg
- Occupations: Ballet dancer, choreographer, ballet pedagogue
- Years active: c. 1916–1970s
- Known for: Inventor of Barre au sol (floor barre)
- Spouse(s): Olga Spesivtseva; Nina Vyroubova
- Children: Yura Kniaseff

Boris Kniaseff (Russian: Борис Князев; 1 July 1900 – 7 October 1975) was a Russian ballet dancer and choreographer.

Kniaseff is credited with originating Barre au sol (floor barre), a ballet training method in which traditional barre exercises are adapted for execution on the floor. According to multiple dance history and technique sources, Knyazev developed this approach in the mid-20th century after being unable to install fixed barres in his studio, prompting him to transpose classical warm-up exercises to a floor-based format.

== Biography ==
Boris Kniaseff was born on 1 July 1900 in Saint Petersburg, Russian Empire. He studied at the St. Petersburg Theater School from 1914 to 1917, class of Kasyan Goleizovsky and Mikhail Mordkin. He left Russia after The 1917 Revolution. At first he lived in Bulgaria, then in 1924 he moved to Paris. He was married to the ballerina Olga Spesivtseva. Together, they opened a ballet studio, but after some time they parted.

In 1937 he opened his own ballet school in Paris, and in 1953 one in Lausanne; he taught in Athens and Rome, and led the International Academy of Dance in Geneva.

Boris Knyazev taught many famous performers, including Zizi, Roland Petit, Yvette Chauvire and even Brigitte Bardot.

Boris Kniaseff's school is based on two assumptions: en dedans (socks and knees facing each other) and en dehors (deployed outside). Knyazev was the first who paid equal attention to these exercises. He enforced in his school the main rule - a daily exercise has to include and en dedans, and en dehors. He was a founder of ballet exercises on the floor - barre au sol.

One of his followers is Stella Voskovetskaya, a Vaganova Academy graduate, who took the best of Knyazev barre au sol, and incorporated it into the best and most advanced system of ballet training, the Vaganova system.

Stella Voskovetskaya founded the Classical Ballet School in Chicago where she works with pre-professional ballet dancers and rhythmic gymnasts.

Kniaseff died on 7 October 1975 in Paris, France.
