= Graham technique =

Style of modern dance

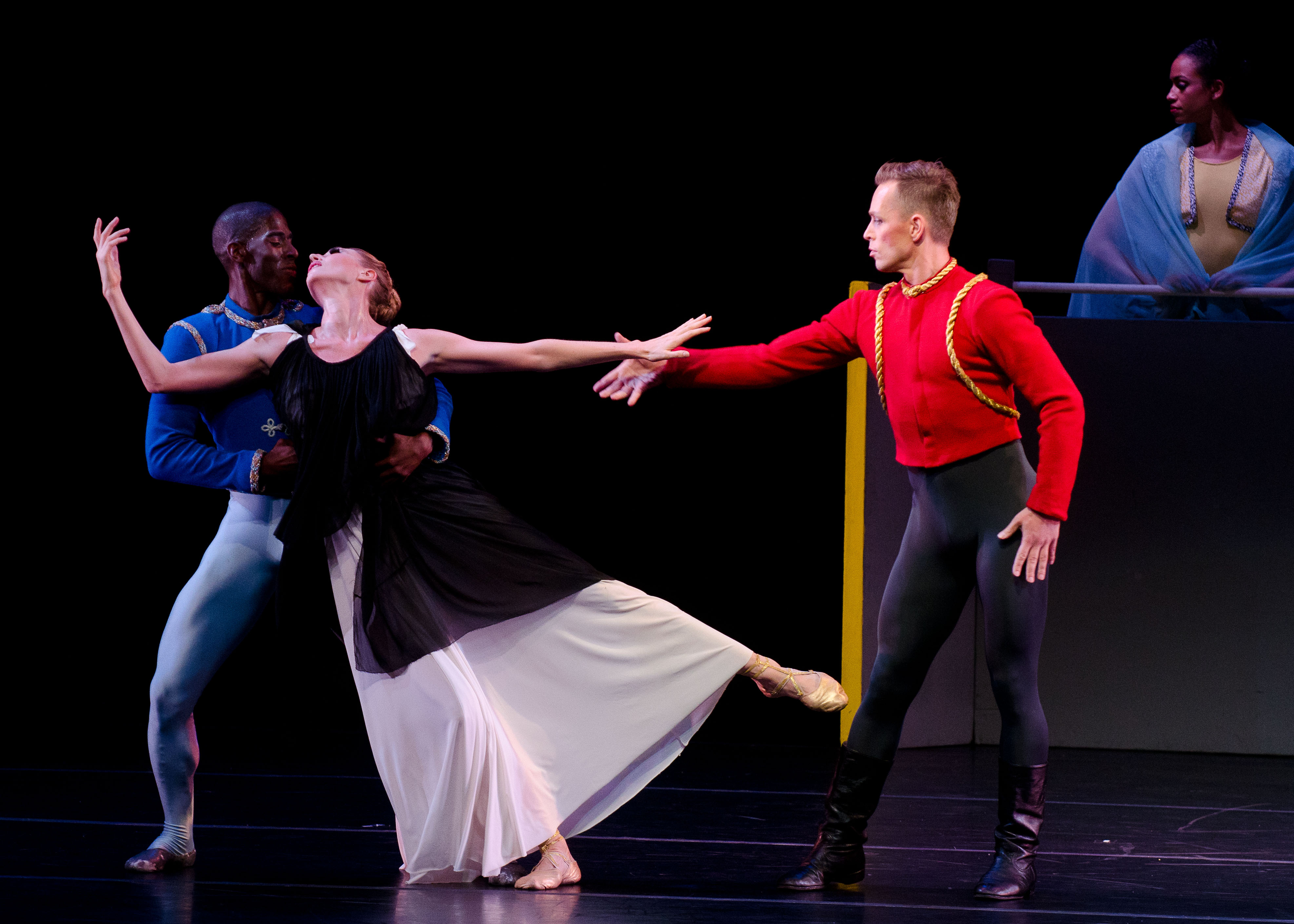
The Martha Graham Dance Company in performance. The central woman's pose shows the characteristic tension and theatricality of Graham technique.

Graham technique is a modern dance movement style and pedagogy created by American dancer and choreographer Martha Graham (1894–1991). Graham technique has been called the "cornerstone" of American modern dance, and has been taught worldwide. It is widely regarded as the first codified modern dance technique, and strongly influenced the later techniques of Merce Cunningham, Lester Horton, and Paul Taylor.

Graham technique is based on the opposition between "contraction and release", and the idea that movement starts in the torso, from breath, rather than from the feet. Its other dominant principle is the "spiraling" of the torso around the axis of the spine. Graham technique is known for its unique dramatic and expressive qualities and distinctive floorwork; dance critic Anna Kisselgoff described it as "powerful, dynamic, jagged and filled with tension".

The phrase "Graham technique" was registered as a trademark before Graham's death, and was the subject of a trademark dispute in the early 2000s.

== Characteristics ==
[W]heeling turns, off-center jumps, terrific falls, bodies spiralling to the floor and then surging upward again ...

— Joan Acocella, on Graham's "classic style"

Graham technique is based on "contraction and release", and uses different parts of the body in opposition to one another to create spirals for dramatic tension. It also incorporates formal exaggerations of "natural" movements.

=== Contraction and release ===
The fundamental movement of Graham technique is the cycle between "contraction" and subsequent "release", which developed as a stylized representation of breathing. Along with the "fall and recovery" dualism of Doris Humphrey's technique, it is one of the most important concepts in early modern dance.

Pull, pull on the contraction. Do not cave in. And the contraction is not a position. It is a movement into something. It is like a pebble thrown into the water, which makes rippling circles when it hits the water. The contraction moves.

— Martha Graham, 1991

A classic Graham contraction is a movement originating from the deep pelvic muscles. These muscles, along with the abdominal muscles, pull the spine into a concave arc from the coccyx to the nape of the neck, with the pelvis tucked and shoulders forward. The spine grows longer, not shorter, in a contraction. The force of the contraction can be used to move the body through space or change its trajectory. The release may be considered a relatively passive return to a "normal" state, or alternatively an equally active outward propulsion of energy. The contraction is associated with the exhale, and the release with the inhale, although this connection may be merely conceptual. The diaphragm moves, the torso changes shape, then the spine follows, then the limbs.

The indexical meaning of the contraction in Graham's choreography is generally that the dancer is overcome with emotion, although the details depend on the specific context.

Graham's decision to make movement originate from the core rather than distally echoes the style of Isadora Duncan, but Duncan wrote in her autobiography that movement originates in the solar plexus rather than the low abdomen.

=== Spiraling ===
The second fundamental concept in Graham technique is the spiral. The basic "spiraling" position consists of rotating the spine approximately 45° around its vertical axis, so that a dancer facing the front of the stage would have their shoulders aligned with the "Via Triumphalis", an imaginary line parallel to a corner-to-corner diagonal of the stage. In a "hip spiral", the movement initiates subtly from the hip and builds to maximum tension by pulling the opposing shoulder blade away from the initiating hip.

=== Falls ===
Falling is not a literal representation of reality, but instead an embodiment of inner experience; not a reductive language, but a poetic language that derives its meaning from the layering of the physical and psychic.

— Former Graham dancer Ellen Graff, 2004

Like other early modern choreographers, Graham used floorwork to explore the themes of weight and gravity in new ways; European students were "shocked" when Anna Sokolow introduced them to Graham's "percussive" falling techniques in the 1950s.

Graham falls use contractions and manipulate the body's center of gravity, in order to control the timing and direction of a fall. There is a wide range of strictly codified Graham falls, including sitting and traveling falls; falls from elevation; and standing falls, which may be directed forward, backward, to the side, or into a split. In almost all falls, the dancer exerts a strong upward force to counteract the force of gravity and suspend the body in space for artistic effect.

Graham falls can be used for dramatic effect, making meaning in a choreographic context from manipulating the balance between actively suspending the body and surrendering to gravity.

=== Other aspects ===
Graham technique uses the hands in distinctive ways. They are generally meant to be active and purposeful, not decorative. They are often held in a stylized, cupped position, with the fingers held straight and pulled towards the palm. Arms typically move in response to impetus from the back or shoulders. Arm movements were often left unspecified in Graham's early work, and there is variation between Graham teachers' use of port de bras (carriage of the arms).

== Analysis ==
Graham technique is designed to make its dancers expressive and dramatic. Its movement vocabulary draws connections between the physical and emotional meanings of "power", "control", and "vulnerability". Movement initiates from the core, incorporating large back movements and dancing on the floor. The technique highlights weight and effort; according to Marian Horosko, "the body had to appear to be pushing through a heavy mass, much like the pressure confronted when walking through water."

The technique's "earthbound" and "assertive" character initially drew strong criticism. In a "vehement" 1934 review, Lincoln Kirstein wrote: "Her jumps are jolts; her walks, limps and staggers; her runs, blind impulsive gallops; her bends, sways", and called the effect "stark, earth-ridden, gaunt, inward-eyed". In contrast, Graham was strongly promoted by dance critic John Martin, who helped her to win a popular following.

Graham was exceptionally flexible, and many of her technique's exaggerated movements can be difficult or painful to execute.

=== Relationship to ballet ===
Graham is considered a "codified technique", like the several schools of classical ballet. There are major differences between Graham and ballet techniques.

Graham dancers are trained to highlight their effort and use weight as a dramatic tool, while ballet dancers strive to appear weightless and effortless. Graham technique's use of large torso movements and floorwork represent further breaks from the balletic tradition. Graham explained that, although she respected the advances made in the course of ballet history, "Ballet ... did not say enough, especially when it came to intense drama, to passion." However, her extended collaboration with ballet-trained Erick Hawkins made her technique more balletic over time.

=== Gender ===
The technique was originally developed on an all-female company, although the company later included men. Graham sometimes criticized her dancers for failing to initiate from the pelvis, or as she sometimes put it, "move from the vagina"; the connection between Graham technique and the female pelvis led one of Graham's male dancers to develop "vagina envy". The pelvic origin of the contraction contributes to the role of sexuality in Graham technique.

Feminist dance scholar Dee Reynolds has argued that, because Graham technique was "so large and forceful, thrusting into and conquering space", it allowed Graham and her early all-female company to "redefine femininity as powerful and autonomous." Reynolds also noted that the idea of "moving from the vagina" is similar to late nineteenth-century ideas about "female hysteria", a supposed sexual disorder sometimes linked to dancing, and Graham's contractions could be seen as reclaiming the female body as an artistic medium.

== Influence on modern dance ==
Graham, along with Doris Humphrey, Helen Tamiris, Agnes de Mille, and others, was part of an artistic movement in dance which rejected both the centuries-old tradition of classical ballet and the first-generation rebels of modern dance, such as those who taught at the Denishawn school where Graham studied.

The expressive force of Graham technique had a revolutionary effect on modern dance. Graham is now taught in most university dance programs, and remains the "hallmark" style of contemporary concert dance; its movement vocabulary is familiar to almost all professional contemporary dancers. It strongly influenced several other codified techniques, notably those of Merce Cunningham, Lester Horton, and Paul Taylor.

== Teaching ==
Graham developed a daily class for her company, which is still used (with some variations) to teach her technique. The class is organized as follows:

- Floor work Students stand to salute the teacher as she or he enters, then work on the floor for thirty to forty minutes. Students begin with "bounces" of the torso in three seated positions, and perform contraction exercises and kneeling combinations. The floor exercises emphasize core strength and stability, explore the articulation of the spine and torso, and start to coordinate the arms, legs and head.
- Standing exercises The floorwork exercises transition up to standing combinations, which work the legs, feet, and torso, and train balance and control.
- Across the floor These traveling combinations begin with simple walking exercises, and increase in complexity to include jumps and leaping turns. Students traditionally consider this section an opportunity for "real" dancing, in contrast to the other sections' duly executed technical training.

== Trademark dispute ==
Martha Graham founded a school, the Martha Graham Center of Contemporary Dance, which she sold in 1956. After Graham's death, Ron Protas, her sole heir, sued the school for the rights to use Graham's trademarked name and choreography. A federal court awarded the school the rights to the names "Martha Graham" and "Graham technique" in 2001, and the rights to Graham's choreography in 2002.

== See also ==
- Modern dance
- Humphrey-Weidman technique
- Limón technique
