= 6-step =

Basic sequence of footwork

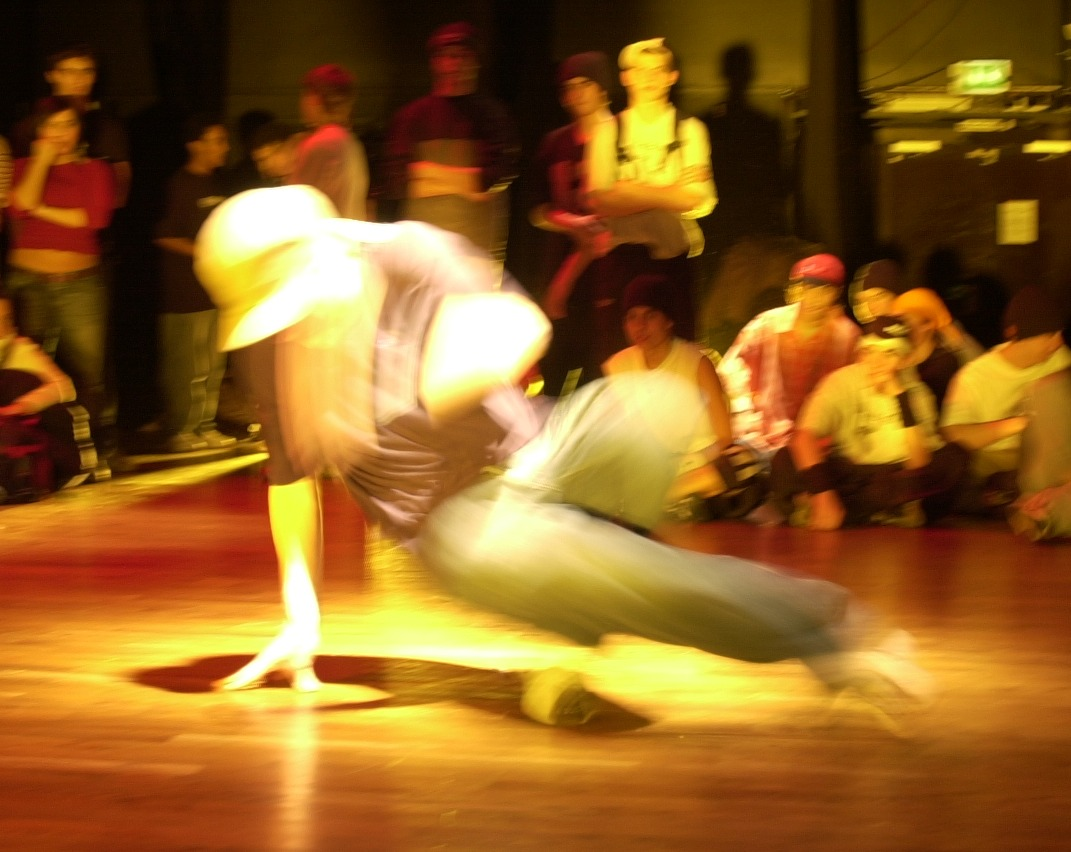
A 6-step.

The 6-step is one of the basic sequences of breakdancing footwork. The dancer uses their arms to support their body above the floor while moving their legs in a circle.

== Description ==
The 6-step.

The 6-step is foundational to b-boying not only because it is the first footwork sequence breakers often learn, but also because it is the move around which many sets, or routines, are structured. Many breaking moves can begin from the 6-step. The move sets up the direction of rotation and builds momentum while imparting body control, which, combined with the fact that the breaker stays low and in contact with the ground, places them in perfect position for performing other moves, from other footwork patterns to even some power moves. Steps 1/2 and 3/4 (described below) are most often used for launching other moves. Conversely, any move which ends on the ground can be transitioned smoothly back into the 6-step to continue a set.

The body position after step 2 and step 4 are mirror images of each other. The 6-step often involves looking straight ahead constantly and placing the feet in the same place for each rotation, but can be done with one’s body facing a different direction for each rotation.

While the basic 6-step resembles walking in a circle on the ground, there are many variations of footwork or "techs" that can reverse the direction of rotation, interlock limbs, incorporate minor flares, twists, powermoves, freezes, tweaks, and much more.

== Variants ==
Out of the many 6-step variations, a few have a defined, repeatable pattern like the 6-step itself and therefore are recognized as footwork sequences in their own right. The most widely recognized ones are listed below. Experimenting breakers commonly invent their own footwork sequences and casually refer to them as "their 9-step" or some similar term, but these sequences are not widely recognized. Moreover, some moves like the 2-step are relatively unrelated to the 6-step even though they have similar nomenclature.

=== 5-Step ===
A simplified variation of the 6-step. The only difference is that the initial two steps are merged into one. The dancer jumps into step two with his/her front leg slightly more extended.

=== 7-Step ===
Also a simple variation on the 6-step. The first step is the same, but at the second step the left leg steps over the right. From here the right leg is kicked forward to a position halfway through the third step of the 6-step. The right leg is tucked back in and you continue the fifth step.

=== Head Step ===
A 6-step variation wherein the breaker uses their head as a platform instead of his hands.
