= Zena Rommett =

Zena Rommett (born Angelina Buttignol; May 19, 1920 – November 10, 2010) was an Italian-born American dancer, teacher, and originator of the Zena Rommett Floor-Barre and Ballet Technique.

== Early life ==
Zena Rommett was born Angelina Buttignol on May 19, 1920, in the Veneto Region, Italy and immigrated to America with her mother in 1925. Zena's father, Antonio, had immigrated to America two years earlier. The family settled together in Elmsford, New York. Rommett studied ballet with leading ballet teachers in New York City, including Anatole Vilzak, Chester Hale, Ludmilla Schollar, and Elisabeth Anderson-Ivantzova.

== Professional dance career ==
Rommett began her professional career as a member of an adagio dance trio. She performed with the United Service Organizations (USO) during World War II. She made her Broadway debut in December 1944 in the original cast of Billy Rose's "Seven Lively Arts" with major ballet numbers choreographed by Anton Dolin. She danced in Broadway musicals "Song of Norway," choreographed by George Balanchine, and "Paint Your Wagon," choreographed by Agnes de Mille. Rommett's aspirations soon turned to pedagogy and she was invited by Robert Joffrey to teach at his American Ballet Center in New York City in 1965. Her combined teaching experience and professional dance background inspired her to create her unique Floor-Barre method for training and rehabilitating dancers.

== Dance school ==
In 1968, Zena Rommett Dance Association, aka Zena Rommett Floor-Barre Foundation, was founded by Rommett and founding board members Robert Joffrey and Howard Squadron, and Rommett founded her own school which was located at 70 West Third Street, in New York City. The school became Rommett's laboratory for developing the Floor-Barre, as she helped ballet, modern, jazz and musical theatre performers to overcome injuries and develop and refine their technique. Rommett discovered that working with the legs in a parallel position was an effective way to train and correct a dancer's placement. Rommett explained that "one day to experiment I had the students bring their legs into parallel. Then and there I discovered the beautiful secret of my technique. By working in parallel, I could correct the body alignment for a perfect turnout." Rommett later said that "when you work in parallel on the floor, the connection of the ankle to knee to hip is so correct that the leg remains aligned when you turn out again" and cautioned that "it must be done meticulously to be effective."

== Floor-Barre technique ==
Rommett conceived and developed her technique by bringing dancers away from a traditional ballet barre and onto the floor to do their dance training exercises. By taking the effort of standing out of the equation, Rommett's technique took the weight-bearing pressure off the ankles, knees, and hips. Rommett's application of ballet barre exercises performed using the floor as the source of support became known as the Floor-Barre, the first approach of its kind. Floor-Barre enables the practitioner to efficiently and effectively strengthen joints and muscles, correct alignment, release tension, and prevent and rehabilitate injuries. Known for her "patient, persuasive, and quiet voice," Rommett's quiet directed movements create a rhythmic flow which stills and focuses the mind and centers the body. This technique facilitates the development of beautiful lines, smooth transition and fluidity of movement. "What I do," said Rommett, "is define, refine, and fine-tune movements so that they can be performed more correctly and easily. The muscles become lengthened and strengthened, and energy is not dissipated but directed. It all comes from the basics taught in a pure manner." Rommett and her daughter, Camille Rommett, began offering annual teacher certification courses in 1998 and today her Floor-Barre Technique continues throughout the world by devoted teachers who have been certified to teach Rommett's technique. In 2006 Floor-Barre was trademarked. Camille Rommett continues Rommett's work as the executive director of the Zena Rommett Floor-Barre Foundation and orchestrates two Floor-Barre certification courses each summer in Europe and New York City.

== Notable students ==
Rommett's teaching style drew students from all over the world. Rommett's students were dancers, musical theatre artists, athletes and non-dancers. Some notable students of Zena Rommett were Melissa Hayden, Tommy Tune, Patrick Swayze, Judith Jamison, Lar Lubovitch, John Curry, and Ulysses Dove. Ms. Hayden and Ms. Jamison have said that Rommett's Floor-Barre was critical to their rehabilitation following severe injuries.

== Family ==
Rommett was married to artist Alexis Nicoli Romanovich. They had two daughters, Melissa Romanovich and Camille Rommett Mouquinho. Zena's husband died in 1968. Robert Joffrey gave Zena the surname Rommett in 1965. Some other family members also adopted the surname Rommett.

== Final years ==
Rommett taught Floor Barre classes at Steps Studio in New York up until three months before her death. On November 10, 2010, Rommett died of cancer at the age of 90.
