= Toprock =

Breakdancing move

In breakdancing, toprock is foot movement performed while standing, serving as the opening display of style, and as a warm-up for transitions into the more acrobatic maneuvers of downrock. It allows the dancer to demonstrate coordination, flexibility, rhythm, and style. Breakers may devote considerable time to developing their toprock, which may include elements of salsa, Lindy Hop, Liquid dancing and the Robot.

Toprock can have several names based on region. The list of toprock steps are Indian Step/Cross Step, Cross over Indian step/Hip Twist, Salsa Step/Side Step, Kick Step, and Bronx Step.

== See also ==
- Freeze (b-boy move)
