= Breakdancing =

Style of street dance

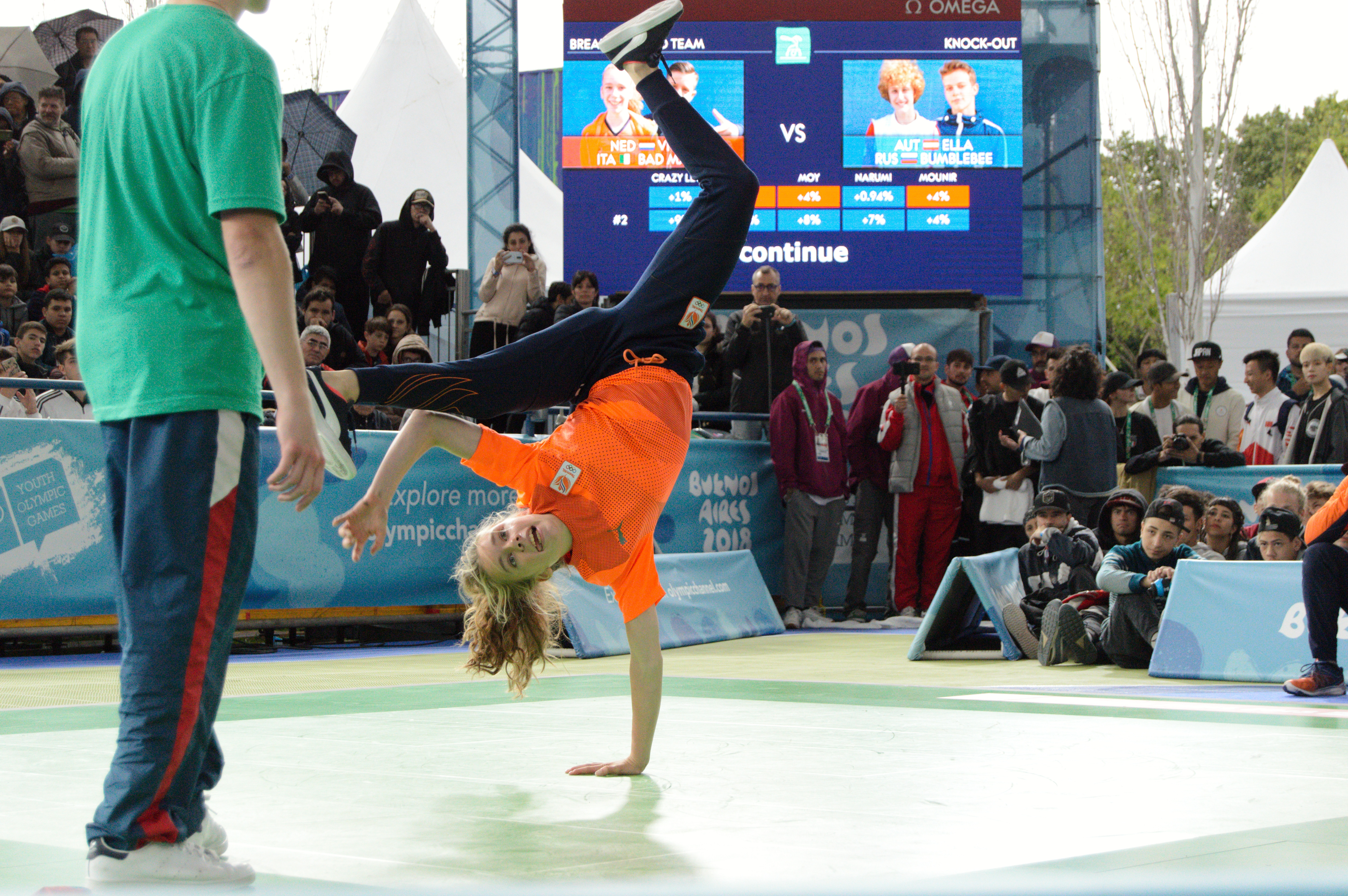
- Breaking at the 2018 Summer Youth Olympics
- Genre: Hip-hop dance
- Inventor: Street dancers
- Year: 1970s
- Origin: New York City, U.S.

Breaking in the street, 2013

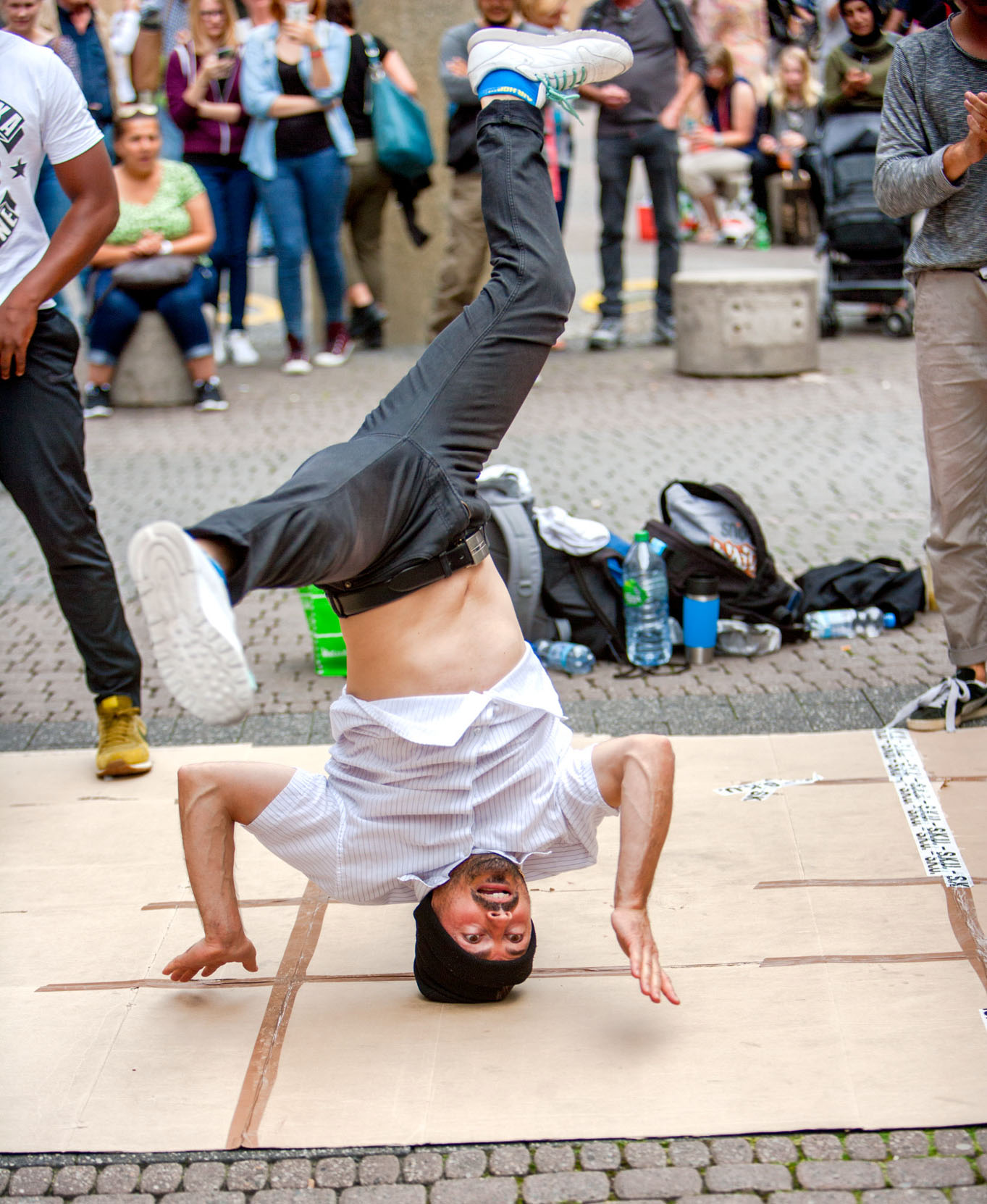
A breakdancer standing on his head in Cologne, Germany, 2017

Breakdancing or breaking, also called b-boying (when performed by men) or b-girling (when performed by women), is a style of street dance developed by African Americans and Puerto Ricans in the Bronx borough of New York City.

Breakdancing consists mainly of four kinds of movement—toprock, footwork, power moves, and freezes—and is typically set to songs containing drum breaks, especially in funk, soul, and hip-hop. Its modern dance elements originated among the poor youth of New York during the 1970s and early 1980s. It is tied to the birth of hip-hop, whose DJs played songs featuring rhythmic breaks for dancers.

The dance form has expanded globally, with an array of organizations and independent competitions supporting its growth. Breaking became an Olympic sport at the 2024 Summer Olympics in Paris, as per a December 7, 2020 decision by the International Olympic Committee, after a proposal by the World DanceSport Federation.

== Terminology ==
Breaking has interchangeably been called "breaking", "b-boying", "b-girling", and "breakdancing", but many in the culture prefer not to use "breakdancing." They argue that the original practitioners of the dance used breaking, and that breakdancing was used by the media to commercialize the dance. However, many still use "breakdancing" due to its popularity. Breakdancing is also inaccurately used as an umbrella term to describe other funk styles like popping or locking. Major competitions like The Olympics, Red Bull BC One, and World Breaking Classic use the term "breaking".

There are several contradictory explanations of where the term "breaking" came from. One of the most common is that it refers to the drum "breaks" in songs that are commonly looped in breaking music. However, early practitioners say that 'breaking' came from a slang term used by African Americans in the late 1960s and early 1970s. In The Freshest Kids, DJ Kool Herc says:

"It didn't come from 'breaks' on the record. It came from, this man 'broke'. He went to ... the breaking point. You understand? So, we just used that exaggeration of that term to the dancing."

Several other original breakers support this origin of the term.

The terms "b-boy" and "b-girl" were coined by DJ Kool Herc to describe dancers who came to his parties. These terms that would later spread to describe breakers in general and eventually to describe people influenced by hip hop culture.

== History ==
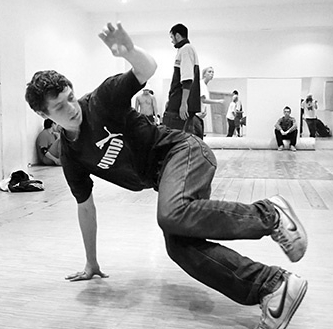
A breaker practicing downrock at a studio in Moscow

=== Influences ===
Many elements developed into breaking long before the 1970s. Michael Holman writes that West African dances performed by slaves, such as Juba, introduced the cipher — a circle of dancers where each dancer takes a turn to dance — and an enduring element of competition into early African American dance. After Irish immigrants started arriving in the United States in the 1850s, African Americans combined Juba dance with the Irish Jig to develop Tap Dance. According to Holman, Tap dance has "connections with all the other dances that eventually did evolve into breaking."

According to dance researcher Harri Heinilä, "It has been clear that the 'Breakdance' and other Hip Hop-related dances at the very least resemble or even were inherited from earlier African American dances, which have been collectively called jazz dance" The jazz/tap connection is corroborated by The Legendary Twins, early breakers who directly cite jazz dance figures like the Nicholas Brothers as inspiration for their developments and popularized jazz movements like the sweep.

When many of the early Bronx breakers were asked to name the first bboy, they responded with "James Brown" Brown's music and dance were the embodiment of black pride, self-expression, and individuality which stood out to pioneers like Kool Herc. In interviews, Herc said "I was listening to American music in Jamaica and my favorite artist was James Brown, "

Capoeira and breaking share several moves. Some claim that capoeira and breaking share a common African origin, while others claim a direct connection. However, several early breakers deny the possibility of direct influence. Since capoeira was present in New York around this time, the connection remains unclear.

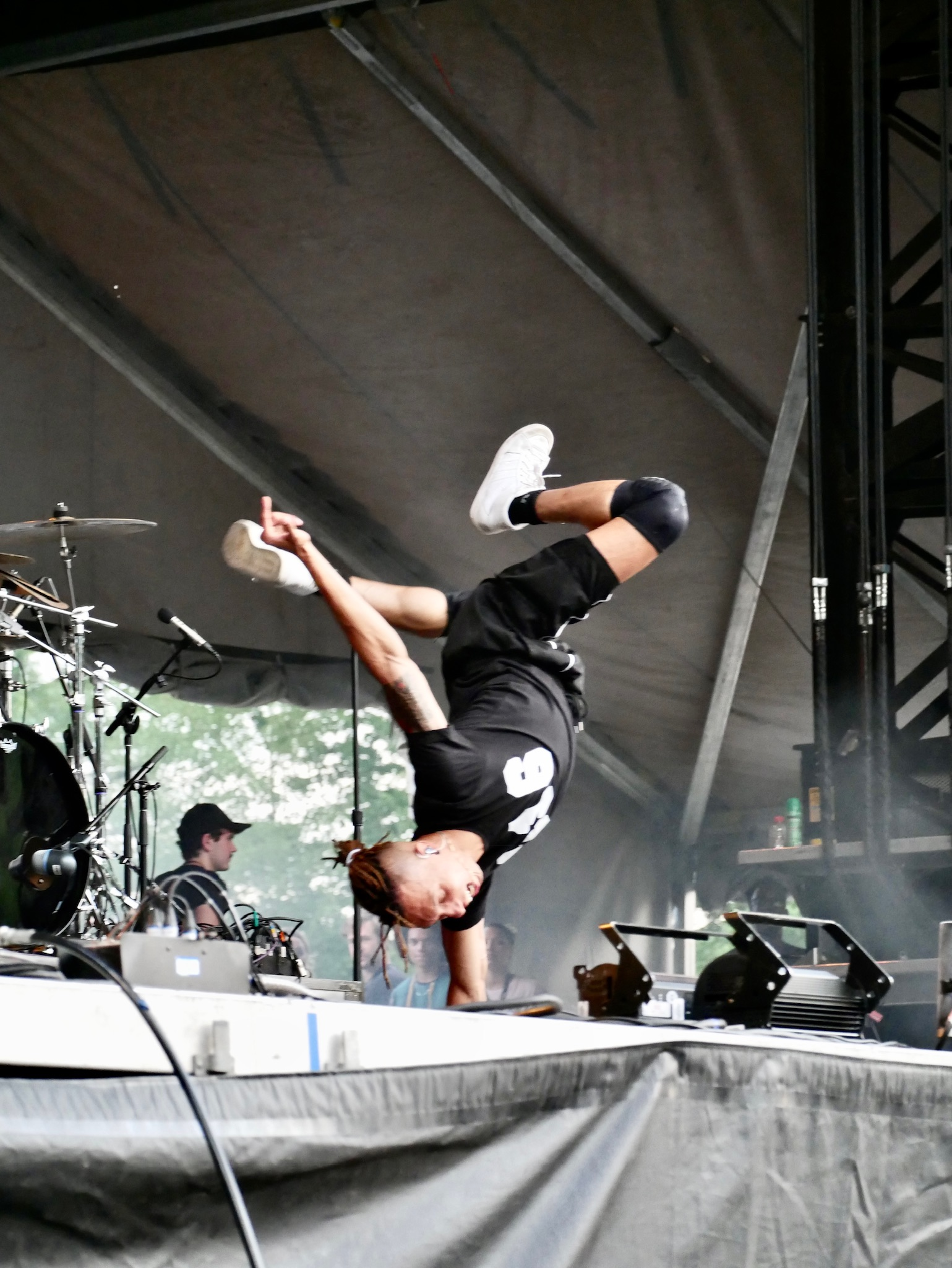
A break dancer performs onstage at a rap concert by artist Lecrae during the Alive Music Festival in 2023.

Early breakers Richard "Crazy Legs" Colon and Kenneth "Ken Swift" Gabbert cite James Brown and Kung Fu films (notably Bruce Lee films) as influences. Many of the acrobatic moves, such as the flare, show clear connections to gymnastics.

=== Kool Herc and Early Breaking ===
Clive "Kool Herc" Campbell is often credited as the founder of hip hop, and while people were breaking before his parties, he was a central figure in the early development of the dance, and he is credited with taking breaking out of the underground and into public spaces.

Before Kool Herc was a DJ he regularly went dancing at local clubs, house parties, and community centers in the Bronx that were predominantly attended by African American teens. One of the most popular of these clubs was the Plaza Tunnel, in the basement of the Concourse Plaza Hotel. Young dancers would dance irreverently at parties like these in ways that were called "freestyling", "going off", "burning", or "breaking".

These parties also introduced key breaking moves like the "pin drop" or "knee drop", and emphasized core values of uniqueness and individuality that are still prized in breaking. They included burning, a competitive dance that both males and females would take part in where they acted out insults or attacks towards each other. This part of the dance would later be known as battling.

Herc's approach to DJing was based in his background as a dancer at these parties. He wanted to improve upon the mixes other DJ's would play in ways that would make people more excited to dance. This commitment to playing music for breakers spawned innovations in music choice and turntable techniques that would make his events popular.

On August 11, 1973 Cindy Campbell threw a back to school party to raise money to buy schoolclothes. She asked Kool Herc, her older brother, to DJ. The location was the rec room of an apartment building on 1520 Sedgwick Avenue in the Bronx, which is now sometimes called the "birthplace of hip hop".

This party was such a success that the siblings continued renting out the room on an almost monthly basis, eventually filling up the courtyard. By 1975, the parties had grown so big that Herc had to rent out local dance halls instead.

As Herc's parties continued, he noticed that the breakers were waiting until the percussive drum breaks in the songs to do their most exciting moves. After about two years of throwing parties, Herc took several records with these drum fills and played them back to back, creating an extended section of the party just for breakers filled with songs like "Apache" by the Incredible Bongo Band, "The Mexican" by Babe Ruth, and "Yellow Sunshine" by Yellow Sunshine. This section of the party was a hit, and people started coming just to see the dancers.

Several core movements from breaking developed at this time: The two step toprock was developed at Herc's parties as a way of making space before starting to break. The Legendary Twins also developed the first uses of extended footwork at these parties, taking breaking to the floor, while Cholly Rock and Pow Wow built on this footwork by doing fast rotations on the hands and feet now called "Zulu Spins".

=== Cultural Expansion, Rock Steady Crew, and Mainstream Adoption ===
In the late 1970s, DJs like Grandmaster Flash had begun looping just the breaks in the songs, spurring a new style of breaking where dancers emphasized more acrobatic moves and extended floor work as top rocking became less important and receded into the background.

It was around this time when Latinos, especially Puerto Ricans, started learning the dance from its African American practitioners after breaking parties started being held outside. At this time, a lot of the original African American practitioners were ageing out of the dance or moving onto other dances. The formation of Rock Steady Crew was a good example of the racial integration and generational changes of this era. It formed when Jimmy Dee, an African American bboy, and Jimmy Lee, a Latino bboy formed a crew to keep the Rock (the dance) steady (alive).

Rock Steady Crew was soon passed down to Richard "Crazy Legs" Colon, who moved to Manhattan and expanded the crew by battling others in the area. Rock Steady Crew met photographer Henry Chalfant, who was interested in breaking through its connections to graffiti. He started running events with Rock Steady performing, and in 1981, invited Rock Steady to battle the Dynamic Rockers at Lincoln Center, which garnered major attention from major news sources like ABC News and the New York Times.

Soon after, Michael Holman started regularly inviting Rock Steady to battle the New York City Breakers at his hip hop nightclub, the Negril, where they danced alongside celebrities and built city wide reputation. In 1982, Rock Steady Crew got a part dancing in the movie Flashdance, which propelled breaking and Rock Steady to worldwide fame.

Breaking "hit the West Coast with a fury in '82" after Flashdance. Crews like the Shake City Rockers and Air Force crew emerged. These West Coast crews innovated spinning and power moves to their more modern forms. Many of the first LA breakers started at the Radiotron community center, which became a hub for west coast hip hop. Breaking would become so popular, it was featured at performances like the 1984 LA Olympics, providing people worldwide with their first experience of breaking.

=== Return to the Underground and International Resurgence ===
Breaking was considered a fad and by 1986, breaking had largely faded from public consciousness as many dancers quit or moved on. However the dance spread internationally to countries like Japan, Germany, France and Canada through movies featuring breaking and breakers from New York touring internationally. Few people continued practicing the dance during these years, and it took years of slow development for scenes to reform and reconnect with one another.

In 1991 the first international breaking competition, Battle of the Year, was held in Hanover Germany. Battle of the Year, along with more international competitions like BBoy Summit and Freestyle Session brought new energy and motivation to the scene in the 1990s. Crews began to redevelop independently around the world. These new dancers traded VHS tapes and traveled across countries to dance and trade knowledge with one another as the dance reached new heights of popularity towards the late 1990s.

== Major competitions ==
- Battle of the Year (BOTY) was founded in 1990 by Thomas Hergenröther in Germany. It is the first and largest international breakdancing competition for breakdance crews. BOTY holds regional qualifying tournaments in several countries such as Zimbabwe, Japan, Israel, Algeria, Indonesia, and the Balkans. Crews who win these tournaments go on to compete in the final championship in Montpellier, France. BOTY was featured in the independent documentary Planet B-Boy (2007) that filmed five dance crews training for the 2005 championship. A 3D film Battle of the Year was released in January 2013. It was directed by Benson Lee who also directed Planet B-Boy.
- The Notorious IBE is a Dutch-based breakdancing competition founded in 1998. IBE (International Breakdance Event) is not a traditional competition because there are not any stages or judges. Instead, there are timed competitive events that take place in large multitiered ciphers—circular dance spaces surrounded by observers—where the winners are determined by audience approval. There are several kinds of events such as the b-girl crew battle, the Seven 2 Smoke battle (eight top ranked breakers battle each other to determine the overall winner), the All vs. All continental battle (all the American breakers vs. all the European breakers vs. the Asian breakers vs. Mexican/Brazilian breakers), and the Circle Prinz IBE. The Circle Prinz IBE is a knockout tournament that takes place in multiple smaller cipher battles until the last standing breaker is declared the winner. IBE also hosts the European finals for the UK B-Boy Championships.
- Chelles Battle Pro was created in 2001 and it is held every year in Chelles, France. There are two competitions. One is a kids competition for solo breakers who are 12 years old or younger. The other competition is a knock-out tournament for eight breaker crews. Some crews have to qualify at their country's local tournament; others are invited straight to the finale.
- Red Bull BC One was created in 2004 by Red Bull and is hosted in a different country every year. The competition brings together the top 16 breakers from around the world. Six spots are earned through six regional qualifying tournaments. The other 10 spots are reserved for last year's winner, wild card selections, and recommendations from an international panel of experts. A past participant of the competition is world record holder Mauro "Cico" (pronounced CHEE-co) Peruzzi. B-boy Cico holds the world record in the 1990s. A 1990 is a move in which a breaker spins continuously on one hand—a hand spin rather than a head spin. Cico broke the record by spinning 27 times. A documentary based on the competition called Turn It Loose (2009) profiled six breakdancers' training for the 2007 championship in Johannesburg. Two of these breakdancers were Ali "Lilou" Ramdani from Pockémon Crew and Omar "Roxrite" Delgado from Squadron.

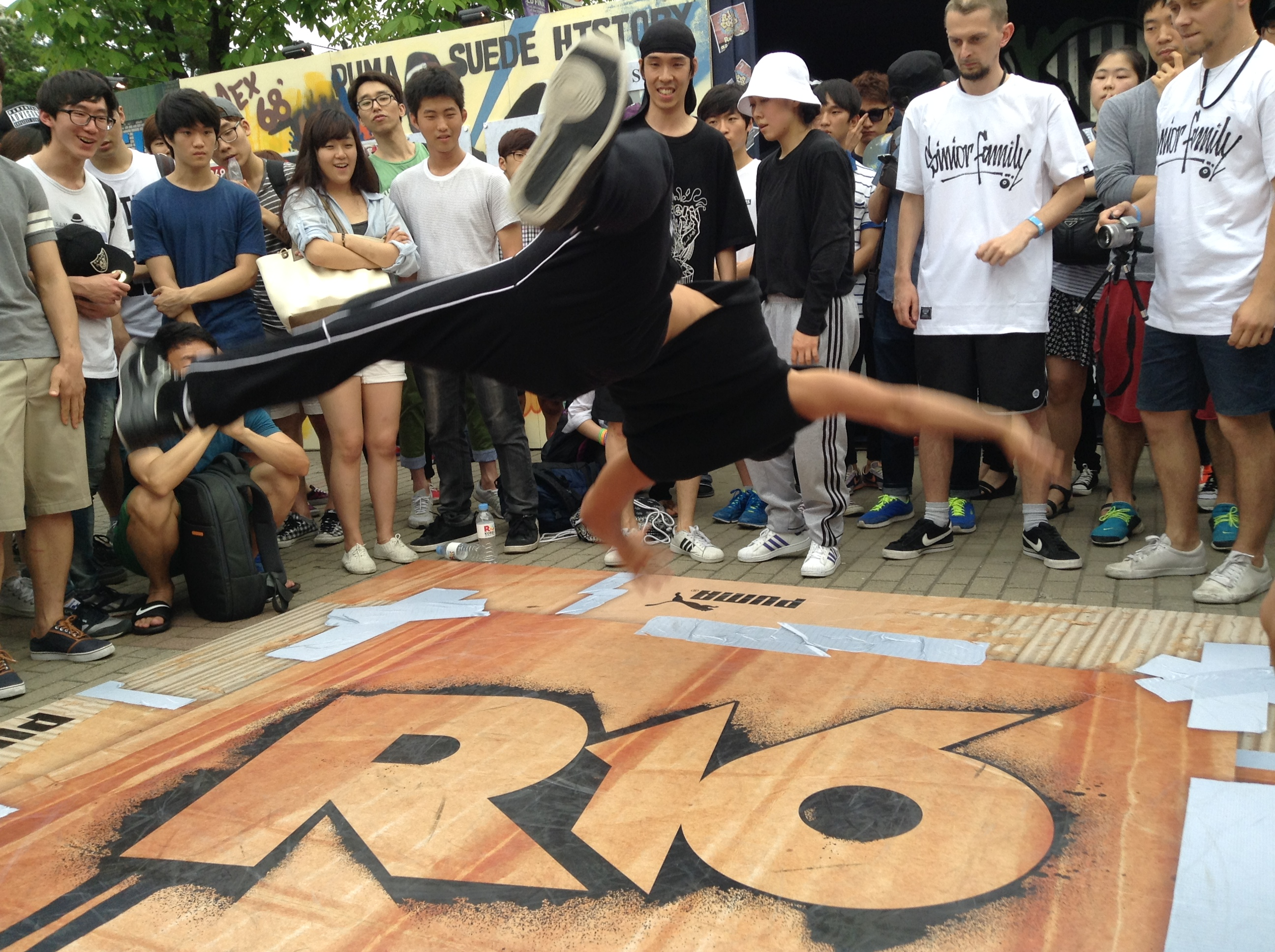
A breakdancer does an air-flare in a cypher at R16 Korea 2014

- R16 Korea is a South Korean breakdancing competition founded in 2007 by Asian Americans Charlie Shin and John Jay Chon. Like BOTY and Red Bull BC One put together, Respect16 is a competition for the top 16 ranked crews in the world. What sets it apart from other competitions is that it is sponsored by the government and broadcast live on Korean television and in several countries in Europe. In 2011, R16 instituted a new judging system that was created to eliminate bias and set a unified and fair standard for the way breakdance battles should be judged. With the new system, breakers are judged against five criteria: foundation, dynamics (power moves), battle, originality, and execution. There is one judge for each category and the scores are shown on a large screen during battles so that the audience can see who is winning at any given moment.
- The Youth Olympic Games incorporated breakdancing as part of its programme, starting with the 2018 Summer Youth Olympics in Buenos Aires. Breakdancing is eligible for inclusion as it is a discipline of dancesport, which is recognised by the International Olympic Committee. The competition featured men's, women's and mixed-team events in a one-on-one battle format.
- The 2024 Summer Olympics in Paris saw the debut of breaking as an Olympic sport. 16 male and 16 female breakers – according to Olympic terminology – competed in head-to-head matches. IOC President Thomas Bach said that breaking was added to draw more interest from young people in the Olympics. Ami Yuasa won the gold medal for Japan in the women's event, and Philip Kim took home gold for Canada in the men's. It will not be included in the 2028 Olympics in Los Angeles, but may return for the 2032 Olympics in Brisbane, Australia.

== Worldwide expansion ==
=== Australia ===
By the early 1990s, "Australia was a world leading power move country", according to 2020s award-winning breaker Kid Tek. Stars of the time included B-Boy All Stars from Brisbane, who appeared on the American talent show Star Search in 1992. During the 2000s, the style evolved from focussing on power moves back to foundational styles. Influential Bronx breaker Alien Ness visited Melbourne to judge a competition, who influenced local breakers to adopt this shift in style. Notable crews of that time were Fresh Sox from Melbourne and SKB (aka Street Kulture Breakerz), from Western Sydney, who recruited Korean breakers B-Boy Blond and B-Boy Blue. SKB were continuing to compete as of 2023.

The breaking scene was peaking around 2010, but dipped between 2013 and 2017. After it was announced that breakdancing was going to be included as a sport in the 2024 Olympics, its popularity surged again. Owing to the COVID-19 pandemic in 2020–21, because of social distancing measures, breakers started doing battle online, via Zoom or Instagram. Australian breakers started developing more creative and innovative styles, and "pushing international barriers", according to Kid Tek. The qualifying Australian entrants to the Olympics were b-girl Raygun (36-year-old university lecturer Rachael Gunn), and 16-year-old b-boy Jeff "J Attack" Dunne. Neither made it out of the round-robin stage, and Raygun was widely mocked online for her creative "kangaroo hop" moves, with a video clip of her performance going viral, as well as discussed in the press. Both entrants chose to wear their team tracksuit rather than street clothes.

=== Brazil ===
Ismael Toledo was one of the first breakers in Brazil. In 1984, he moved to the United States to study dance. While in the U.S. he discovered breakdancing and ended up meeting breaker Crazy Legs who personally mentored him for the four years that followed. After becoming proficient in breakdancing, he moved back to São Paulo and started to organize crews and enter international competitions. He eventually opened a hip-hop dance studio called the Hip-Hop Street College.

=== Cambodia ===
Born in Thailand and raised in the United States, Tuy "KK" Sobil started a community center called Tiny Toones in Phnom Penh, Cambodia in 2005 where he uses dancing, hip-hop music, and art to teach Cambodian youth language skills, computer skills, and life skills (hygiene, sex education, counseling). His organization helps roughly 5,000 youths each year, among whom is Diamond, deemed to be Cambodia's first b-girl.

=== Canada ===
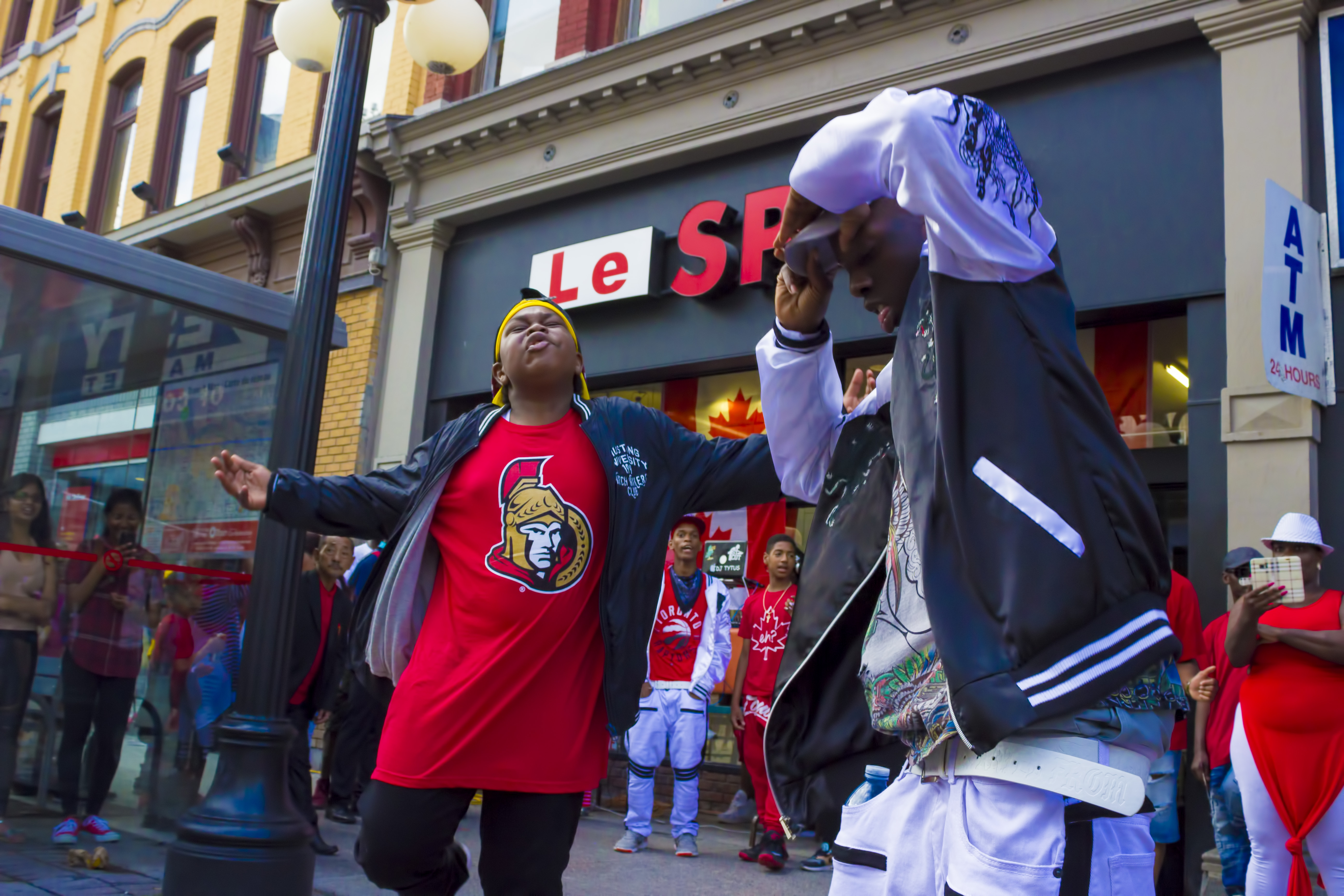
Ottawa Youth breakdancing during Canada 150 Celebrations

There are several ways breakdancing came to Canada. During the late 1970s and early 1980s, films such as Breakin' (1984), Beat Street (1984), and the immigration of people from Chicago, New York, Detroit, Seattle, and Los Angeles introduced dance styles from the United States. Breakdancing expanded in Canada from there, with crews like Canadian Floormasters, co-founded in Ottawa in 1983, taking over the 80's scene, and New Energy opening for James Brown in 1984 at the Palladium in Montreal after winning the Break Dance '84 contest. Leading into the 90's, crews like Bag of Trix, Rakunz, Intrikit, Contents Under Pressure, Supernaturalz, Boogie Brats, and Red Power Squad, led the scene throughout the rest of the past two decades and counting.

In the 2024 Paris Olympics men's gold medal showdown, Canada's Philip "Phil Wizard" Kim swept 3 rounds against France's Danis "Danny Dan" Civil with judges voting 23–4.

=== China ===
In China, many people copy breakdancing videos from abroad and distribute them back to the mainland. Although it is still an underground culture in China because of some restrictions, breakdancing was reported to be a growing presence in 2013.

=== France ===
Breakdancing took off in France in the early 1980s with the creation of groups such as the Paris City Breakers (who styled themselves after the well-known New York City Breakers). In 1984, France became the first country in the world to have a regularly and nationally broadcast television show about Hip Hop—hosted by Sidney Duteil—with a focus on Hip Hop dance. This show led to the explosion of Hip Hop dance in France, with many new crews appearing on the scene.

=== Japan ===
Breakdancing in Japan was introduced in 1983 following the release of the movie Wild Style. The release of the movie was accompanied by a tour by the Rock Steady Crew and many Japanese were captivated. Other movies such as Flashdance followed and furthered the breakdance craze. Crazy-A, the leader of the Tokyo chapter of the Rock Steady Crew, was dragged to see Flashdance by his then girlfriend and walked out captivated by the dance form and became one its earliest and one of the most influential breakers in Japanese history. Groups began to spring up as well, with early groups such as Tokyo B-Boys, Dynamic Rock Force (American kids from Yokota AB), B-5 Crew, and Mystic Movers popping up in Harajuku. The breakdancing community in Japan found a home in Tokyo's Yoyogi Park in Harajuku, which still remains an active area for breakdancers and hip-hop enthusiasts. As hip-hop continued to grow in Japan, so did breakdancing and the breakdancing communities. Following the introduction of international breakdancing competitions, Japan began to compete and were praised for their agility and precision, yet they were criticized in the beginning for lacking originality.

The Japanese began to truly flourish on the international stage following the breakdancing career of Taisuke Nonaka, known simply as Taisuke. Taisuke began to dominate the international scene and led the Japanese team Floorriorz to win the BOTY in 2015 against crew Kienjuice from Belarus. Despite Taisuke's successful career in group competitions, he failed to win the solo Red Bull BC One competition, an individual breakdancing championship that had continued to evade Japanese b-boys. The first Japanese to win the BC One competition became B-Boy Issei in 2016. B-girls are also prevalent in Japan: following the introduction of a female BC One competition in 2018, Japanese b-girl Ami Yuasa became the first female champion. Notable Japanese b-boy crews include FoundNation and Floorriorz; notable Japanese b-girl crews include Queen of Queens and Nishikasai. Body Carnival is a notable mixed-sex crew (comprising both b-boys and -girls).

Japanese b-girl Ami won the first-ever Olympic gold medal for breakdancing at the Paris 2024 Olympics.

=== South Korea ===
Breakdancing was first introduced to South Korea by American soldiers shortly after its surge of popularity in the U.S. during the 1980s, but it was not until the late 1990s that the culture and dance took hold. 1997 is known as the "Year Zero of Korean breaking". A Korean-American hip hop promoter named John Jay Chon was visiting his family in Seoul and while he was there, he met a crew named Expression Crew in a club. He gave them a VHS tape of a Los Angeles breakdancing competition called Radiotron. A year later when he returned, Chon found that his video and others like his had been copied and dubbed numerous times, and were feeding an ever-growing breaker community.

In 2002, Korea's Expression Crew won the prestigious international breakdancing competition Battle of the Year, exposing the skill of the country's breakers to the rest of the world. Since then, the Korean government has capitalized on the popularity of the dance and has promoted it alongside Korean culture. R-16 Korea is the most well-known government-sponsored breakdancing event, and is hosted by the Korea Tourism Organization and supported by the Ministry of Culture, Sports, and Tourism.

Famous breakdancing crews from Korea include Morning of Owl, Jinjo Crew, Rivers Crew and Gamblerz.

=== Soviet Union ===
In the 1980s the Soviet Union was in a state of the Cold War with the countries of the Western Bloc. Soviet people lived behind the Iron Curtain, so they usually learned the new fashion trends emerging in the capitalist countries with some delay. The Soviet Union first learned of breakdancing in 1984, when videotapes of the films Breakin', Breakin' 2 and Beat Street got into the country. In the USSR these movies were not released officially. They were brought home by Soviet citizens who had the opportunity to travel to Western countries (for example, by diplomats). Originally, the dance became popular in big cities: Moscow and Leningrad, as well as in the Baltic republics (some citizens of these Soviet republics had the opportunity to watch Western television). The attitude of the authorities to the new dance that came from the West was negative.

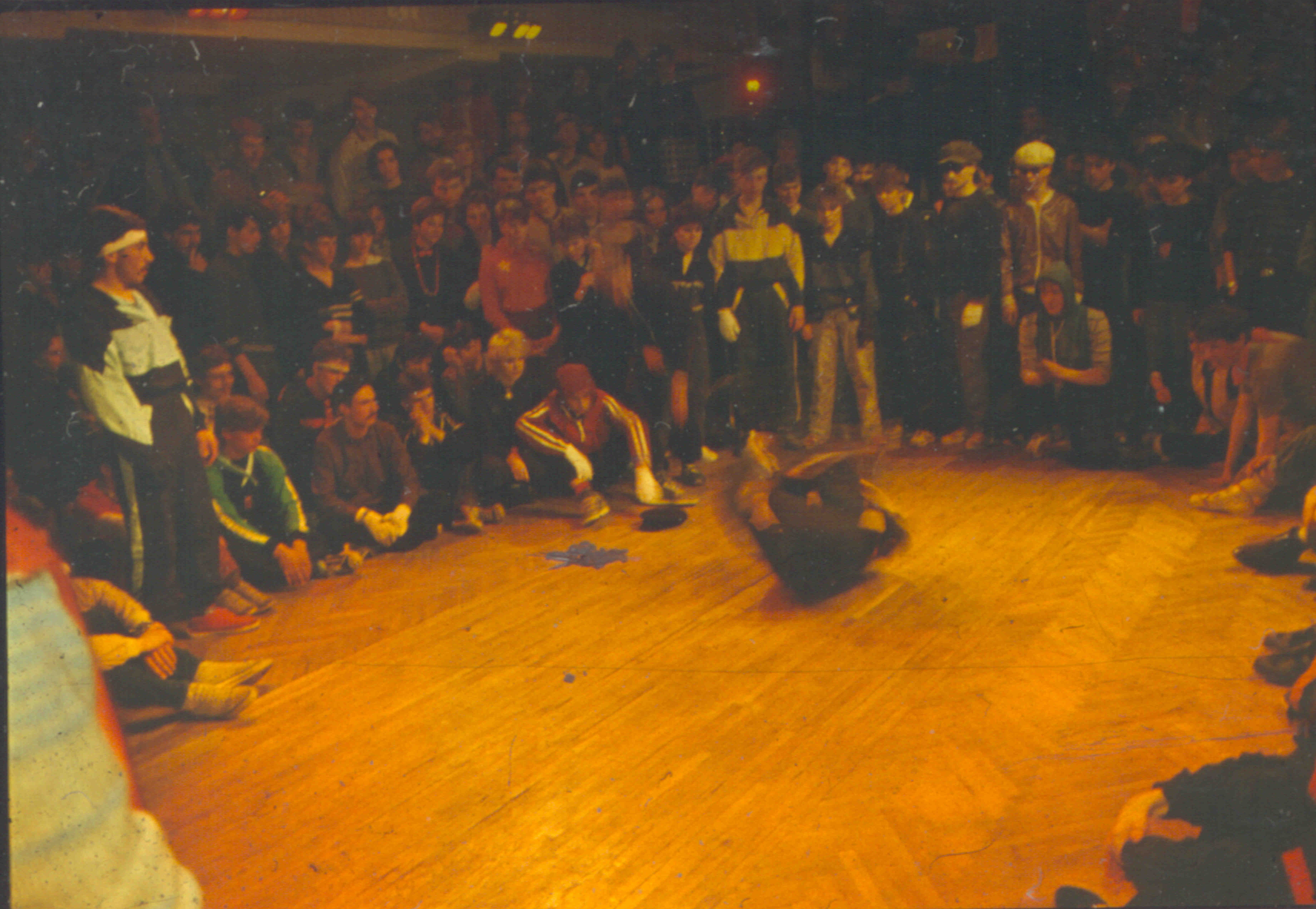
Breakdancing performance in Riga, Latvian SSR, 1986

The situation changed in 1985 with Mikhail Gorbachev who came to power and with the beginning of the Perestroika policy. The first to legalize the new dance were dancers from the Baltic republics. They presented this dance as the "protest against the arbitrariness of the capitalists", explaining that the dance was invented by Black Americans from poor neighborhoods. In 1985 the performance of Czech Jiří Korn was shown in the program "Morning Post", and became one of the first official demonstrations of breakdancing on Soviet television. With the support of the Leninist Young Communist League in 1986 breakdance festivals were held in the cities of the Baltic republics (Tallinn, Palanga, Riga). The next step was the spreading of the similar festivals to other Soviet republics. Festivals were held in Donetsk (Ukraine), Vitebsk (Belarus), Gorky (Russia). Breakdancing could be seen in Soviet cinema: Dancing on the Roof (1985), Courier (1986), Publication (1988). By the end of the decade the dance became almost ubiquitous. At almost any disco or school dance one could see a person dancing in the "robot" style.

In the early 1990s, the country experienced a severe economic and political crisis. With the dissolution of the Soviet Union, the breakdance craze was over and breakdancing became dated. The next wave of interest in breakdancing in Russia would only occur in the late 90s.

== Dance elements ==
Gravity Benders crew showcasing the four elements of breakdancing — toprock, footwork, freezes, and power moves – some crew choreography, and a short battle

There are four primary elements that form breakdancing: toprock, footwork, power moves, and freezes.

- Toprock generally refers to any string of steps performed from a standing position. It is usually the first and foremost opening display of style, though dancers often transition from other aspects of breakdancing to toprock and back. Toprock has a variety of steps which can each be varied according to the dancer's expression (i.e. aggressive, calm, excited). A great deal of freedom is allowed in the definition of toprock: as long as the dancer maintains cleanliness, form, and attitude, theoretically anything can be toprock. Toprock can draw upon many other dance styles such as popping, locking, tap dance, Lindy hop, or house dance. Transitions from toprock to footwork and power moves are called "drops".
- Footwork (also known as "downrock" or "floorwork") is used to describe any movement on the floor with the hands supporting the dancer as much as the feet. Footwork includes moves such as the foundational 6-step, its variants such as the 3-step, and other moves such as CCs and kickouts. The most basic of footwork is done entirely on feet and hands but more complex variations can involve the knees and elbows when threading limbs through each other.
- Power moves are acrobatic moves that require momentum, speed, endurance, strength, flexibility, and control to execute. The breaker is generally supported by his upper body while the rest of his body creates circular momentum. Some examples are the windmill, swipe, back spin, and head spin. Some power moves are borrowed from gymnastics and martial arts. An example of a power move taken from gymnastics is the Thomas Flair which is shortened and spelled flare in breakdancing.
- Freezes are stylish poses that require the breaker to suspend himself or herself off the ground using upper body strength in poses such as the pike. They are used to emphasize strong beats in the music and often signal the end of a set. Freezes can be linked into chains or "stacks" where breakers go from freeze to freeze to freeze in order to hit the beats of the music, which displays musicality and physical strength.

== Styles ==
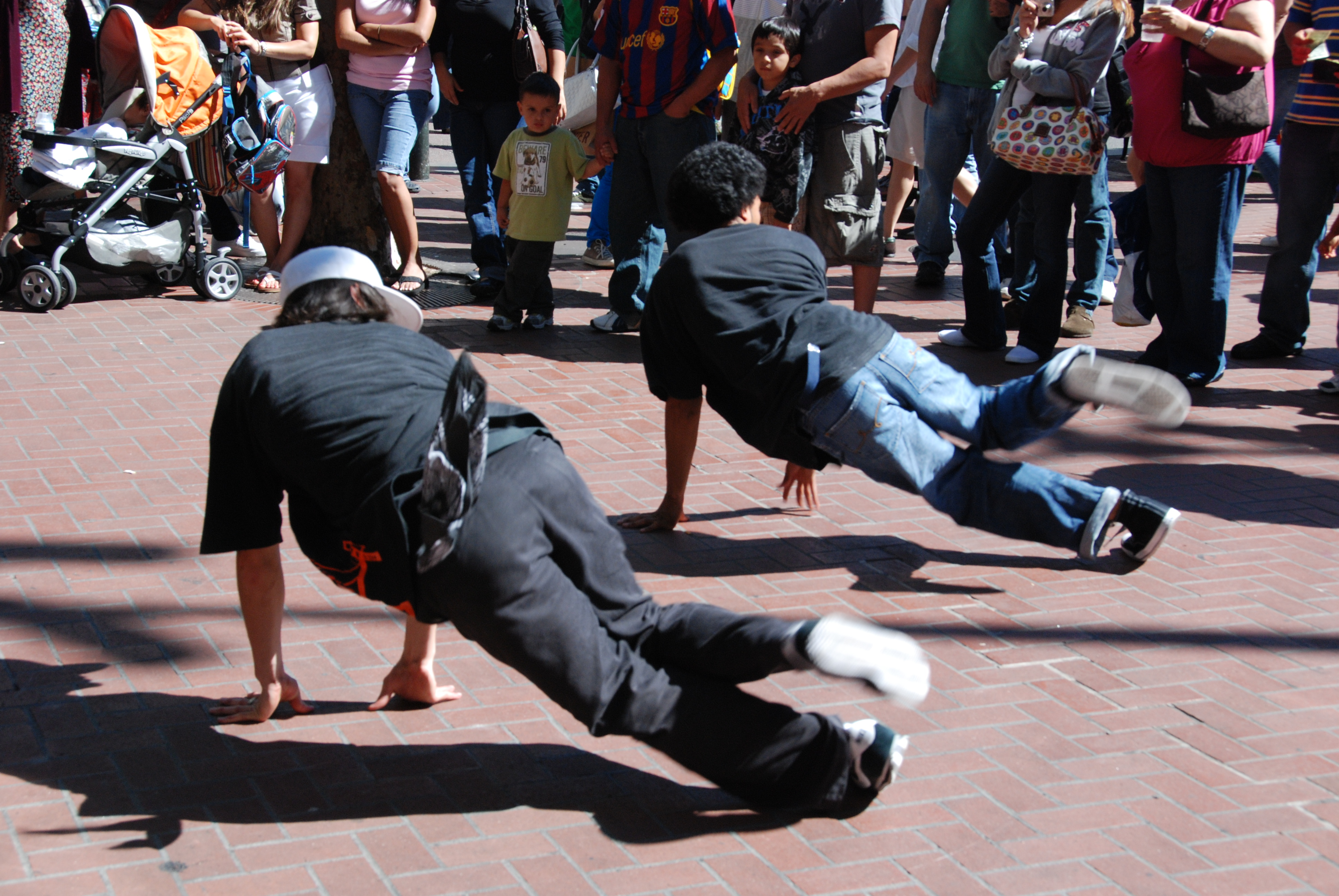
B-boys performing on San Francisco's Powell Street in 2008

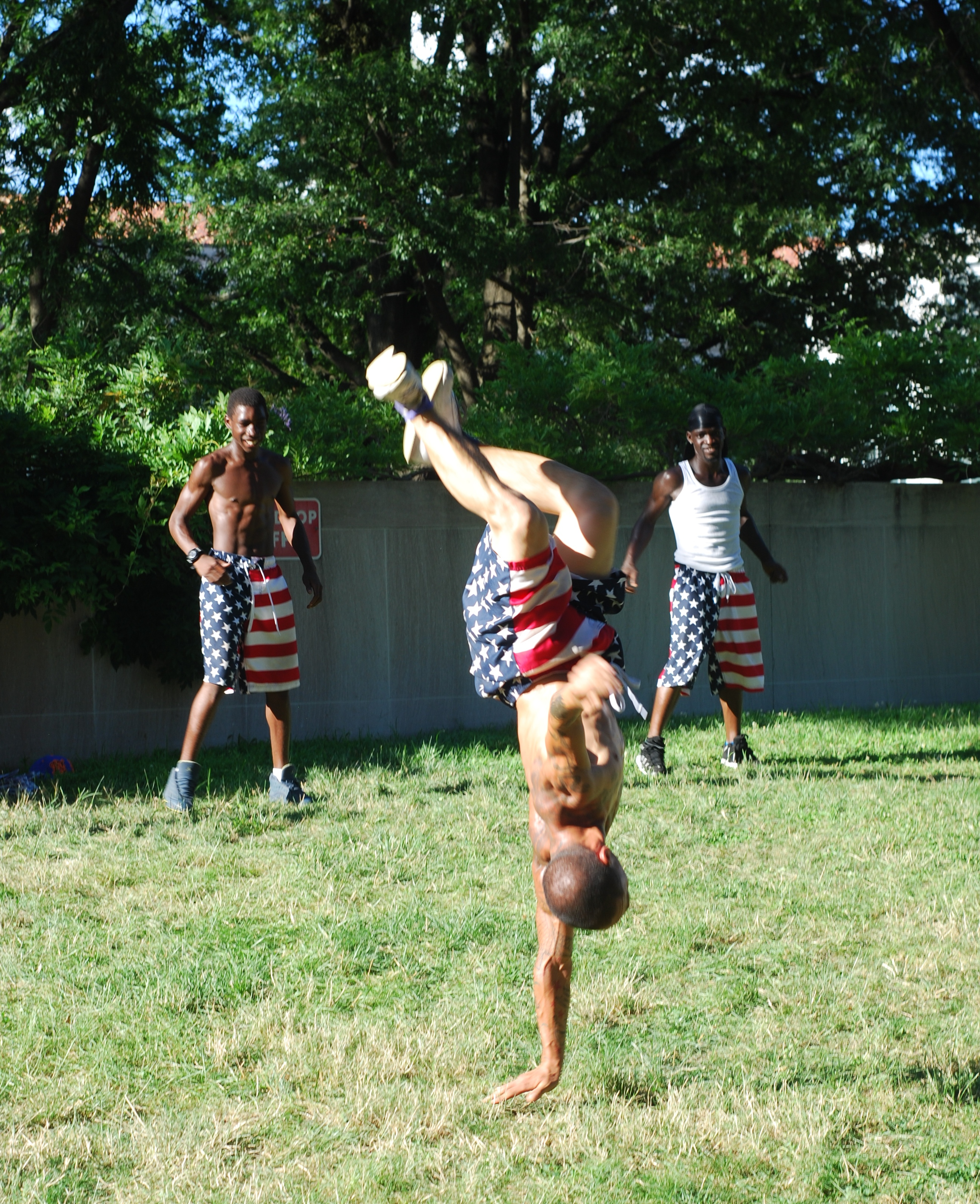

Many dancers combine different dances, movements, and ideas with breaking moves in order to create their own unique and individual style of breaking. These individual styles can generally be categorized into broader styles, including:

- Power: This style is what most members of the general public associate with the term "breakdancing". Power moves comprise full-body spins and rotations that give the illusion of defying gravity. Examples of power moves include head spins, backspins, windmills, flares, air tracks/air flares, 1990s, 2000s, jackhammers, crickets, turtles, hand glides, halos, and elbow spins. Those breakers who use "power moves" almost exclusively in their sets are referred to as "power heads".
- Abstract: A very broad style which may include the incorporation of "threading" footwork, freestyle movement to hit beats, house dance, and "circus" styles (tricks, contortion, etc.).
- Blow-up: A style which focuses on the "wow factor" of certain power moves, freezes, and circus styles. Blowups consist of performing a sequence of as many difficult trick combinations in as quick succession as possible in order to "smack" or exceed the virtuosity of the other breaker's performance. The names of some of these moves are air baby, hollow backs, solar eclipse, and reverse air baby, among others. The main goal in blow-up style is the rapid transition through a sequence of power moves, ending in a skillful freeze or "suicide". Like freezes, a suicide is used to emphasize a strong beat in the music and signal the end to a routine. While freezes draw attention to a controlled final position, suicides draw attention to the motion of falling or losing control. B-boys or b-girls will make it appear that they have lost control and fall onto their backs, stomachs, etc. The more painful the suicide appears, the more impressive it is, but breakers execute them in a way to minimize pain.
- Flavor: A style that is based more on elaborate toprock, footwork, and/or freezes. This style is focused more on the beat and musicality of the song than having to rely on power moves. Breakers who base their dance on "flavor" or style are known as "style heads".

Styles have historically varied from between regions and between generations, with different regions emphasizing and innovating different parts of the dance.

However, with many new breakers learning breaking from the internet, some people such as Jacob "Kujo" Lyons criticize how the internet makes individual and regional styles more homogeneous. In a 2012 interview with B-Boy Magazine he expressed his frustration:

… because everybody watches the same videos online, everybody ends up looking very similar. The differences between individual b-boys, between crews, between cities/states/countries/continents, have largely disappeared. It used to be that you could tell what city a b-boy was from by the way he danced. Not anymore. But I've been saying these things for almost a decade, and most people don't listen, but continue watching the same videos and dancing the same way. It's what I call the "international style", or the "Youtube style".

Luis "Alien Ness" Martinez, the president of Mighty Zulu Kings, expressed a similar frustration in a 2009 interview.

=== Uprock ===
Breaking started as toprock, footwork-oriented dance moves performed standing up, but as dance crews began to experiment, breaking took moves and rhythm from uprock, a dance that developed in the 1960s. Uprock, also known as Brooklyn uprock, is a more aggressive dance style commonly performed between two partners that feature intricate footwork and hitting motions, mimicking a fight. As a separate dance style, it never gained the same widespread popularity as breaking, except for some specific moves adopted by breakers who use it as a variation for their toprock. Uprock is also stated to have roots in gangs, as an expressive medium used to settle turf disputes, with the winner deciding the location of a future battle. Although some disagree that breaking ever played a part in mediating gang rivalry, the early growth of breaking still primarily served to assist the poor youth of the Bronx to stray away from gang violence and rather expend their time and energy towards an artistic dance. One example is former gang leader Afrika Bambaataa, who hosted hip-hop parties and vowed to specifically use hip-hop to support children away from gang violence. He would eventually form the Universal Zulu Nation to further his message.

Some breakers argue that because uprock was originally a separate dance style it should never be mixed with breaking and that the uprock moves performed by breakers today are not the original moves but imitations that only show a small part of the original uprock style.

== Music ==
The musical selection for breakdancing is not restricted to hip-hop music as long as the tempo and beat pattern conditions are met. Breakdancing can be readily adapted to different music genres with the aid of remixing. The original songs that popularized the dance form borrow significantly from progressive genres of funk, soul, disco, electro, and jazz funk. A musical canon of these traditional b-boy songs have since developed, songs that were once expected to be played at every b-boying event. As the dance form grew, this standardization of classic songs prompted innovation of dance moves and break beats that reimagined the standard melodies. These songs include "Give It Up or Turn It a Loose" by James Brown, "Apache" by the Incredible Bongo Band, and "The Mexican" by Babe Ruth to name a few.

The most common feature of breakdance music exists in musical breaks, or compilations formed from samples taken from different songs which are then looped and chained together by the DJ. The tempo generally ranges between 110 and 135 beats per minute with shuffled sixteenth and quarter beats in the percussive pattern. History credits DJ Kool Herc for the invention of this concept later termed the break beat.

== Female presence ==
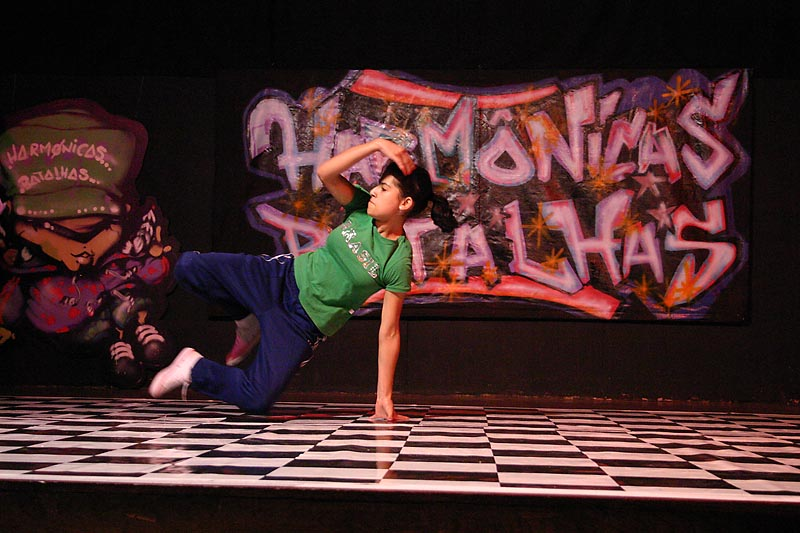
A female breaker performs in São Paulo, Brazil.

Similar to other hip-hop subcultures, such as graffiti writing, rapping, and DJing, breakers are predominantly male, but this is not to say that women breakers, b-girls, are invisible or nonexistent. Female participants, such as Daisy Castro (also known as Baby Love of Rock Steady Crew), attest that women have been breakdancing since its inception. Critics argue that it is unfair to make a sweeping generalization about these inequalities because women have begun to play a larger role in the breakdancing scene.

Some people have pointed to a lack of promotion as a barrier, as full-time b-girl Firefly stated in a BBC piece: "It's getting more popular. There are a lot more girls involved. The problem is that promoters are not putting on enough female-only battles." Growing interest is being shown in changing the traditional image of women in hip-hop culture (and by extension, breakdance culture) to a more positive, empowered role in the modern hip-hop scene.

In 2018, Japan's B-Girl Ami became the first B-Girl world champion of Red Bull BC One. Although B-Girl Ayumi had been invited as a competitor for the 2017 championship, it was only until 2018 that a 16 B-Girl bracket was featured as part of the main event.

== Media exposure ==
=== Film ===
In the past 50 years, various films have depicted the dance. In the early 1980s, several films depicted breakdancing including Fame, Wild Style, Flashdance, Breakin', Breakin' 2: Electric Boogaloo, Delivery Boys, Krush Groove, and Beat Street. In 1985, at the height of breakdancing's popularity, Donnie Yen starred in a Hong Kong film called Mismatched Couples in which he performed various breaking moves.

The 2000s saw a resurgence of films and television series featuring breakdancing that continued into the early 2010s:

- The 2013 American 3D dance film Battle of the Year is a drama about the dance competition of the same name.
- The Step Up films (2006–14) are dance movies that focus on the passion and love of dance. Breakdancing is featured in all five films, Step Up, Step Up 2: The Streets, Step Up 3D, and Step Up Revolution, and Step Up: All In, as well as the TV series Step Up: High Water.
- The 2007 comedy Kickin' It Old Skool stars Jamie Kennedy as a breakdancer who hits his head during a talent show and wakes up from a coma in the year 2007, then plans to get his breakdancing team back together.
- The 2009 British drama film Fish Tank stars Katie Jarvis as a 15-year-old who regularly practices hip-hop dance, including breakdancing, in her council estate.
- The 2004 anime television series Samurai Champloo features one of the main characters, Mugen, using a fighting style based on breakdancing.
- The 2009 Thai martial arts film Raging Phoenix features a fictional martial art called meiraiyutth based on a combination of Muay Thai and breakdancing.
- The 2001 comedy film Zoolander depicts Zoolander (Ben Stiller) and Hansel (Owen Wilson) performing breakdance moves on a catwalk.

Several documentary films have been made about breakdancing:

- The 1983 PBS documentary Style Wars chronicled New York graffiti artists, but also includes some breakdancing.
- The 2007 documentary Planet B-Boy follows five crews from around the world in their journey to the international breakdancing competition Battle of the Year. The Planet B-Boy documentary was the inspiration for the 2013 American 3D dance film Battle of the Year, a drama about the competition of the same name.
- The 2010 German documentary Neukölln Unlimited depicts the life of two breakdancing brothers in Berlin that try to use their dancing talents to secure a livelihood. Breakdancing moves are sometimes incorporated into the choreography of films featuring martial arts. This is due to the visually pleasing aspect of the dance, no matter how ridiculous or useless it would be in an actual fight.

=== Television ===
In the United States, Breakdancing is widely referred to in TV advertising, as well as news, travelogue, and documentary segments, as an indicator of youth/street culture. From a production point of view the style is visually arresting, instantly recognizable, and conducive to fast-editing, while the ethos is multi ethnic, energetic, and edgy, but free from the gangster-laden overtones of much rap-culture imagery. Its usability as a visual cliché benefits sponsorship, despite the relatively small following of the genre itself.

The dance shows So You Think You Can Dance and America's Best Dance Crew arguably brought breakdancing back to the forefront of pop culture in the United States, similar to the popularity it had enjoyed in the 1980s. The American drama television series Step Up: High Water, a series focused on breakdancing and other forms of hip-hop dance, premiered on March 20, 2019.

Since breakdancing's popularity surge in South Korea, it has been featured in various TV dramas and commercials. Break is a 2006 South Korean miniseries about a breakdancing competition. Over the Rainbow is a 2006 South Korean drama series centered on different characters who are brought together by breakdancing. Showdown, a breakdancing competition game show hosted by Jay Park, premiered in South Korea on March 18, 2022.

=== Literature ===
- In 1997, Kim Soo Yong began serialization of the first breakdancing themed comic, Hip Hop. The comic sold over 1.5 million books and it helped to introduce breakdancing and hip-hop culture to Korean youth.
- The first breakdancing themed novel, Kid B, was published by Houghton Mifflin in 2006. The author, Linden Dalecki, was an amateur breaker in high school and directed a short documentary film about Texas breakdancing culture before writing the novel. The novel was inspired by Dalecki's short story The B-Boys of Beaumont, which won the 2004 Austin Chronicle short story contest.
- Breakin' the city, a photo book by Nicolaus Schmidt, portrays breakers from the Bronx and Brooklyn wheeling around on subway cars, in city plazas, and on sidewalks in New York City. Published in 2011, it features six New York based breakdance crews photographed between 2007 and 2009.
- Breakdancing: Mr. Fresh and the Supreme Rockers Show You How (Avon Books, 1984) was an introductory reference for newcomers to the "breakin'" style of dance as it evolved in North America in the 1970s and 1980s.

=== Video gaming ===
A few video games feature breaking, including:

- Break Dance is an 8-bit computer game by Epyx released in 1984 at the height of breakdancing's popularity.
- Break Street is a computer game in which the player receives points for performing complex dance moves using the joystick without exhausting the player character's remaining energy. It was released for the Commodore 64 in October 1984 at the height of breakdancing's popularity.
- Dance Dance Revolution: Mario Mix has Mario and Luigi breakdancing to numerous songs – some based after the Super Mario series, and others based on real life. It released on October 24, 2005, on the Nintendo GameCube.
- B-boy is a 2006 console game released for PS2 and PSP which aims at an unadulterated depiction of breakdancing.
- Bust a Groove is a video game franchise whose character "Heat" specializes in breakdancing.
- Pump It Up is a Korean game that requires physical movement of the feet. The game involves breakdancing and people can accomplish this feat by memorizing the steps and creating dance moves to hit the arrows on time.
- Breakdance Champion Red Bull BC One is an iOS and Android rhythm game that focuses on the actual breakdancing competition Red Bull BC One.
- Floor Kids is a Nintendo Switch game released in 2017 that scores your performance based on its musicality, originality, and style. It received praise for its innovative controls and the Kid Koala soundtrack.
- In the long-running Yakuza video game franchise, Goro Majima's Breaker fighting style heavily relies on movements and techniques derived from break dancing.
