= Power move =

Type of breakdance moves

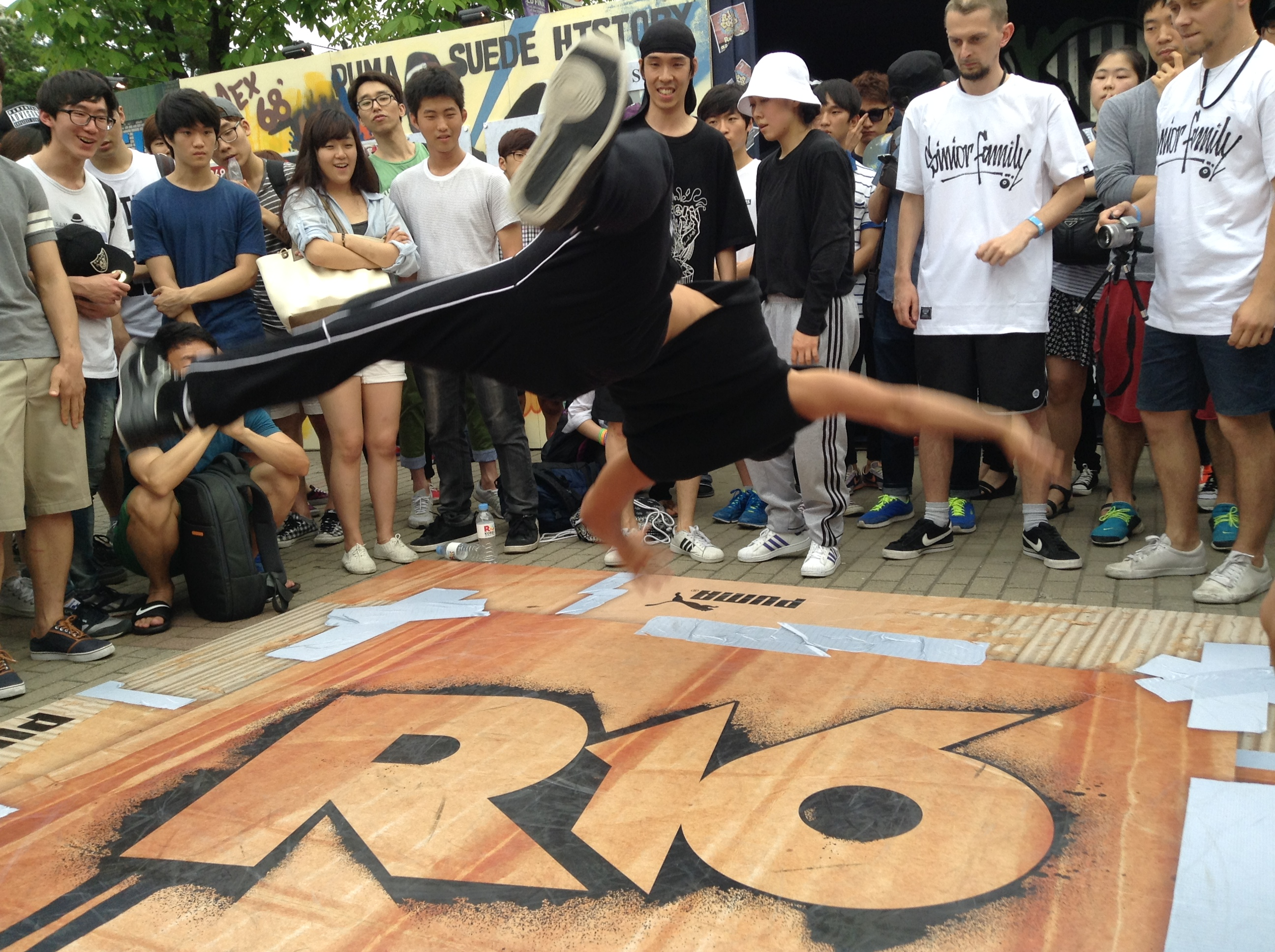
A b-boy doing an air flare at R16 in Seoul, South Korea

Power moves coined phrased after "Powerful Pexster" (Tony Lopez) from New York City Breakers are dance moves which are loosely defined as strength moves relying on speed, momentum, control and acrobatic elements for performance. They are prominent in B-boying, often the centerpieces of routines featuring the other elements (toprock, downrock, and freezes) that make up breaking. Power moves are closer to gymnastics than dancing. B-boys who focus heavily on power moves and execute them as a main part of their routines are often called "power heads".

== Types ==
- Spins
- Airflare
- Floats
- Swipes
- Flares
