= List of awards and nominations received by T-ara =

T-ara awards and nominations
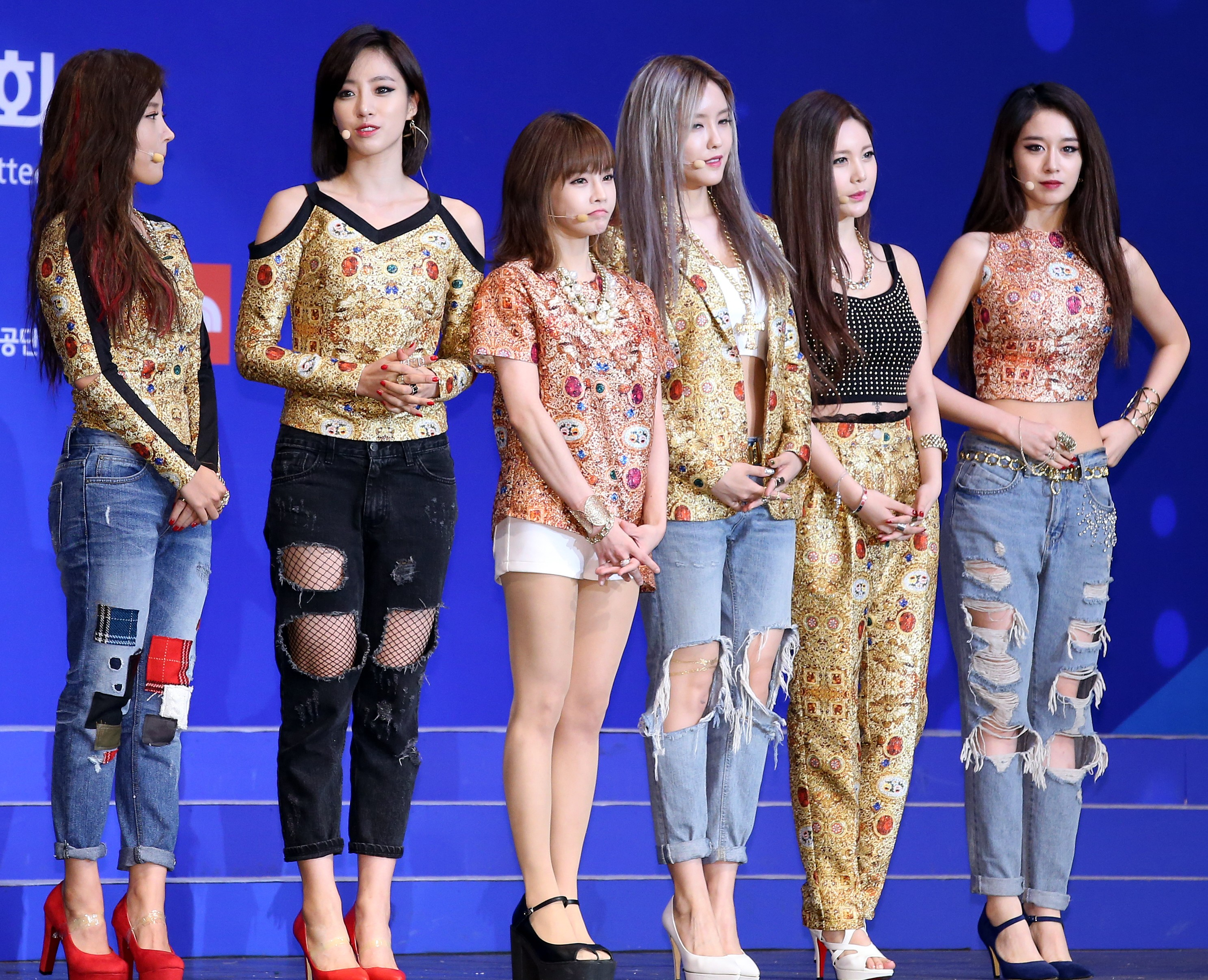
- T-ara in September 2014
Awards and nominations
Award	Wins	Nominations
Asia Artist Awards	0	3
Asia Jewelry Awards	1	1
Billboard Japan Music Awards	1	1
Bugs Music Awards	0	8
Cable TV Broadcasting Awards	1	1
Cyworld Digital Music Awards	2	2
Gaon Chart Music Awards	3	4
Global Chinese Music Awards	0	1
Golden Disc Awards	2	13
GQ KOREA Awards	2	2
Hallyu Center Awards	1	1
Hallyu Fans' Choice Awards	0	1
Hong Kong Youth Music Festival	1	1
Huading Awards	0	1
Japanese Music Awards	0	1
KBS Song Festival	0	3
Korean Culture Entertainment Award	1	1
Korean Popular Music Awards	0	1
KU Awards	2	2
Korean Tourism Organization	1	1
Luxury Brands Model Awards	1	1
Melon Music Awards	3	9
Mnet 20's Choice Awards	1	5
Mnet Asian Music Awards	0	11
MTN Festival	1	1
Mwave Global Awards	1	1
National Idol Singing Contest	1	1
SBS Awards Festival	2	2
SBS The Show Best Of The Best	1	1
Seoul Music Awards	3	13
Soribada Best K-Music Awards	1	2
Tower Records Awards	0	8
V Chart Awards	4	4
Yahoo! Asia Buzz Awards	0	3

Totals (Note: Certain award groups do not simply award one winner. They acknowledge several different recipients, have runners-up, and have third place. Since this is a specific recognition and is different from losing an award, runner-up mentions are considered wins in this award tally. For simplification and to avoid errors, each award in this list has been presumed to have had a prior nomination.)
- Wins: 44
- Nominations: 138

T-ara is a four-member South Korean girl group formed by Core Contents Media in 2009. Their debut studio album Absolute First Album (2009) included the hit singles "TTL (Time to Love)" and "Bo Peep Bo Peep". "Bo Peep Bo Peep" earned the group their first music show win on KBS's Music Bank. It was later awarded Triple Crown on SBS's Inkigayo and was nominated for Best Dance Performance by a Female Group at the 12th Mnet Asian Music Awards. The album was re-released as Breaking Heart in 2010 and included two further singles, "I Go Crazy Because of You" and "I'm Really Hurt". "I Go Crazy Because of You" claimed two consecutive wins on Inkigayo and one on Mnet's M Countdown. The repackage album was nominated for both a Disk Bonsang and Popularity Award at the 25th Golden Disk Awards. Temptastic (2010) was released later that year and included the singles "Wae Ireoni" and "yayaya" both receiving wins on M Countdown.

The group's second extended play John Travolta Wannabe (2011) had the lead single "Roly-Poly" which became the top grossing and most downloaded song of 2011 in South Korea. The video for "Roly-Poly" was awarded Best Music Video at the 3rd Melon Music Awards and the song was later nominated for Song of the Year and Best Dance Performance by a Female Group at the Mnet Asian Music Awards. Their 2011 release, Black Eyes, included "Cry Cry" which became their first number-one song on the Billboard Korea K-pop Hot 100 chart, charting at the #1 position for two weeks. T-ara came back with the repackaged version of Black Eyes in January 2012 with Funky Town, with the lead single "Lovey-Dovey". The song was critically acclaimed, debuting at number one on the Gaon Chart and becoming the group's second song to reach number-one on Billboard Korea's K-pop Hot 100 chart. Funky Town and "Lovey-Dovey" were nominated for multiple awards, including the Album Bonsang, Popularity Award, Digital Daesang, and the Digital Song Bonsang at the 2012 Golden Disc Awards, winning the latter. The song also won Song of the Year at the Gaon Chart Music Awards, the Main Prize Bonsang at the Seoul Music Awards, and gave the group a nomination for Best Female Group at the 2012 Mnet Asian Music Awards. "Lovey-Dovey" won a total of thirteen number one awards on various South Korean music shows: four on Music Bank, four on Music on Top, three on Inkigayo, and two on M! Countdown, becoming one of the group's most successful songs in Korea, alongside "Roly-Poly".

T-ara's fourth extended play Day by Day was released in July of 2012, with a lead single of the same name. "Day by Day" topped all Korean real-time charts within an hour of release and gave T-ara their sixth "all-kill". The song reached number two on the Gaon Weekly Digital Singles Chart and the Billboard Korea K-Pop Hot 100. The song ranked among the best selling singles of the year with nearly 2,150,000 copies sold in South Korea alone by the end of 2012. However, the song did not win any awards, presumably because promotions were cut short due to Ryu Hwa-young's withdrawal from T-ara. The group released the repackaged version of the extended play, Mirage, in September of the same year with the lead single "Sexy Love". The song was nominated for Best Female Group Dance at the KU Awards and won the This Year's Will award at the GQ Korea Awards. By the end of 2012, T-ara had been nominated for multiple year-end awards, winning awards such as Top Pop Artist at the Billboard Japan Music Awards and Best Idol Group at the Korean Culture & Entertainment Awards.

T-ara released their next Korean single, "Number Nine" in 2013, with the release of their fifth extended play Again. "Number Nine" reached number five on the Gaon Weekly Digital Chart and number 4 on Billboard's K-pop Hot 100. In China, the song topped YinYueTai's Korean and official charts. The song won Song of the Year at the 2013 KU Awards, with the group also winning Best Girl Group. In 2014, T-ara released their sixth extended play And & End with the lead single "Sugar Free". "Sugar Free" peaked at number 36 on Gaon's weekly chart and number 61 on its monthly chart. It debuted at number 4 on Billboard's Digital song sales chart, making it T-ara's highest-ranking song on the chart to date. "Sugar Free" was nominated for multiple awards, including the Main Prize Bonsang at the Seoul Music Awards. The song won Best Dance Video at the MTV Best of the Best Awards and Artists of the Year at the 3rd V Chart Awards. T-ara released "So Crazy" with the extended play So Good in 2015. The song provided T-ara with nominations for Favorite Artists Of the Year, Artists of the Year, and Group of the Year at the 4th V Chart Awards, winning the latter. By the end of 2014 and 2015, T-ara had won multiple awards, including China Most Popular Female Artist Award and Most Popular Artist In China at the SBS Awards Festival, and Best Girl Group at the KU Awards.

T-ara released their next lead single, "Tiamo", in 2016. In China, "Tiamo" topped both YinYueTai and Tudou's weekly charts. The song's success in the country contributed to T-ara being nominated for Artist of the Year and Group of the Year at the 5th V Chart Awards, where they won the latter. In 2017, T-ara released "What's My Name?", with an extended play of the same name. The song gave T-ara their first music show win since "Lovey-Dovey". The song was nominated for Mwave Global Fans' Choice at the Mnet Asian Music Awards and the Hallyu Popularity Award at the Soribada Best K-Music Awards, and won the Main Prize Bonsang at the Soribana Best K-Music Awards and the China Choice Award at the MTV Best of the Best Awards.

== Awards and nominations ==
Award ceremony	Year	Category	Nominee / work	Result	Ref.
Annual Home Shopping Awards	2010	Top 10 Songs	"Bo Peep Bo Peep"	Won	
Annual Home Shopping Awards	2011	Top 10 Songs	"Roly-Poly"	Won	
Annual Home Shopping Awards	2011	Top 10 Songs	"Beautiful Girl"	Won	
Annual Home Shopping Awards	2011	Top 10 Songs	"Log In"	Nominated	
Annual Home Shopping Awards	2012	Top 10 Songs	"Lovey-Dovey"	Won	
Annual Home Shopping Awards	2016	Top 10 Songs	"Bikini"	Nominated	
Asia Artist Awards	2016	Most Popular Artist – Singer	T-ara	Nominated	
Asia Artist Awards	2017	Most Popular Artist – Singer	T-ara	Nominated	
Asia Artist Awards	2018	Most Popular Artist – Singer	T-ara	Nominated	
Asia Jewelry Awards	2011	Diamond Award in Singing	T-ara	Won	
Billboard Japan Music Awards	2012	Top Pop Artist	T-ara	Won	
Bugs Music Awards	2009	New Artist of the Year	T-ara	Nominated	
Bugs Music Awards	2010	Female Group of the Year	T-ara	Nominated	
Bugs Music Awards	2010	Artist of the Year	T-ara	Nominated	
Bugs Music Awards	2010	Song of the Year	"Bo Peep Bo Peep"	Nominated	
Bugs Music Awards	2010	Music Video of the Year	"Bo Peep Bo Peep"	Nominated	
Bugs Music Awards	2010	Idol of the Year	T-ara	Nominated	
Bugs Music Awards	2011	Female Group of the Year	T-ara	Nominated	
Bugs Music Awards	2011	Song of the Year	"Roly-Poly"	Won	
Cable TV Broadcasting Awards	2011	Best Star Award	Dream Girls (TV Show)	Won	
Cyworld Digital Music Awards	2009	Rookie of the Month – August	"Lie"	Won	
Cyworld Digital Music Awards	2009	Ting's Choice Artist – September	"TTL (Time to Love)" (with Supernova)	Won	
Gaon Chart Awards	2010	Best Selling Ringtone	"Wonder Woman"	Won	
Gaon Chart Music Awards	2012	Song of the Year – July	"Roly-Poly"	Won	
Gaon Chart Music Awards	2013	Song of the Year – January	"Lovey-Dovey"	Won	
Gaon Chart Music Awards	2015	Weibo Star Award	T-ara	Nominated	
Global Chinese Music Awards	2012	Most popular Korean newcomer with Asian influence	T-ara	Nominated	
Golden Disc Awards	2009	Best New Artist	"Lie"	Won	
Golden Disc Awards	2010	Album Bonsang	Breaking Heart	Nominated	
Golden Disc Awards	2010	Popularity Award	Breaking Heart	Nominated	
Golden Disc Awards	2010	Digital Song Bonsang	"You Drive Me Crazy"	Nominated	
Golden Disc Awards	2010	Asia Popularity Award	"You Drive Me Crazy"	Nominated	
Golden Disc Awards	2013	Digital Song Bonsang	"Lovey-Dovey"	Won	
Golden Disc Awards	2013	Digital Daesang	"Lovey-Dovey"	Nominated	
Golden Disc Awards	2013	Album Bonsang	Funky Town	Nominated	
Golden Disc Awards	2013	Popularity Award	Funky Town	Nominated	
Golden Disc Awards	2013	MSN International Award	T-ara	Nominated	
Golden Disc Awards	2013	MSN Southeast Asian Award	T-ara	Nominated	
Golden Disc Awards	2013	Malaysia's Favourite Award	T-ara	Nominated	
Golden Disc Awards	2014	Album Bonsang	Again	Nominated	
Golden Disc Awards	2014	Popularity Award	Again	Nominated	
Golden Disc Awards	2016	Jiangsu Popularity Award	T-ara	Nominated	
GQ Korea Awards	2012	This Year's Will	"Sexy Love"	Won	
GQ Korea Awards	2014	This Year's Will	"Sugar Free"	Won	
GSL Tour Awards	2011	Best Girl Group	T-ara	Won	
Hallyu Center Awards	2015	Hallyu Envoy Award	T-ara	Won	
Hong Kong Youth Music Festival	2015	Asia Idol Award	T-ara	Won	
Huading Awards	2016	Best Group - Global	T-ara	Nominated	
Innolife Japan Awards	2011	Best Girl Group	T-ara	Nominated	
Innolife Japan Awards	2012	Best Girl Group	T-ara	Nominated	
Japanese Music Awards	2013	Best Girl Group	T-ara	Nominated	
KBS Music Festival	2010	Song of the Year	"Bo Peep Bo Peep"	Nominated	
KBS Music Festival	2011	Idol of 2011	T-ara	Nominated	
KBS Music Festival	2011	Song of the Year	"Roly-Poly"	Nominated	
Korean Culture & Entertainment Awards	2012	Best Idol Group	T-ara	Won	
Korean Popular Music Awards	2012	Best Dance & Electronic Song	"Roly-Poly"	Nominated	
KU Awards	2010	Best Girl Group	T-ara	Nominated	
KU Awards	2011	Dance of The Year	"Roly-Poly"	Nominated	
KU Awards	2011	Best Girl Group	T-ara	Nominated	
KU Awards	2012	Best Female Group Dance	"Sexy Love"	Nominated	
KU Awards	2012	News of The Year	T-ara	Won	
KU Awards	2012	Best Girl Group	T-ara	Nominated	
KU Awards	2013	Song of The Year	"Number 9"	Won	
KU Awards	2013	Best Girl Group	T-ara	Won	
KU Awards	2014	Comeback of The Year	"Sugar Free"	Won	
KU Awards	2014	Song of The Year	"Sugar Free"	Nominated	
KU Awards	2014	Best Girl Group	T-ara	Won	
KU Awards	2014	Album of The Year	And & End	Nominated	
KU Awards	2015	Best Girl Group	T-ara	Won	
Luxury Brand Model Awards	2016	Top Hallyu Girl Group	T-ara	Won	
Melon Music Awards	2009	Song of the Year (Daesang)	"Women's Generation" (with SeeYa & Davichi)	Nominated	
Melon Music Awards	2009	Mobile Music Award	"Women's Generation" (with SeeYa & Davichi)	Nominated	
Melon Music Awards	2009	Current Stream Award	"TTL (Time to Love)" (with Supernova)	Nominated	
Melon Music Awards	2010	Top 10 Award (Bonsang)	T-ara	Won	
Melon Music Awards	2011	Best Music Video	"Roly-Poly"	Won	
Melon Music Awards	2011	Song of the Year	"Roly-Poly"	Nominated	
Melon Music Awards	2011	Top 10 Award (Bonsang)	T-ara	Nominated	
Melon Music Awards	2012	Top 10 Award (Bonsang)	T-ara	Won	
Melon Music Awards	2012	Global Artist Award	T-ara	Nominated	
Mnet 20's Choice Awards	2010	Most Influential Star	T-ara	Won	
Mnet 20's Choice Awards	2011	Hot Balance Star	T-ara	Nominated	
Mnet 20's Choice Awards	2011	20's Online Music	"Roly-Poly"	Nominated	
Mnet 20's Choice Awards	2012	20's Online Music	"Lovey-Dovey"	Nominated	
Mnet Asian Music Awards	2009	Best New Female Artist	"Lie"	Nominated	
Mnet Asian Music Awards	2009	Music Portal Mnet Award	T-ara	Nominated	
Mnet Asian Music Awards	2009	Singer of the Year	T-ara	Nominated	
Mnet Asian Music Awards	2010	Best Female Group	"Bo Peep Bo Peep"	Nominated	
Mnet Asian Music Awards	2010	Best Dance Performance – Female Group	"Bo Peep Bo Peep"	Nominated	
Mnet Asian Music Awards	2011	Best Dance Performance – Female Group	"Roly-Poly"	Nominated	
Mnet Asian Music Awards	2011	Song of the Year	"Roly-Poly"	Nominated	
Mnet Asian Music Awards	2012	Best Female Group	"Lovey-Dovey"	Nominated	
Mnet Asian Music Awards	2012	Best Collaboration	"We Were in Love" (with Davichi)	Nominated	
Mnet Asian Music Awards	2012	Artist of the Year	T-ara	Nominated	
Mnet Asian Music Awards	2017	Mwave Global Fans' Choice	"What's My Name?"	Nominated	
MTN Broadcasting Advertising Festival	2011	Best Commercial Model of the Year	T-ara	Won	
MTV Best of the Best Awards	2011	Best Music Video	"Roly-Poly"	Nominated	
MTV Best of the Best Awards	2011	Best Female Group	T-ara	Nominated	
MTV Best of the Best Awards	2011	Best Live	T-ara	Nominated	
MTV Best of the Best Awards	2011	Best Global Star	T-ara	Nominated	
MTV Best of the Best Awards	2014	Best Dance Video	"Sugar Free"	Won	
Mwave Global Awards	2014	K-Pop Star World Championship	T-ara	Won	
National Idol Singing Contest	2015	Hangawi Award	T-ara	Won	
SBS Awards Festival	2014	Most Popular Artist In China	T-ara	Won	
SBS Awards Festival	2015	China Most Popular Female Artist Award	T-ara	Won	
SBS The Show Best of the Best	2017	China Choice Award	T-ara	Won	
Seoul Music Awards	2010	Best New Artist	T-ara	Won	
Seoul Music Awards	2011	Popularity Award	T-ara	Nominated	
Seoul Music Awards	2011	Main Prize (Bonsang)	"You Drive Me Crazy"	Nominated	
Seoul Music Awards	2012	Best Song	"Roly-Poly"	Won	
Seoul Music Awards	2012	Popularity Award	T-ara	Nominated	
Seoul Music Awards	2012	Main Prize (Bonsang)	"Roly-Poly"	Won	
Seoul Music Awards	2013	Popularity Award	T-ara	Nominated	
Seoul Music Awards	2013	Main Prize (Bonsang)	"Lovey Dovey"	Won	
Seoul Music Awards	2015	Hallyu Special Award	T-ara	Nominated	
Seoul Music Awards	2015	Main Prize (Bonsang)	"Sugar Free"	Nominated	
Seoul Music Awards	2015	Popularity Award	T-ara	Nominated	
Seoul Music Awards	2020	Legend Rookie Award	T-ara	Nominated	
Soribada Best K-Music Awards	2017	Main Prize (Bonsang)	What's My Name?	Won	
Soribada Best K-Music Awards	2017	New Hallyu Popularity Award	What's My Name?	Nominated	
Tower Records Awards	2011	Single of the Year	"Bo Peep Bo Peep" (JPN Ver.)	Nominated	
Tower Records Awards	2012	Album of the Year	Jewelry Box	Nominated	
Tower Records Awards	2012	Artist of the Year	T-ara	Nominated	
Tower Records Awards	2013	Single of the Year	"Bunny Style"	Nominated	
Tower Records Awards	2013	Artist of the Year	T-ara	Nominated	
V Chart Awards	2013	Favorite Artists Of the Year	T-ara	Nominated	
V Chart Awards	2014	Favorite Artists Of the Year	T-ara	Nominated	
V Chart Awards	2015	Favorite Artists Of the Year	T-ara	Won	
V Chart Awards	2015	Artists of the Year	"Sugar Free"	Won	
V Chart Awards	2015	Group of the Year	"Sugar Free"	Nominated	
V Chart Awards	2016	Artists of the Year	"So Crazy"	Nominated	
V Chart Awards	2016	Group of the Year	"So Crazy"	Won	
V Chart Awards	2016	Favorite Artists of the Year	T-ara	Nominated	
V Chart Awards	2017	Group of The Year	"Tiamo"	Won	
V Chart Awards	2017	Favorite Artists of the Year	T-ara	Nominated	
Yahoo! Asia Buzz Awards	2009	Korean Buzz Star	T-ara	Nominated	
Yahoo! Asia Buzz Awards	2010	Korean Buzz Star	T-ara	Nominated	
Yahoo! Asia Buzz Awards	2011	Korean Buzz Star	T-ara	Nominated	

== Other accolades ==
=== Recognitions ===
Year	Country	From	Honor	Ref.
2011	South Korea	Gyeonggi Functional Game Festival	Honorary ambassador appreciation plaque	
2011	South Korea	Korea National Tax Service	Honorary Head of Civil Service Department Plaque	
2011	South Korea	National Sharing Movement	Appreciation Plaque	
2011	South Korea	Senator Na Kyung-won	Honorary Advisers	
2013	South Korea	Korea Tourism Organization	Plaque of Appreciation	

=== Listicles ===
Name of publisher, year listed, name of listicle, and placement
Publisher	Year	List	Ranking	Ref.
Naver	2010	Most searched Terms in 2010	7th	
Soribada	2010	Most searched Artists in 2010	3rd	
Daum	2012	Most searched Terms of 2012	5th	
Forbes Korea	2012	Korea Power Celebrity	17th	
Forbes Korea	2013	Korea Power Celebrity	22nd	
Forbes China	2017	Global Idol Chinese Popularity Ranking	2nd	
Sao Star	2020	K-Pop Groups With The Best Concepts	3rd	
Rolling Stone	2023	The 100 Best Korean Pop Songs of All Time ("Bo Peep Bo Peep")	45th	
GQ France	2024	21 K-Pop Groups Taking the Internet by Storm	Placed	
