= T-ara's Best of Best 2009–2012: Korean ver. =

Greatest hits album by T-ara
- Released: October 10, 2012
- Recorded: 2009–12
- Genre: Dance-pop, electropop
- Label: EMI Music Japan

T-ara Japanese chronology
Day by Day (2012)	T-ara's Best of Best 2009–2012: Korean ver. (2012)	Treasure Box (2013)

T-ara's Best of Best 2009–2012: Korean ver. (stylized as T-ARA's Best of Best 2009-2012 ～KOREAN ver.～) is the first greatest hits album by South Korean girl group T-ara. It was released on October 10, 2012 by EMI Music Japan to commemorate the one-year anniversary of the group's Japanese debut. The album was released with both separate Korean and Japanese versions, which each contain all of T-ara's singles from Absolute First Album (2009) up to Funky Town (2012), including their 2010 FIFA World Cup digital single "We Are the One". A limited ultra-deluxe edition of the album, which includes a 72-page photobook and 120-minute documentary of T-ara's "Free Time in Europe" trip, was released on October 17, 2012.

== Track listing ==
All editions:
No.	Title	Lyrics	Producer(s)	Length
1.	"Bo Peep Bo Peep"	Shinsadong Tiger, Choi Kyu-sung	Shinsadong Tiger, Choi Kyu-sung
2.	"Lies" (嘘)	Ahn Young-min	Cho Young-soo
3.	"TTL (Time to Love)"	Hwang Sung-jin, Rhymer, Joosuc	Kim Do-hoon
4.	"TTL Listen 2"	Rhymer, Sangchu	Kim Do-hoon, Rhymer
5.	"I Go Crazy Because of You" (あなたのせいで狂いそう)	Wheesung	Cho, Kim Tae-hyun
6.	"Yayaya"	E-Tribe	E-Tribe
7.	"Wae Ireoni" (ウェイロニ)	Lee Eun-jin	Kim Do-hoon, Lee Sang-ho
8.	"I'm Really Hurt" (私がとても痛くて)	Shinsadong Tiger, Choi	Shinsadong Tiger, Choi
9.	"We Are the One"	Ahn	Cho, Kim Tae-hyun
10.	"Like The First Time" (初めてのように)	"hitman" bang	"hitman" bang
11.	"Roly-Poly"	Shinsadong Tiger, Choi	Shinsadong Tiger, Choi
12.	"Roly-Poly in Copacabana" (コパカバーナ)	Shinsadong Tiger, Choi	Shinsadong Tiger, Choi
13.	"Cry Cry"	Kim Tae-hyun, Cho, Ahn	Kim Tae-hyun, Ahn
14.	"Lovey-Dovey"	Shinsadong Tiger, Choi	Shinsadong Tiger, Choi

DVD:
No.	Title	Length
1.	"Bo Peep Bo Peep" (Sexy ver.)
2.	"Bo Peep Bo Peep" (Dance ver.)
3.	"Uso"
4.	"TTL (Time To Love)"
5.	"TTL Listen 2"
6.	"Anata no Sei de Kurui Sou"
7.	"Yayaya"
8.	"Wae Ireoni (Doushite Souna no)"
9.	"Watashi ga Totemo Itakute"
10.	"We Are the One"
11.	"Hajimete no You ni"
12.	"Roly-Poly" (ver.1)
13.	"Roly-Poly" (ver.2)
14.	"Roly-Poly in Copacabana"

Ultra-deluxe edition DVD:
No.	Title	Length
1.	"Free Time in Europe documentary"	120:00

== Charts ==
=== Oricon ===
Released	Oricon chart	Peak	Debut sales	Sales total
October 10, 2012	Daily albums chart	8	6,585 (Weekly); 15,678 (Monthly)	17,491+
October 10, 2012	Weekly albums chart	14	6,585 (Weekly); 15,678 (Monthly)	17,491+
October 10, 2012	Monthly albums chart	31	6,585 (Weekly); 15,678 (Monthly)	17,491+

== Release history ==
Region	Date	Label	Format	Catalog
Japan	October 10, 2012	EMI Music Japan	CD	TOCT-29085
Japan	October 10, 2012	EMI Music Japan	CD+DVD	TOCT-29084
Japan	October 17, 2012	EMI Music Japan	CD+Photobook+DVD	TOCT-29090
