= John Travolta Wannabe =

- Official cover for purchase and streaming versions. The rental version in Japan has square shape.

EP by T-ara
- Released: June 29, 2011
- Recorded: 2011
- Genre: Pop; dance-pop; electropop
- Length: 25:33; 29:09 (Repackage)
- Label: Core Contents
- Producer: Shinsadong Horaengi

T-ara chronology
Temptastic (2010)	John Travolta Wannabe (2011)	Black Eyes (2011)

Singles from John Travolta Wannabe
- 1. "Roly-Poly" Released: June 29, 2011

Alternative cover
- Roly-Poly in Copacabana re-release cover

Singles from Roly-Poly in Copacabana
- 1. "Roly-Poly in Copacabana" Released: August 2, 2011

John Travolta Wannabe is the second extended play by South Korean girl group T-ara. The EP's repackage edition is called Roly-Poly in Copacabana and it was released as a limited edition on August 2, 2011.

== Background and release ==
It was announced on June 8, 2011, that T-ara would make a comeback in July with John Travolta Wannabe. It was also revealed that the lead single was composed by Shinsadong Tiger and Choi Gyu Sung, who had previously worked with T-ara on songs like "Bo Peep Bo Peep". T-ara came up with the concept themselves after watching Saturday Night Fever.

On June 24, Core Contents Media released a 59-second teaser of T-ara's title track "Roly-Poly". The video was released three days earlier than originally scheduled, due to the request of fans. The full 12.5-minute music video was released on June 28. Musically, "Roly-Poly" was considered a remake of the Bee Gees' "Night Fever", and the video's choreography was called reminiscent of Saturday Night Fever, which starred John Travolta.

== Commercial performance ==
In August 2011, "Roly-Poly" had become the top-grossing song of the year until that point with over $2 million in sales. On the Gaon Yearly 2011 Download chart, "Roly-Poly" was the best-selling song in South Korea with over 4,077,885 downloads.

Both albums charted on the Gaon Yearly 2011 Album chart, with John Travolta Wannabe selling 30,116 copies and the repackage Roly Poly in Copacabana sold 24,179 copies.

== Re-release ==
On August 1, Core Contents Media announced that a repackage of John Travolta Wannabe would be titled Roly-Poly in Copacabana and limited to only 10,000 copies. The repackage contains one new song, a Eurodance remix of "Roly-Poly" titled "Roly-Poly in Copacabana", which was named after the famous 1980s disco club. The song premiered on August 2 while the music video was delayed until the next day. The revealing of "Roly-Poly in Copacabana" was pushed up an hour than originally planned, due to the urging of fans.

== Track listing ==
John Travolta Wannabe track listing
No.	Title	Lyrics	Music	Arrangement	Length
1.	"Roly-Poly"	Shinsadong Tiger, Choi Gyu Sung	Shinsadong Tiger, Choi Gyu Sung	Shinsadong Tiger, Choi Gyu Sung	3:34
2.	"I Really Really Like You" (진짜 진짜 좋아해; Jinjja Jinjja Joahae)	Nang-ee, Beom-ee	Nang-ee, Beom-ee	Nang-ee, Beom-ee	3:27
3.	"Yayaya" (Remix ver.)	E-Tribe	E-Tribe	E-Tribe, Chang Jun Ho	3:33
4.	"Why Are You Being Like This?" (왜 이러니; Wae Ireoni) (Remix ver.)	Lee Eun Jin (Yangpa)	Kim Do Hoon, Lee Sang Ho	Lee Sang Ho	3:49
5.	"Ma Boo" (Remix ver.)	Kim Do Hoon, Rhymer	Kim Do Hoon	Kim Do Hoon	3:29
6.	"I Don't Know" (몰라요; Mollayo) (Remix ver.)	Shinsadong Tiger, Choi Gyu Sung	Shinsadong Tiger, Choi Gyu Sung	Shinsadong Tiger, Choi Gyu Sung	3:47
7.	"I'm Okay" (괜찮아요; Gwaenchanhayo) (Remix ver.)	Choi Gyu Sung	Choi Gyu Sung	Choi Gyu Sung	3:59
Total length:					25:33

=== Roly-Poly in Copacabana ===
No.	Title	Length
1.	"Roly-Poly in Copacabana" (Roly-Poly in 코파카바나)	3:29
Total length:		29:09

== Charts ==
=== Weekly charts ===
Chart	Peak position
South Korean Albums (Gaon)	3
South Korean Albums (Gaon) Roly Poly in Copacabana	3

=== Monthly charts ===
Chart	Peak position
South Korean Albums (Gaon)	8
South Korean Albums (Gaon) Roly Poly in Copacabana	4

=== Year-end charts ===
Chart	Position
South Korean Albums (Gaon)	52
South Korean Albums (Gaon) Roly Poly in Copacabana	67

== Sales ==
Physical sales
Country	Sales	Ref.
South Korea (Gaon)	67,000	
Japan (Oricon)	10,771	

== Accolades ==
=== Awards and nominations ===
Award ceremony	Year	Category	Nominee / work	Result	Ref.
Soompi Awards	2011	Mini Album of the Year	John Travolta Wannbe	Nominated	

=== Rankings ===
Year	Publication	List	Rank	Ref.
2013	Complex	The Best K-Pop Album Covers of All Time	15	

== Release history ==
Country	Date	Format	Label
Various	June 29, 2011	Digital download	Core Contents Media; LOEN Entertainment
South Korea	June 29, 2011	Digital download	Core Contents Media; LOEN Entertainment
South Korea	June 30, 2011	CD	Core Contents Media; LOEN Entertainment
South Korea	August 22, 2011	CD (Repackage)	Core Contents Media; LOEN Entertainment
