= 2010 Melon Music Awards =

2010 South Korean music award ceremony

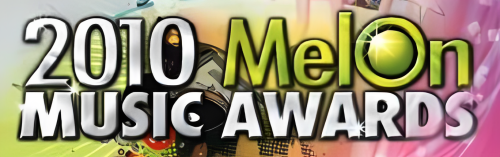
- Date: Wednesday, December 15, 2010
- Location: Hall of Peace, Kyung Hee University
- Country: South Korea
- Hosted by: Song Joong-ki

Highlights
- Most awards: Girls' Generation (4)
- Most nominations: Girls' Generation (8)
- Album of the Year: To Anyone
- Artist of the Year: Girls' Generation
- Song of the Year: "Can't Let You Go Even If I Die"
- Website: Melon Music Awards website

Television/radio coverage
- Network: MelOn, MBC every1, MBC Dramanet, MBC Game & MBC Life (South Korea); Afreeca TV & GOM TV (Worldwide)

The 2010 Melon Music Awards were held on Wednesday, December 15, 2010, at the Hall of Peace of Kyung Hee University in Seoul, South Korea. Organized by Kakao M through its online music store Melon, the 2010 ceremony was the second installment of the event. The winners for the Top 10 Bonsang Award were announced prior to the ceremony.

== Performers ==
List of performances at 2010 Melon Music Awards
Artist(s) (Note: Order is arranged in alphabetical order)	Song(s)
2AM	"Can't Let You Go Even If I Die" / "You Wouldn't Answer My Calls"
2NE1	"Can't Nobody" / "Go Away"
2PM	"Without U"
4Men	"Silent Night, Holy Night" (a cappella) / "I Can't"
CNBLUE	"I'm a Loner" / "Love"
DJ DOC	"I'm This Type of Person" / "Run To Me"
Girls' Generation	"Hoot" / "Oh!"
Gummy	"I Love You Even If I Die" / "Because You’re a Man"
IU	"Good Day" / "Nagging"
Jang Yoon-jeong	"Olle" (Christmas Remix)
Jungyup	"Without You"
Lee Seung-gi	My Girlfriend Is a Gumiho OST Medley
Psy	"Champion" / "Right Now"
T-ara	"You Drive Me Crazy" / "Why Are You Being Like This?" / "Yayaya"

== Presenters ==
- Song Joong-ki – Official host
- Lee Soo-hyuk & Kim Jung-hwa – Top 10 Award For 2NE1, CNBLUE & DJ DOC
- Lee Ju-han & Kim Min-seo – Best Alternative Rock & Best R&B
- Seo Kang-joo (Note: Representative of MBC Plus Media.) & Moon Ji-ye – MBC Plus Artist Award & MBC Radio Artist Award
- Lee Kan & Choi Ah-ra – Top 10 Award For 4men & Girls Generation (Note: Before introducing the award, Miss A Came to Accept the Last award that they didn't get last time due to them being a little late.)
- Kim Gi-deuk – Album of the Year
- Han Seong-jin & Jung So-ra – Best Music Video, Best Trot & Best Rap / Hip Hop
- Park Ki-woong & Yoon Song-i – Top 10 Award For IU, 2AM & Lee Seung-gi
- Kim Jung-man – Culture Performer Award
- Julien Kang & Min Hye-kyung – Top 10 Award For T-ara & 2PM
- Choi Phillip & Kim Bin-woo – Hot Trend Award & Best OST
- Danny Ahn & Oh Se-jeong – Best Songwriter Award & Netizen Popularity Award
- Jo Yeon-woo & Yoon Ji-min – Best New Artist & Song of the Year
- Park So-hyang & Choi Eun-kyeong – Artist of the Year

== Winners and nominees ==
=== Main awards ===
Winners and nominees are listed below. Winners are listed first and emphasized in bold.

Top 10 Artist (Bonsang)	Album of the Year (Daesang)
**2NE1**; **CNBLUE**; **DJ DOC**; **4Men**; **Girls' Generation**; **IU**; **2AM**; **Lee Seung-gi**; **T-ara**; **2PM**	**2NE1 – To Anyone**; Girls' Generation – Oh!; 2AM – Can't Let You Go Even If I Die; DJ DOC – Pungnyu; 4Men – The Third Generation
Artist of the Year (Daesang)	Song of the Year (Daesang)
**Girls' Generation**; IU; 2NE1; CNBLUE; 2AM	**2AM – "Can't Let You Go Even If I Die"**; Girls' Generation – "Oh!"; 2NE1 – "Go Away"; Lee Seung-gi – "Love Taught Me To Drink"; CNBLUE – "I'm a Loner"
Best New Artist	Best Music Video
**CNBLUE**; Beast; Miss A; Secret; Sistar	**Gain – "Irreversible" (Dir. Hwang Soo-ah)**; Rain – "Love Song" (Dir. Lee Sung-kyu); Girls' Generation – "Hoot" (Dir. Jang Jae-hyuk); Kara – "Lupin" (Dir. Seo Hyun-seung); Miss A – "Bad Girl Good Girl" (Dir. Hong Won-ki)
Best Rap/Hip Hop Award	Best Alternative Rock Award
**Supreme Team – "Dang Dang Dang"**; Untouchable – "Living in my Heart" (가슴에살아) (Feat. Narsha of Brown Eyed Girls); Cho PD – "Given Advice" (ft. Jeong Seul-gi); DJ DOC – "Unsent Letter" (부치지 못한 편지); T.O.P – "Turn It Up"	**Hot Potato – "Confession (고백)"**; 10cm – "Americano" (아메리카노); Lee Juck – "And You (그대랑)"; Taru – "In Love with Strawberry (사랑에 빠진 딸기)"; TraxX – "Oh! My Goddess" (오! 나의 여신님)
Best Ballad Award	Best Trot Award
**Gummy – "Like a Man" (남자라서)**; Brown Eyed Soul – "Love Ballad"; Big Mama – "Wait Like Crazy" (기다리다 미쳐); Jeong In – "Hate You" (미워요); Hwayobi – "Bye Bye Bye"	**Jang Yoon-jeong – "Come On"**; Norazo – "Pot" (꿀단지); Park Hyun-bin – "Ah! Hot" (앗! 뜨거); Hong Jin-young – "My Love"; LPG – "Love Door Bell" (사랑의 초인종)
Best OST Award	Netizen Popularity Award
**Lee Seung-gi – "Losing My Mind" (My Girlfriend Is a Gumiho)**; SeeYa – "My Heart is Pounding" (Personal Taste); Yesung – "It Must Have Been You" (Cinderella's Stepsister); Lee Seung-chul – "That Person" (Bread, Love and Dreams); Yim Jae-beom – "Stigma" (Sign)	**Super Junior – "Bonamana"**; Jo Kwon & Gain – "I Happen to Love You"; Girls' Generation – "Hoot"; 2PM – "Heartbeat"; Shinee – "Lucifer"
Hot Trend Award
**Girls' Generation – "Hoot"**; Gain – "Irreversible"; Huh Gak – "Always"; 2AM – "You Wouldn't Answer My Calls"; 2NE1 – "Go Away"

=== Other awards ===
Nominees	Winners
Songwriter Award	Lee Min-soo & Kim Eana
Best Dressed Singer	Girls' Generation
Best MBC Radio Singer Award	Jungyup
Best MBC Plus Star Award	Miss A
Culture Performer Award	Psy

== Gallery ==
2010 Melon Music Awards gallery
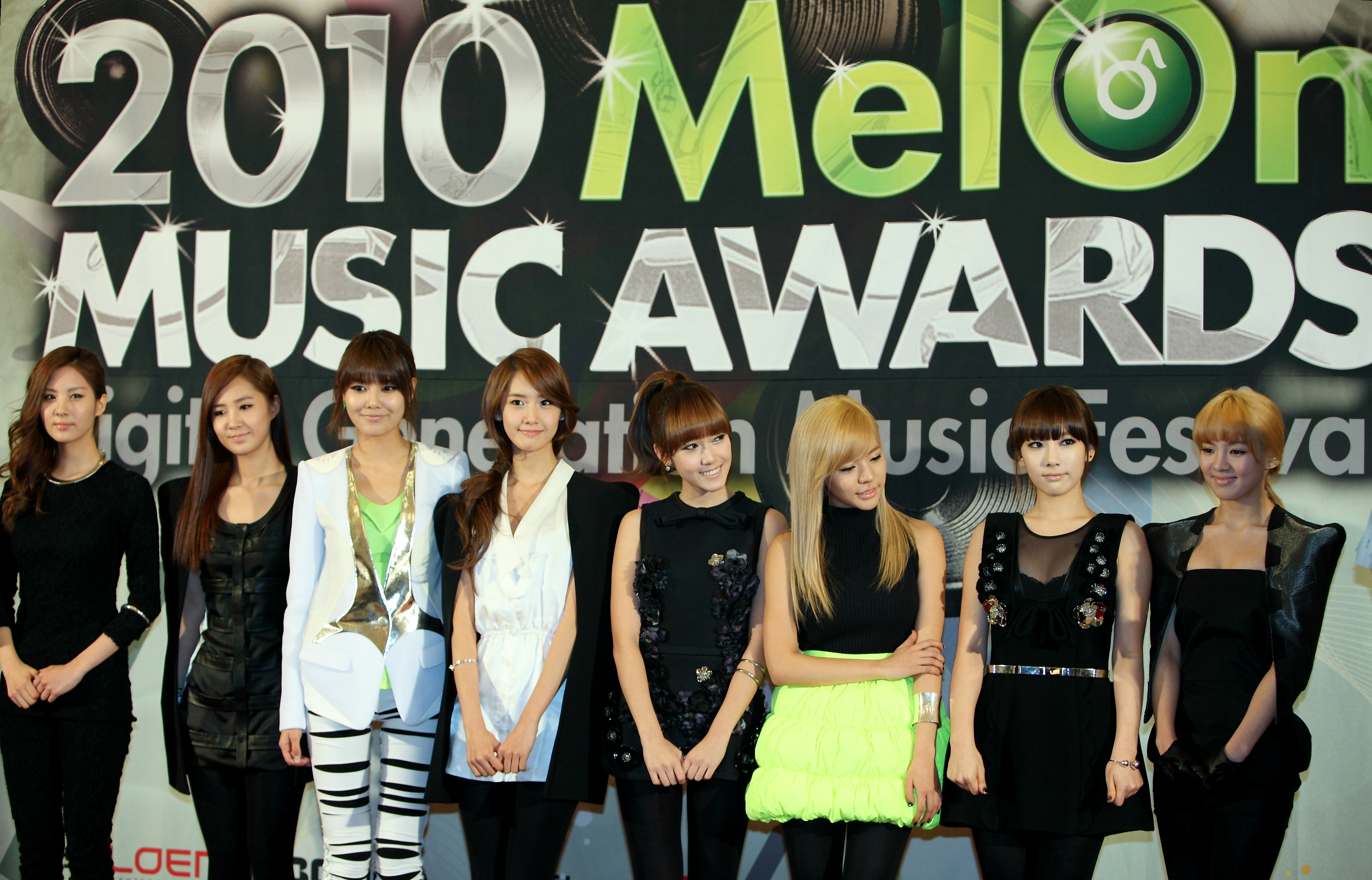
Girls' Generation won 4 awards

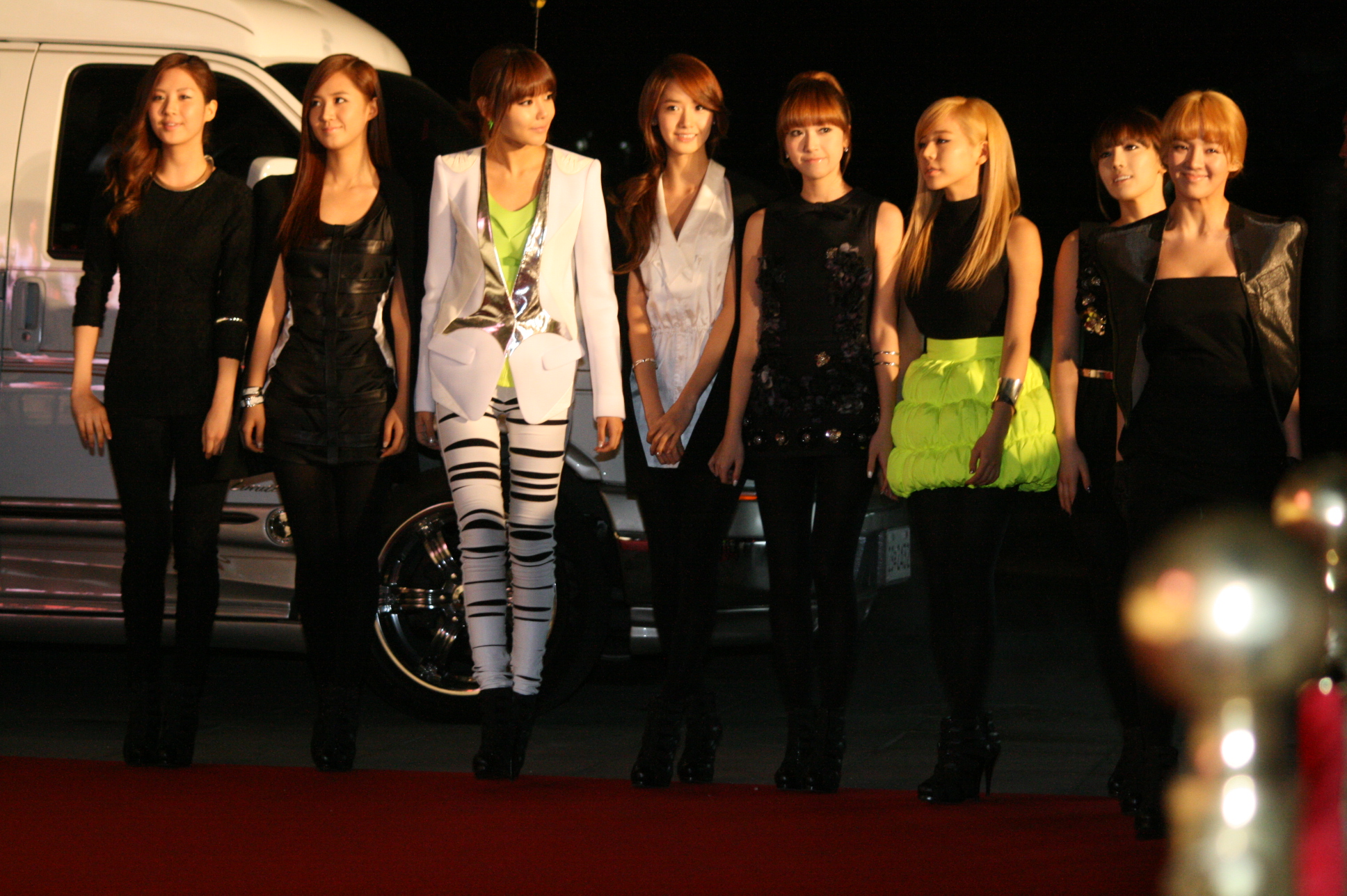
Girls' Generation entering the red carpet

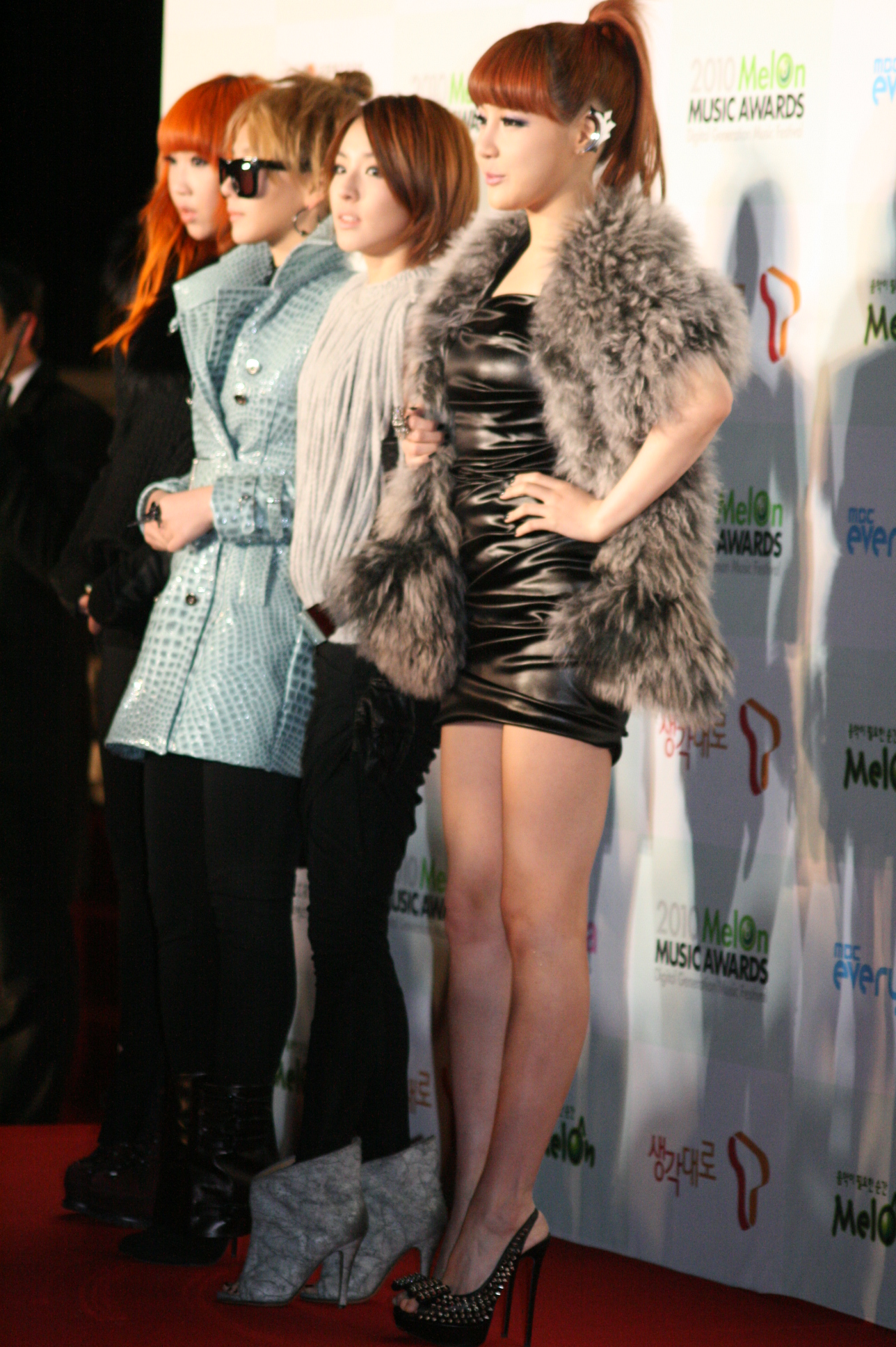
2NE1 won 2 awards

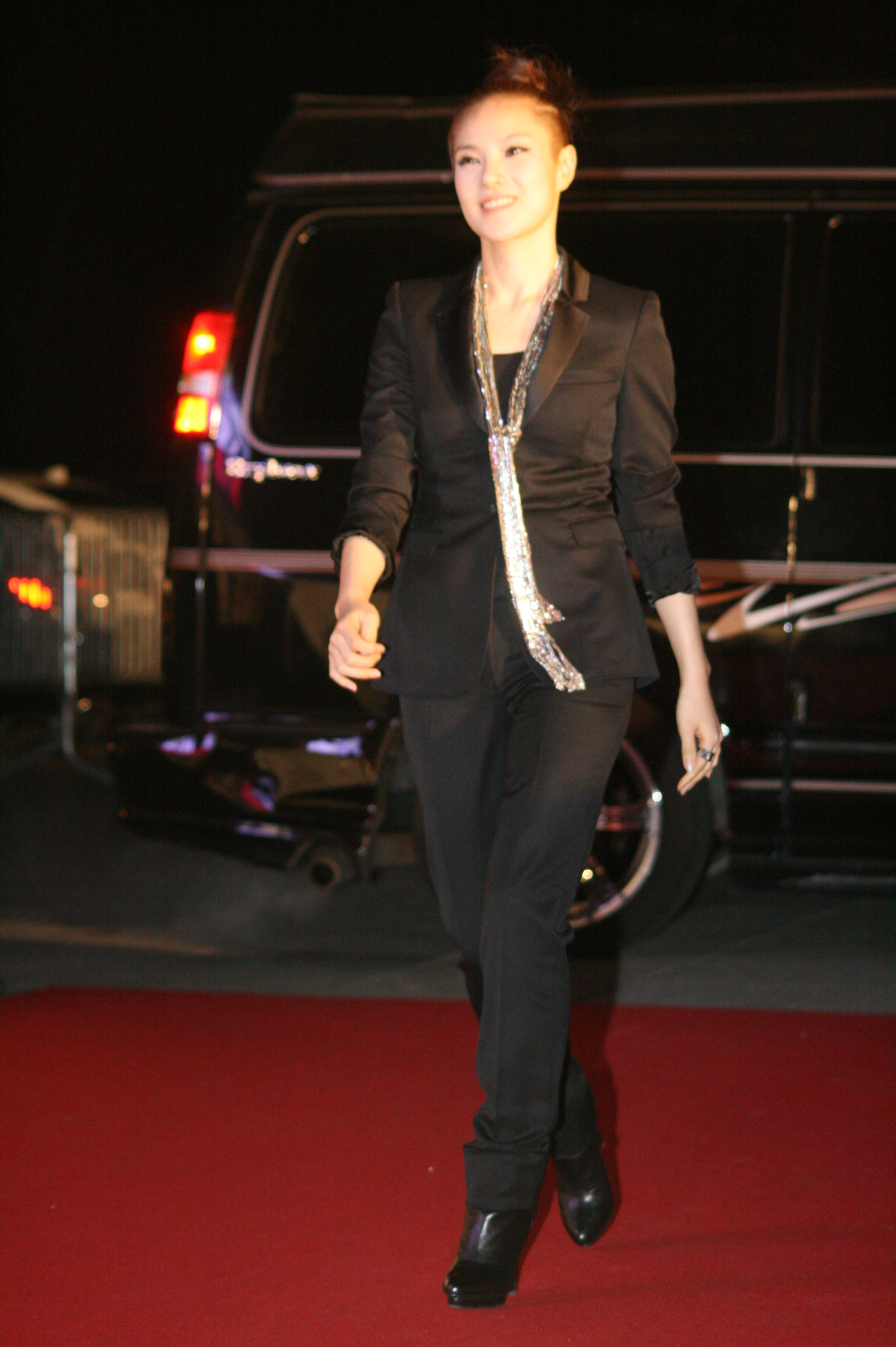
Gummy won 1 award

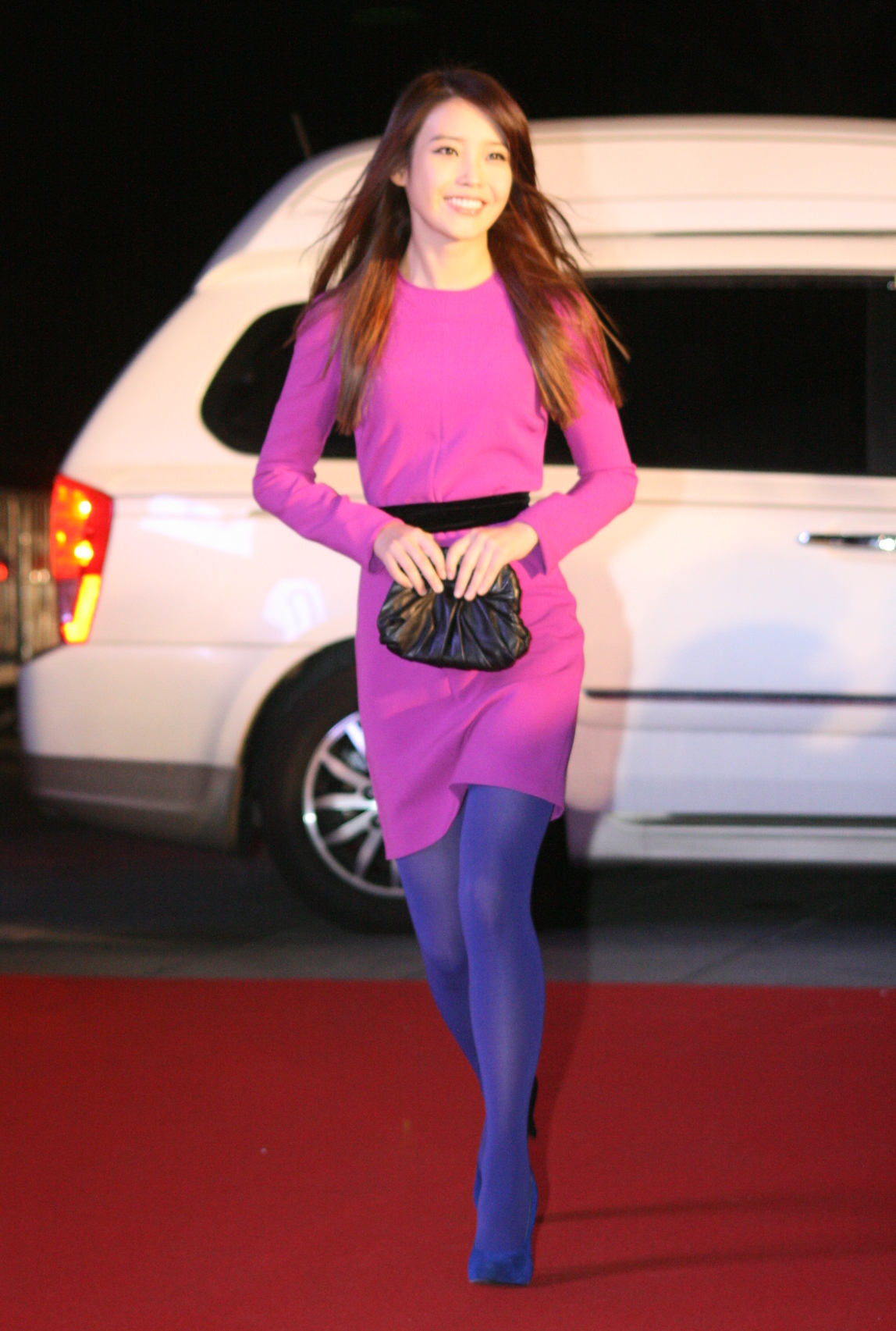
IU walking the red carpet

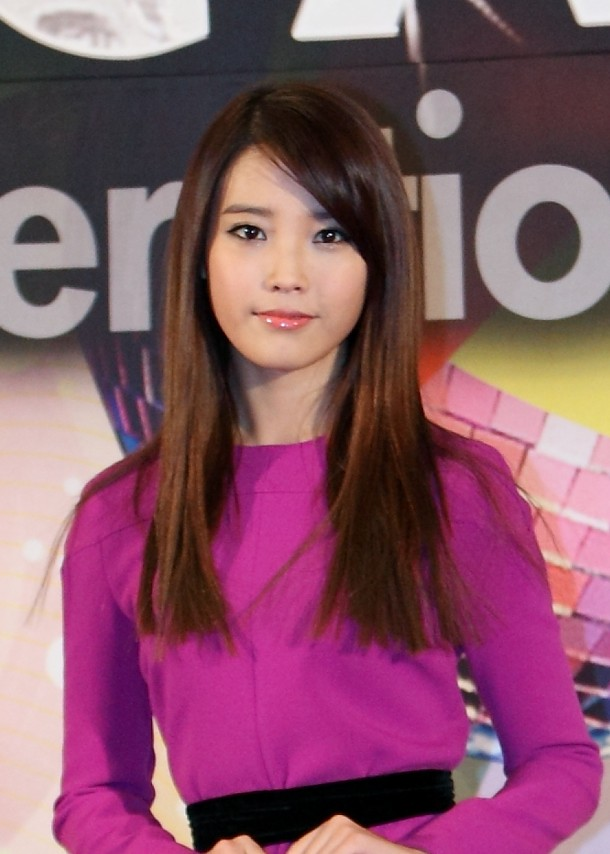
IU won 1 award

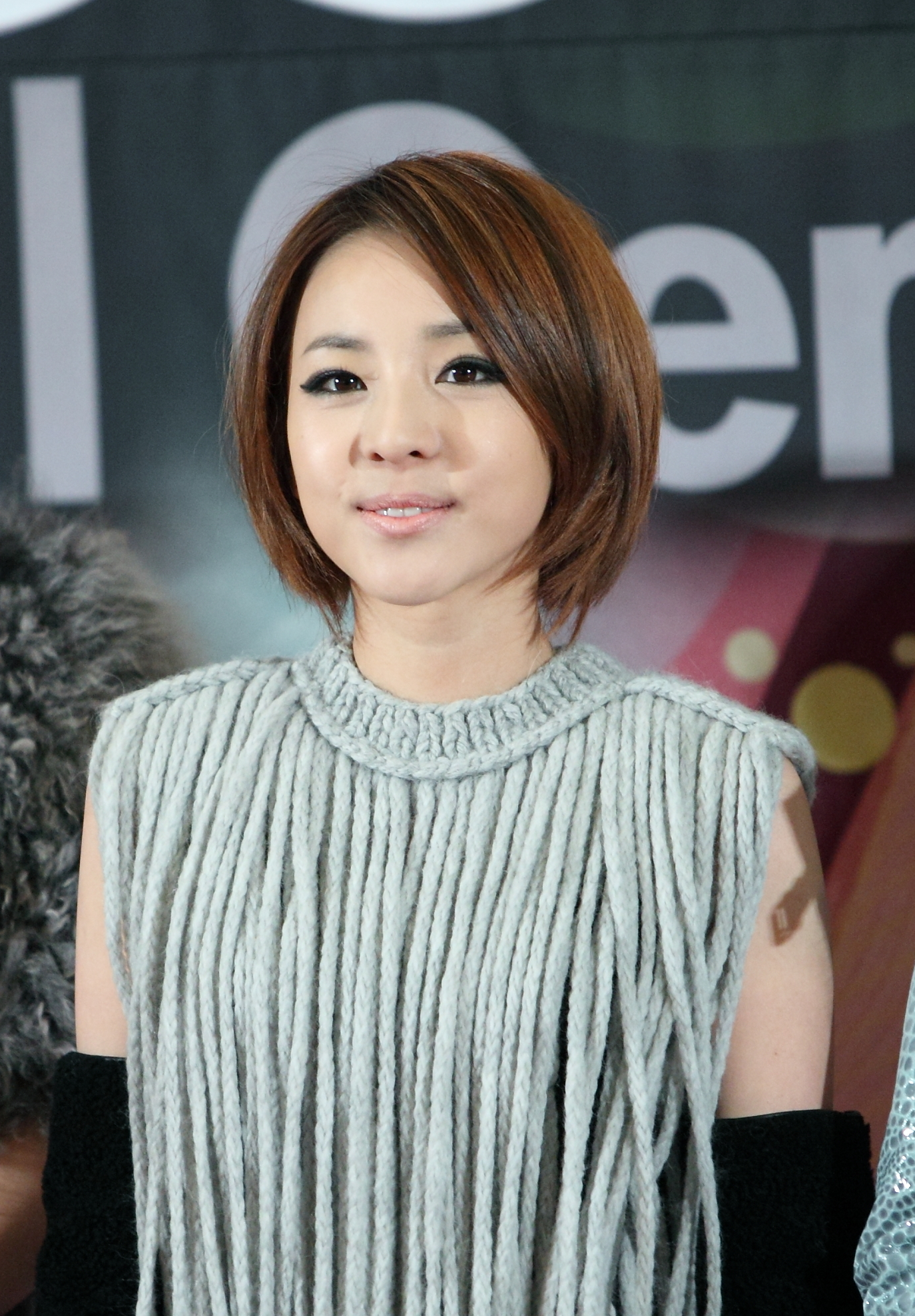
2NE1's Dara

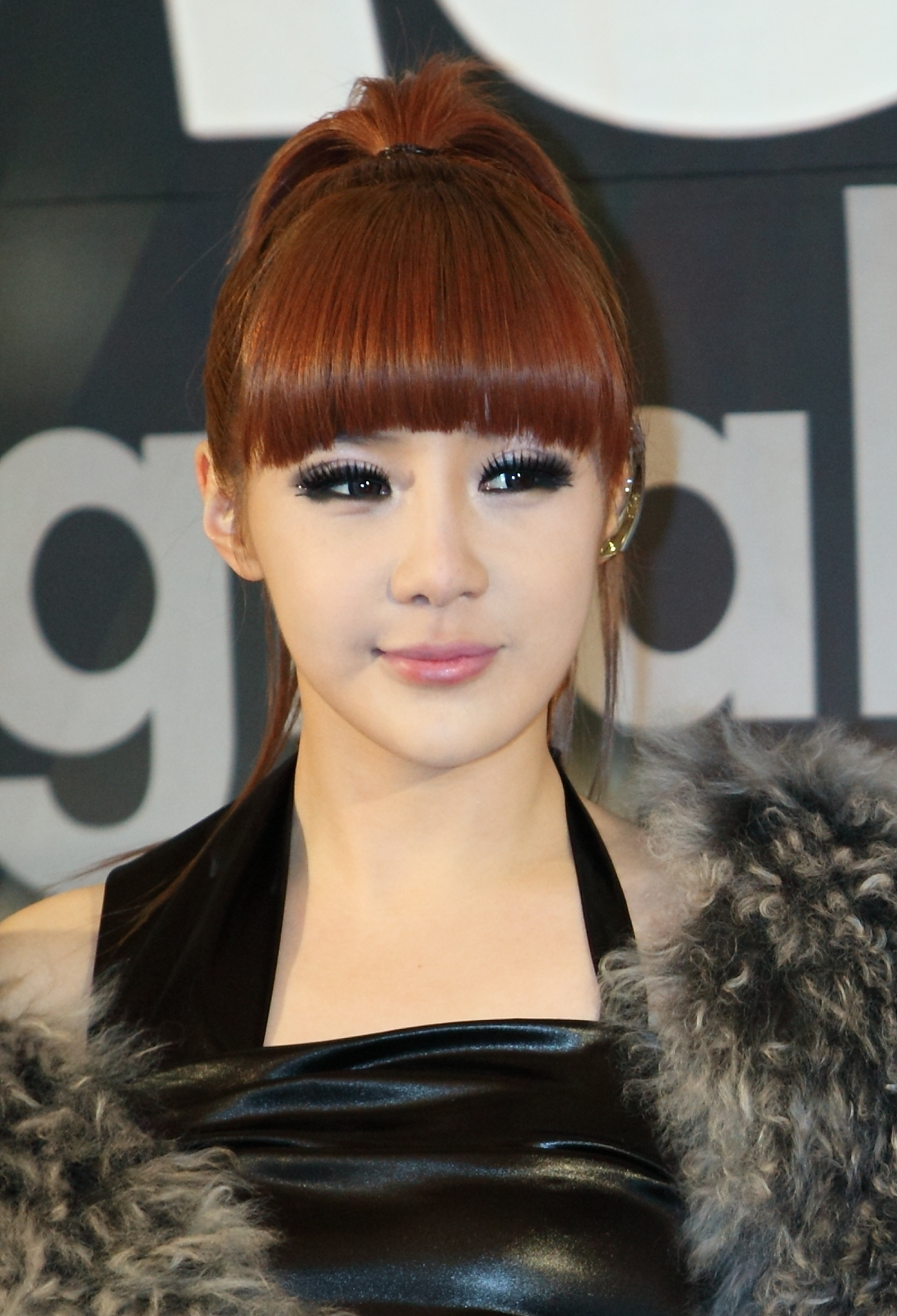
2NE1's Bom

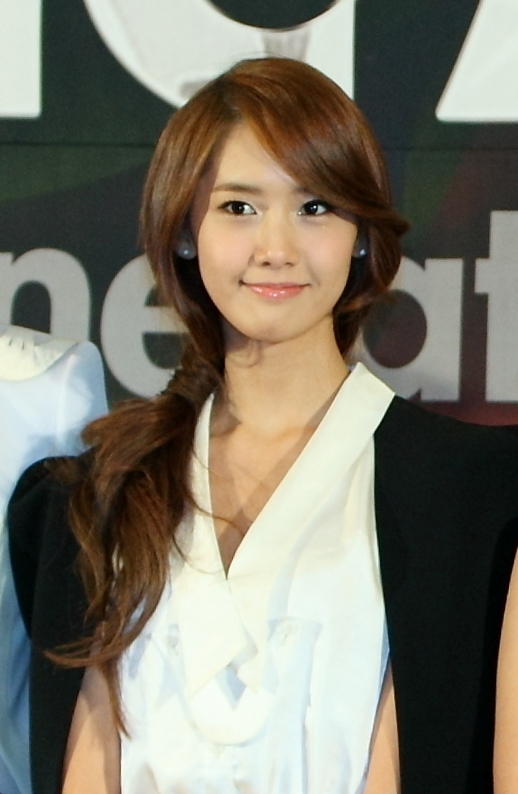
Girls' Generation's Yoona

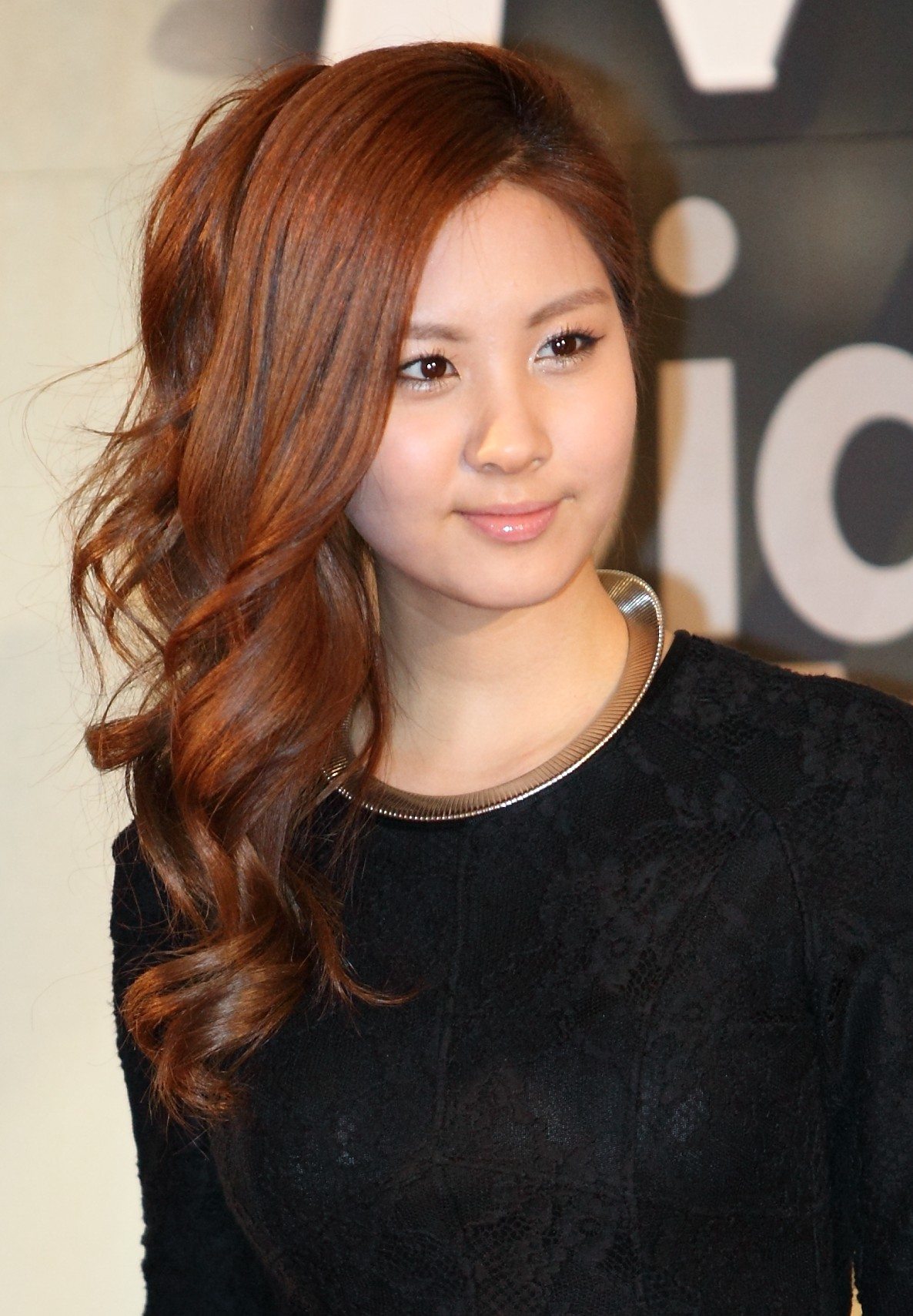
Girls' Generation's Seohyun

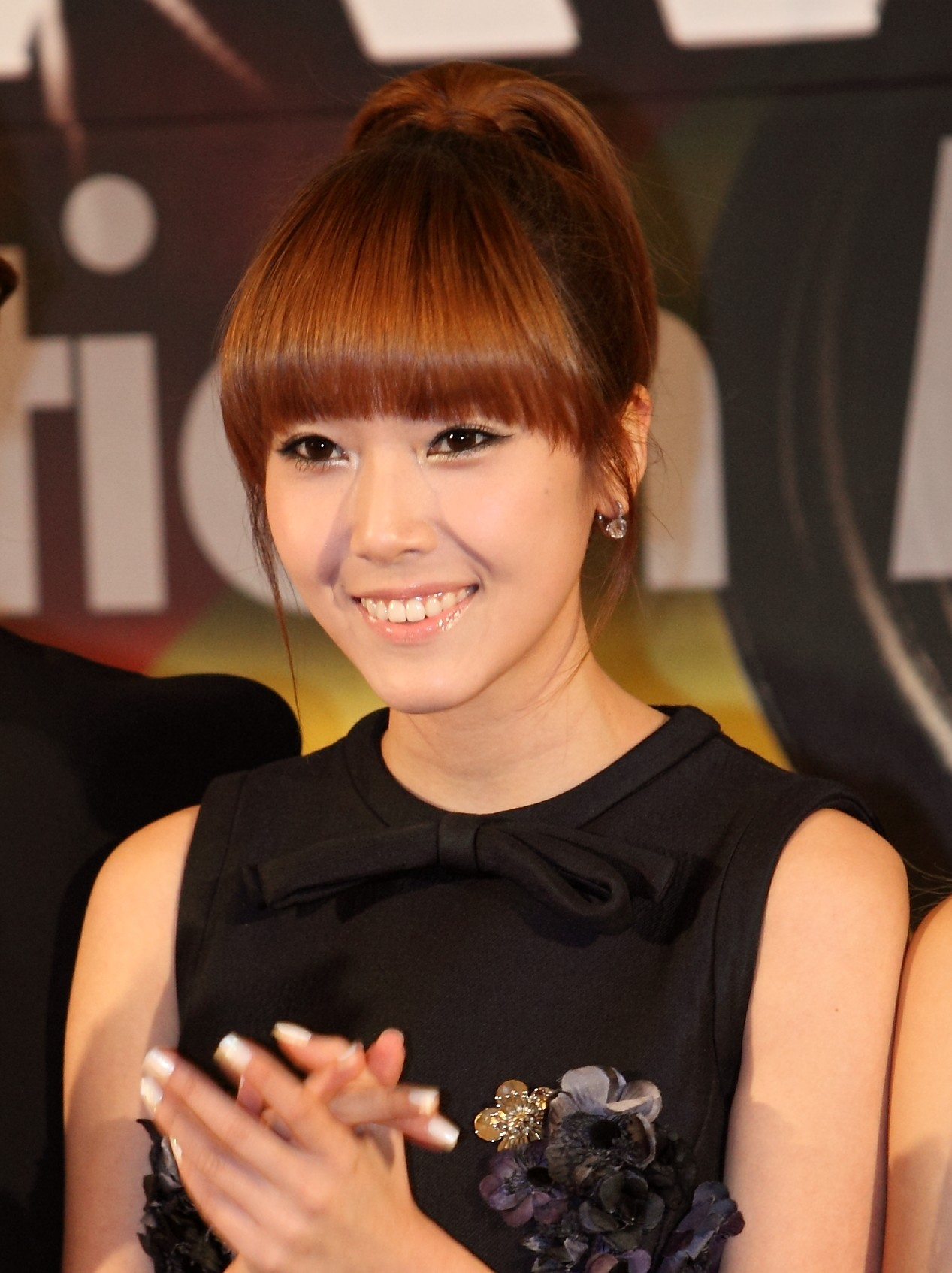
Girls' Generation's Jessica

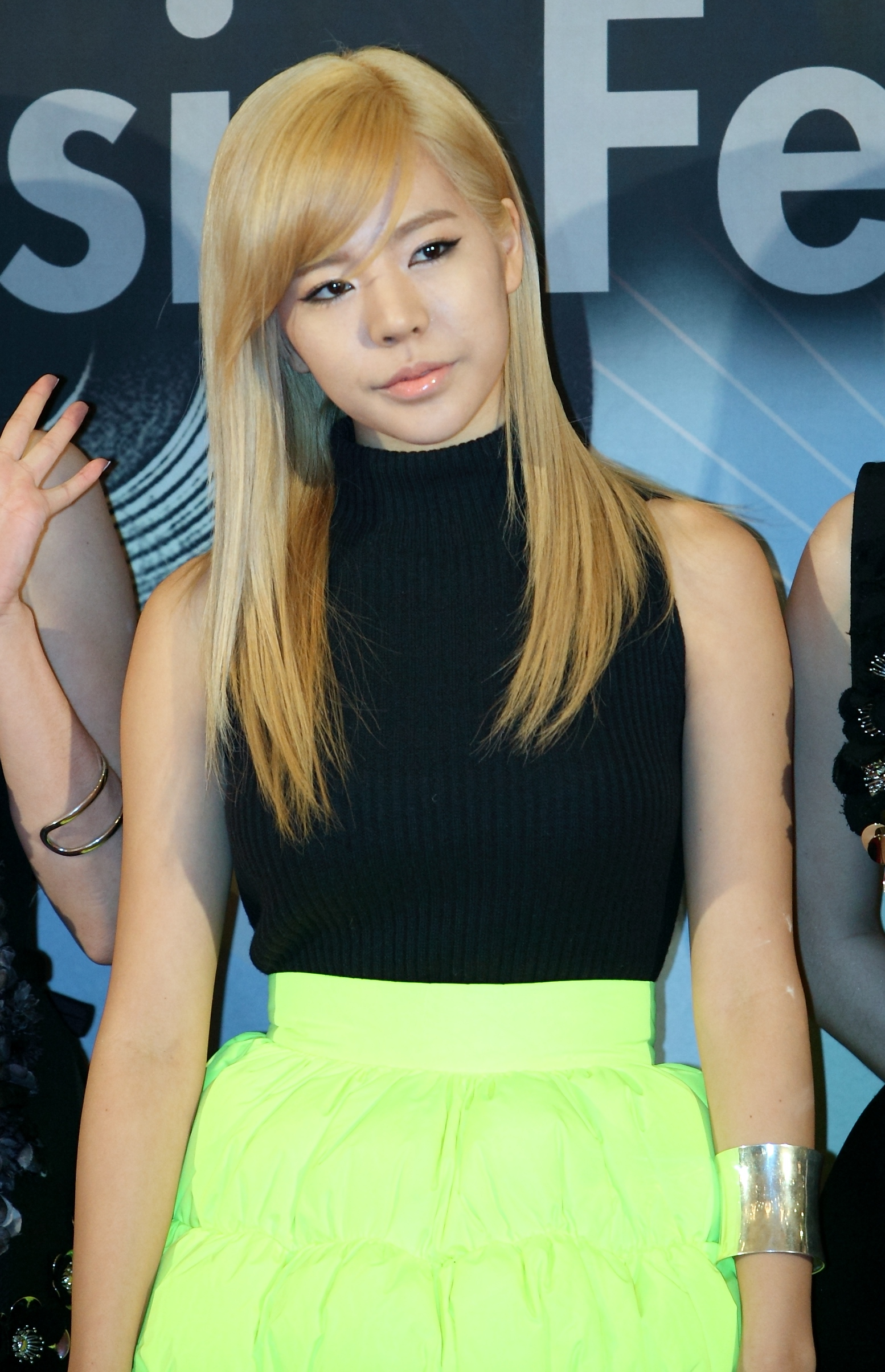
Girls' Generation's Sunny

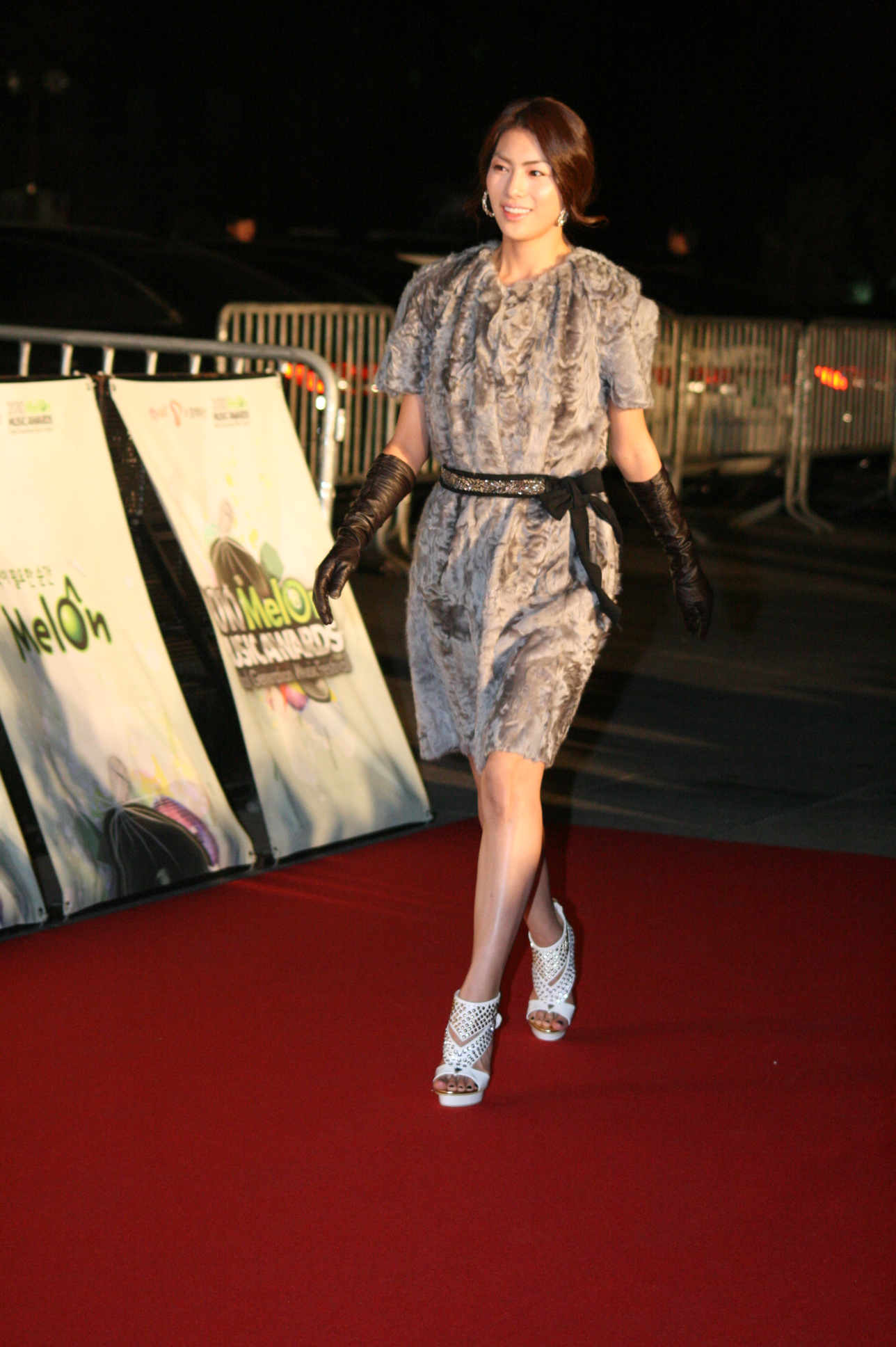
Kim Jung-hwa

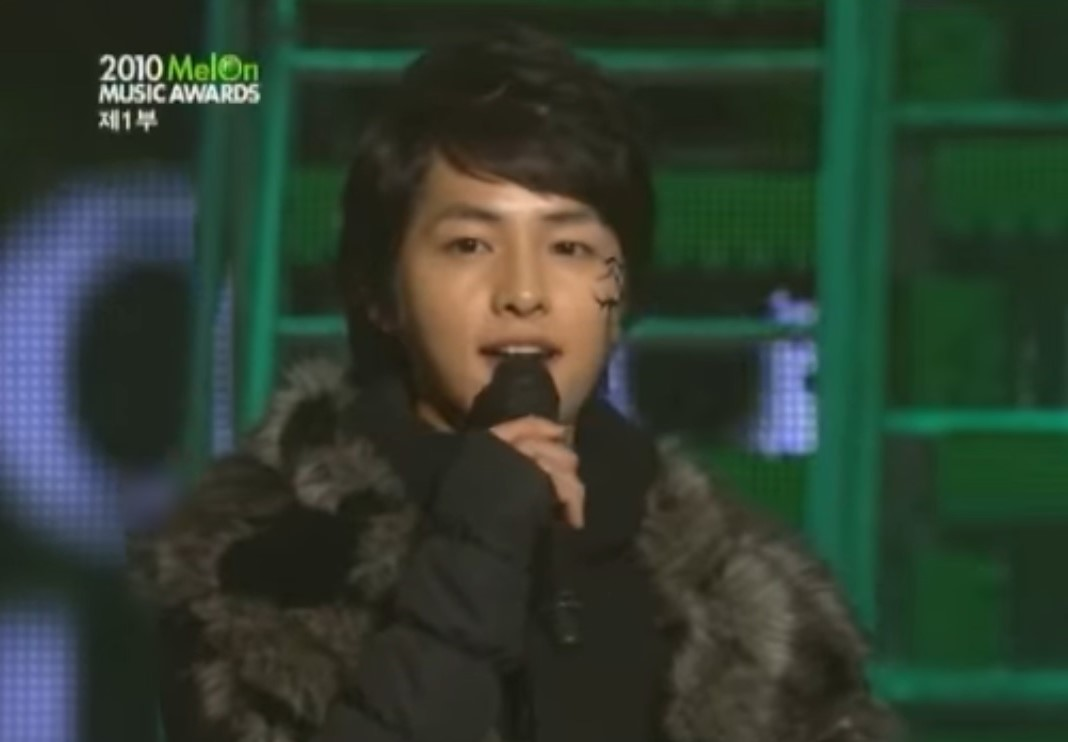
Song Joong-ki, host

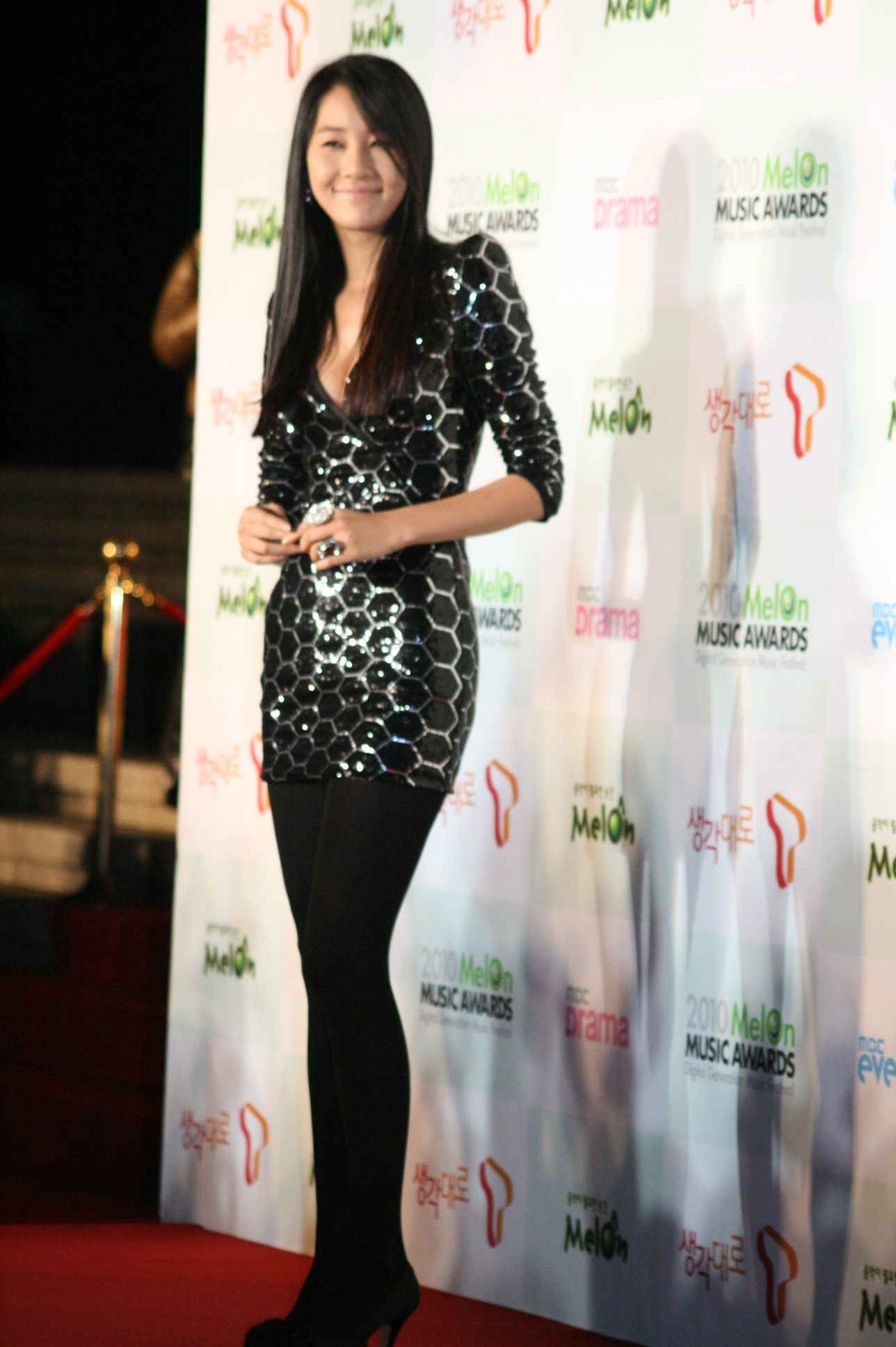
Yoon Ji-min, one of the presenters

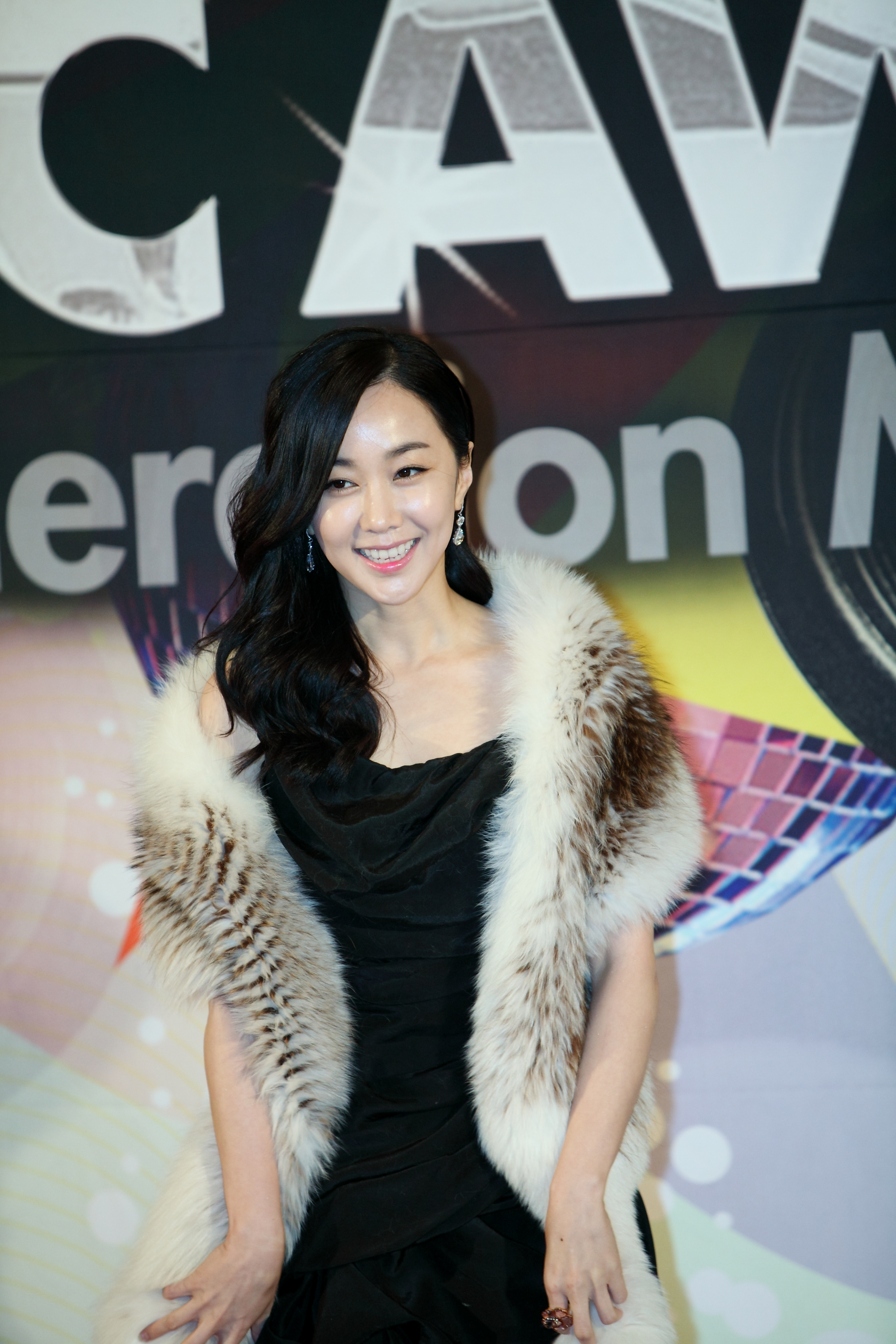
Kim Min-seo, one of the presenters
