= Day by Day (T-ara song) =

2012 song by T-ara

- Japanese digital cover

Single by T-ara

from the EP Day by Day
- Released: 3 July 2012; 26 November 2012 (JP)
- Genre: K-pop
- Length: 3:28
- Label: Core Contents Media, EMI Music Japan
- Composers: Kim Tae-hyun, Cho Young-soo
- Lyricists: Kim Tae-hyun, Cho Young-soo, Ahn Young-min, K-Smith; Makiko (JP)

T-ara singles chronology
"Lovey Dovey" (2012)	"Day by Day" (2012)	"Sexy Love" (2012)

"Day by Day" (Korean: 데이 바이 데이) is a song by South Korean girl group T-ara from the EP of the same name, released on 3 July 2012 as its lead single. It was composed by Kim Tae-hyun and produced by Cho Young-soo and Ahn Young-min. This was T-ara's first song featuring new member Areum and the last with Ryu Hwa-young.

== Background and release ==
"Day by Day" was the product of Kim Tae-Hyun, by Cho Young-soo and Ahn Young-min, who have all previously worked with T-ara on songs such as "Cry Cry" and "You Drive Me Crazy". Before its official release, a choreography video in which "Day by Day" can be heard was leaked to YouTube in late May 2012, which led to threatened legal action by Core Contents Media. The song is a ballad with a flute beat, with lyrics about a girl pleadingly begging a boy to take her with him. The song was choreographed by Jonte' Moaning, who was known for his work with American singer Beyoncé.

On 30 July 2012, Kim Kwang-Soo, Core Contents Media's representative, issued a statement that Ryu Hwa-young would unconditionally terminate her contract and quit T-ara. This incident and the previous rumors of incompatibility between the group's members caused pressure from the public and led to ending the promotion schedule of "Day by Day" early, and therefore the Inkigayo performance (aired on 29 July) marked the end of the promotion period. Hwa-Young didn't perform on stage for that performance due to an alleged foot injury. Since Hwa-Young's withdrawal was sudden, members Hyo-Min and Eun-Jung who cover of her rap parts, had to read lyrics from staff's sign on stage.

=== Japanese version ===
"Day by Day" received a Japanese version and was released as a b-side track on T-ara's 10th Japanese single "Sexy Love" along with an instrumental version on 26 November 2012. It also had another music video released only on Japanese streaming platforms which consists of different shots from the original Korean music videos. It was also released as a stand-alone single in Japan along with "Sexy Love" (Japanese Ver.) with a different cover but it is only available digitally.

== Music videos ==
The song's music video was officially released on 3 July. It was directed by Cha Eun-taek in Seoul. It was announced on 12 June 2012, as a 20-minute music video drama starring the group themselves in a science-fiction setting, reminiscent of the movie Mad Max. A large amount of work was needed to complete the computer graphics featured in the video, which caused its release to be delayed by 13 hours. The second part of the music video was released in August 2012. The video featured T-ara members with the participation of Dani, who was preparing for her debut with the group at the time, "Day By Day" was supposed to be her pre-debut. However, plans fell through and she never officially debuted with the group. Dani portrayed "the blind girl with superpowers" in the music video, she was then replaced by Eun-jung in the second part of the drama version (Sexy Love). The music video was included in the Top five Videos of the Week list by Stereogum. It was praised mostly for the concept and plot, special effects, and cliffhanger ending.

== Reception ==
=== Commercial performance ===
"Day by Day" topped all Korean real-time charts within an hour of release and achieved T-ara's sixth "all-kill". It reached number two on the Gaon Weekly Digital Singles Chart and the Billboard Korea K-Pop Hot 100. The song ranked among the best selling singles of the year with nearly 2,150,000 copies sold in South Korea alone by the end of 2012. The Japanese version of "Day by Day" peaked at number 16 on the Billboard Japan Hot 100 singles chart and debuted at first on the USEN Weekly singles chart.

=== Critical response ===
In December 2012, Owen Myers of Pop Justice, selected "Day By Day" as the third best K-pop single of the year, citing its strong live performances, and describing it as one of the most unique-sounding K‑pop tracks of 2012. In 2019, Kultscene placed it as one of the best K-pop songs of the 2010s.

== Legacy ==
In 2020, Vietnamese singers Trinh Thang Binh and Liz Kim Cuong released a duet titled "Big Difference". Shortly after the official music video release, fans noticed similarities between the song and "Day By Day" which caused a public stir among the Vietnamese fans community. However, neither sides had commented on the situation. "Everyone Will Change Eventually", a single released by Quang Hà received similar allegations in 2019. On July 23, 2024, Groovy Room released "AT H1GHR" which samples "Day By Day".

== Track listing ==
Japanese ver. (physical single)
No.	Title	Lyrics	Music	Length
1.	"Sexy Love (Japanese ver.)"	Shoko Fujibayashi	Shinsadong Tiger, Choi Kyu-sung
2.	"Day by Day (Japanese ver.)"	Makiko	Cho Young-soo, Kim Tae-hyun
3.	"Sexy Love (Japanese ver./Inst.)"		Shinsadong Tiger, Choi Kyu-sung
4.	"Day by Day (Japanese ver./Inst.)"		Cho Young-soo, Kim Tae-hyun

Japanese ver. (digital single)
No.	Title	Lyrics	Music	Length
1.	"Day by Day (Japanese Ver.)"	Makiko	Cho Young-soo, Kim Tae-hyun
2.	"Sexy Love"	Shoko Fujibayashi	Shinsadong Tiger, Choi Kyu-sung

== Charts ==
Chart (2012)	Peak position
Japan (Japan Hot 100)	16
South Korea (Gaon)	2
South Korea (K-pop Hot 100)	2

=== Year-end charts ===
Chart	Position
South Korea (Gaon)	19

== Sales ==
Region	Sales
South Korea (digital)	2,150,000

== Release history ==
Country	Date	Format	Label
Worldwide	3 July 2012	Digital download	Core Contents Media; LOEN Entertainment
South Korea	3 July 2012	Digital download	Core Contents Media; LOEN Entertainment
Japan	26 November 2012	Digital download	EMI Music Japan
