= Day by Day (EP) =

EP by T-ara
- Released: July 3, 2012
- Recorded: 2011–12
- Genres: K-pop; synthpop; nu-disco
- Length: 17:15; 24:35 (repackage)
- Label: Core Contents
- Producer: Kwon Chang-hyun

T-ara chronology
Jewelry Box (2012)	Day by Day (2012)	T-ara's Best of Best 2009-2012: Korean ver. (2012)

Singles from Day by Day
- 1. "Day by Day" Released: July 3, 2012

Music video
- "Day by Day (Drama ver.)" on YouTube "Day by Day (Dance ver.)" on YouTube

Repackage cover
- Mirage re-release cover

Singles from Mirage
- 1. "Sexy Love" Released: September 4, 2012; 2. "Day and Night (Love All)" Released: September 4, 2012

Music video
- Sexy Love (Dance ver.) on YouTube "Sexy Love (Drama ver.)" on YouTube

Day by Day is the fourth extended play by South Korean girl group T-ara, released on July 3, 2012, by Core Contents Media. The album marked the first appearance of the group's eighth member, Areum, and the last appearance of member Ryu Hwa-young. A repackaged version of the EP, titled Mirage, was released on September 4, 2012. "Sexy Love" was released as the lead single from the Mirage repackage.

The EP and its repackage produced the singles "Day By Day" and "Sexy Love". Both the album and singles appeared on Gaon and Billboard Korea yearly sales charts for 2012. However, the album's promotion was cut short due to the group's bullying controversy which resulted in Hwayoung's contract termination and dismissal from the group.

== Background and release ==
On June 13, 2012, Core Contents Media announced that the group would be releasing a new EP entitled Day by Day on July 3. The EP marked the debut of T-ara's eighth member, Areum. Both the EP and its title track were released on July 3.

"Day by Day" was written by Kim Tae-Hyun and produced by Cho Young-soo and Ahn Young-min, who have all previously worked with T-ara on songs such as "Cry Cry" and "Neo Ttaemune Michyeo". Before its official release, a choreography video in which "Day by Day" can be heard in was leaked onto YouTube in late May 2012. The music video for "Day by Day" was directed by Cha Eun-Taek in Seoul, South Korea. It was announced on June 12, 2012, as a 20-minute music video drama starring the group themselves in a science-fiction setting; reminiscent of the movie Mad Max. A large amount of work was needed to complete the computer graphics featured in the video, which caused its release to be delayed by 13 hours. The second part of the music video was released in August 2012. The music video was included in "Top 5 Music Videos of the Week" list by Stereogum.

A repackaged version of the EP, titled Mirage, was released on September 4, 2012. It contained two additional tracks, "Sexy Love" and "Day and Night (Love All)". A Japanese version of "Day by Day" was digitally released on September 26, 2012, and was included as a B-side on their fifth Japanese single, a Japanese version of "Sexy Love".

== Controversies ==
In June 2019, Vietnamese singer Quang Hà was accused of plagiarism after netizens noticed similarities between his newest single "Ai rồi cũng sẽ khác" (Everyone Will Change) and "Day by Day"'s intro. On July 4, he and Phúc Trường, the composer of the song, held a press conference in which he admitted that the two songs did sound identical at the beginning. He later apologized for not being aware of international music and not noticing the similarities.

== Commercial performance ==
"Day by Day" reached number two on the weekly Gaon Digital Chart and the K-pop Hot 100. The song ranked among the best-selling singles of the year with nearly 2,150,000 downloads sold in South Korea by the end of 2012. "Sexy Love" peaked at number three on the Billboard Korea Hot 100 Songs chart and sold nearly 1,550,000 downloads in 2012. The Japanese version of "Day by Day" peaked at 16 on Billboard Japan Hot 100.

== Track listing ==
Day by Day track list
No.	Title	Lyrics	Music	Arrangement	Length
1.	"Day by Day"	Ahn Young-min, Cho Young-soo, Kim Tae-hyun, K-Smith	Cho Young-soo, Kim Tae-hyun	Cho Young-soo, Kim Tae-hyun	3:28
2.	"Holiday"	Kim Ki-beom, Kang Ji-won	Kim Ki-beom, Kang Ji-won	Kang Ji-won	3:16
3.	"Don't Leave" (떠나지마; Tteonajima)	Ahn Young-min	Cho Young-soo	Cho Young-soo	3:48
4.	"Hue"	Kim Ki-beom, Kang Ji-won	Kim Ki-beom, Kang Ji-won	Kang Ji-won	3:26
5.	"Love Game" (사랑놀이; Sarangnori)	Kim Hee-sun	Park Deok-sang, Park Hyun-joong	Park Deok-sang, Park Hyun-joong	3:17
Total length:					17:15

Mirage track list
No.	Title	Lyrics	Music	Arrangement	Length
1.	"Sexy Love"	Shinsadong Tiger, Choi Kyu-Sung	Shinsadong Tiger, Choi Kyu-Sung	Shinsadong Tiger	3:45
2.	"Love All" (낮과 밤; Day and Night)				3:25
3.	"Day by Day"				3:29
4.	"Holiday"				3:16
5.	"Don't Leave" (떠나지마; Tteonajima)				3:49
6.	"Hue"				3:26
7.	"Love Game" (사랑놀이; Sarangnori)	Kim Hee-Sun	Park Deok-sang, Park Hyun-joong	Park Deok-sang, Park Hyun-joong	3:17
Total length:					24:35

Note: "Day and Night (Love All)" is only included on the physical release.

== Charts ==
=== Day by Day ===
Chart	Peak position
Japanese Albums (Oricon)	28
South Korean Weekly Albums (Gaon)	5
South Korean Monthly Albums (Gaon)	4
Taiwanese Albums (G-Music)	3

=== Mirage ===
Chart	Peak position
Japanese Albums (Oricon)	45
South Korean Weekly Albums (Gaon)	2
South Korean Monthly Albums (Gaon)	5

== Sales ==
Album sales
Region	Sales
South Korea	73,000
Japan	15,700

== Release history ==
Country	Date	Format	Label
Worldwide	July 3, 2012	Digital download	Core Contents Media; LOEN Entertainment
South Korea	July 3, 2012	Digital download	Core Contents Media; LOEN Entertainment
South Korea	July 3, 2012	CD	Core Contents Media; LOEN Entertainment
South Korea	September 4, 2012	Digital download (repackage)	Core Contents Media; LOEN Entertainment
South Korea	September 4, 2012	CD (repackage)	Core Contents Media; LOEN Entertainment
