= Temptastic =

EP by T-ara
- Released: December 1, 2010 (Digital); December 3, 2010 (Physical)
- Recorded: 2010
- Genre: Pop; dance-pop; electropop
- Length: 22:00
- Language: Korean
- Label: Core Contents; CJ E&M
- Producer: Kwon Chang-hyun

T-ara chronology
| Absolute First Album (2009) | Temptastic (2010) | John Travolta Wannabe (2011) |

Singles from Temptastic
- 1. "Why Are You Being Like This?" Released: November 23, 2010; 2. "Yayaya" Released: December 1, 2010

Temptastic is the debut extended play by the South Korean girl group T-ara. It was released on December 1, 2010, through digital retailers by Core Contents Media. The EP marked the first appearance of the group's seventh member, Ryu Hwayoung. The EP spawned two lead singles, "Why Are You Being Like This?" and "Yayaya".

In the works since at least late-2010, the physical album's release was originally scheduled alongside its digital release but was delayed until December 3, 2010, due to the bombardment of Yeonpyeong earlier that November.

== Singles ==
"Why Are You Being Like This?" was released as the lead single for Temptastic on November 23, 2010. The single is the group's first release to feature their newly added seventh member, Hwayoung. Written by label-mate Yangpa and produced by Kim Do-hoon and Lee Sang-ho, the song contains influences from 1980s synthpop and features the use of an electric guitar in the instrumental. The music video for "Wae Ireoni" premiered on November 23, 2010, the same day as the single's release. The director of the video was Lee Dae-jin, while the choreography was done by YAMA&HOTCHICKS.

"Yayaya", the EP's second single, was released alongside its parent album on December 1, 2010. In a statement regarding the abstract lyrics, E-Tribe explained: "I used the hook technique to turn the song into a sort of riddle. I wanted the unique expressions to arouse the curiosity of listeners. [...] I wanted to express the unique music through lyrics that sounded like a spell. Please don’t misunderstand it and just enjoy the exciting music." The music video features costumes and gestures (patting their hands over their mouths, finding a young man (No Min-woo) who crashed there and tying him to a stake, and living in teepees) some have called stereotypical Native American. On the December 12, 2010 broadcast of Mnet's M! Countdown, "Yayaya" won the first place spot. The song was eventually re-recorded in Japanese and released on November 30, 2011, serving as the group's second single in the territory.

== Promotions ==
T-ara began promotions for their Temptastic mini-album on December 3, 2010, performing "Wae Ireoni" alongside "Yayaya" on KBS's Music Bank. During this promotional period, T-ara's initial performance outfits failed dress regulations enforced by the music programs twice, due to short shorts or skirts worn by the group. Their staff was forced to rush out and purchase stockings or leggings at the last minute.

== Reception ==
In 2017, SBS PopAsia, named "Why Are You Being Like This?" as among T-ara's best singles. In 2021, KKBox Hong Kong also included "Ya Ya Ya" in their list of the Best classic K-pop songs of 2010 praising its style and dance. In 2024, the song was also included on NME's best T-ara songs list.

== Track listing ==
| No. | Title | Lyrics | Music | Arrangement | Length |
|---|---|---|---|---|---|
| 1. | "Yayaya" | E-Tribe | E-Tribe | E-Tribe, Chang Jun-ho | 03:26 |
| 2. | "Why Are You Being Like This?" (왜 이러니?) | Lee Eun-jin (Yangpa) | Kim Do-hoon, Lee Sang-ho | Lee Sang-ho | 03:57 |
| 3. | "Ma Boo" | Kim Do-hoon, Rhymer | Kim Do-hoon | Kim Do-hoon | 03:22 |
| 4. | "I Don't Know" (몰라요) | Shinsadong Tiger, Choi Kyu-sung | Shinsadong Tiger, Choi Kyu-sung | Shinsadong Tiger, Choi Kyu-sung | 03:38 |
| 5. | "I'm Okay" (괜찮아요) | Choi Kyu-sung | Choi Kyu-sung | Choi Kyu-sung | 03:58 |
| 6. | "Yayaya" (Inst.) | | E-Tribe | E-Tribe, Chang Jun-ho | 03:26 |

== Charts ==
=== Weekly charts ===
| Chart (2010) | Peak position |
|---|---|
| South Korean Albums (Circle) | 2 |

=== Year-end charts ===
| Chart (2010) | Position |
|---|---|
| South Korean Albums (Gaon) | 81 |

| Chart (2011) | Position |
|---|---|
| South Korean Albums (Gaon) | 83 |
