= Black Eyes (EP) =

EP by T-ara
- Released: November 11, 2011
- Recorded: 2011
- Genre: K-pop
- Length: 20:12
- Label: Core Contents
- Producer: Kwon Chang-hyun

T-ara chronology
John Travolta Wannabe (2011)	Black Eyes (2011)	Jewelry Box (2012)

Singles from Black Eyes
- 1. "Cry Cry" Released: November 11, 2011

Music video
- "Cry Cry (Dance ver.)" on YouTube "Cry Cry (Drama ver.)" on YouTube

Alternative cover
- Funky Town re-release cover

Singles from Funky Town
- 1. "We Were in Love" Released: December 23, 2011; 2. "Lovey-Dovey" Released: January 3, 2012

Music video
- "Lovey-Dovey (Zombie ver.)" on YouTube "Lovey-Dovey (Drama ver.)" on YouTube "We Were in Love" on YouTube

Black Eyes is the third extended play by South Korean girl group T-ara. Its release was originally set for release on November 18, 2011, but was pushed forward one week to November 11 due to the demand for the album's lead track, "Cry Cry". A repackaged version of the EP (though called the fifth album), titled Funky Town, was released on January 3, 2012, with the song "Lovey-Dovey" serving as the lead track.

"Lovey-Dovey" is a song known for its catchy melody and energetic beats. The song features a mix of electronic and dance-pop elements. The lyrics convey a playful and flirtatious theme, complemented by the group's vibrant choreography in the music video. "Lovey-Dovey" gained popularity for its infectious rhythm and became a hit in the K-pop scene.

== Background and promotion ==
The group's agency, Core Contents Media, released a series of jacket photos for the single "Cry Cry", on November 4, 2011. Black Eyes was released on November 17, 2011, with the single "Cry Cry" being released on the same day. "Cry Cry" was promoted on multiple music shows, starting on Mnet's M! Countdown on the 17th, following with KBS's Music Bank on the 18th.

== Music videos ==
On November 9, two days before the album's release, the group officially released the video clip of the song "Cry Cry" as a music movie. In the video, T-ara sheds the usual feminine image, replacing it with strong images and intense gunfight scenes. At the end of the story was the audio teaser of "Lovey Dovey".

The drama version of "Lovey Dovey" was a continuation of "Cry Cry" Drama Version that ended the story. The "Cry Cry" / "Lovey Dovey" short movie is considered one of the longest music videos in K-pop's history. It cost around US$1 million (₩1.2 billion) to produce, making it one of the most expensive music videos in K-pop.

Several other versions of "Cry Cry" and "Lovey Dovey" were released, including Dance, Zombie, and Ballad among others. The audio track from the "Cry Cry" ballad version's music video was included on Black Eyes along with the original ballad version of the song.

=== Reception ===
An editor for KKBox Taiwan praised the "Cry Cry" (Drama Ver.) music video, describing it as "as exciting as a mini-movie" and featured it in their list of the bloodiest K-pop music videos.

== Reception ==
"Cry Cry" peaked at number 1 on both the Gaon Digital Chart and K-pop Hot 100. The song has sold 3,755,993 digital units in South Korea as of 2012. "We Were In Love", a single from Funky Town reached number 1 on Gaon and sold nearly 2,670,000 digital units by 2012. The music video for the song has reached over 97 million YouTube views as of June 2024. "Lovey-Dovey" scored the number one position on the Gaon singles chart In 2012 becoming the album's third consecutive number-one hit. The song has achieved digital sales of over 3.7 million in South Korea alone. "Cry Cry" was named the 6th best T-ara single by SBS PopAsia as well as the 49th best K-pop song of all time in a list by Popkultur. In 2024, NME ranked the song at No. 8 on its list of T-ARA's best songs describing it as a "Heartbreak anthem". "Lovey Dovey" ranked first on the same list

== Track listings ==
No.	Title	Lyrics	Music	Arrangement	Length
1.	"Cry Cry"	Kim Tae-hyun, Cho Young-soo, Ahn Young-min	Kim Tae-hyun, Cho Young-soo	Kim Tae-hyun, Cho Young-soo	3:17
2.	"Goodbye, OK"	Ahn Young-min	Ahn Young-min, Lee Yoo-jin	Lee Yoo-jin	3:05
3.	"O My God"	Choi Kyu-sung	Choi Kyu-sung	Choi Kyu-sung	4:05
4.	"I'm So Bad"	Ahn Young-min	Kim Tae-hyun, Cho Young-soo	Kim Tae-hyun, Cho Young-soo	3:12
5.	"Cry Cry" (Ballad Ver.)	Kim Tae-hyun, Cho Young-soo, Ahn Young-min	Kim Tae-hyun, Cho Young-soo	Kim Tae-hyun, Cho Young-soo	3:18
6.	"Cry Cry" (Ballad Music Video Ver.) (Digital Only)	Kim Tae-hyun, Cho Young-soo, Ahn Young-min	Kim Tae-hyun, Cho Young-soo	Kim Tae-hyun, Cho Young-soo	3:12
Total length:					20:12

=== Funky Town ===
No.	Title	Length
1.	"Lovey-Dovey"	03:35
2.	"우리 사랑했잖아" (Uri Saranghaejjanha, "We Were in Love") (collaboration with Davichi)	03:35
3.	"Lovey-Dovey" (Club Remix Ver.)	03:47
4.	"Cry Cry"	03:17
5.	"Goodbye, OK"	03:05
6.	"O My God"	04:06
7.	"I'm So Bad"	03:12
8.	"Cry Cry" (Ballad Ver.)	03:18
Total length:		27:57

== Charts ==
=== Black Eyes ===
Chart	Peak position
South Korea (Gaon) Weekly albums	2
South Korea (Gaon) Monthly albums	5
South Korea (Gaon) Yearly albums	28

=== Funky Town ===
Chart	Peak position
South Korea (Gaon) Weekly albums	1
South Korea (Gaon) Monthly albums	2
South Korea (Gaon) Yearly albums	20
Japan (Oricon) Weekly albums	31

== Sales ==
Country	Sales amount
South Korea	48,205
South Korea (repackage)	76,749

== Accolades ==
=== Listicles ===
"Cry Cry" was named the 6th best T-ara single by SBS PopAsia and the eighth on NME list of T-ARA's best songs. "Lovey Dovey" ranked first on the same list

Year	Publisher	List	Work	Rank	Ref.
2014	Y Magazine	120 Greatest Dance Tracks of All Time	"Cry Cry"	49th	
2021	KKBOX Taiwan	Top K-POP songs of 2011	"Cry Cry"	Placed	

=== Awards and nominations ===
Award ceremony	Year	Category	Nominee / work	Result	Ref.
Mnet Asian Music Awards	2012	Best Collaboration	"We Were In Love"	Nominated	
Golden Disc Awards	2013	Disk Bonsang	Funky Town	Nominated	
Golden Disc Awards	2013	Popularity Award	Funky Town	Nominated	
Seoul Music Awards	2013	Popularity Award	Funky Town	Nominated	
Seoul Music Awards	2013	Main Prize (Bonsang)	Funky Town	Won	
