= Why Are You Being Like This? =

2010 single by T-ara

- Digital cover

Single by T-ara

from the album Temptastic
- Language: Korean
- Released: November 23, 2010
- Recorded: 2010
- Genre: K-pop; dance-pop
- Length: 3:57
- Label: Core Contents Media
- Composers: Kim Do Hoon, Lee Sang Ho
- Lyricist: Yangpa

T-ara singles chronology
"You Drive Me Crazy" (2010)	"Why Are You Being Like This?" (2010)	"yayaya" (2010)

Music video
- "Why Are Being Like This?" on YouTube

"Why Are You Being Like This?" (Korean: 왜 이러니; RR: Wae ireoni) (also translated as "What's Wrong?") (Note: The original Hangul title of the song is "왜 이러니", which is credited in English as either "What's Wrong?" or "Why Do You Act like That?".) is a single recorded by South Korean girl group T-ara, released on November 23, 2010 as the lead single from the group's first extended play Temptastic. The song peaked at number four on the Gaon Chart, marking T-ara's ninth top-ten entry. It ranked as one of the best-selling singles of 2010, amassing over 1.7 million downloads. (Note: Cumulative sales figures for "What's Wrong" in 2010 and 2011)

== Background and release ==
Concept photos promoting the single were released on November 22, 2010. "Why Are You Being Like This?" was released as the lead single for Temptastic on November 23, 2010. The single is the group's first release to feature their newly added seventh member, Hwayoung. The choreography was done by Yama & Hotchicks, who choreographed some of T-ara's previous hits, including "Bo Peep Bo Peep" and "I Go Crazy Because of You". T-ara revealed that they personally requested their close friend and fellow agency artist Yangpa to write the lyrics, and she gladly contributed to the project.

On October 10, 2012, "Why Are You Being Like This" was featured on T-ara's first greatest hits album, T-ara's Best of Best 2009–2012: Korean ver along with its music video on the DVD set. It was also recorded in Japanese and released on June 6, 2012, on the group's second Japanese album Jewelry Box.

In October 2025, the boy band BAE173 released a remake of the song, while keeping Soyeon's chorus vocals on the new release.

== Composition ==
Written by label-mate Yangpa and produced by Kim Do-hoon and Lee Sang-ho, the song contains influences from 1980s synthpop and features the use of an electric guitar in the instrumental.

== Music video ==
Unlike T-ara's previous releases, "Why Are You Being Like This?" has no teaser. The song's official music video premiered on November 23, 2010, the same day as the single's release, on South Korean media player GOMTV. The director of the video was Lee Dae-jin. It wasn't until November 26, 2013, that the music video was officially released on YouTube, licensed by 1thek.

== Promotion and live performances ==
T-ara began promotions for their "Why Are You Being Like This?" on December 3, 2010, on KBS's Music Bank. However, due to the chosen outfits for the song not meeting KBS's dress code regulations, the group's company Core Contents Media, had to buy additional leggings at the last minute. A similar issue was raised following their performance on December 11, 2010. The group delivered a special Christmas-themed stage on MBC's Show! Music Core, on December 25, 2010. The performance was well-received by the audience for the group's charm, elegance, and energetic presence, complemented by personalized outfits that added a unique touch to the stage.

== Reception ==
=== Commercial performance ===
"Why Are You Being Like This?" peaked at number four on Gaon chart and charted for 15 weeks. It also debuted at number two on the download chart. Despite being released in late November, the song was placed at number 77 on Gaon annual digital chart and was one of the best-selling singles of 2010 over 1.7 million downloads. (Note: Cumulative sales figures for "What's Wrong" in 2010 and 2011) The song received a music show win on M Countdown, dated December 9, 2010.

=== Critical reception ===
In 2017, Jeff Benjamin of SBS PopAsia, named "Why Are You Being Like This?" as among T-ara's best singles.

== Awards and nominations ==
Program	Date	Ref.
M Countdown	December 9, 2010	

== Charts ==
=== Weekly charts ===
Chart (2010)	Peak position
South Korea (Gaon)	4

=== Monthly charts ===
Chart (2010)	Peak position
South Korea (Gaon)	7

=== Year-end charts ===
Chart (2010)	Position
South Korea (Gaon)	77

== Release history ==
Country	Date	Version	Distributing label	Format
South Korea	November 23, 2010	Single	Mnet Media	Digital download
South Korea	December 3, 2010	Temptastic	Mnet Media	Digital download
