= Yayaya =

2010 single by T-ara

- Japanese cover

Single by T-ara

from the album: Temptastic; Jewelry Box
- Language: Korean; Japanese
- B-side: "Roly Poly"
- Released: December 1, 2010; November 30, 2011 (JP)
- Genre: K-pop; J-pop; dance-pop; electro-pop
- Length: 3:28
- Label: Mnet Media; EMI Records Japan
- Composers: E-Tribe; Jang Jun-ho
- Lyricists: E-Tribe; Fujino Takafumi

T-ara singles chronology
"Why Are You Being Like This?" (2010)	"Yayaya" (2010)	"Roly Poly" (2011)

Music video
- "Yayaya" on YouTube "Yayaya" (Japanese Ver.) on YouTube

"Yayaya" is a single recorded by South Korean girl group T-ara, released on December 1, 2010 as the second single for T-ara's first extended play, Temptastic. The song peaked at number five on the Gaon Chart, marking T-ara's tenth top-ten entry. It also emerged as one of the best-selling singles released in 2010, amassing approximately 1.5 million downloads. (Note: Cumulative sales figures for "Yayaya" in 2010 and 2011.) Due to the bombardment of Yeonpyeong earlier that November, the release and promotion for the single along with the album were delayed. The song was re-released in Japanese on November 30, 2011 as the second single for T-ara's first Japanese studio album, Jewelry Box.

== Background and release ==
Concept photos promoting the single were released on November 22, 2010. The release was delayed until December 3, 2010, due to the bombardment of Yeonpyeong earlier that November. "Yayaya" was released as the second single for Temptastic on December 1, 2010. The choreography was done by Yama & Hotchicks dance studio, who choreographed some of T-ara's previous hits, including "Bo Peep Bo Peep" and "You're Driving Me Crazy" and "Why Are You Being Like This?". Both "Yayaya" and "Ma Boo", a side-track on the EP, were supposed to be Coed school's debut songs.

On October 14, 2011, EMI Records, T-ara's former Japanese label, announced that "Yayaya" would be recorded and released in Japan later that year. On November 30, 2011, "Yayaya" (Japanese Ver.) was released as T-ara's second single in the country. Digitally, it was released on Recochoku on November 29, 2011. It was later re-released on the group's second Japanese album Jewelry Box. The song was also featured on T-ara's first Japanese greatest hits album Queen of Pops on July 2, 2014.

== Composition ==
"Yayaya" is the work of composer E-Tribe, who composed Lee Hyori's "U-Go-Girl" and Girls' Generation's "Gee". It is described as a track with an addictive melody, engaging lyrics, and a distinctive arrangement. The composition is noted for its fresh and unique approach, uncommon in typical arrangements. The repetitive onomatopoeic phrases were designed as a "riddle format" to intrigue listeners and enhance the song's appeal.

In a statement regarding the abstract lyrics, E-Tribe explained: "I used the hook technique to turn the song into a sort of riddle. I wanted the unique expressions to arouse the curiosity of listeners. [...] I wanted to express the unique music through lyrics that sounded like a spell. Please don't misunderstand it and just enjoy the exciting music."

== Music video ==
Unlike T-ara's previous releases, "Yayaya" had no teaser. The song's official music video premiered on December 1, 2010, the same day as the album's release, on South Korean media player GOMTV. It was directed by Cha Eun-taek. The music video features costumes and gestures (patting their hands over their mouths, finding a young man (No Min-woo) who crashed there and tying him to a stake, and living in teepees). It wasn't until November 27, 2013, that the music video was officially released on YouTube, licensed by 1thek.

== Promotion and live performances ==
Promotions were postponed following the Yeonpyeong bombardment. Furthermore, Eunjung's knee injury added to the disruptions, further complicating their promotional activities. T-ara began promotions for their "Yayaya" on December 3, 2010, on KBS's Music Bank. During this promotional period, T-ara's initial performance outfits failed dress regulations enforced by the music programs twice, due to short shorts or skirts worn by the group. Their staff was forced to rush out and purchase stockings or leggings at the last minute. Promotions were swiftly redirected to highlight the title track, "Why Are You Being Like This?". Afterwards, the song became a staple on the setlist for most T-ara tours and concerts, including tours for Jewelry Box, Treasure Box, and the T-ara Great China Tour, among others.

== Reception ==
=== Critical reception ===
"Yayaya" received mixed reactions due to its unconventional concept and lyrics. In a review by Jeong Ho-jae, a critic from the newspaper The Dong-A Ilbo, He describes it as featuring addictive hooks, experimental arrangements, and enigmatic lyrics that embody audacity and creativity. While praising "Yayaya" for its unique approach and striking visuals, including Indian-inspired costumes, he critiques the excessive use of electric sounds, chaotic structure, and reliance on the "hook song formula". The choreography and performance style, although engaging, drew mixed reactions and sparked memes, illustrating the risks associated with pushing creative boundaries. In a more positive review, Young-woong from StarNews praises the song's sophisticated feel, highlighting the tension created by jungle-like Indian sounds and mechanical vocals over a fast drum beat. She notes the addictive chorus and easy-to-follow lyrics, enhanced by autotune for a polished vibe. She also highlights the alternation between the members' cute and sexy voices, combined with the rap in the bridge, which adds energy to the track. She further notes that the lyrics, expressing a girl's emotions in love, and the repetitive hooks intensify the excitement, making it a standout dance song.

The Dong-A Ilbo examined it as either a bold experiment or a misstep in K-pop evolution, praising its energy and bold concept while acknowledging its polarizing reception. He remarked that, despite the criticism, the track solidified T-ara's reputation as innovators. In 2021, KKBox Hong Kong included "Yayaya" in their list of the Best classic K-pop songs of 2010 praising its style and dance. In 2024, the song was included on NME's best T-ara songs list.

=== Commercial performance ===
"Yayaya" peaked at number five on Gaon chart. It was also one of the best-selling singles released in 2010 with approximately 1.5 million downloads. (Note: Cumulative sales figures for "Yayaya" in 2010 and 2011.) On December 12, 2010, broadcast of Mnet's M! Countdown, "Yayaya" won the first place spot. In Japan, the single debuted at number seven on Oricon's Weekly Singles chart selling over 31,000 copies. It charted 15 weeks. It also peaked at number six on the Billboard Japan Hot 100. Digitally, the song peaked at number 33 on RIAJ Digital Track Chart.

== Charts ==
Weekly chart peaks for "Yayaya"
Chart	Peak position
South Korea (Gaon)	5
Japan (Oricon)	7
Japan (Japan Hot 100)	6
Japan Digital (RIAJ)	33

== Sales ==
Sales for "Yayaya"
Country	Sales
South Korea	1,500,000 (Digital)
Japan	45,000 (Physical)

== Awards and nominations ==
Music show wins
Program	Date	Ref.
M Countdown	December 16, 2010	

== Track listing ==
CD
No.	Title	Lyrics	Music	Length
1.	"Yayaya" (Japanese Ver.)	Fujino Takafumi	E-Tribe	3:28
2.	"Roly Poly" (Korean Ver.)	Shinsadong Tiger, Choi Gyu Sung	Shinsadong Tiger, Choi Gyu Sung	3:36
3.	"Yayaya" (Inst.)			3:28
4.	"Roly Poly" (Inst.)			3:36
Total length:				14:08

DVD Type A
No.	Title	Length
1.	"Yayaya Music Video" (Japan Original ver.)
2.	"Yayaya Music Video" (Behind The scenes Ver.)

DVD Type B
No.	Title	Length
1.	"Yayaya Music Video" (Dance Feature ver.)
2.	"Yayaya Music Video" (Short ver.)

== Release history ==
Country	Date	Album	Distributing label	Format
South Korea	December 1, 2010	Temptastic	Mnet Media	Digital download
Japan	December 1, 2010	Yayaya	EMI Records	Digital download, CD
