= Kaze no Yō ni (song) =

- Limited edition cover

Single by QBS
- Language: Japanese
- Released: June 26, 2013
- Recorded: 2013
- Genre: J-pop
- Length: 8:34
- Label: MBK; EMI Music Japan
- Lyricist: Fukuda Satoshi
- Producer: Ikuta Magokoro

Music video
- "Kaze no Yō ni" on YouTube

"Kaze no Yō ni" (風のように; Like the Wind) is the debut Japanese single by South Korean girl group QBS, a sub-unit of T-ara. It was released on June 26, 2013, and was the only release from QBS.

== Composition ==
"Kaze no Yō ni" is described as a refreshing, upbeat pop song about a lover and her desire to be with her lover over a nostalgic melody.

== Promotion ==
To promote the single, QBS held a live show at the Sunshine City Fountain Square in Ikebukuro, Tokyo on June 10, 2013. The group performed "Kaze no Yō ni", along with Boram and Qri's duet "Shabontama no Yukue" (シャボン玉のゆくえ) and Soyeon's solo "Love Poem" (愛の詩) from T-ara's "Bunny Style!" single, in front of 2,000 fans. They also often had segments on other T-ara related Japanese programs, such as Daily T-ara.

== Commercial performance ==
The single debuted and peaked at number seven on the Oricon daily chart, it eventually fell to twenty-five by the end of the week. On the weekly chart, it reached number thirteen on the Oricon Weekly chart and charted for a total of four weeks.

The single peaked at number forty-six on the monthly chart with 9,046 copies sold, with a combined total of 11,570 copies sold.

== Track listing ==
Credits adapted from Tower Records

Regular Edition
No.	Title	Lyrics	Music	Length
1.	"Kaze no Yō ni (風のように)" (Like the Wind)	Fukuda Satoshi	Fukuda Satoshi	04:17
2.	"Kaze no Yō ni (風のように)" (Like the Wind) (Inst.)	Fukuda Satoshi	Fukuda Satoshi	04:17
Total length:				08:34

Limited Edition
No.	Title	Lyrics	Music	Length
1.	"Kaze no Yō ni (風のように)" (Like the Wind)	Fukuda Satoshi	Fukuda Satoshi	04:17
2.	"Kaze no Yō ni (風のように)" (Like the Wind) (Inst.)	Fukuda Satoshi	Fukuda Satoshi	04:17
3.	"Kaze no Yō ni (風のように)" (DVD) (Music Video)
Total length:				08:34

== Charts ==
Chart (2013)	Peak position
Japan Singles (Oricon)	7
Japan Hot 100 (Billboard)	12
Japan Singles Sales (Billboard)	9

== Release history ==
Region	Date	Format	Label
Japan	June 26, 2013	CD; Music download	MBK; EMI Records Japan
