= Moon Mason =

South Korean actor (born 2007)

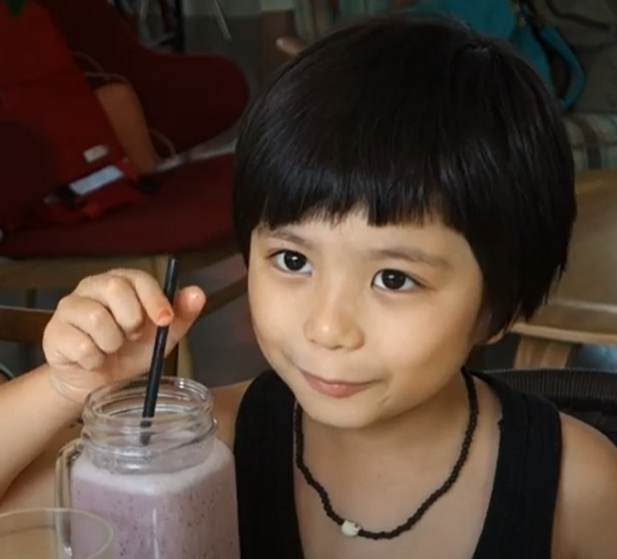
- Moon in 2013
- Born: Mason Moon Moorhouse; March 21, 2007 (age 18)
- Occupations: Actor, model
- Years active: 2007-present

Korean name
- Hangul: 문 메이슨
- RR: Mun Meiseun
- MR: Mun Meisŭn

Mason Moon Moorhouse (born March 21, 2007) is a South Korean actor and model. Following his acting debut as an infant in the movie Baby and I, he kept up media appearances by hosting a weekly TV show called Good Daddy and then began being called "Little Nichkhun", after the popular 2PM member. He was then in a TV series called 3 Suspicious Men, then in another TV series with his two younger brothers called Hello Baby, featuring T-ara as their caretakers. He has been a model for the Benetton Group fashion brand and was also chosen as the face of kid's brand R.ROBOT. In 2012 he appeared in his second movie, Love Clinique.

== Family ==
Moon's father, James Moorhouse, is Canadian.His mother, Moon Mi-Won, is South Korean. Moon and his two younger brothers Mavin Moon (born December 17, 2008) and Maden Moon (born December 18, 2009) are known as "the Moon Brothers".

== Career ==
=== Model ===
Moon has been a model since his traditional 100th day celebration in 2007. Prior to his 2008 movie Baby and I he was involved in an entertainment company and appeared in magazines. In 2010 Moon was a model for the Benetton Group fashion brand. In 2012 Moon was chosen as the face of kid's brand R.ROBOT.

=== Film ===
In June 2008 Moon started appearing alongside Jang Keun-suk in profile pictures and movie previews of his first film Baby and I, leading up to the August 2008 release. The father and son relationship depicted in the film has continued to be commented on by the media. In early 2009 Moon attended a press conference for child actors and was photographed crying. In November 2012 Moon made a cameo appearance in his second movie called Love Clinique/Tone Deaf Clinic. He also starred in the movie Making Family along with Ha-Nuel Kim and Aarif Rahman.

=== Little Nichkhun ===
From about April 2010 Moon's face started being compared to Nichkhun from the K-Pop boy band 2PM. After more than a year of being compared to Nichkhun, they met and posed together in July 2011.

=== Television ===
From November 2008 until January 2009 Moon hosted a weekly South Korean TV program called Good Daddy. In August and September 2010 Moon and his two younger brothers were in a South Korean TV program called 3 Suspicious Men. From November 2010 until February 2011 Moon and his two younger brothers were in a South Korean reality show called Hello Baby where celebrities experience parenthood by raising children ages 5 and under. The three brothers were cared for by K-pop girl group T-ara.

In 2012, Mason and his two younger brothers appeared alongside actor Lee Jung-ryong's two sons and seven other children in the "Children Channel: Popularity Battle" episodes of Shinhwa Broadcasting, hosted by six-member boyband Shinhwa.

In 2024, Moon starred alongside his three siblings in My Child's Private Life on ENA.

== Filmography ==
=== Film ===
- Baby and I (2008)
- Love Clinique/Tone Deaf Clinic (2012)
- Dear Lena (2016)
- Making Family (2016)

=== Television ===
- Good Daddy (2008)
- Hello Baby (2010)
- Children Channel: Popularity Battle (2012)
- My Child's Private Life (2024)
