= Jeon Boram =

South Korean singer and actress (born 1986)

Jeon Bo-ram
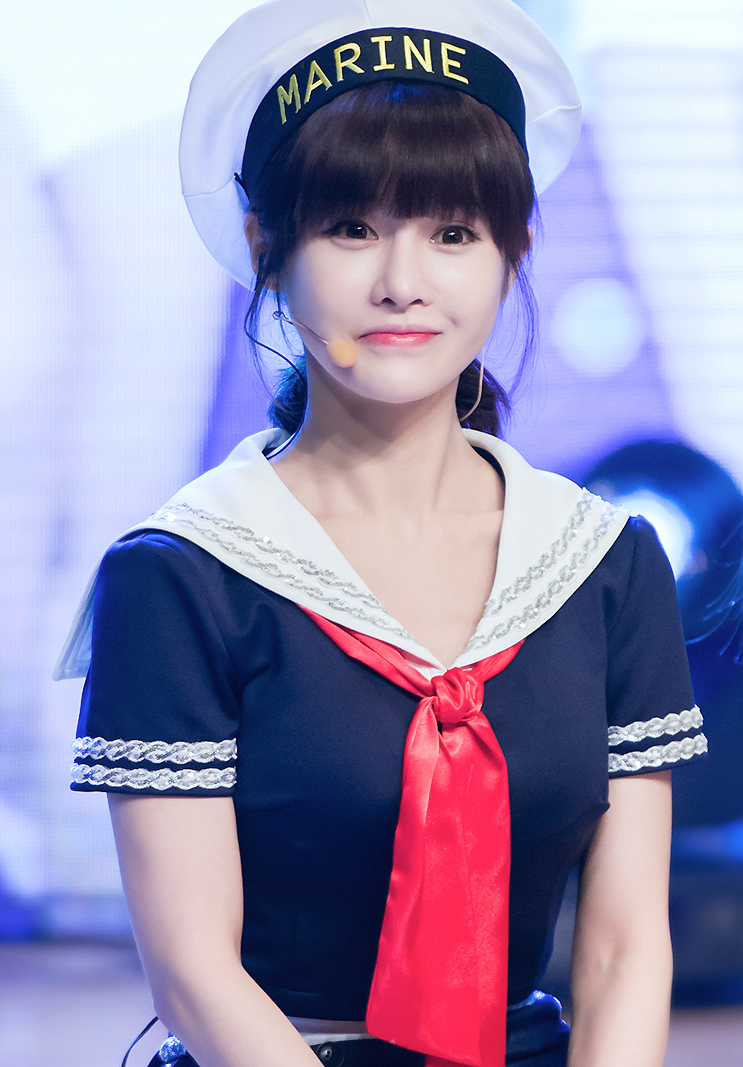
- Boram at the "So Crazy" Showcase in August 2015
- Born: March 22, 1986 (age 40); Seoul, South Korea
- Education: Myongji University (Bachelor of Arts in Theatre and Film)
- Occupations: Singer; actress; host
- Agent: JO Entertainment
- Parents: Lee Mi-young; Jeon Young-rok
- Relatives: Jeon Woo-ram (sister)
- Musical career
- Genre: K-pop
- Instrument: Vocals
- Years active: 2008–2019; 2023–present
- Formerly of: T-ara; QBS

Korean name
- Hangul: 전보람
- RR: Jeon Boram
- MR: Chŏn Poram

Jeon Bo-ram (Korean: 전보람; born March 22, 1986), referred to as Boram, is a South Korean singer, actress and host. She originally debuted as a solo artist, releasing two singles in 2008, before eventually becoming a member of girl group T-ara in 2009. The group went on to become one of the best-selling girl groups of all time.

Boram has been involved in multiple acting projects, notably dramas Soul (2009),Sweet Temptation (2015),The Angel Of Death Comes With Purple High Heels (2010), musicals I Really Really Like You (2009) and Lost Garden (2014), which became a hit in South Korea selling out all tickets.

== Early life ==
Jeon Bo-ram was born on March 22, 1986, in Seoul, South Korea. Her father is Jeon Young-rok, was popular singer in South Korea in the 1970s and 1980s. Her mother is Lee Mi-young, a well-known actress. She is a third-generation artist in Korea as both her grandfather, Hwang Hae, and grandmother, Baek Sul-hee, were both singers. Her younger sister, Jeon Woo-ram, is a member of D-Unit, under the stage name Ram.

Boram graduated with an Oriental Arts diploma from Anyang Arts High School. She later majored in Theatre and Film at Myongji University.

== Career ==
=== 2008–2010: Career beginnings ===
Boram released two experimental singles prior to her debut in T-ara. Her debut digital single "Is It Today" was released on April 15, 2008, in a single titled "Lucifer Project Vol 1. 愛". On November 14, 2008, she released her second digital single titled "From Memory". Both singles reached the Top 100 chart of South Korean online music platform MelOn. She later appeared on television series Star Golden Bell. She also starred in the 2002 movie The Romantic President and was a magazine model. Additionally, She appeared as a commercial model for The National Public Relations Agency (국정홍보처). In 2007, she starred in Kebee's "Feeling You" Music Video.

Boram was contacted by the CEO of Core Contents Media after he watched a video clip of her dancing to BoA's "My Name". In June 2009, she joined T-ara as a new member only a month before debut after members Jiae and Jiwon decided not to debut in the group.

=== 2010–2013: Acting debut and breakthrough ===
In 2009, Boram was chosen as special host for Sunday Night - Rich Artifacts. The same year, she was a special host for Mnet's M!Countdown. In August 2009, she was cast as Shin So-yi in the 2009 horror drama Soul. In 2010, she was cast as a lead in KBS's one-episode drama The Angel Of Death Comes With Purple High Heels. It recorded 5,1% in viewership, a 2,2% increase from the previous one, and became the second highest rated special drama of the year. The same year, she made an appearance on the drama Master of Study and the horror film Death Bell 2: Bloody Camp. In March 2010, she appeared on the omnibus drama Bubi Bubi. It was announced on July 15, 2010, that she would take over Eunjung's position as the second leader of T-ara, following the addition of new member Hwayoung. The leader is responsible for the group's dynamic as well as determining its artistic direction by meeting composers and stylists and participating directly in album concepts and styling. In December 2010, she was cast in the musical I Really Really Like You. In 2010, Boram filmed a commercial film for Cass beer alongside 2PM. She appeared in two of the group's promotional Music Videos for the commercial. Boram passed on her leadership to fellow member Hyomin in July 2011. In 2011, she made a cameo on the horror movie Ghastly. The same year she modeled for Crown Sando. In 2012, Boram was part of the main cast of Crown Princess show. She was also chosen as a special host on M!Countdown.

=== 2013–2016: QBS and The Lost Garden ===
Boram along with Qri and Soyeon formed a subgroup called QBS in May 2013. The subgroup focused on the Japanese market. They released their debut single titled "Like the Wind" on June 26, 2013. The single debuted at number 7 on Oricon's Weekly Singles Chart. The group held a mini-live tour in 3 cities in Japan. The Tokyo show, reportedly, was attended by more than 2,000 fans. The same year she was part of the variety show Wooram's Family Camp. She also modeled for OranC.

In 2014, Jeon starred in the musical adaptation of Oscar Wilde's The Selfish Giant as Mercy, a global project featuring a team from five nations. It ran from January 17, 2014, to February 16 at Yongin Poeun Art Hall in Yongin, Gyeonggi. The musical was a commercial success and sold out every showing, selling more than 11,000 tickets just two weeks into its staging. The musical was previously a hit in Shanghai, China selling over 20,000 tickets after three performances. It also made its festival debut at the 9th Daegu International Musical Festival; Korea's oldest and Asia's only Musical festival. In August 2015, she was in the web drama Sweet Temptation. The drama became one of Naver's most watched original shows. She also appeared on Davichi's Music Video for "Moment".

=== 2017–2019: Departure from T-ara, return to acting and hiatus ===
On March 6, 2017, MBK Entertainment (formerly Core Contents Media) announced that T-ara would be releasing their last album as a six-member group in May, after Boram and Soyeon decided not to renew their contracts, and other members decided to stay with the label until December 31, 2017. On May 7, MBK Entertainment revealed the group's plans had changed and that the group would disband following the release of the album and that the final album had been rescheduled to release in June 2017, with Boram and Soyeon not participating due to the expiry of their contracts. On May 8, it was announced that T-ara's last performance as six-members would be in a Taiwan concert on May 13.

In 2018, she appeared in a promotional video for Chinese brand Pinduoduo's. In September 2019, Boram was cast in MBN's Modern Family. She also starred in the web drama Shall We That's in 2019.

=== 2023–present: Solo activities in Japan ===
In August 2023, Boram announced that she would be active in Japan. On September 22, she officially opened her Japan fanclub with the fandom name "BORAM CHA". The same day, she was announced to host her own new radio show named Boram's Annyong Entertainment G!G!G! on Shibuya Cross FM. The show will reportedly include an "in-depth 50 minutes of Japanese and Korean fashion, gourmet food, cosmetics". In October 2023, Boram announced through her official website that she would hold her first talk events "~Gathering at Boram~" in Japan on October 12 and 29. This marks her first event as a solo. Boram went to hold six fan events in Japan from October 12, 2023 to February 23, 2024.

== Endorsements ==
Prior to her debut as a singer, Boram worked as a magazine model and served as a muse for various cosmetic brands including Luna Cosmetics. In 2006, she appeared as a CF model for The National Public Relations Agency (국정홍보처). In 2010, Boram filmed a CF for Cass beer alongside 2PM. In 2018, Boram appeared in a promotional video for make-up brand Moremo, which was advertised through the Chinese marketplace Pinduoduo's. The commercial featured several international figures, including Super Junior and Angelababy.

In 2012, The Voice of the People newspaper, reported that each of T-ara's member's individual advertising fee is around 400 million won, one of the highest in the industry.

== Philanthropy ==
In September 2014, Boram along with T-ara members donated 1,500 kilograms of rice "Dongducheon Angel" Movement. She personally delivered the donation to "Dongducheon Angel" Headquarters and held an additional fan-sign event to celebrate the Chuseok holiday with Qri and Hyomin.

== Discography ==
=== Singles ===
Year	Song title	Album	Notes
2008	"Is It Today"	Lucifer Project Vol 1. 愛	Pre-debut project
2008	"After That"	From Memory	Pre-debut project
2013	"Maybe Maybe"	Bunny Style!	
2013	"Bubble Soap"	Bunny Style!	

== Filmography ==
=== Film ===
Year	Title	Role	Notes	Ref.
2002	The Romantic President	Unknown	Cameo	
2010	Death Bell 2: Bloody Camp	Ji-ae	Cameo	
2011	Ghastly	Girl in the club	Cameo	

=== Television series ===
Year	Title	Role	Notes	Ref.
2009	Soul	Shin So-yi	Supporting Role	
2010	Master of Study	Bully student	Cameo	
2010	The Angel Of Death Comes With Purple High Heels	Ah-mi	Main Role	

=== Web series ===
Year	Title	Role	Notes	Ref.
2010	Bubi Bubi	Herself	Main Role	
2015	Sweet Temptation	Youn-hee	Main Role	
2019	Shall We That's	Joohee Han	Main Role	

=== Variety shows ===
Year	Title	Role	Notes	Ref.
2009	Sunday Night - Rich Artifacts	Special Host		
2009	M! Countdown	Special Host	K-Chart announcer	
2010	Brothers and Sisters	Cast	Lunar New Year special	
2012	Crown Princess show	Main cast	Lunar New Year special	
2012	M! Countdown	Special Host		
2013	Wooram's Family Camp	Main cast		
2019	Do You Eat?	Host		

=== Radio shows ===
Year	Title	Role	Ref.
2023	Boram's Annyong Entertainment G! G! G!	Host	

=== Music video appearances ===
Year	Song	Artist	Album	Ref.
2007	"Feeling You"	Kebee	Poetree Syndrome	
2010	"Tik Tok"	2PM	Non-album single	
2010	"Tik Tok" (Drama Ver.)	2PM	Non-album single	
2015	"Moment"	Davichi	Sweet Temptation OST	

=== Musical ===
Year	Title	Role	Notes	City	Country	Dates	Venue	Ref.
2010–2011	I Really Really Like You	Bo-ram	Main Role	Seoul	South Korea	December 17, 2010 – February 6, 2011	Mapo Arts Center	
2014	The Lost Garden Musical	Mercy	Main Role	Yongin	South Korea	January 17, 2014 – February 16, 2014	Yongin Poeun Art Hall	

=== Advertisements ===
Year	Brand	Notes	Ref.
2007	The National Public Relations Agency		
2008	Luna Cosmetics		
2010	CASS beer	With 2PM & Yoon Eun-hye	
2011	Crown Sando		
2013	OranC		
2018	Pinduoduo's	In China	

== Live performances ==
=== Fan meetings ===
Year	Date	Title	Country	City	Venue	Ref.
2023	October 12, 2023	Gathering at Boram <Talk>	Japan	Tokyo	Kitazawa Sky Hall Lounge	
2023	October 29, 2023	Gathering at Boram <Talk>	Japan	Tokyo	Kitazawa Sky Hall Lounge	
2023	November 11, 2023	Gathering at Boram <Talk>	Japan	Tokyo	Time Sharing Gotanda	
2023	November 25, 2023	Gathering at Boram <Talk>	Japan	Tokyo	Time Sharing Gotanda	
2023	December 20, 2023	"New Me" Live Show & Talk	Japan	Tokyo	Shibuya Take off7	
2024	February 23, 2024	Special Fun Event & Talk	Japan	Tokyo	Kitazawa Sky Hall Lounge	
2025	October 12, 2025	Boram Cha Times	Japan	Tokyo	W:IKE329	
2026	April 25, 2026	Boram Birthday Fan Concert	Japan	Tokyo	W:IKE329	

=== Joint concerts ===
Year	Date	Event	City	Country	Performed Songs	Ref.
2010	December 26, 2010	KBS Concert 7080	Seoul	South Korea	"Wind, Stop! " (cover)	
2015	March 8, 2015	Jeon Young-rok 40th Anniversary Concert	Seoul	South Korea	Unknown	

=== TV shows and specials ===
Year	Date	Show	Performed Songs	Notes
2010	September 22, 2010	Idol Star Trot Match	"Seoul Trot" (cover)	Chuseok special program
2010	December 26, 2010	Concert 7080	"Wind, Stop! " (cover)	

== Accolades ==
=== Awards and nominations ===
Award ceremony	Year	Category	Nominee / work	Result	Ref.
Sweet Girl Contest	2010	First Place Winner	Herself	Won	
Spot World Premium Awards	2016	Best Hit Product	Yeouido Hotel Design	Won	

=== Listicles ===
Publisher	Year	List	Placement	Ref.
Forbes China	2017	Global Idol Chinese Popularity Ranking	42nd	
