= T-ara =

South Korean girl group

- T-ara in October 2026; From left to right: Qri, Eunjung, Hyomin, Jiyeon

Background information
- Origin: Seoul, South Korea
- Genres: K-pop; dance-pop; nu-disco; electropop; synth-pop
- Years active: 2009–2017; 2020–present
- Labels: MBK; Dingo; EMI Japan; Banana Culture
- Spinoffs: T-ara N4; QBS
- Members: Qri; Eunjung; Hyomin; Jiyeon
- Past members: Jiae; Jiwon; Hwayoung; Areum; Boram; Soyeon

T-ara (/tiˈɑːrə/; Korean: 티아라) is a South Korean girl group formed in 2009, currently consisting of four members: Qri, Eunjung, Hyomin, and Jiyeon. T-ara's career is marked by hook-heavy dance-pop music, a result of their close partnership with composer Shinsadong Tiger. They have been referred to as the "Chameleons of K-pop" for their versatile concepts and experimentation with musical genres. (Note: "Girl group T-ara's new song won't be an unusual and comical image but more of a feminine and calm concept. It is different from the image T-ara used to emphasize on so it's awkward but it is a strategy to use an ordinary concept that differentiates them from others. But then again, after T-ara debuted in 2009, they did kitten, robot, Native Americans and many different concepts and choreography.") The group achieved commercial success in several regions in Asia including South Korea and China, and their single "Roly-Poly" (2011) became one of the most downloaded domestic singles since 2011 and the most downloaded girl group single to date.

T-ara made their debut with the single "Lies" in 2009. Their debut studio album Absolute First Album (2009) was well received critically and spawned the hit singles "TTL (Time to Love)", "Bo Peep Bo Peep", and "You Drive Me Crazy". Both their debut Japanese single and studio album reached number one on the Oricon weekly charts and were subsequently certified gold. They subsequently gained nationwide recognition after releasing "Roly-Poly" (2011) which went on to become the Gaon chart's best-selling single of the year. T-ara signed onto Japanese management agency J-Rock for $4.7 million—reportedly the highest figure of any Korean girl group expanding into the territory at the time. T-ara's Korean EP Black Eyes (2011) spawned three consecutive number ones: "Cry Cry", "We Were in Love" and "Lovey-Dovey".

In 2012, T-ara experienced a dip in popularity as the group faced accusations of internal discord, resulting in Hwayoung's immediate departure with Areum following a year after. T-ara's later material was released to varying degrees of success before the group began focusing on promotional activities in China, where they attracted attention for their cover of Chopstick Brothers "Little Apple" (2014). T-ara's final release as six members was tentatively scheduled for May 2017, ahead of Soyeon and Boram's expiring contracts. However, conflicts with their management delayed What's My Name? until June 2017, effectively ending their involvement. After a four-year hiatus, T-ara reunited and released their first independent single album, Re:T-ara, in 2021. Today, the group is still active through numerous concerts and festival appearances. T-ara have sold 1.14 million albums and over 35 million digital singles as of 2020, making them among the best-selling girl groups.

== Name ==
T-ara's logo for Absolute First Album. The crown symbol here is often considered their official logo.

The group's name, T-ara, is based on the English word for "tiara". The name T-ara stems from the idea that they will become the "queens of the music industry". This later inspired their official fandom name, Queen's.

== History ==
=== 2009–2010: Formation, debut and breakthrough ===
The original pre-debut five T-ara members (Jiae, Jiwon, Eunjung, Hyomin and Jiyeon) trained together for nearly three years under Mnet Media. In April 2009, they released their pre-debut song "Good Person" for the Cinderella Man soundtrack. The song is a remake of SG Wannabe's soundtrack of the same name. It climbed into the top fifty on various streaming platforms, as well as topping multiple soundtrack charts. Jiyeon teamed up with labelmates SeeYa and Davichi for a collaboration single titled "Women's Generation", which was released in May 2009. The single achieved nationwide success and became the group's first Top three single on the charts.

In June 2009, Mnet Media announced that Jiae and Jiwon would be leaving T-ara due to differences in music style. The first new member to be added was Boram, the daughter of singer Jeon Young-rok and actress Lee Mi-young, who was contacted a month before debut after the CEO of Core Contents Media watched a video clip of her dancing to BoA's "My Name". She had previously released two singles as a solo artist to moderate success, and was also an actress and magazine model. Three weeks before debut, Soyeon, a former SM Entertainment trainee originally slated to be a main vocalist and leader of Girls' Generation, and Qri, a popular Ulzzang at the time, were added to T-ara. In early July 2009, the group was moved from Mnet Media to its subsidiary company Core Contents Media.

T-ara made their debut on MBC's Radio Star talk show on July 29, 2009, which was unusual for Korean artists who usually debuted on music programs instead. They made their debut performance on Mnet's M Countdown on July 30, performing their debut single "Lies", along with its B-side, "Wanna Play?". On July 30, CCM announced that just one day after debut, the group had already received 13 invitations to appear on variety shows. All tracks from the single entered the top 100 charts on online streaming platforms, with "Lies", peaking at number five on MelOn.

In September 2009, Eunjung, Soyeon, Hyomin and Jiyeon collaborated with labelmates Kwangsu, Jihyuk, and Geon-il of Supernova for the single "TTL (Time to Love)". Released on September 15, 2009, it became the first number-one song on all Korean online charts for both groups . T-ara and Supernova teamed up again for "TTL Listen 2", an alternate version of "TTL", featuring all members from both groups, which was released on October 9, 2009.

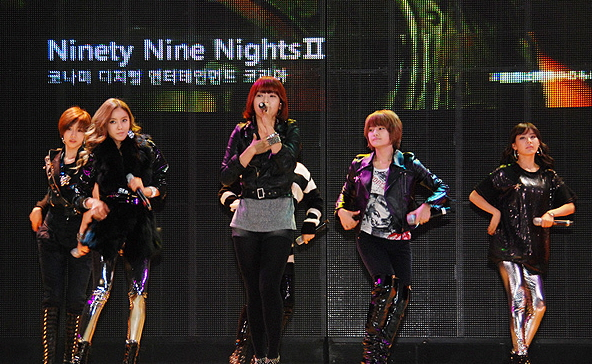
T-ara performing at the Xbox 360 Invitational in 2009

T-ara released their debut studio album, Absolute First Album, on November 27, 2009. In order to determine the album's title track, Core Contents Media held a survey in which the public had to choose between "Bo Peep Bo Peep" or "Like the First Time". 9,000 people took the survey on various music portals with 53% (4,770 people) choosing "Like The First Time" over "Bo Peep Bo Peep". However, the latter was promoted on music shows instead for unknown reasons. "Bo Peep Bo Peep" peaked at number four on the Gaon chart, while "Like The First" peaked at number ten. They held their comeback performance on Music Bank on December 4, 2009. At the 24th Golden Disk Awards, T-ara was awarded Rookie of the Year.

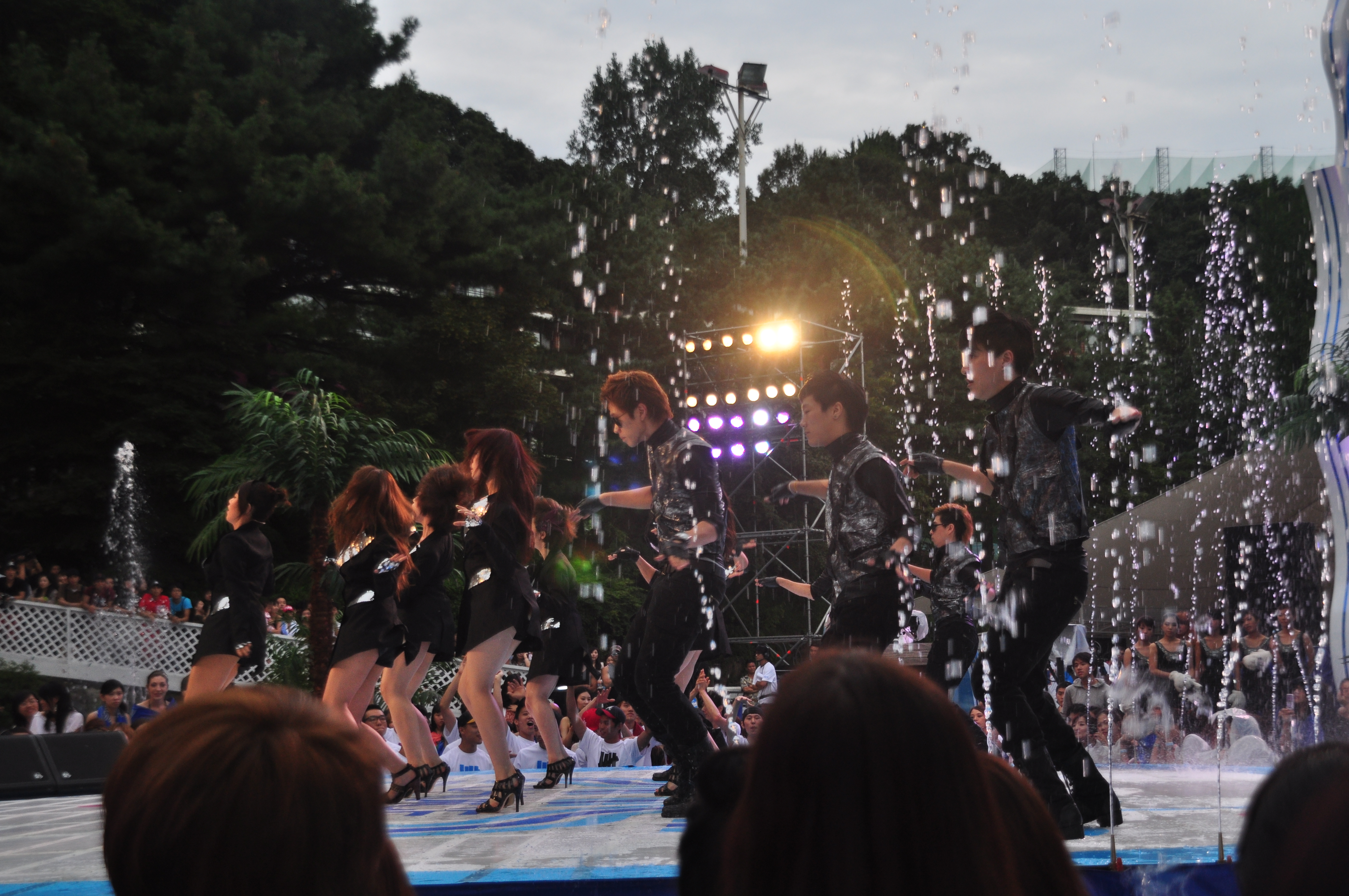
T-ara performing at the Mnet 20's Choice Awards in 2010

The group won their first music show award with "Bo Peep Bo Peep" on the New Year's Day episode of Music Bank. The song went on to win five awards in total: two on Music Bank and three on Inkigayo, earning them their first "Triple Crown". Later in January 2010, the group announced promotions for their B-side track, "Like The First Time", which ended quickly as Soyeon was diagnosed with H1N1. The same month, T-ara made a cameo appearance on the seventh and eight episodes of God of Study, in which Jiyeon played a main role.

In February 2010, the group announced a re-release of their debut album under the title Breaking Heart. The lead single, "You Drive Me Crazy" and B-side track "I'm Really Hurt", were digitally released on February 23, 2010, and peaked at number one and number thirty-one on the Gaon chart, respectively. T-ara won two consecutive Mutizen awards on Inkigayo for "You Drive Me Crazy" and one on M Countdown. "You Drive Me Crazy" became the third best-selling girl group song of the year. Several other T-ara tracks also appeared on Gaon's year-end singles chart. Breaking Heart was released physically on March 3, 2010, peaking at number two on the weekly Gaon chart and number thirty-five on the yearly chart. After promotions for "You Drive Me Crazy" ended, T-ara performed "I'm Really Hurt" on music shows until early April 2010. On July 16, 2010, T-ara's representatives announced the addition of Ryu Hwa-young as the seventh member of the group. The reason given was that with so many solo projects, they would be able to have a more complete lineup for T-ara when individual members were filming or doing other appearances. They also stated that it would allow the members to undertake more solo activities, and would give them all some relief from their heavy schedules.

In November 2010, the group appeared in the third season of the reality show Hello Baby, where they took care of Moon Mason and his two brothers. T-ara released "Wae Ireoni", the lead single for their first extended play, Temptastic, on November 23, 2010. The single peaked at number four on Gaon's weekly digital chart and at number two on the download chart. It sold over 1.7 million digital copies by 2011. Temptastic was released in digital format on December 1, 2010, along with their second single, "Yayaya". The album's physical release was delayed until December 3 due to the bombardment of Yeonpyeong earlier in November 2010. T-ara received two consecutive wins for "Wae Ireoni" and "Yayaya" on M Countdown.

=== 2011–2012: International expansion and bullying controversy ===
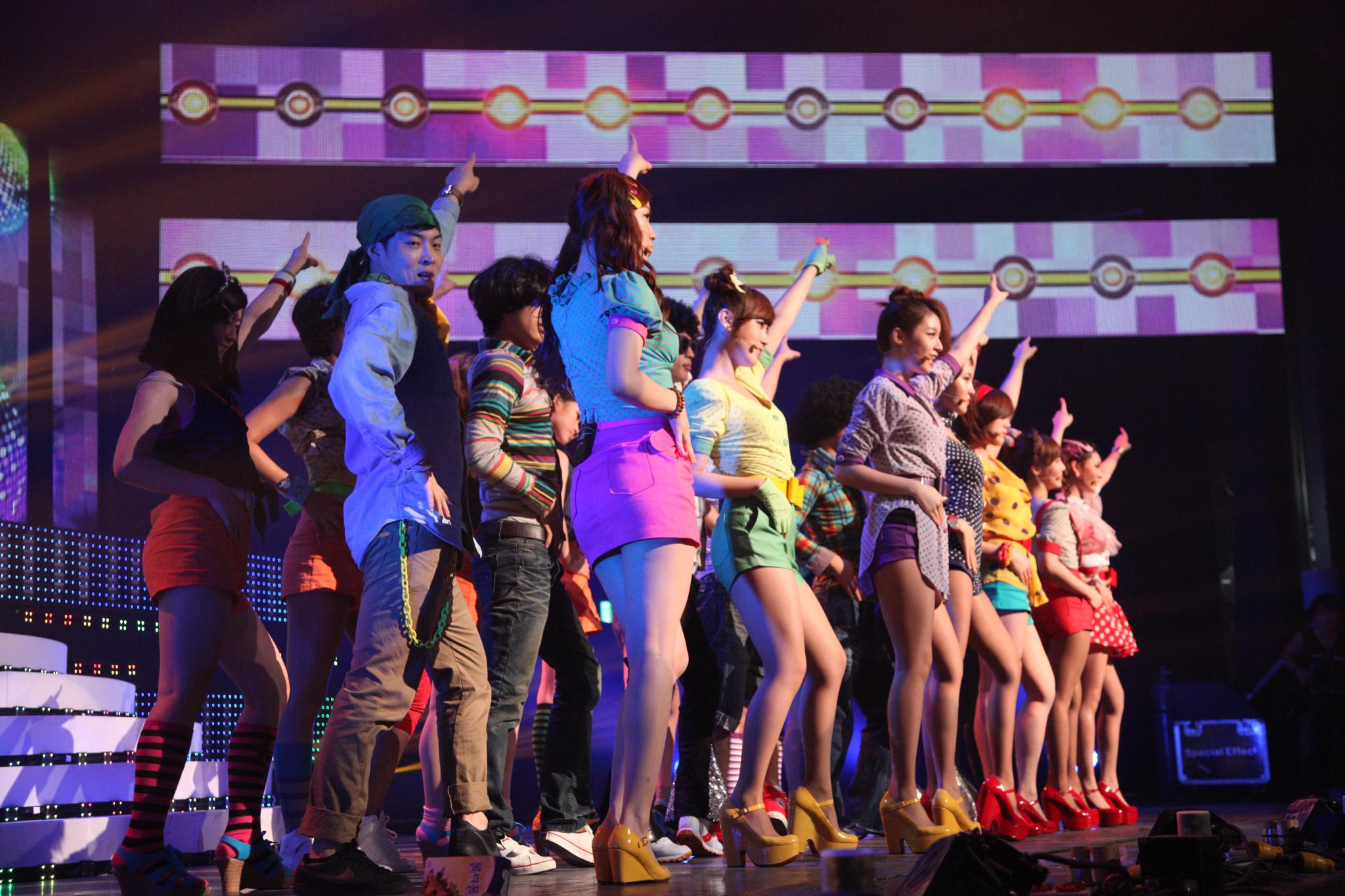
T-ara performing "Roly-Poly" at the Cyworld Music Festival in 2011

T-ara's second EP John Travolta Wannabe was released on June 29, 2011. It charted at number three on the Gaon Album Chart and sold 30,116 copies in 2011. The EP's only single, "Roly-Poly", peaked at number two on the Gaon Digital Chart and number one on the Korea K-Pop Hot 100 chart. It became a breakthrough hit, topping South Korea's charts in 2011 as the top-grossing and highest-selling release of the year, with over four million digital units sold. "Roly-Poly" was awarded Best Music Video at the 3rd Melon Music Awards, Singer of the Year (July) at the 1st Gaon Chart Awards, and was nominated Best Dance Performance by a Female Group and Song of the Year at the 13th Mnet Asian Music Awards.

The group released a limited edition re-issue of John Travolta Wannabe, titled Roly-Poly in Copacabana, on August 2, 2011. It featured an alternate version of "Roly Poly". "Roly-Poly in Copacabana", a Eurodance remix of the hit, was named after the song "Copacabana", which was popularized in the 80's in Jongno disco clubs. The album peaked at number three on the Gaon chart. T-ara released their debut Japanese single "Bo Peep Bo Peep" on September 28, which peaked at number one on the Oricon weekly singles chart with nearly 50 thousand copies sold, making them the first non-Japanese girl group to top the chart with a debut single in Oricon history. The single peaked at number one on the Billboard Japan Hot 100, and was certified Gold by the Recording Industry Association of Japan for both full-length cellphone downloads and PC downloads.

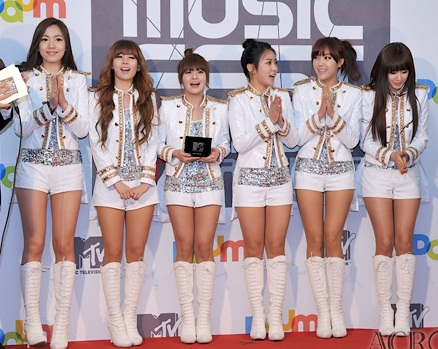
T-ara at the MTV Daum Music Fest in 2011

In November 2011, T-ara released their third extended play Black Eyes which charted at number two on the Gaon charts. The album was preceded by the release of "Cry Cry", which peaked at number one on both the Billboard Korea K-Pop Hot 100 and Gaon's weekly singles, and won two consecutive first-place awards on M Countdown. The music video for "Cry Cry" was noted for having a billion South Korean won production budget and a thirty-minute drama story line. The group released their second Japanese single, a remake of "Yayaya" from their Temptastic EP, on November 30. The single peaked at number seven on the Oricon charts and number six on the Billboard Japan Hot 100.

In December 2011, Core Contents Media announced that T-ara's third leader Hyomin would be passing on her leadership to Soyeon. The group performed a three-day mini-concert tour titled X-mas Premium Live, that was held at the Shinagawa Stella Hall in Tokyo, Zepp in Nagoya, and Zepp in Osaka. T-ara rose to become the second biggest girl group in Korea in 2011 by ranking at number eight on the Gallup Korea poll. T-ara and Davichi released their Christmastide ballad, "We Were in Love" on December 23, 2011. It was later included on T-ara's Funky Town re-release album. The single reached number one on the Gaon Chart and peaked at number two on the Billboard Korea K-Pop Hot 100. In November 2011, CCM announced that T-ara will not be attending any year-end award ceremonies due to their heavy schedules in and outside South Korea, which resulted in the group's immediate elimination from most of the country's award nomination lists.

T-ara re-released Black Eyes under the title Funky Town on January 3, 2012. The album peaked at number one on the Gaon weekly album chart and number two on the monthly album chart, selling 76.000 copies. "Lovey-Dovey" was released as the album's title track, which peaked at number one on both the Gaon and Billboard Korea K-pop Hot 100 charts. The single has sold more than 3 million digital copies in South Korea alone. In February, Forbes Korea, in celebration of their ninth year of establishment, reported the year's list of the "Top 40 Power Celebrities". T-ara ranked on the list at number seventeen, thus making them as the third most powerful girl group and the seventh most powerful female celebrity in Korea.

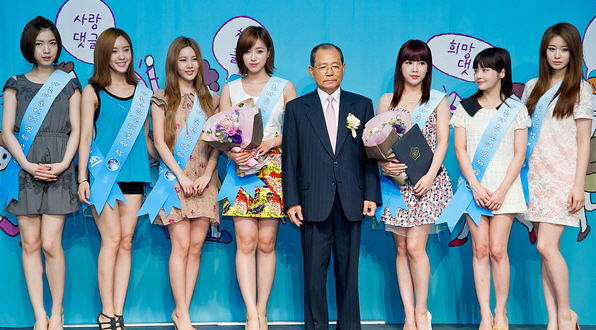
T-ara as SNS ambassadors for AINSE at the 2012 Create a Beautiful Internet World ceremony

On June 14, 2012, Core Contents Media introduced 18-year-old Areum as the new maknae (막내, youngest member). On May 23, T-ara released "Round & Round", a remake of Nami's 1984 hit. The song received commercial success becoming the group's seventh top ten hit in South Korea since 2010. It received generally positive reviews from critics praising T-ara for bringing it a new fresh sound. It was selected by SPIELTIMES as one of the best K-Pop remakes.

The group released their first Japanese album Jewelry Box on June 6, 2012. It debuted at number two on the Oricon weekly albums chart with sales of over 57,000 copies. The album was later certified Gold by RIAJ for physical sales shipments. They embarked on their first Japanese concert tour T-ara Japan Tour 2012: Jewelry Box in Nagoya on June 19. The tour's attendance was expected to exceed 40,000 people. On July 3, T-ara released their fourth extended play, Day by Day, which charted at number five on the Gaon chart. The title track, "Day by Day", was released on the same day, peaking at number two. The first comeback performance for "Day by Day" was held on July 7, 2012, on Music Core, which was backed by a 70-person orchestra and featured the stage debut of the group's eighth member, Areum.

On July 25–26, T-ara held a concert in Japan where Hwayoung performed only one song due to an alleged leg injury. Afterward, Hyomin tweeted, "There are differences in levels of determination. Let us have more determination," which the other members supported. Hwayoung responded, "Sometimes, even determination alone is not enough..God, you know everything right?". Her sister Hyoyoung added, "My better half is suffering. My heart hurts.". These tweets led to speculation of conflict within the group, which caused a major controversy and backlash against the members.

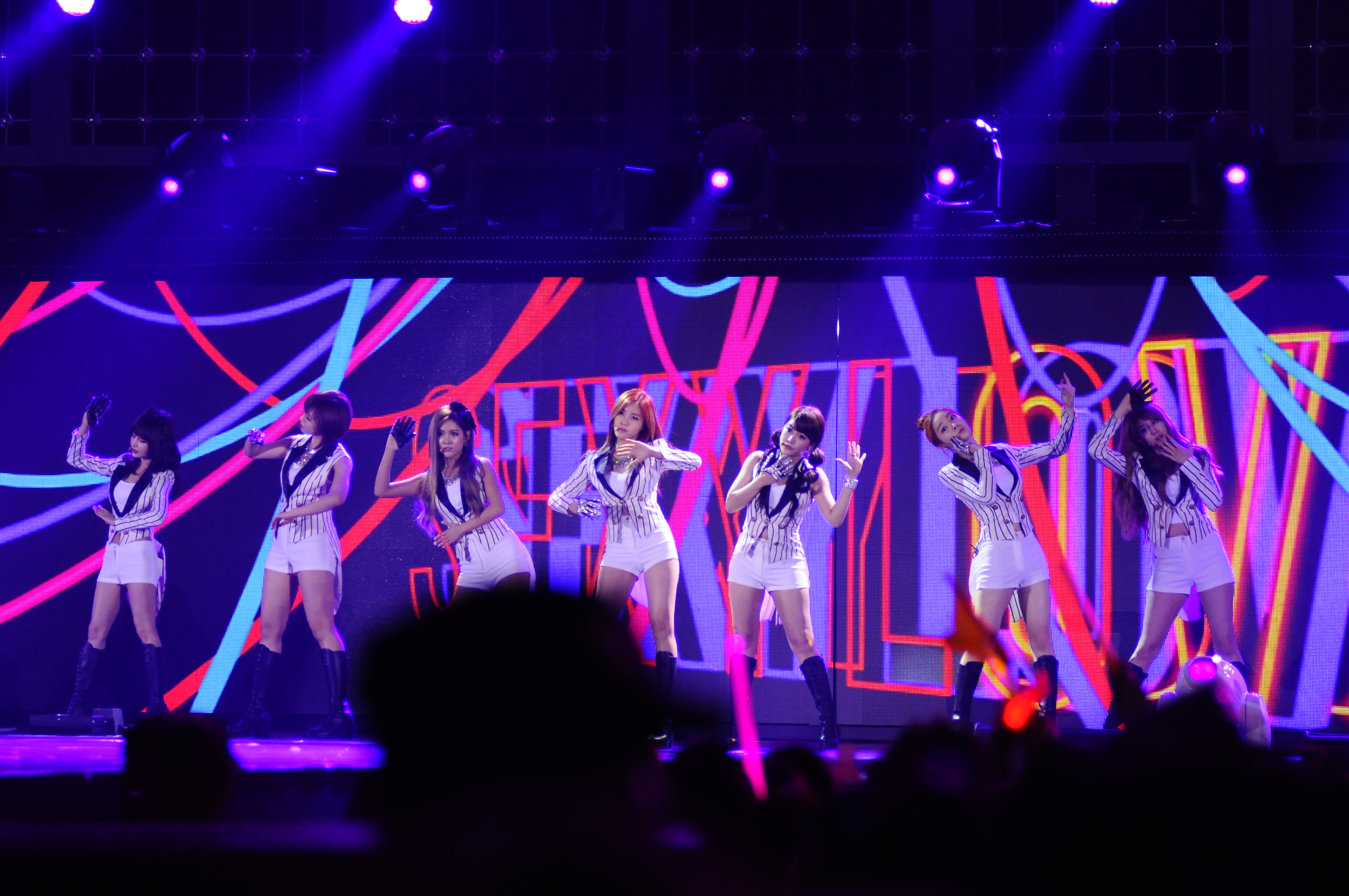
T-ara performing in Hanoi, Vietnam in November 2012

On July 30, Core Contents Media announced Hwayoung's departure after 1 year and 8 months, citing staff complaints and denying the bullying rumors. Despite both sides stating there was no bullying, public opinion overwhelmingly supported Hwayoung, leading to T-ara temporarily suspending activities.

It was announced that there would be no changes to T-ara's upcoming comeback. However, CCM later took the statement back and announced that their comeback would be postponed indefinitely. Their Day by Day extended play re-issue, Mirage, was eventually released on September 3, 2012. The title track "Sexy Love" and the promotional singe "Day and Night", were released from the album on the same day, with "Sexy Love" peaking at number four on the Gaon charts and number three on the Billboard Korea K-pop Hot 100 charts. "Day and Night" was a collaboration single featuring T-ara's Areum with Gun-ji of Gavy NJ and Shannon.

On September 10, 2012, it was announced that the group would release a best of album in Japan consisting of all of their Korean singles to date (excluding "Day by Day" and "Sexy Love") in celebration of one year since their Japanese debut. The album was eventually released on October 10. On September 26, T-ara released the Japanese version of "Day by Day", which is mainly composed of scenes from their Korean music videos for that song. In October, T-ara released the Japanese version of "Sexy Love" and shortly after, the group departed to Japan to promote for their upcoming single.

In September 2012, T-ara was offered ₩10 billion in funding for an Asia tour including China, Hong Kong, Indonesia, Vietnam, Thailand, Singapore and Malaysia. With 20 stops, the tour was set with concerts in arenas with 10,000–20,000 seats adding up to over 150,000 in total attendance.

=== 2013–2014: Subunits, Again, and And & End ===
T-ara released their sixth Japanese single "Bunny Style!" on March 20, 2013. It is their first single composed specifically for the Japanese market. It featured a solo song by each one of the members. To promote the single, the group held special showcases in 10 Japanese cities, starting on February 20, 2013, and ending on March 9, 2013. The tour reportedly attracted 100,000 attendees. The single was later nominated for Single of the Year at the 2013 Tower Records Awards. On April 1, 2013, T-ara's Japanese label, EMI Music Japan, was absorbed into Universal Music Japan, became defunct as a company and was renamed to EMI Records Japan. All of T-ara's further Japanese promotions were to be done through Universal Music Japan.

In early April 2013, it was announced that T-ara would be forming a sub-unit with members Eunjung, Hyomin, Jiyeon, and Areum called T-ara N4, short for 'T-ara Brand New 4'. The sub-unit debuted on April 29, 2013, with the song "Jeon Won Diary", produced by Duble Sidekick. T-ara performed at the Nippon Budokan on July 13, 2013, to celebrate the release of their second Japanese album Treasure Box due August 7, 2013. The title for Treasure Box was revealed on June 15, 2013, along with the album's track list of thirteen songs. The group's concept for the album was "treasure hunting" (宝探し; "takarasagashi"). T-ara released "Painkiller" as a digital single. It was a collaboration with Davichi, The SeeYa, 5dolls and Speed. Jiyeon appeared as the main character in the music video.

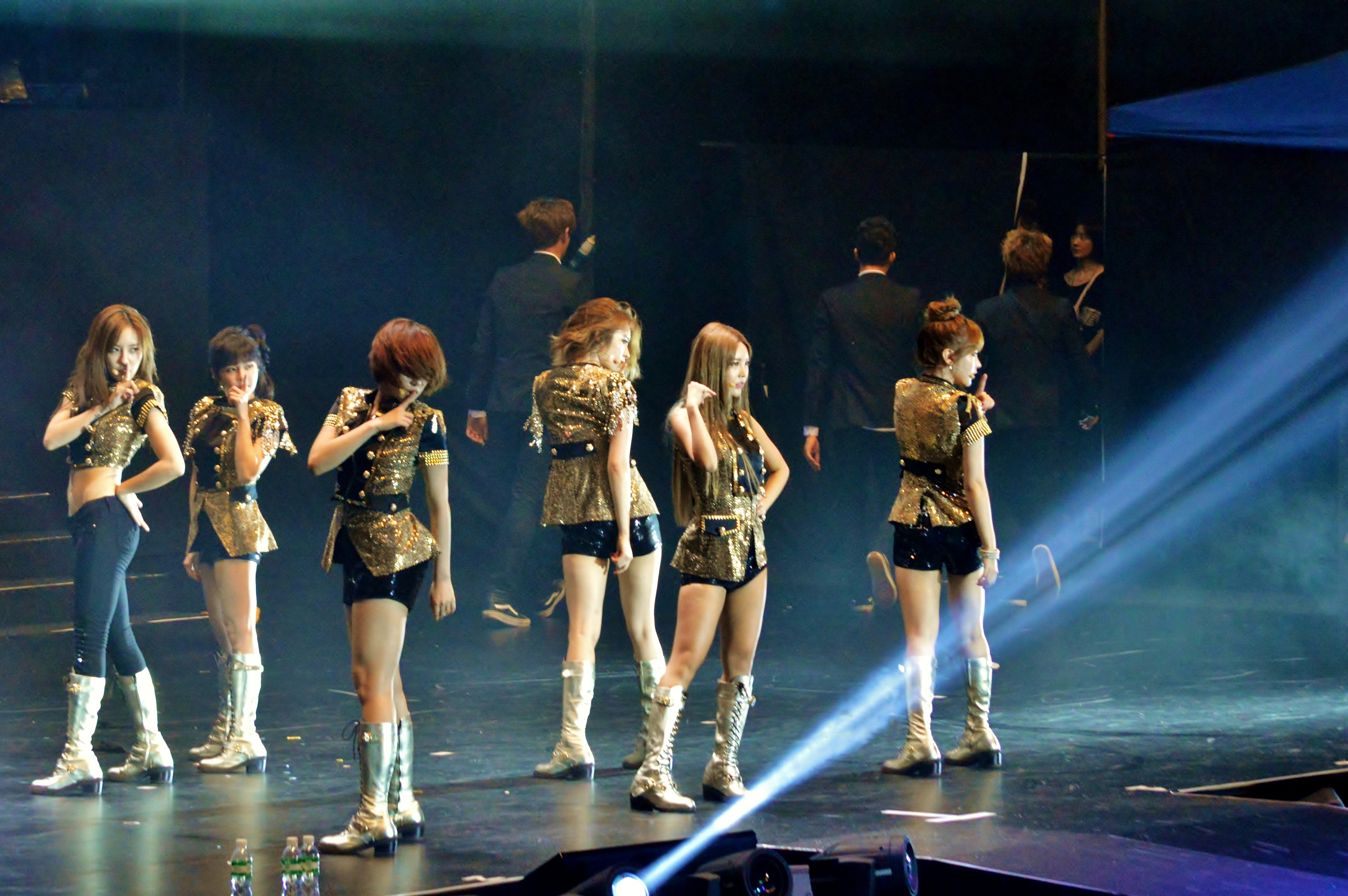
T-ara performing at It's T-ara's Time Live in Hong Kong 2013

On July 10, 2013, it was confirmed with a video released by CCM that Areum would be leaving the group to pursue a solo career "towards the beginning of next year". At their Budokan Concert, it was announced that Qri would be the new leader of T-ara. On September 15, Core Contents Media announced that T-ara would hold their long-awaited Korean comeback on October 10. Before their comeback, T-ara, together with Davichi, SPEED and The SeeYa held a concert in Mongolia, which attracted a crowd of 20,000 people. On October 6, T-ara performed "Number 9" for the first time at the Hallyu Dream Concert along with "Sexy Love". "Number Nine" was released with T-ara's mini album Again on October 10.The Japanese version of "Number Nine" was released on 20 November 2013. The single topped the weekly USEN chart in Japan. "You Gave Me Guidance", a track from the single, was chosen as the soundtrack for the Japanese movie Jinx!!!.

T-ara had a Korean comeback on December 2 with a repackage of Again, named Again 1977. It featured the bonus track "Do You Know Me", along with a ballad version of the song. Their concept for this comeback and music video was broadway-inspired with retro style. On December 13, T-ara released a Christmas song, "Hide & Seek". T-ara was ranked seventh as the group with most number one hit songs on digital music charts in the past decade with 13 songs, despite debuting 4.5 years ago. Reportedly, the group made over US$18.5 million in revenue in 2013 alone, ranking second among girl group, behind Girls' Generation and 6th overall among South Korean artists.

On January 19, 2014, T-ara had their second concert in Chengdu, China, one out of five concerts they planned to stage in China the same year. On February 14, T-ara held a joint concert with label-mates Speed in Phnom Penh, Cambodia which attracted over 3,000 fans. On 19 February CCM released a music video for a promotional track from Cho Young Soo's All Star Project with the single titled as "First Love" sung by Hyomin, Jiyeon and Soyeon featuring rapper EB. T-ara had a Japanese comeback with the single "Lead The Way" on March 5, and their third Japanese album Gossip Girls was released on May 14.

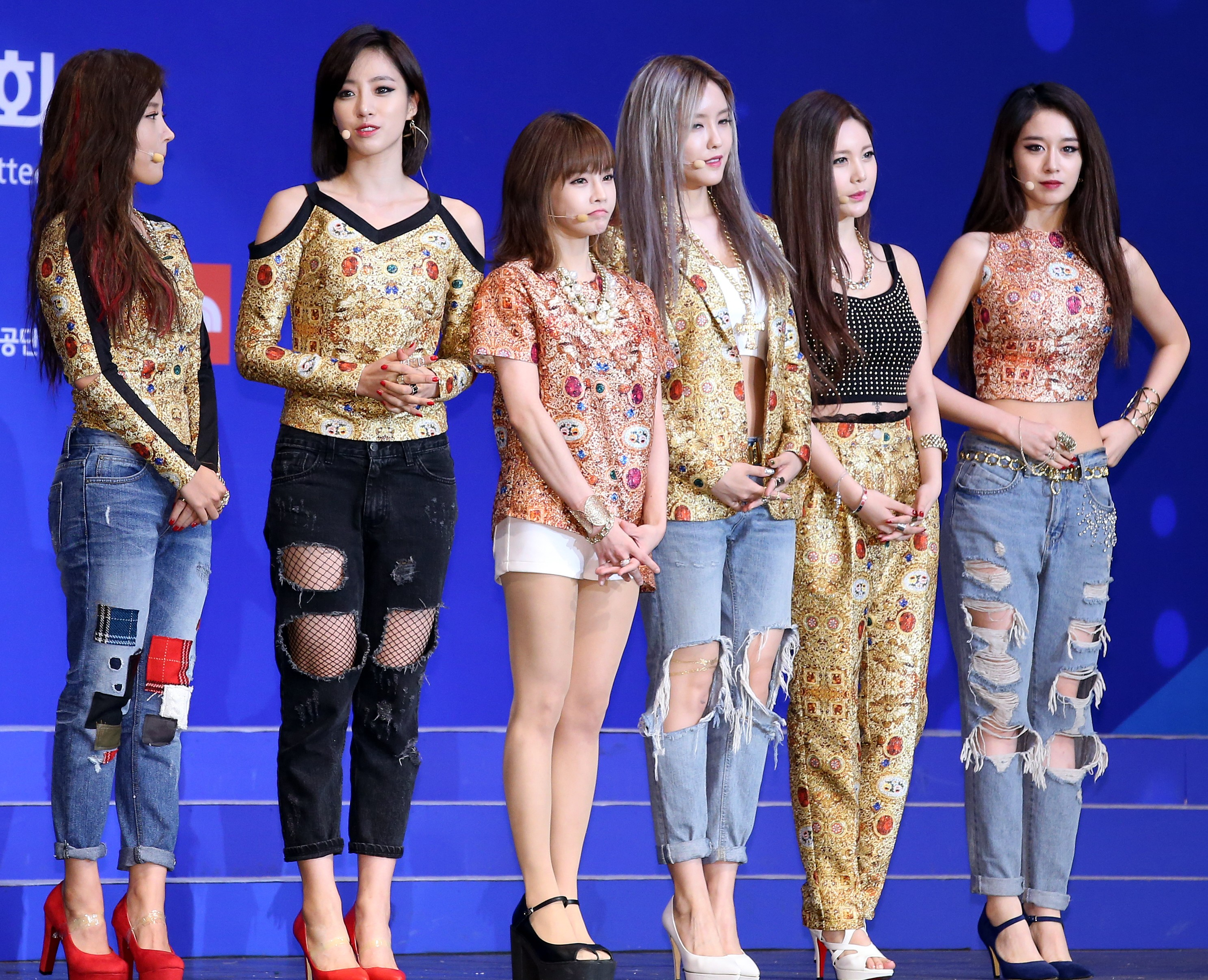
T-ara on stage during the launch ceremony for Team Korea on September 11, 2014, at Olympic Park, Songpa-gu, Seoul

On September 11, T-ara's sixth mini album And & End was released along with the music video for the title track "Sugar Free" and three other alternate versions of the video. The song was inspired by EDM and is part of the Big Room subgenre of electro house music. On September 24, a remix album was released called EDM CLUB Sugar Free Edition. It included an English version of "Sugar Free", the first song T-ara had recorded in English. On October 13, T-ara became the first South Korean girl group to sign with a Chinese management company. The group signed a 5 billion KRW (~US$4.8 million) contract with Longzhen Culture Development. A press conference was held in Beijing to commemorate the event while over 100 media outlets have applied to cover it. The company estimated that the group would bring over 16 billion KRW (~US$15.4 million) in yearly profit. On November 24, T-ara released a Korean cover of "Little Apple" by Chopstick Brothers, as well as a music video. It featured Jiyeon, Eunjung, Qri, and Hyomin, as well as Seunghee from F-ve Dolls and Dani. The video hit ́8 millions views in only a day and a half on Tudou, China's largest video sharing platform at the time. The song also topped Tudou's music chart. On December 25, T-ara held their first domestic concert named "Dear My Family" at COEX Auditorium in Seoul. In order to be close with fans and spend a meaningful time with them, the concert was small with 1,100 seats. On December 27, T-ara held their concert in Shanghai as the beginning stop of their China tour.

=== 2015–2016: So Good, Remember and Great China Tour ===
After their first concert in Korea, T-ara headed to Vietnam for a Fan meeting. On January 9, the group arrived at the airport, where problems occurred which resulted in scheduling changes. Nevertheless, the group's fan meeting, which took place on October 10, drew in more than 3,000 Vietnamese fans. On February 7, 2015, T-ara's Eunjung and Soyeon and labelmastes Cho Seunghee, Minkyung (The SeeYa), Ki-O, Jongkook and Sejun (SPEED) released a special winter single named "TS" with the track "Don't Forget Me".

In March 2015, it was announced that T-ara would be the main performer for Malaysia's Sultan of Johor Coronation celebrations in Johor Bahru. The event attracted 50,000 audience. On June 20, 2015, T-ara began their first China tour "Great China Tour" starting from Nanjing, Beijing and Hefei. It was the first concert held by T-ara after signing with their new agency Banana Plan, who manages their Chinese promotions. The group performed 22 songs and sold out 4,000 tickets. The next concert on their Great China Tour was held in Guangzhou on December 19, and sold more than 5,000 tickets – making it the second consecutive sold-out concert on the tour.

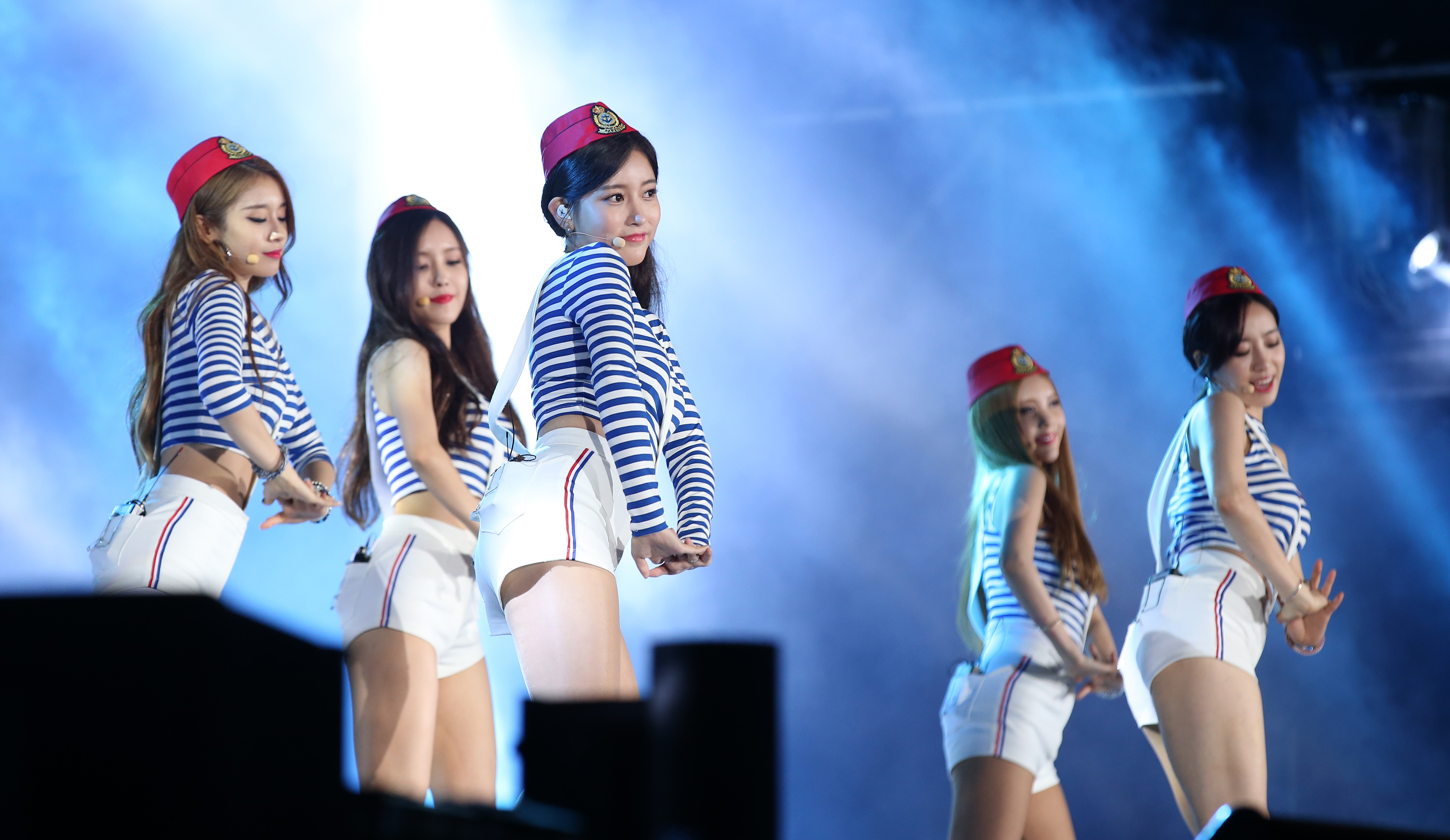
T-ara in 2015 at the Summer K-Pop Festival.

On July 17, 2015, MBK Entertainment confirmed that the group will join the summer comeback lineup in the first week of August. On August 3, 2015, T-ara's seventh extended plays, So Good with title track "So Crazy" was released. It was composed by Brave Brothers and surpassed 1 million views in 2 days. On August 13, T-ara held a press conference for their web-drama Sweet Temptation which features a total of 10 episodes for 6 separate stories. The drama was released in October 2015. On October 15, the Insider Monkey published a list of 16 best-selling girl groups of all-time where T-ara was placed 10th with a total of 36.18 million sales recorded. The group then appeared on season 3 of Chinese game show The Brain, making them the second Korean act to appear on this show, following Kim Soo-hyun, who visited the show during the first season.

On June 4, T-ara participated at the 2016 Dream Concert. The group's performance was a remix of "Bo Peep Bo Peep", "Roly Poly" and "So Crazy", which was well received by the public. On August 6, the group traveled to China to perform at The Asian Music Festival in Shanghai, an event jointly organized by the Shanghai Municipal Publicity Department and the Ministry of Culture, at which the group performed five songs.

In 2016, East Asia Daily newspaper has published several items on the Korean idol stars who have had influence in the last 20 years based on a poll of 2,000 people in Korea. In the category of the Top 14 Favorite Songs, T-ara ranked 14th with the song "Roly-Poly". On September 9, T-ara performed three songs for the IASGO in Seoul. On September 11, T-ara flew to Japan for their Tokyo Fan-meeting. The "Premium Live Concert" was held the Tokyo Dome City Hall where T-ara performed seven songs and interacted with their fans. T-ara performed twice during the day as the event was divided into two parts, one in the afternoon and the other in the evening. T-ara performed their song "You Gave Me Guidance" for the first time live. On September 17, T-ara held their last Concert for their Great China Tour at the Mercedes-Benz Arena in Shanghai with around 12,000 people attending, the highest figure for any South Korean group to date.

T-ara participated in the Busan One Asia Festival on the opening performance on October 1 and later on October 4. Following their appearance, T-ara flew to Jeju to perform at the Jeju Olleh Duty Free Shop Concert on the 9th and performed five songs. In October 2016, MBK Entertainment announced that T-ara would be releasing a mini-album produced by Duble Sidekick in November. T-ara's eighth extended play, Remember, with lead single "TIAMO" was released on November 9. The release was followed by three fan-signing events.

=== 2017–2019: End of the bullying controversy, What's My Name? and hiatus ===
In February 2017, Hwayoung and her twin sister Hyoyoung appeared on Live Talk Show Taxi and revisited the controversy. While Hwayoung initially denied bullying, she now claimed she was "hated" and "bullied" by the other members. Shortly after, a former staff member alleged the twins had actually "bullied" the other members and released texts showing Hyoyoung threatening former member Areum with physical harm for not supporting Hwayoung.

Following this, more staff members revealed evidence of Hwayoung being disrespectful to members and stylists, and exaggerating her injury for sympathy. Although Hwayoung initially denied the claims and criticized the staffers, she later admitted the texts were real and subsequently deleted her Instagram account.

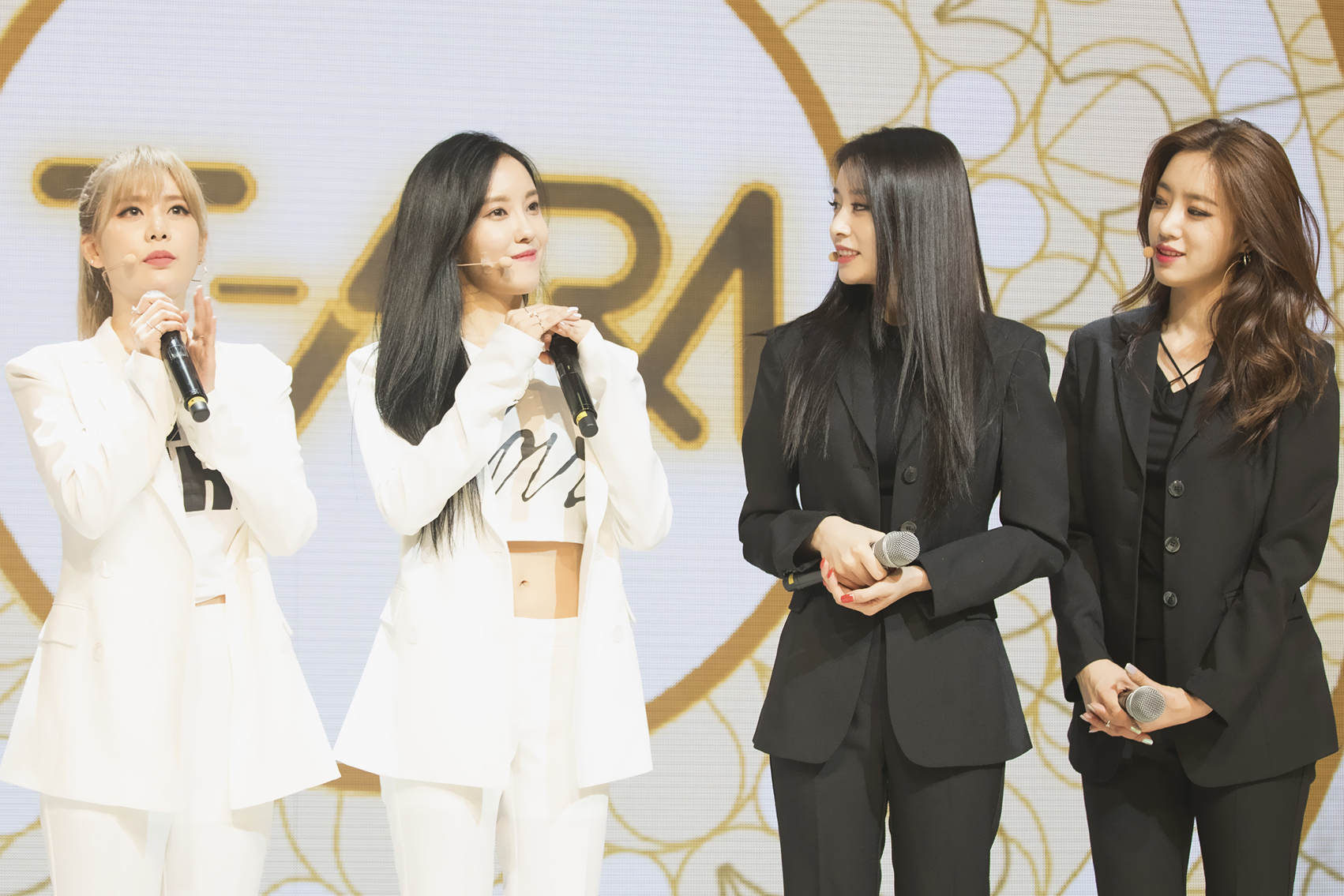
T-ara in 2017 during their What's My Name? showcase.

On March 6, 2017, MBK Entertainment announced that T-ara would be releasing their final album with the company in May, with Soyeon and Boram terminating their contracts after its release. Qri, Eunjung, Hyomin, and Jiyeon were to stay with the label until December 31, 2017. On May 7, MBK Entertainment revealed the group's plans had changed, and that the final album had been rescheduled to release in June 2017, with members Boram and Soyeon not being able to partake due to the expiry of their contracts. On May 8, it was announced that T-ara's last performance as six-members will be in Taiwan on May 13.

The remaining four members continued as a group with releasing their ninth extended play and last promotional album What's My Name? on June 14, 2017. After a five-year period without receiving any awards on music shows, T-ara won first place on The Show on June 20. On November 4, the group held their first concert in Ho Chi Minh city, Vietnam, which reportedly attracted 10,000 attendees. A portion of the ticket sales would be donated to charity in Vietnam in honor of the 25th anniversary of diplomatic relations between Vietnam and South Korea.

On January 3, 2018, Hyomin took to her Instagram account to announce that she, Jiyeon, Eunjung, and Qri had decided to not renew their contracts with MBK, thus leaving the company. The company later confirmed that the group had left the company but did not state that the group had disbanded. MBK Entertainment later confirmed that they had registered a trademark for T-ara on December 28. The members officially filed documentation outlining grounds for rejection of MBK Entertainment's trademark on January 19. On August 8, MBK Entertainment trademarks for T-ara had been denied by the Trademark Act.

=== 2020–present: Reunion, comeback with Re:T-ara ===
On October 2, 2020, T-ara held a single reunion performance in the televised Chuseok of the SBS online variety program MMTG, performing "Roly-Poly" and "Sexy Love". In July 2021, T-ara reunited again with an appearance on JTBC's Knowing Bros. On July 29, it was announced through the group's 12th anniversary V Live livestream that they would be making their first comeback in four years before the winter of 2021. Released in collaboration with Dingo Music, the group made their long-awaited comeback with the single album Re:T-ara on November 15, 2021. The single consists of two tracks: "ALL KILL" and "TIKI TAKA". On November 21, the group held the fan meeting "T-ARA 2021 FAN PARTY" and performed as four for the first time since 2017, including hits like "I Go Crazy Because Of You" and "Bo Peep Bo Peep", as well as performing their two newest songs "TIKI TAKA" and "ALL KILL". On April 22, 2022, T-ara performed and guest-starred as a group again on JTBC's Famous Singers 2.

On June 6, 2024, in an interview with Chinese cultural technology company "Yoocard", it was revealed that T-ara will be reuniting for activities in Shanghai from July 20 to 29. In collaboration with Yoocard, a pop-up shop opened in Shanghai as well, selling numerous types of merch, as well as debuting the group's first official lightstick. It was also revealed that T-ara will be holding multiple fan-meetings in Hong Kong and Macau in September as a celebration of the group's 15th anniversary. T-ara held their first Vietnamese fan meeting in nearly a decade on November 23, 2024. T-ara reunited once again to perform as one of the headliners at the Ye!loo concert in Kuala Lumpur on May 31, 2025 at the Malaysia National Hockey Stadium. On September 12, 2025, they performed at the Re\verse Concert in Mongolia, their first performance in the country in 12 years. On November 10, 2025, T-ara announced a stop in Hong Kong as part of their "TIME TO TOGETHER" on December 20.

On March 2, 2026, T-ara announced 2026 Fan Meeting in Chengdu titled 'Again T-ara 2026'. The fan meeting will held at Huaxi Live - 528 M Space on March 21 and it was their first time performance at China after nearly 10 years. On March 29, 2026, T-ara announced the next city of 'Again T-ara 2026' Fan Meeting in Shanghai and the fan meeting will held at Echo Music Park on April 11. On July 2, T-ara announced fan-con in Malaysia 2026 titled 'Summer Again' and the fan-con will held at Mega Star Arena, Kuala Lumpur, Malaysia on August 9. On August 24, Ganzberg concert official announced T-ara will perform at 'Ganzberg Super Idol concert' in Koh Pich, Phnom Penh, Cambodia on October 3 and it is their first time performing in Cambodia after 12 years. On August 28, T-ara announced they will held fan-con in Taiwan titled 'T-ARA FanCon 2026 in Taiwan' and the fan-con will held at Kaohsiung Music Center, Kaohsiung on October 18 and it is their first time in over 10 years that they holding a dedicated event in Taiwan. On September 5, T-ara announced they will held T-ara 2026 fan-con in Ho Chi Minh City titled 'Moonlight Party' at Saigon Exhibition and Convention Center, Ho Chi Minh City, Vietnam on September 26 and the fan-con is just 7 months after 'the Memories of Youth fancon' in Vietnam.On November 9, SBS Gayo Daejeon official confirmed T-ara will perform at 2026 SBS Gayo Daejeon on December 25 and this is their first time performing at year-end music festival after 11 years.

== Members ==
T-ara's original pre-debut lineup consisted of Hyomin, Eunjung, Jiyeon, Jiae, and Jiwon. Jiae and Jiwon left the group in 2009 before the group's official debut, citing creative differences. However, they are present on the group's pre-debut single "Good Person", released on April 20, 2009 as a part of the original soundtrack for the Korean drama Cinderella Man. An updated version of the song with the debut lineup was released on the group's debut album Absolute First Album. Boram, Qri, and Soyeon were added to the group three weeks before the release of their debut single, "Lies". Hwayoung joined the group on July 26, 2010, thus making T-ara a seven-member group. In 2012, Areum joined T-ara. 2012 also saw the announcement of Dani, who was supposed to become the ninth member of T-ara. However, Dani's debut with the group was cancelled due to T-ara's later bullying controversy. In October 2014, MBK Entertainment decided that Dani would not be part of T-ara N4 and would continue as a trainee instead.

Following the bullying controversy in July 2012, CCM announced that Hwayoung's contract was to be terminated. On July 10, 2013, T-ara returned to its original debut lineup after Areum left to pursue a solo career. T-ara then continued as a six-member group until 2017 when Core Contents Media (now under MBK) announced that Soyeon and Boram were leaving the company.

== Sub-unit ==
=== T-ara N4 ===
On April 12, 2013, Core Contents Media announced the launch of the group's first sub-unit, T-ara N4, standing for "T-ara Brand New 4", and consisting of four members: Jiyeon, Eunjung, Hyomin, and Areum. T-ara had previously tried sub-units with the promotions of their sixth Japanese single "Bunny Style!", in which the B-sides were sung by units of two and three members. However, this was their first time doing formal unit activities. The group's debut song, "Jeon Won Diary" (전원일기; Jeon-won Ilgi), was inspired by the 1980s drama of the same name. Produced by Duble Sidekick, it is a "funky and intense" dance song with elements of hip-hop. The main motif of "Jeon Won Diary" was about breaking away from the same everyday routine. T-ara N4's extended play, Jeon Won Diary, and the music video for the title track were released on April 29, 2013.

=== QBS ===
A Japanese sub-unit called QBS was announced in May 2013, featuring members Qri, Boram and Soyeon. The group focused on the Japanese market. The sub-unit released their debut single "Kaze no You ni" (風のように, Like the Wind) on June 26, 2013. Written and composed by Takanori Fukuta, the song is described as a refreshing pop tune with an evergreen melody that leaves a "lasting impression". To promote the single, QBS held a live show at the Sunshine City Fountain Square in Ikebukuro, Tokyo on June 10, 2013. The group performed "Kaze no Yō ni", along with Boram and Qri's "Shabontama no Yukue" (シャボン玉のゆくえ) and Soyeon's "Love Poem" from their "Bunny Style!" single, in front of 2,000 fans.

== Artistry ==
=== Influences ===
The group has cited several artists that influenced them throughout the years. Particularity, giving th group's continus evolution of concepts, different artists are chosen as inspiration for each comeback. During their early years of promotion the group chose Lee Hyori as their role model. In 2011, T-ara cited TVXQ as their role models for their comeback with Cry Cry, as it incorporated intense choreography and mouvements.

Park Ji-yeon has chosen veteran actress Moon Geun-young, as her acting role model for her cold, cool, and creepy acting, and later chose Kahi as her musical inspiration upon her solo debut in 2014. Main vocalist, Park So-yeon has named Lyn as her role model for her unique singing style. The group's leader selected Uhm Jung-Hwa as her acting idol. In 2014, Hyomin named Lee Hyori as her inspiration praising her confidence on stage and her versatility with each release. Hahm Eun-jung named Ha Ji-won, Jeon Do-yeon, and Lee Mi-sook as her role models.

=== Musicality ===
T-ara's music is marked by hook-heavy dance-pop music that blend upbeat tempos with catchy choruses, which became their trademark during their early years. The group's first album Absolute First Album showcases a diverse musical style that helped define their early identity in the K-pop industry. It combines electronic, synth-pop, and dance music with elements of pop rap, contemporary R&B, and ballads. Tracks like "Bo Peep Bo Peep" and "TTL (Time to Love)" emphasize energetic beats and catchy hooks, aligning with the electronic and synth-pop trends of late 2000s K-pop. Meanwhile, songs such as "Like the First Time" explore softer, ballad-like melodies. The album was initially criticized for "lack of identity" but was later praised for its diversity which helped define their early identity in the K-pop industry. The album along with its tracks has been included in several yearly and all-time lists. In 2017, Jacques Peterson of SBS PopAsia expressed that the album "still stands as one of the best, if not the best, Korean girl group album of the past five years".

Analyzing T-ara's distinctive approach to musicality, Korean newspaper SisaIN highlighted their bold incorporation of a strong trot feel within the girl group landscape. This sonic signature was described as "largely unmatched by their peers", and demonstrated a strategic understanding of a potentially underserved segment. While this choice carved out a specific niche, SisaIN notes that Core Contents Media's CEO Kim Kwang-soo, leveraging his proven success with acts like SG Wannabe, pursued a strategy focused on timeless appeal through familiar retro influences. Ultimately, T-ara's embrace of trot elements was reported as a testament to their willingness to experiment beyond conventional girl group trends.

In 2011, The Korea Herald noted Roly Poly's 1980s disco style as a significant departure from the idol trend of overloading electronic sounds to obscure voices.

=== Themes ===
Recognized for their diversity, T-ara became known for shifting styles and genres which earned them the title "chameleon of the music industry".

=== Style ===
In 2019, Glamour UK included "So Crazy" sailor outfits as one of the greatest fashion moments in K-pop history that helped change the fashion industry forever.

In a consumer survey researching trends in the Singaporean fashion market in 2013, the group was ranked among female K-pop artists whose style most wanted to imitate.

=== Stage performances ===
T-ara's stage performances are known for conceptual outfits and intense choreography. Their performances of their 2011 single Cry Cry was described as powerful and intense by Star News Korea.

== Legacy and impact ==
Since their debut, T-ara has been placed in year-end lists of the top Korean artists and celebrities by numerous publications including Gallup Korea, Forbes Korea, Forbes China, Korean Wave Indonesia, Soribada etc. Particularly, the group is credited as one of the artists that helped spread the Hallyu wave in China. Both Elle Men China and The Paper named the group one of the contributors to K-pop's success and the Hallyu wave culture export abroad in 2020.

In 2021, Aedan Juvat of Pop Wrapped referred to the group as "The second-generation K-pop legends" and credited them for offering "some of the catchiest dance tracks in a decade". In a series of surveys conducted by the Korean Foundation for International Cultural Exchange (KOFICE) and the Ministry of Culture, Sports and Tourism of the most popular K-pop artists globally, T-ara topped the list in Malaysia and was voted fifth in France in 2016, appeared in the top six in Vietnam in 2022 and 2024. In 2024, T-ara was ranked at number 14 in a Gallup Korea survey of the most popular girl groups of the 21st century.

In 2010, In an event organized by former South Korean president Lee Myung-ba, T-ara was invited to perform at the Blue House for "2010 Republic of Korea Children's Day" with over 5,000 children reporters from the Blue House children's newspaper Blue Nuri and the national children's internet newspaper Edunet Children's Newspaper attending the event.

In 2021, Clara Ribeiro from Pop Matters credited T-ara for bringing disco to K-pop with their second mini album John Travolta Wannabe describing it as "a force to be reckoned with" and "Roly Poly" as "one of the catchiest K-pop songs ever made". In 2016, "Roly-Poly" was ranked number 14 among the best female songs chosen by the public in a East Asia Daily survey of 2,000 people. In 2019, Glamour UK included So Crazy sailor outfits as one of the greatest fashion moments in K-pop history that helped change the fashion industry forever.

T-ara appeared in the top five of the most searched female artists on Google Korea from 2010 to 2012. In 2011, T-ara signed onto management agency J-Rock for $4.7 million—reportedly the highest figure of any Korean girl group expanding into the territory at the time. Reportedly, the group made over US$18.5 million in revenue in 2013 alone, ranking second among girl group, behind Girls' Generation and 6th overall among South Korean artists. In 2014, T-ara became the first South Korean girl group to sign with a Chinese management company. The group signed a 5 billion KRW (~US$4.8 million) contract with Longzhen Culture Development. Over 100 media outlets have applied to cover the press conference .The company estimated that the group would bring over 16 billion KRW (~US$15.4 million) in yearly profit. In 2013, T-ara's appearance on Shanghai TV and set an all-time record of 200 million views in ratings.

Since 2009, T-ara has appeared in various fashion magazines including Vogue, Cosmopolitan, Ceci, Marie Claire and Elle. They also appeared on other magazines including The Celebrity, Big Issue, Galaxy Macau (Macau), I Like (Thailand), Kazz (Thailand) and Beijing Youth (China) along with features on Music magazines; including Kwave (South Korea, China, Japan), Music Bank, Billboard and Tower Records (Japan) and gaming magazines, including Board Game (China). T-ara has also appeared as in several tourist-guides and brochures promoting the Korean culture for foreign tourists including on Mapple Magazine (Japan).

Several newer artists have named T-ara as their role models and influence over the years, including Rocket Punch, Coed School, NINE.i, ICE, G-reyish, Gangkiz, Kim Hye-in, Swedish singer AmenA, etc. In July 2021, girl group Rocket Punch's members Yeonhee and Yunkyung cited T-ara as their role-models who inspired them to become idols after watching their performances in their hometown Gwangju. Le Sserafim member Kim Chae-won cited T-ara as one of her favorite K-pop groups on the 215th episode of LeeMujin Service, where she performed a medley of T-ara songs, including "Day by Day", "TTL (Time to Love)", and "Bo Peep Bo Peep". Multiple girl groups have also covered T-ara's songs, such as Itzy, Oh My Girl, Mamamoo, and CLASS:y.

== Endorsements ==
A few days before debut, T-ara received a total of seven CF offers including from beverages, clothing, telecommunication, and teen cosmetics brands. In October 2009, the group signed their first commercial-film contract with Nonghyup. "Apple Song" was recorded especially for the CF and later included as "Apple is A" on the group's debut studio album Absolute First Album. The group also filmed a CF for Nene Chicken in 2009 with comedian and public figure Yoo Jae-suk. T-ara received approximately ₩300 million for each contract—reportedly the highest figure given to a rookie at the time.

On January 15, 2010, it was revealed that the group received about ₩900 million from 3 CFs alone, "the best treatment in the industry" according to official reports. In 2010, the group also modeled for Mentholatum, Tedin Water Parks, and Olympus cameras. T-ara was chosen to model for Tedin Waterpark again in 2011. In February, T-ara was chosen as models for Levi's. The group posed for a Teen Vogue photoshoot promoting the brand's new Polka Dot Denim, which went viral and produced a flood of a flood of inquiries asking about the "T-ara Jeans", as Levi's marketing executive explained.

In 2011, T-ara modeled for sports brand SPRIS, electronics brand iRiver, software company Windysoft, optical store Look Optical, instant noodles brand Shin Ramyun, Crown Mountain and many others. The same year, T-ara was chosen as the new advertisement models for cosmetics brand Tony Moly. The group was expected to model for the brand in not only South Korea, but China, Japan, and other Asian countries as well. T-ara is also the first idol group to sign a contract with online shopping mall Hi-Mart. In 2012, the group modeled for drinks company TTOMA. The group reportedly earned as much as ₩1 billion endorsing Korean fried chicken products in 2012, making it the highest paid girl group in commercial films at the time.

Internationally, T-ara was chosen in 2010 to film a CF for Gusto, one of the largest restaurant chains in Japan with over 1,000 stores nationwide, for about ₩1 billion. About 140 Japanese media officials, including TBS TV, attended the contract signing press conference. In early 2015, T-ara reportedly signed a US$1 million contract with Celucasn, a Chinese popular clothing brand with images and a short promotional video also having already been released. In November, T-ara became spokesperson for Chinese server of a multiplayer game World of Warships and released the Chinese version of "Cry Cry" as the official theme song. The group also became the face of the mobile game Dream of the Three Kingdoms. In 2016, the group became brand ambassadors in Vietnam for Pantech Korea as the company was launching new phone models.

=== Ambassadorships ===
In October 2009, T-ara became the ambassador for the "2009 Apple Day Event" in which they performed their commercial song "Apple Is A" held at Cheonggye Plaza in Seoul. By December 2009, T-ara were the official ambassador for both "Busan Science Museum" and the Japanese anime Evangelion: Breaking for which SS501 were previously models. In June 2011, T-ara was appointed as public relations ambassadors for "National Sharing Movement" by the Korean Ministry of Health and Welfare. The group attended the appointment ceremony on June 14 held at Seoul Plaza in Jung-gu, Seoul.

In August 2011, T-ara were appointed as honorary public relations ambassadors for "2011 Gyeonggi Functional Game Festival". Qri and Boram represented the group by attending the appointment ceremony on August 31, where they received a plaque of appreciation from Gyeonggi Province governor Choi Chan-heung. Over 150 companies participated in exhibitions and export consultations for the event's third edition. In November 2015, T-ara was appointed ambassadors in respect of the establishment of business partnership between Hankyung Media Group and Sina Weibo. The group attended the 2015 Hallyu Center Awards and received the Hallyu Envoy Award.

== Other ventures ==
=== Café "Page One" ===
T-ara launched their own café franchise called Cafe Page One that will expand into a chain of 500 nationwide stores. The name of their café was influenced from the café that Eunjung ran in her drama Coffee House. Cafe Page One was opened on July 1, 2011, where the members were present to greet the customers. An alternate version of the song featuring vocals from original singer SG Wannabe, Ock Joo Hyun and T-ara's So-yeon was released along with a music video of T-ara on the cafe's opening day. A special limited photobook was released celebrating the opening, and it was only given to a small number of fans who attended the opening.

=== T-ara Dotcom ===
In 2010, T-ara launched their own online shopping mall named "T-ara Dotcom" (T-ara.com). To test their entrepreneurial skills, the group held a bazaar in Gangnam, Seoul, where they sold personal items, including stage costumes. The event attracted Over 600 people in a few minutes. The group managed to raise US$2,300. The project was a huge success exceeding ₩600 million Won (~US$590,000) in monthly revenue. It recorded an average 500,000 daily visitors and more than ₩20 million in daily sales. As of June 2010, T-ara Dotcom became the third most successful shopping mall run by a celebrity in a short period. T-ara acted as models for the mall since its opening. The store was also given its own TV show aired in February 2010. In June 2010, Core Contents Media revealed that all proceeds from all of T-ara's World Cup-related products will be donated in support of catering establishments in undeveloped areas of Africa.

=== Mobile apps ===
Since their debut, T-ara has release several mobile apps from games to info-apps. In April 2012, T-ara released "T-ara Shake", a mobile game featuring T-ara's songs. It was a commercial success topping App store's top grossing apps chart for days. In September 2012, T-ara released "T-ara 3D" to promote their comeback with "Sexy Love". According to Core Contents Media "T-ara 3D" was created after a two-month production period in collaboration with app developer Sunshinez. It featured member profiles, 3D images, photos, videos, news & notices, and schedules. The app was on sale on Google's Google Play Android Market and was later released on Apple's App Store. "Touch Touch T-ara" content app was introduced in early 2013 by CCM. The Japanese version of the app was released in February 2013 while the Korean version launched a month later. In 2014, T-ara released their first info-app "T-ara Holic". T-ara's upcoming schedule, activities, music and products were available on the app. In June 2014, T-ara's Hyo-min's self-designed t-shirts were made available exclusively on "T-ara Holic". All products were sold-out within 24 hours.

== Philanthropy ==
On December 22, 2009, T-ara announced that they donated 100 boxes of ramen purchased with their CF appearance fee and 50 packs of toilet paper recently received as a gift from a toilet paper company to JTS, a private international organization for hunger disease literacy. In January 2010, T-ara donated ₩10 million (~$10,000) to Haiti victims after the earthquake disaster. T-ara used all their variety program fees for the donation. In addition, T-ara held a fundraising event in the Jamsil Arena, in Seoul, along with other artists like SG Wannabe. The said event was in hopes of gathering a larger amount of money from stars. Producers from several other companies also attended the event. In June, 2010, Core Contents Media revealed that all proceeds from all of T-ara's World Cup-related products sold on their online shopping mall "T-ara Dotcom" will be donated in support of catering establishments in undeveloped areas of Africa.

On March 11, 2012, T-ara announced through their company's representative that they donated all their profits from their latest Japanese single "Roly Poly" to the victims of the Fukushima nuclear power plant accident. In May of the same year, Soyeon represented T-ara and attended the public interest agreement ceremony to sign an agreement with TTOMA, a drinks brand for which T-ara was a model for. Subsequently, a portion of proceeds from T-ara's personalized drinks with the brand will be donated to the Fruit of Love Foundation. In October of the same year, T-ara donated part of their performance fee to a local Korean school in Malaysia. In July, T-ara donated 0.73 tons of rice received ahead of their first fan meeting in Korea to underprivileged children and other neighbors in need.

In February 2013, T-ara donated 100 sacks of rice to an orphanage in Bucheon ahead of the Lunar New Year holiday. On December 14, the group held a charity event in Eunjung's mother's cafe, Cafenne. T-ara's old clothing, stage costumes and donations from Davichi, Ha Seokjin, Hwang Jungeum and Son Hojun were to be auctioned off. T-ara raised a total of ₩12.5 million (~US$12,000) from the sales and donated about ₩2.5 million (~$2,400) directly on the same day. On the 27th, T-ara donated the remaining ₩10 million (~$10,000) to the Sharing Campaign "Hope Windmill" organized by the Red Cross. T-ara said, "We are able to end the year with a warm heart thanks to the many people who took part in the charity event and we give thanks to those who helped T-ara take the steps necessary for it." In September 2014, T-ara members donated 1,500 kg of rice "Dongducheon Angel" Movement. Hyomin, Qri and Boram personally delivered the donation to "Dongducheon Angel" Headquarters and held an additional fan-sign event to celebrate the Chuseok holiday.

In 2017, a portion of the ticket sales of T-ara's first concert in Vietnam was donated to charity in the country.

== Controversies ==
=== Bullying scandal ===
On July 25–26, T-ara held a concert in Japan where Hwayoung performed only one song due to an alleged leg injury. Afterward, Hyomin tweeted, "There are differences in levels of determination. Let us have more determination," which the other members supported. Hwayoung responded, "Sometimes, even determination alone is not enough... God, you know everything right?". Her sister Hyoyoung added, "My better half is suffering. My heart hurts.". These tweets led to speculation of conflict within the group, which caused a major controversy and backlash against the members.

On July 30, Core Contents Media announced Hwayoung's departure after 1 year and 8 months, citing staff complaints and denying the bullying rumors. Despite both sides stating there was no bullying, public opinion overwhelmingly supported Hwayoung, leading to T-ara temporarily suspending activities.

In February 2017, Hwayoung and her twin sister Hyoyoung appeared on Live Talk Show Taxi and revisited the controversy. While Hwayoung initially denied bullying, she now claimed she was "hated" and "bullied" by the other members. Shortly after, a former staff member alleged the twins had actually "bullied" the other members and released texts showing Hyoyoung threatening Areum with physical harm for not supporting Hwayoung.

Following this, more staff members revealed evidence of Hwayoung being disrespectful to members and stylists, and exaggerating her injury for sympathy. Although Hwayoung initially denied the claims and criticized the staffers, she later admitted the texts were real and subsequently deleted her Instagram account.

In 2024, former agency chief Kim Kwang-soo reignited the controversy and remarked: "T-ara members did nothing wrong." In response, Hwayoung countered that she was indeed subjected to physical and verbal abuse from some group members, had evidence to support her claims, but kept silent so she and her twin sister could be released from the agency contracts. Hwayoung never released any proof for her claims.

=== Legal ===
In August 2010, Voice of the People newspaper reported that the operator of T-ara's fan cafe embezzled money after collecting it from members. The embezzled amount is reported to have ranged from several million to 10 million won.

On April 13, 2012, T-ara was supposed to hold a concert in the United States with Davichi and Yangpa, titled "Power & Beauty in San Francisco", with around 8,000 tickets already sold. However, the concert was postponed and later cancelled due to visas not being prepared four days before the event. The event organizer, Namu Entertainment later sued Core Contents Media, blaming the agency for not taking precautions and not preparing visas in time.

In 2013, the Seoul District prosecutor's office charged a 39 year old male for fraudulently taking advantage of T-ara's image on Smart Phone applications and obtain ₩110 million.

In 2014, MBK Entertainment announced that they had cancelled T-ara's third Japan tour after being scammed by the organizer who had embezzled around 200 million KRW (~$174,000 USD). The scammer was caught 2 years later in 2015.

== Discography ==
=== Korean albums ===
- Absolute First Album (2009)

=== Japanese albums ===
- Jewelry Box (2012)
- Treasure Box (2013)
- Gossip Girls (2014)

== Published works ==
- Sparkle (2012) Tokyo: Gentosha, 2012. ISBN 978-4344021594. Shot by Shin Yamagishi.
- T-ara Private Book (2013) Tokyo: Kodansha, 2013. ISBN 978-4062182201.

== See also ==
- T-ara videography
- List of songs recorded by T-ara
- List of best-selling girl groups
