= QBS (group) =

2013 South Korean girl group

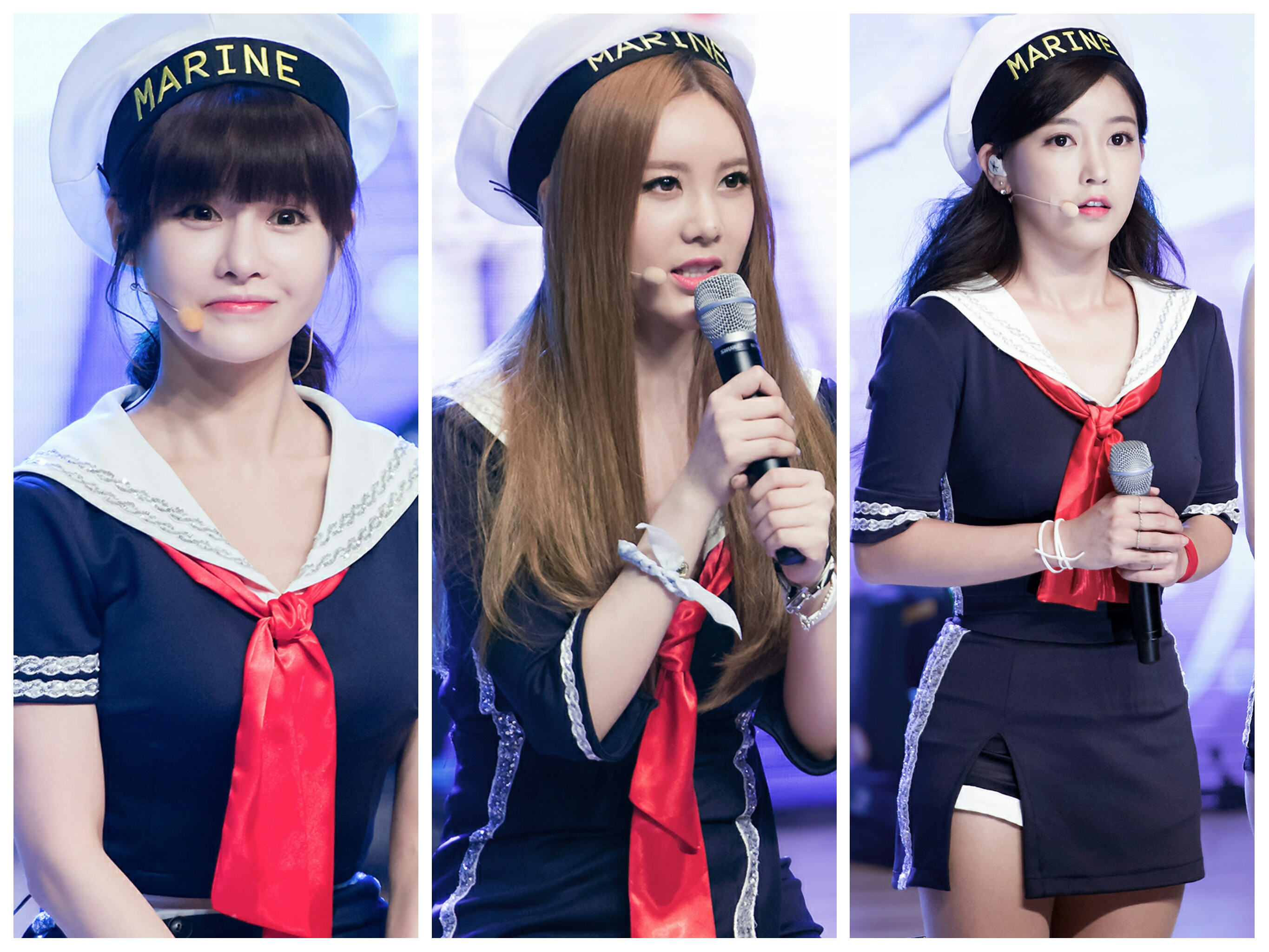
- From left to right: Boram, Qri, Soyeon

Background information
- Genre: J-pop
- Years active: 2013
- Labels: EMI Japan; MBK
- Spinoff of: T-ara
- Past members: Boram; Qri; Soyeon

QBS was the second official sub-group of South Korean girl group T-ara based in Japan, with composed of three members: Boram, Qri and Soyeon. The trio only released one single, "Kaze no Yō ni" (風のように, "Like the Wind") in June 2013.

== History ==
In April 2013, T-ara N4's member through their press conference announced that the remaining members of T-ara: Qri, Boram and Soyeon would prepared a Japanese sub-unit. The sub-group focuses on the Japanese market, and released their debut single "Kaze no Yō ni" (風のように; "Like the Wind") on June 26, 2013. This would be the only song released by the trio.

In May 2017, Boram and Soyeon's exclusive contract with MBK Entertainment expired, leading to their departure from T-ara, quietly disbanding QBS as well.

== Discography ==
=== Singles ===
Title	Year	Peak positions (JP)		
Title	Year	Oricon Chart	Billboard Hot 100	Billboard Singles
"Kaze no Yō ni"	2013	13	12	9
