= Sweet Temptation (web series) =

- Sweet Temptation promotional poster
- 달콤한 유혹
- Genre: Romance, Drama, Fantasy
- Created by: Kim Kwang Soo
- Screenplay by: Yoon So-young, Yunjin
- Directed by: Kibaek Lee
- Opening theme: 1, 2, 3 (T-ara)
- Ending theme: 1, 2, 3 (T-ara)
- Country of origin: South Korea
- Original language: Korean
- No. of seasons: 1
- No. of episodes: 10

Production
- Executive producer: Sehyun Hong
- Producers: Seongtae Kim, Kim Kwang-soo
- Production locations: South Korea, Hong Kong
- Running time: 20 min
- Budget: US$1,2 Million

Original release
- Network: Naver TV
- Release: 5 October – 20 November 2015

Sweet Temptation Korean: 달콤한 유혹 is a 2015 omnibus web series starring all six T-ara members (Hahm Eun-Jung, Park Ji-yeon, Park Hyo-min, Jeon Bo-ram, Park So-yeon and Lee Qri) Jung Chaeyeon and Cho Seung-hee. The show was a joint venture between South Korea and China. It was one of the first original projects produced by Naver TV Cast.

The drama accumulated over 800,000 views in less than a month on Naver TV, making it one of the streaming service's most watched original shows.

== Synopsis ==
Sweet Temptation is a fantasy romance drama that unfolds through a mobile phone application that grants the wishes of six people.

== Cast ==
=== Main ===
- Park So-yeon as So-hee
- Lee Qri as Qri
- Hahm Eun-jung as Eun-jin
- Park Ji-yeon as Ji-ho
- Jeon Boram as Bo-ram
- Hyomin as Hyo-jin
- Lee Joong-moon as Hyun-joon
- Jang Soo-won as Kim Su-won
- Kim Jae-wook as Seok-min
- Seo Joon-young as Sang-in
- Kim Si-hoo as Chae-soo
- Hyun Woo as Han-woo

=== Supporting ===
- Cho Seung-hee as Witch
- Jung Chae-yeon as Ah-mi
- Kim Min-yung as Dong-woo
- Lee So-yul as So-jin

=== Guests ===
- Keon Hee (Ep.1)
- Yang Hak-jin as Eun-jin's boyfriend (Ep.5)
- Kim Jong-min as Manager

== Episodes ==
Episode	Air date	Title	Main cast
1	October 5, 2015	"Baby Good Girl"	Park So Yeon and Lee Joong Moon
2	October 12, 2015	"Black Holiday"	Lee Qri and Jang Su Won
3	November 4, 2015	"Only for You"	Ham Eun Jung and Kim Jae Wook
4	November 6, 2015	"Only for You"	Ham Eun Jung and Kim Jae Wook
5	November 9, 2015	"Reborn"	Park Ji Yeon and Seo Jun Young
6	November 9, 2015	"Reborn"	Park Ji Yeon and Seo Jun Young
7	November 13, 2015	"The Recipe of Love"	Jeon Bo Ram and Kim Si Woo
8	November 13, 2015	"The Recipe of Love"	Jeon Bo Ram and Kim Si Woo
9	November 18, 2015	"When You Are in Love, it Rains"	Park Hyo Min and Hyun Woo
10	November 20, 2015	"When You Are in Love, it Rains"	Park Hyo Min and Hyun Woo

== Background & production ==
Sweet Temptation is a joint venture between South Korea and China. It was co-produced by Naver TV, MBK Entertainment and SBS The show and was scheduled to air in both countries. 6 posters were released to promote the show, one for each T-ara member and her co-star. The drama had a budget of ₩1,3 Billion (~US$1,200,000 (equivalent to $1,591,857 in 2024)).

In August 2015, when T-ara was preparing for their comeback, Brave Brothers' "So Crazy" and Shinsadong Tiger's "1,2,3" competed for the title song, but "So Crazy" received more votes, while "1,2, 3" was used as the opening and closing theme of the drama. However, the song was never officially released on any platform. Due to high complaints, T-ara members spoke about the issue and revealed that they thought the song was already released. In 2021, during their 10th anniversary Live on VLive, Eun-jung revealed that she would think about releasing the song in the future.

On August 13, the drama premiered at Megabox COEX in Samseong-dong, Gangnam District, Seoul, South Korea and was attended by the cast and staff.

== Soundtrack ==
Tracklist
No.	Title	Artist	Length
1.	"The country of separation"	Nayoung Ko
2.	"Fall on the chest"	MC the Max
3.	"Goodbye"	Eun-jung
4.	"This Moment"	Davichi

== Reception ==
=== Commercial performance ===
The drama was a commercial success garnering over 800,000 views in less than a month on Naver TV, making it one of the streaming service's most watched original shows.

"Goodbye" by Eun-jung, the third original soundtrack, was a hit, mainly in China topping the weekly YinYueTai chart with a record-breaking score of 94.23; the highest recorded score for any Korean soundtrack on the platform. The song also peaked at number 2 on Billboard China, a first for a Korean soundtrack. It was also included in the list of "Best songs to listen to in October 2015" by TV Report.

"Fall on the chest", by MC the Max's Lee Soo debuted at 2 on Mnet weekly chart and at 7 on Soribada weekly chart.

=== Critical reception ===
The drama received generally favorable reviews due to its original plot and the main cast's acting, notably Park Jiyeon who was praised for her tearful performance in her 2 episodes "Reborn" and her chemistry with her fellow actor Seo Jun Young.
