= Qri =

South Korean singer and actress (born 1986)

- 이지현
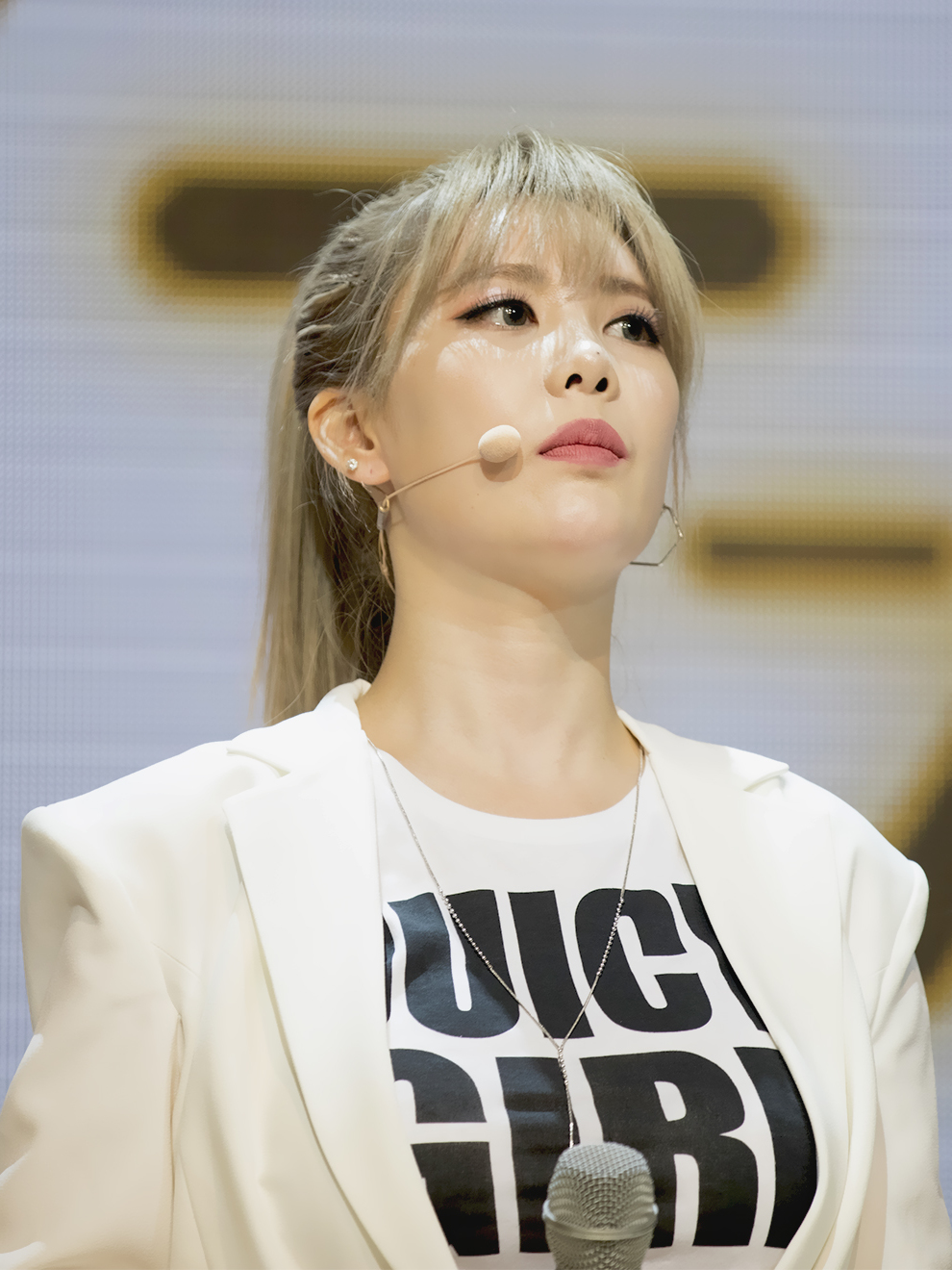
- Qri in June 2017
- Born: Lee Ji-hyun; 12 December 1986 (age 39); Goyang, South Korea
- Education: Myongji University (Bachelor of Film and Musical)
- Occupations: Singer; actress; model
- Musical career
- Genres: K-pop; R&B; electropop
- Instruments: Vocals; bass
- Years active: 2004–present
- Labels: Independent: MBK; EMI Japan; Banana Culture; Sniper Sound
- Member of: T-ara; QBS

Korean name
- Hangul: 이지현
- Hanja: 李智賢
- RR: I Jihyeon
- MR: I Chihyŏn

Signature
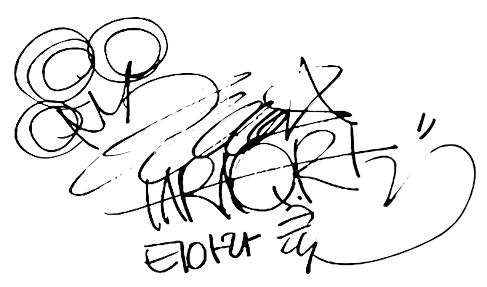

Lee Ji-hyun (Korean: 이지현; born 12 December 1986), known professionally as Qri (큐리), is a South Korean singer, actress, model and fashion designer. She debuted as a member of girl group T-ara in July 2009. Since 2009, Qri has been active in the entertainment industry from acting and variety shows to music to modeling. Her most notable works include her supporting role in hit drama Queen Seondeok, which received near-universal acclaim, winning over 20 awards and solidifying Qri's career in the field.

Qri showed high interest in fashion design in 2018 and ended up designing several commercial products. Qri launched her self-produced jewelry brand "Qriel" in 2021.

== Early life and education ==
Lee Ji-hyun was born on 12 December 1986. She has studied at Juyeob High School, in which she was class president, secretary, and student body president. She then attended Myongji University, enrolling in the Department of Film and Musical, the same class as fellow group member, Boram. She was a model, a famous ulzzang having been a famous figure on the Daum "Five Big Ulzzangs" community.

== Career ==
=== 2007–2009: Career beginnings, modeling and T-ara ===
Prior to her debut, Qri was a model and actress. In 2004, she participated in the "2004 Korea National Ulzzang Contest" with Kang Eun-bi, which helped launch her career in modeling. The contest was held at Konkuk University in a talk-show format, the contestants would show off their various talents, such as playing the piano and singing. In 2006, she appeared on the program Law of Immutable Love posing as a mistress sent by client's girlfriend, which sparked controversy among netizens in 2010. She responded to the article by posting on Twitter: "She's a bored reporter". In 2021, Qri stated that she was working 5 different jobs including as a maid. She also appeared on several television dramas and shows notably her appearance on KBS's Drama Game in 1996 and MBC's Best Theatre. She was also a regular cast for 5 months on Daegyo Children's science program. She modeled for South Korean brands including Casamia Furniture and Gabalnara, as well as international brands such as LG Group and Maybelline New York. In 2007, she appeared on Shin Tae-kwon's "Even If We're Apart" music video.

Qri was signed to Sniper Sound, a hip-hop recording label and was supposed to debut as a bassist in a rock band called Six Colors. The band appeared on several live performances including their first live performance at KT&G Hongdae which received good reviews. However, the debut fell through and Qri was transferred to Core Contents Media. It was later mentioned on tvN's Taxi that she was introduced to the CEO of Core Contents Media by her original company.

Qri was the last of the three new members to be added to the group after two former members Jiae and Jiwon quit in mid-2009 two weeks before debut.

=== 2009–2011: Major acting debut and breakthrough ===
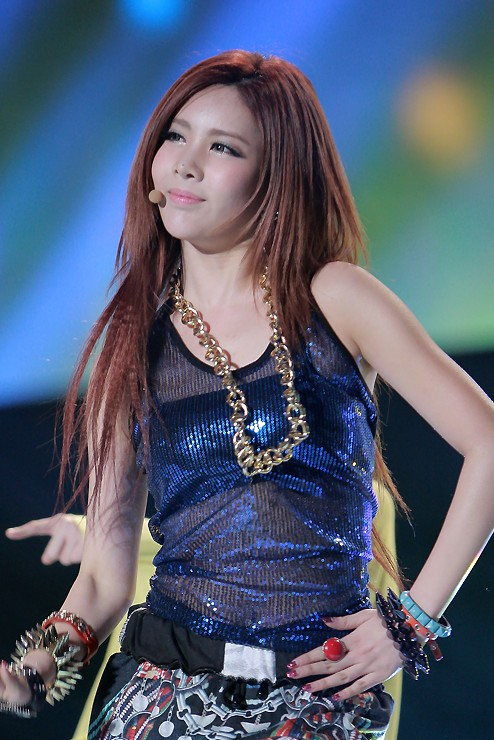
Qri at K Collection, Seoul 2012

In September 2009, Qri made her major acting debut in the drama Queen Seondeok as Kim Yu-shin's wife. The drama went on to become one of 2009's highest rated and most awarded drama in South Korea. On October 21, 2009, she appeared on the cover on Ceci Campus magazine. In 2010, She made a cameo appearance in the drama Master of Study. The same year, Qri was cast in her first main role on KBS's Drama special, titled Southern Trader Kim Chul Soo's Update which received a nomination at 2010 KBS Drama Awards, and then she appeared on SBS's drama Giants as an on-stage singer. In 2011, She was cast for KBS' drama The King of Legend, starting from episode 47.

=== 2013–2023: QBS and solo career ===
Qri, Boram and Soyeon formed a subgroup called QBS in May 2013, focused on the Japanese market. The subgroup released their debut single titled "Like the Wind" on 26 June 2013. The single debuted at number 7 on Oricon's Weekly Singles Chart. The group held a mini-live tour in 3 cities in Japan. The Tokyo show ,reportedly, was attended by more than 2,000 fans.

In July 2013, Qri became the new leader of T-ara under the group's rotating leadership system. On December 3, 2013, she, along with groupmate Eun-jung attended and gave a congratulatory speech at the 2013 Fashion Pictorial Exhibition at Seoul Institute of the Arts. In 2015, she played a main role on the web drama Sweet Temptation. The drama became one of Naver's most watched original shows.

In 2021, Qri released her first solo digital single "Suri Suri". She participated in the writing and production of the song. No music video was filmed for the song. On 29 September, she expressed her gratitude to fans for its success through Instagram. The single topped iTunes Vietnam for three days as well as charting in other countries. It also debuted at first on multiple Chinese weekly charts including Migu China.

=== 2024–present: Return to acting ===
On August 2, 2024, OSEN reported that Qri would be returning to acting 9 years after her last appearance in Sweet Temptation. The actress would make a special appearance in the new MBN mini-series Bad Memory Eraser. On September 29, It was announced that Qri would be part of the main cast of the first Korean-Japanese joint short-form drama series, titled Nebula. A press conference was held on the same day. It revolves around K-Pop stars' growth and struggles. The drama is scheduled to be aired on Japanese OTT platform U-Next, Ameba TV, and other platforms, as well as Japanese terrestrial broadcasting and, later, Korean cable TV. The series was well received and earned the actress critical praise for her performance.

== Other ventures ==
=== Endorsements ===
Prior to her debut as a singer with T-ara, Qri worked with several brands and shopping malls. Qri has worked with many Korean brands including Casamia Furniture and Galbanara, as well as international brands such as LG Group and Maybelline New York. In 2021, Qri became an advertising model for Castellbajac, she filmed multiple videos for the brand which were all released online.

In 2012, The Voice of The People Newspaper, reported that each of T-ara's member's individual advertising fee is around 400 million won, one of the highest in the industry.

=== Fashion design ===
In 2018, Qri announced the launch of her first self-designed product collection with "Celebrity hat brand" Sebs named "Seb.Q" . The collection featured colored hats and hoodies. It was announced that Qri participated in both the designing and production of the products. The project was a huge success with all products selling out and constantly being restocked since 2018. The same year she launched her self-designed clothing brand "Choute.rie" which was sold in South Korea and also exported overseas. In 2021, Qri established her own jewelry brand named "Qriel" for which she modeled herself.

== Public image and impact ==
Known as "Korea's Fashionista", Qri has been praised for her unique fashion sense since debut. She was nominated for the Best Ulzzang at the 2004 Korea National Ulzzang Contest. She has been a regular VIP guest at the Seoul Fashion Week since 2012, modeling for brands like GREEDILOUS,YCH and Holy Number7. In 2022, she was one of the runway models at Gangnam Fashion Festival. She has landed multiple covers and editorials of various fashion magazines in Korea and abroad, including for Ceci Campus, BNT International and Instyle Korea. The model has also successfully released several self-designed items and brands, solidifying her status in the Fashion industry. On December 3, 2013, she was invited to the 2013 Fashion Pictorial Exhibition at Seoul Institute of the Arts. She also gave a congratulatory speech at the event.

Qri has also established herself as a successful actress. In 2009, she starred in Queen Seondeok, which became a national sensation and the most awarded television show of 2009 in South Korea. She landed her first main role on Southern Trader Kim Chul Soo's Updates which received a nomination at 2010 KBS Drama Awards. In 2015, she played a main role on the web series Sweet Temptation. The drama became one of Naver's most watched original shows.

In 2015, she was nominated for the Weibo Star Award at the 2015 Gaon Chart Awards, as one of the longest charting idols on the chart. In 2017, she was placed at 37 on Forbes China's Global Idol Chinese Popularity Ranking. The same year, she was awarded the "Korean Wave Star Award" at the LBMA Star Awards held in Hong Kong.

== Philanthropy ==
Qri is an advocate for pet protection. In 2016, Qri spoke up against animal abuse. After SBS's Animal Farm revealed the dire reality of dogs in breeding farms, she called for revision of the Animal Protection Act.

In September 2014, Qri along with T-ara members donated 1,500Kg of rice for th "Dongducheon Angel" Movement. She personally delivered the donations to the organization's Headquarters and held an additional fan-sign event to celebrate the Chuseok holiday with Boram and Hyomin. In April 2017, Qri, along with Hyomin, co-organized the "Applause 337 Relay" campaign. Proceeds were donated to The Community chest of South Korea, Green Umbrella Children's Foundation and the Children's Rehabilitation Establishment Fund.

== Personal life ==
In November 2012, Qri's maternal grandfather passed away. A representative from her former label CCM announced that she's deeply saddened and shocked by the news. However, she'll be attending her scheduled activities as planned. A private funeral too place at the Bucheon Funeral Home in Gyeonggi Province on November 7, which was attended by T-ara members.

== Discography ==
=== Singles ===
Song	Year	Album	Artist
"Soap Bubbles" (with Boram)	2013	Bunny Style!	T-ara
"Do We Do We"	2013	Bunny Style!	T-ara
"Diamond"	2017	What's My Name?	T-ara
"Suri Suri"	2021	Non-album single	Herself
"Shining Star"	2025	NEBULA Original Soundtrack	Herself
"End of Time"	2025	NEBULA Original Soundtrack	Herself

=== Songwriting credits ===
Year	Album	Song	Lyrics	
Year	Album	Song	Credited	With
2021	Non-album single	"Suri Suri"	Yes	BM, Oh Yu-won

== Filmography ==
=== Film ===
Year	Title	Role	Notes
2010	Death Bell 2: Bloody Camp		Cameo
2011	Ghastly		Cameo

=== Television series ===
Year	Title	Role	Notes	Ref.
1996	KBS Drama Game		Episode: Accidental Journey	
2009	Queen Seondeok	Young Mo	Starting Episode 37	
2010	Master of Study		Cameo	
2010	Southern Trader Kim Chul Soo's Updates	Lee Kyung		
2010	Giant	Singer	Cameo	
2011	The King of Legend	Princess Bu Yeo-jin		
2024	Bad Memory Eraser	Lee Shin	Special appearance	

=== Web series ===
Year	Title	Role	Notes	Ref.
2010	Bubi Bubi	Herself		
2015	Sweet Temptation	Q-ri		
2025	Nebula	Sera	Korean-Japanese series	

=== Variety shows ===
Year	Title	Role	Notes	Ref.
2006	Law of Immutable Love	Guest		
2009	M! Countdown	Special Host	K-Chart announcer	
2009	Mnet Scandal	Cast	With Hyomin	
2012	M! Countdown	Special Host	With Boram	
2012	2012 Idol Star Athletics – Swimming Championships	Contestant	Received Silver medal for 4 X 50 m	
2016	Idol Intern King	Main Cast		
2021	South Korean Foreigners	Contestant	Girl group generations special	

=== Music video appearances ===
Year	Title	Artist	Album
2007	"Even If We're Apart"	Shin Tae-kwon	Song for You

== Live performances ==
=== Award shows ===
Year	Dates	Title	City	Country
2013	January 16, 2013	27th Golden Disk Awards	Kuala Lumpur	Malaysia

=== TV shows and specials ===
Year	Date	Show	Performed Songs	Notes
2010	September 22, 2010	Idol Star Trot Match	"Seoul Trot" (cover)	Chuseok special program

== Accolades ==
=== Awards and nominations ===
Award Ceremony	Year	Category	Recipient	Result	Ref.
Korea National Ulzzang Contest	2004	Best Ulzzang	Qri	Nominated	
Gaon Chart Music Awards	2015	Weibo Star Award	Qri	Nominated	
LBMA Star Awards	2017	Korean Wave Star Award	Qri	Won	

=== Listicles ===
Publisher	Year	List	Placement	Ref.
Forbes China	2017	Global Idol Chinese Popularity Ranking	37th	
