= Park So-yeon (singer) =

South Korean singer (born 1987)

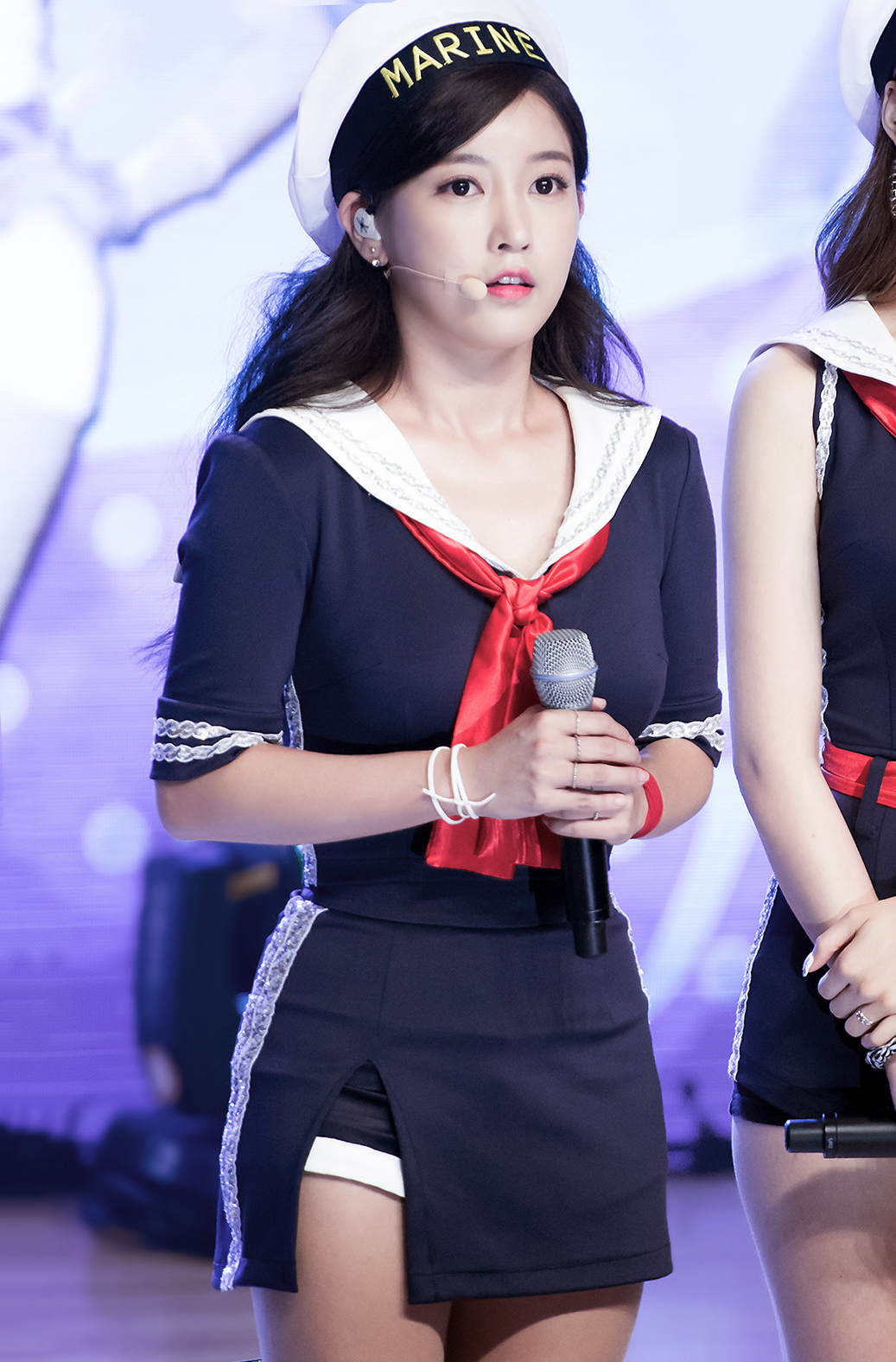
- Park in "So Good" showcase in August 2015
- Born: Park In-jung; October 5, 1987 (age 39); Andong, South Korea
- Education: Anyang High School of Arts
- Occupations: Singer; actress
- Spouse: Cho Yu-min (m. 2022)
- Musical career
- Genre: K-pop
- Instrument: Vocals
- Years active: 2009–present
- Labels: SM; MBK; Think
- Formerly of: T-ara; QBS

Korean name
- Hangul: 박소연
- Hanja: 朴昭姸
- RR: Bak Soyeon
- MR: Pak Soyŏn

Park So-yeon (Korean: 박소연; born Park In-jung on October 5, 1987), referred to as Soyeon, is a South Korean singer and actress. She debuted as a member of girl group T-ara in July 2009. The group went on to become one of the best-selling girl groups of all time.

== Early life and education ==
Park was born Park In-jung on October 5, 1987, in Andong, North Gyeongsang Province, South Korea. She later legally changed her name to Park So-yeon. On August 30, 2021, she revealed through an Instagram Live broadcast that she is descended from the Miryang Park Clan, whose lineage traces back to the 10th-century prince Pak Ŏnch’im (박언침), a son of King Gyeongmyeong of Silla. Park has studied at the prestigious Anyang High School of Arts in Anyang, Gyeonggi province where she majored in Theater and Film.

In an interview with BNT International, Park stated that she developed the desire to become a singer at the age of five. Influenced by veteran performers Park Nam-jung, Yan Soo-kyung, and Uhm Jung-hwa, she aspired to become an all-around entertainer and perform on stage and television. She frequently attended their live performances when she was young.

== Career ==
=== 2007–2009: Career beginnings ===
In 2005, Park participated in the CMB Chin Chin Singing Competition, where she received the Gold Award. She was subsequently scouted by SM Entertainment during the competition’s broadcast and later became a trainee, preparing to debut as the leader and main vocalist of the girl group Girls' Generation, which debuted in 2007. Although she participated in the recording of the group’s debut single Into the New World, she left the company six months before their debut due to personal circumstances. After debuting with T-ara, she later stated on the tvN's program Live Talk Show Taxi that at that time she felt the opportunity had come too easily and that she had been uncertain and not fully prepared for debut.

=== 2007–2011: Official debut ===
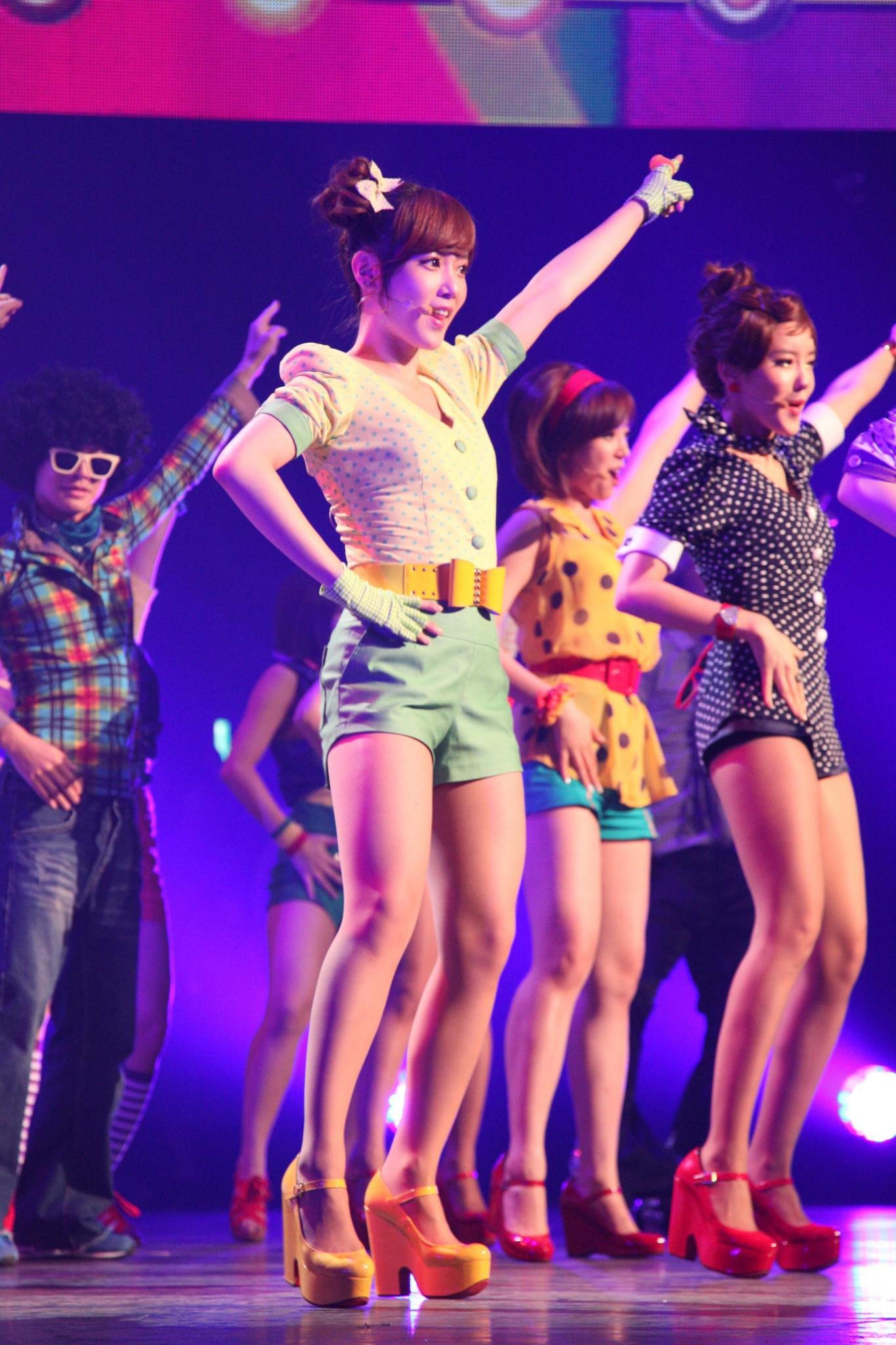
Park with T-ara during the 2011 Cyworld Dream Music Festival

Park was the second new member to be added to T-ara after two former members Jiae and Jiwon left the group in mid-2009. In 2010, she was rushed to the hospital after complaints of not feeling well while filming for her cameo role in Master of Study. She was then diagnosed with H1N1 while T-ara was still promoting the follow-up track Like The First Time off of their first full-length album, Absolute First Album. Park participated in the OSTs for the movie Death Bell 2: Bloody Camp and the SBS drama Coffee House. In 2011, she was a fixed cast member for KBS's variety show 100 Points Out Of 100.

=== 2012–2013: Acting roles and QBS ===
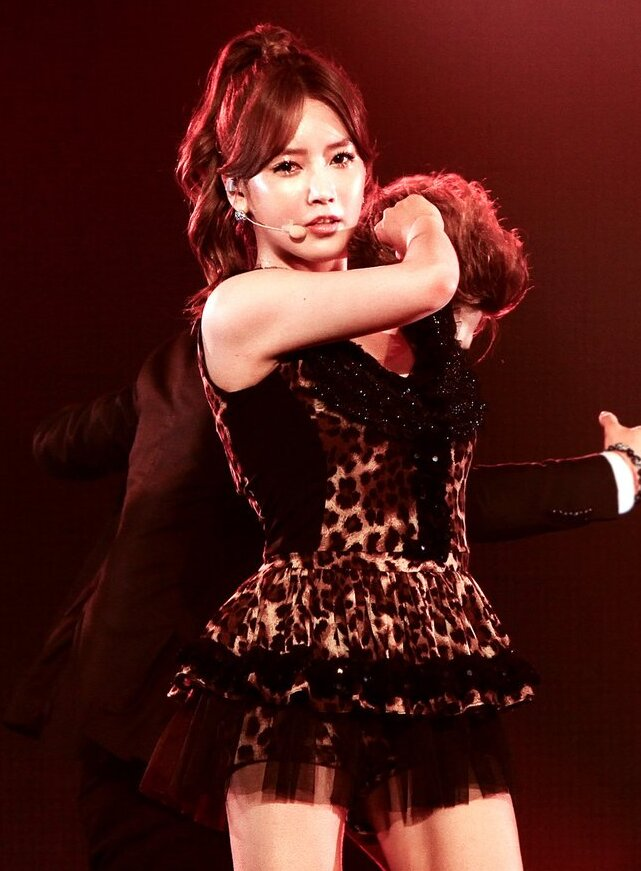
Park in 2013 during the Treasure Box tour

Park participated in the musical adaption of T-ara's hit song Roly-Poly, which opened on January 13, 2012, at the Seongnam Arts Center. She has stated that it is one of her dreams to stand on stage and act on it. She replaced Hyomin as T-ara's new leader starting on December 7, 2011, for their Lovey-Dovey promotions. She is the fourth leader of T-ara after Eunjung, Boram, and Hyomin. In July 2013, she stepped down as leader and Qri became the fifth leader.

Park appeared in the KBS drama Lovers of Haeundae as Lee Gwan-soon. The drama aired on August 13, 2012. Park along with Qri and Boram formed a sub-group called QBS in May 2013. The sub-group focused on the Japanese market. They released their debut single titled "Kaze no You ni" (風のように, Like the Wind) on June 26, 2013.

=== 2017–present: Departure from T-ara and solo debut ===
On March 6, 2017 MBK announced that T-ara would be releasing their last album as a six-member group in May, after Boram and Park's contracts ended, and the other members would remain until December 31, 2017. On May 7, MBK Entertainment revealed the group's plans had changed and that the new album's release had been rescheduled to June 2017, with Boram and Park not participating due to the expiry of their contracts. On May 8, it was announced that T-ara's last performance as a six-member group would be in Taiwan concert on May 13.

On July 11, 2020, it was announced that Park had signed with Think Entertainment. On February 5, 2021, Park released her first ever single as a solo artist in 12 years entitled "They Are All The Same" under Think Entertainment. Before the release of the song, she received support from the members of T-ara. On March 24, 2021, Park released her second single entitled "Interview".

== Artistry ==
On December 7, 2011, Core Contents Media announced that Park would become the new leader of T-ara under the group’s rotational leadership system, overseeing the promotions for Black Eyes and its reissue Funky Town. The appointed leader played a central role in shaping the group’s creative direction, including developing concepts, collaborating with composers, determining styling, and coordinating group activities. In an interview with Money Today, Soyeon stated that the group worked closely with the production team to brainstorm the album’s concept, style, and choreography.

== Endorsements ==
In February 2021, Park became the exclusive model for the Korean tea brand "HOBEATEE". In March 2021, the brand announced a 100% sold-out. It was also mentioned that Park helped the brand's image by drawing attention from both domestic users and her overseas Chinese fans.

In 2012, The Voice of the People Newspaper, reported that each of T-ara's member's individual advertising fee is around 400 million won, one of the highest in the industry.

== Personal life ==
On August 14, 2012, Park was involved in a serious car accident while traveling to Busan to film Lovers of Haeundae. According to Kyunghyang Newspaper, the vehicle, driven by her manager, skidded on rain-slick roads, struck a traffic island, and overturned. The car was severely damaged, and despite wearing seatbelts, two occupants, including Soyeon, were ejected from the vehicle. She sustained neck and back injuries. Filming was temporarily suspended.

In 2020, Park spoke about the physical and psychological impact of the accident. She recalled encountering articles and malicious comments during her hospital stay that expressed wishes that she had died in the crash. She also revealed that she suffered from anxiety disorder and depression during that period. However, she did not seek therapy for years due to fear of the public’s reaction. She added that she avoided taking medication at the time because she was concerned about relying on it to overcome the situation.

On January 18, 2022, Park's agency confirmed that she will marry soccer player Cho Yu-min in November 2022. They have been in a relationship for 3 years. Later, it was announced the wedding ceremony in November has been postponed until next year, due to Cho joining the national team and planning to focus for the 2022 FIFA Qatar World Cup. But the couple had already registered their marriage and were a legal couple.

On September 22, Park revealed through her Instagram that she bought her mother a 3-volume apartment in Seoul's green forest area.

Park is currently living in Dubai with her husband as he plays for Sharjah FC.

On November 1st, 2026, Park's 4th wedding anniversary, she announced that she was pregnant with her first child, a boy.

== Philanthropy ==
In May 2012, Park represented T-ara and attended public interest agreement ceremony to sign an agreement with TTOMA, a drinks brand for which T-ara was a model for. Subsequently, a portion of proceeds from T-ara's personalized drinks with the brand will be donated to the Fruit of Love Foundation.

Park is an advocate for animal protection. In 2015, she participated the anti-animal abuse campaign hosted by Blue Angel Volunteer Group. On March 29, 2015, she held a fan sign at the 2015 K-Pet Fair. All proceeds went to the organization. In 2017, Park was revealed to have been secretly donating ₩1 million every month for 2 years to Blue Angel Volunteer Group. In November that year, News1 reported that Park is an honorary member of the organization.

== Discography ==
=== Singles ===
==== As lead artist ====
Title	Year	Peak chart positions		Album
Title	Year	KOR	KOR Hot	Album
"I Know" (알아요) (with Lee Bo-ram and Yangpa)	2012	12	10	Together
"Painkiller" (진통제) (with Seong Yoo-jin, Seo Eun-kyo, Taewoon and Choi Sung-min)	2013	11	13	Non-album single
"They Are All The Same" (다 그대로더라)	2021	— (Note: "Just the Same as Before" did not enter the Gaon Digital Chart, but appeared at number 191 on the component Download Chart.)	—	Non-album single
"Interview" (인터뷰)	2021	— (Note: "Interview" did not enter the Gaon Digital Chart, but appeared at number 104 on the component Download Chart.)	—	Non-album single
"—" denotes releases that did not chart or were not released in that region.

==== As featured artist ====
Title	Year	Album
"Tell Him to Go" (with Jung Dakyung)	2022	Non-album single

==== Promotional singles ====
Title	Year	Peak chart position	Album
Title	Year	KOR	Album
"Song For You" (널 위해 부르는 노래) (with Ahn Young-min)	2011	52	Ahn Young-min A-Family
"Don't Forget Me" (나를 잊지 말아요) (Note: A special Christmas single with Hahm Eun-jung, Song Minkyung, Cho Seunghee, and Speed's Jongkook, Sejoon and Seungri)	2015	—	Non-album singles
"Letter" (信件) (CHN)	2020	—	Non-album singles
"—" denotes releases that did not chart or were not released in that region.

=== Soundtrack appearances ===
Title	Year	Peak chart positions		Album
Title	Year	KOR	KOR Hot	Album
"How Does It End" (뭐라고 끝낼까)	2010	45	14	Death Bell 2: Bloody Camp OST
"Page One" (페이지원) (Part. 2) (with Ock Joo-hyun) (Note: The song was never released as a stand-out single like typical soundtracks.)	2010	—	—	Coffee House OST
"Page One" (페이지원) (with Ock Joo-hyun and SG Wannabe)	2011	25	30	Coffee House OST
"Until The End" (끝까지) (with Lee Bo-ram)	2011	—	—	Ghastly OST
"One Love" (하나의 사랑) (cover)	2020	—	—	Homemade Love Story OST
"—" denotes releases that did not chart or were not released in that region.

=== Other appearances ===
Title	Year	Album	Notes
"Sign" (with Areum)	2013	Bunny Style! (Single)	Tracks found on T-ara's first original Japanese single
"Love Poem"	2013	Bunny Style! (Single)	Tracks found on T-ara's first original Japanese single
"Sad Engagement" (슬픈 언약식)	2020	Family	Part of Think Entertainment's special Chuseok holiday album
"Don't worry" (걱정말아요 그대) (with Ahn Seong-hoon)	2020	Kim Ho-jung's Partner	Live cover track from Variety show Kim Ho-jung's Partner

== Songwriting credits ==
All song credits are adapted from the Korea Music Copyright Association's database, unless otherwise noted.

Year	Artist	Song	Album	Lyricist		Ref.
Year	Artist	Song	Album	Credited	With	Ref.
2020	Kim Ho-joong	"Full Bloom"	Our Family (우리家)	Yes	Shin Ji-hoo	
2021	Soyeon	"Interview"	Non-album single	Yes	Jesus	

== Filmography ==
=== Films ===
Year	Title	Role	Country	Notes
2011	Ghastly	Girl in the club	South Korea	Cameo
2019	I Love You, You're Perfect, Now Change zh	Park So-yeon	Hong Kong	Cameo

=== Television series ===
Year	Title	Role	Notes	Ref.
2010	Giant	Bunny Girls' member	Cameo	
2010	Master of Study	Bully Student	Cameo	
2012	Lovers of Haeundae	Lee Gwan-soon	Supporting role	

=== Web series ===
Year	Title	Role	Notes	Ref.
2010	Bubi Bubi	So Yeon	Main Role	
2015	Sweet Temptation	So Hee	Main Role	

=== Variety shows ===
Year	Title	Role	Notes	Ref.
2009	M Countdown	Special host	K-Chart announcer	
2009	Invincible Baseball	Cast member		
2010	M Countdown	Special host		
2010ㅡ11	100 / 100	Fixed guest		
2011	Star Couple Battle 3	Main Cast	Chuseok special program	
2011	M Countdown	Special host	With Eun-jung	
2012	Crown Princess Show	Main cast		
2013	Music Bank	Special host		
2019	Shopping King	Host		
2020	King of Mask Singer	Contestant	as "Diver" (Ep. 267–268)	
2020	Miss Back	Contestant		
2022	We Are Family	Cast Member		

=== Hosting ===
Year	Title	Notes	Ref.
2013	Yongin Military Concert		
2013	APAN Star Awards	With Lee Hwi Jae	
2014	APAN Star Awards	With Kim Sung Joo	
2015	APAN Star Awards	With Lee Hwi-jae, Kim Sung-joo and Lee Hoon	
2020	Kim Ho-joong fanmeeting	two-day fan meeting	

=== Musical ===
Year	Title	Role	Notes	Ref.
2012	Our Youth, Roly Poly Musical	Oh Hyun-joo	Main Role	

== Live performances and events ==
=== Fan meetings ===
Year	Date	Fan meeting	Country	City	Venue	Ref.
2019	November 30, 2019	Soyeon Fanmeeting 2019 in Japan	Japan	Tokyo	Yokohama YTJ Hall	

=== Festivals ===
Year	Date	Event	City	Country	Performed Song(s)	Ref.
2005	June 24, 2005	CMB Chin Song Festival	Seoul	South Korea	Unknown	
2011	December 31, 2011	MBC Music Festival	Seoul	South Korea	"Now" (Note: Fin.K.L cover)	
2014	September 28, 2014	5th Hallyu Dream Festival	Gyeongju	South Korea	Silla's Moonlight" (Note: Hyun In cover)	

=== TV shows and specials ===
Year	Date	Show	Performed Song(s)	Country	Ref.
2009	August 14, 2009	Music Bank	"Two of Us" (Note: Cover)	South Korea	
2009	August 27, 2009	M Countdown	"How Come" (Note: Brown Eyed Girls cover)	South Korea	
2010	May 27, 2010	M! Countdown	"Coffee Over Milk"	South Korea	
2010	June 6, 2010	Inkigayo	"Coffee Over Milk"	South Korea	
2010	June 25, 2010	Inkigayo	"What Should We Finish"	South Korea	
2010	June 26, 2010	Show! Music Core	"What Should We Finish"	South Korea	
2010	July 2, 2010	Music Bank	"What Should We Finish"	South Korea	
2010	July 18, 2010	Kim Jung-eun's Chocolate	"What Should We Finish"	South Korea	
2010	September 22, 2010	Idol Star Trot Match (Note: Chuseok special program)	"Seoul Trot" (Note: Cover)	South Korea	
2011	August 23, 2011	Morning Place	"I Don't Know Anything But Love" (Note: Sim Soo-bong cover)	South Korea	
2011	September 13, 2011	Star Couple Battle 3 (Note: Chuseok special program)	"Come Back Home" (Note: Seo Taiji and Boys cover); "Candy" (Note: H.O.T. cover); "Eternal Love" (Note: Fin.K.L cover)	South Korea	
2012	February 29, 2012	Made In BS	"Snow Flower" (Note: Mika Nakashima cover)	Japan	
2014	October 31, 2014	Hidden Singer 3	"You Are You" (Note: Cover)	South Korea	
2014	September 24, 2014	Weekly Idol	"Men Are Ships, Women Are Harbors" (Note: Sim Soo-bong cover)	South Korea	
2020	August 18, 2020	King of Masked Singer	"Wait" (Note: Younha cover)	South Korea	
2020	August 24, 2020	King of Masked Singer	"Cold Noodles" (Note: Jessica Jung cover)	South Korea	
2020	October 6, 2020	Video Star	"I Loved You" (Note: Cover)	South Korea	
2020	October 22, 2020	Miss Back	"One Love" (Note: Park Sang-min cover)	South Korea	
2021	March 26, 2021	You Heeyeol's Sketchbook	"One Love" (Note: Park Sang-min cover); "Interview"	South Korea	

=== Radio specials ===
Year	Date	Show	Performed songs
2011	January 4, 2011	KBS Radio	"Bye Bye Bye" (Note: Hwayobi cover)

== Accolades ==
=== Awards and nominations ===
Award ceremony	Year	Category	Nominee / work	Result	Ref.
Baidu Entertainment Awards	2015	Popular Artist Award	Herself	Nominated	
CMB Chin Song Festival	2005	First Place Winner	Herself	Won	
China Powerstar Awards	2017	Most Influential Female Foreign Artist	Herself	Nominated	
China Powerstar Awards	2018	Most Influential Female Foreign Artist	Herself	Nominated	
KBS Entertainment Awards	2009	Best Teamwork	Invincible Baseball	Won	

=== Listicles ===
Publisher	Year	List	Placement	Ref.
Forbes China	2017	Global Idol Chinese Popularity Ranking	45th	
