= Good Daddy =

- Also known as: Being A Good Daddy
- 좋아서
- Genre: Reality, variety
- Presented by: Moon Mason
- Country of origin: South Korea
- No. of episodes: 12

Original release
- Network: SBS
- Release: November 1, 2008 – January 24, 2009

Being A Good Daddy (Korean: 좋아서), also called Good Daddy, The Daddy I Like or Because I Like You (the literal translation from Korean), was a South Korean reality variety show. Originally having been just a Chuseok show, it became a permanent weekly show after favourable reviews of its pilot episode.

== Summary ==
Five male celebrities of different ages and talents are gathered together to take care of a daughter, each sharing the role of parenting as well as dealing with issues such as education (parent-teacher meetings) and outings.

The show was hosted by the then 2-year-old Moon Mason, and although he could not talk yet, he guided them through the show with missions to do with their daughter.

== Cast ==
- Daddies
  - Kim Gun-mo
  - Kim Hyeong-beom
  - Yoo Se-yoon
  - Kim Hee-chul (Super Junior)
  - Lee Hongki (F.T. Island)
- Daughters
  - Lee Hyo-jung (pilot to episode 5)
  - Yoon Jung-eun (episodes 6 to 12)

== Episodes and rating ==
In the ratings below, the highest rating for the show will be in red, and the lowest rating for the show will be in blue.

#	Date broadcast	Summary	AGB Nielsen ratings
0	September 14, 2008	Pilot episode. Lee Hyo-jung	—
1	November 1, 2008		5.3%
2	November 15, 2008		—
3	November 22, 2008		5.0%
4	November 29, 2008		—
5	December 6, 2008		5.7%
6	December 13, 2008	New daughter Yoon Jung-eun	5.9%
7	December 20, 2008		6.4%
8	December 27, 2008		4.7%
9	January 3, 2009		6.7%
10	January 10, 2009	Special guests: Girls' Generation (Tiffany Young, Kwon Yu-ri)	7.2%
11	January 17, 2009	Special guests: Kara (Han Seung-yeon, Goo Hara, Kang Ji-young), Eun Ji-won, Baek Ji-young	8.4%
12	January 24, 2009		—
