= List of Mix Nine contestants =

Mix Nine is a South-Korean survival reality television show.

== Contestants ==
English names are according to the official website.

Color Key

Top 9 of the week
Left the show
Eliminated	Debut Team

=== Female Contestants ===
Company	Name	Ranking												
Company	Name	Showcase		Episode 4		Episode 5	Episode 7		Episode 8	Episode 10	Episode 11	Episode 13	Episode 14	Final
Company	Name	Showcase		Online	Post Showcase	Online	Online	Co-Ed Ranking	Online	Episode 10	Online	Episode 13	Episode 14	Final
2able Company	Park Hae-young (박해영)^{39}	65	B	21	16	21	19	46	26	30				30
A100 Entertainment	Chon Ye-im (전예임)	36	A	82	40	75	83	156						86
A100 Entertainment	Kim Su-a (김수아)^{57}	88	C	37	26	38	38	85	12	13	21	22		22
Astory Entertainment	Goh A-ra (고아라)^{18} ^{42}	67	B	19	20	17	14	38	14	19	19	21		21
Astory Entertainment	Go Jeong-hee (고정희)^{18}	91	C	26	93	29	29	67	42	38				38
Astory Entertainment	Kim Min-ju (김민주)^{18}	22	A	31	13	35	30	68	44	22	27	26		26
Bace Camp Entertainment	Jeong Sa-ra (정사라)	27	A	16	9	23	20	48	33	17	18	12	12	12
Bace Camp Entertainment	Nam Yu-jin (남유진)	69	C	20	48	18	15	39	10	10	6	7	5	5
Blockberry Creative	Jeon Hee-jin (전희진)^{19}	53	B	7	15	5	5	12	3	5	7	6	4	4
Blockberry Creative	Kim Hyun-jin (김현진)^{19}	23	A	6	7	8	7	17	8	8	12	3	15	15
Brave Entertainment	Yu Jin-kyung (유진경)	5	9	24	43	19	16	42	35	42				42
Choon Entertainment	Hong Joo-hyun (홍주현)	86	C	56	97	60	75	148						80
Coridel Entertainment	Hwang Woo-lim (황우림)^{20}	39	B	51	41	53	55	124						60
Coridel Entertainment	Lee Ha-young (이하영)^{20}	87	C	36	25	34	25	61	9	7	5	8	9	9
CS Entertainment	Yeo In-hye (여인혜)	95	C	63	82	71	84	157						89
DK Entertainment	Choi Ji-seon (최지선)	20	A	93	24	96	72	145						77
DoubleV Entertainment	Song Ji-eun (송지은)^{37}	61	B	98	79	98	90	163						95
ELEVEN9 Entertainment	Kim Hee-su (김희수)	6	9	90	54	97	78	151						83
Fave Entertainment	Baek Min-seo (백민서)	55	B	60	39	58	59	130						64
Fave Entertainment	Kim Bo-won (김보원)	49	B	28	33	31	26	64	20	16	11	15	10	10
Fave Entertainment	Lee Soo-jin (이수진)^{58}	1	9	13	1	9	8	22	6	3	4	Left the show		27
Fave Entertainment	Lee Soo-min (이수민)^{39} ^{42}	15	A	2	23	2	2	5	2	2	2	2	2	2
Fave Entertainment	Park Hae-lin (박해린)	12	A	15	6	15	12	35	23	35				35
Fave Entertainment	Park So-eun (박소은)^{58}	19	A	43	44	48	50	114						55
Fave Entertainment	Shin Ji-yoon (신지윤)^{58}	31	A	40	45	41	39	88	31	44				44
Fave Entertainment	Shin Su-hyun (신수현)^{59}	74	C	53	38	54	54	123						59
Happy Face Entertainment	Kim Min-ji (김민지)^{21}	56	B	4	3	7	Left the Show							47
Happy Face Entertainment	Kim Yoo-hyeon (김유현)^{21}	8	9	12	34	13	Left the Show							48
Happy Face Entertainment	Lee Si-yeon (이시연)^{21}	44	B	14	27	16	Left the Show							49
Happy Face Entertainment	Lee Yu-bin (이유빈)^{21}	50	B	23	30	24	Left the Show							50
HUNUS Entertainment	Choi Yun-a (최윤아)^{22}	72	C	32	17	36	35	79	25	23	23	18	17	17
HUNUS Entertainment	Yang Hye-seon (양혜선)^{22}	34	A	38	18	39	32	72	37	43				43
Illusion Entertainment	Mun Eun-jin (문은진)^{23}	45	B	55	85	63	57	126						62
IME KOREA	Ahn Han-byul (안한별)	62	B	70	65	86	79	152						84
IME KOREA	Kim Ju-yeon (김주연)	32	A	79	14	89	63	136						68
IME KOREA	Park Eun-jo (박은조)	83	C	96	89	94	76	149						81
IME KOREA	Park Soo-min (박수민)	9	9	58	11	55	42	93	18	15	9	9	3	3
Individual Trainee	Jung You-jung (정유정)	80	C	59	81	59	70	143						75
Individual Trainee	Kim Yoon-young (김윤영)	59	B	44	70	45	46	97	38	28				28
Individual Trainee	Mizuki Ogawa (오가와 미즈키)^{60}	77	C	48	71	49	47	109						52
JD Entertainment	Chaung Da-sol (정다솔)	96	C	89	83	87	89	162						89
JTG Entertainment	Kim Hyun-jung (김현정)^{24}	68	C	41	19	43	34	78	32	37				37
JTG Entertainment	Seo Yu-ri (서유리)^{24}	25	A	76	22	78	66	139						71
JTG Entertainment	Shin Jee-won (신지원)^{24}	98	C	33	21	25	23	56	28	27	26	24		24
Jungle Entertainment	Baek Hye-jin (백혜진)^{25}	66	B	74	58	68	81	154						86
Jungle Entertainment	Kwak Hee-o (곽히오)^{25}	78	C	45	72	46	48	110						53
JYP Entertainment	Shin Ryu-jin (신류진)^{56}	26	A	1	55	1	1	2	1	1	1	1	1	1
MAJOR9 Entertainment	Im So-hyeon (임소현)	64	B	62	37	61	44	95	30	41				41
MAJOR9 Entertainment	Lee Seung-mi (이승미)	97	C	80	60	84	86	159						91
MAJOR9 Entertainment	Lee Su-hyun (이수현)^{39}	43	B	91	63	92	61	133						66
Maroo Entertainment	Ahn Da-bi (안다비)	54	B	86	28	79	71	144						76
Maroo Entertainment	Choi Moon-hee (최문희)^{26}	17	A	8	8	4	4	11	5	4	8	11	6	6
Maroo Entertainment	Jung Ha-yoon (정하윤)^{26}	2	9	47	4	30	17	44	16	11	14	5	11	11
Maroo Entertainment	Kim Chae-hyun (김채현)^{26}	60	B	57	47	56	62	135						67
Maroo Entertainment	Kim Da-yoon (김다윤)^{26}	21	A	27	61	28	28	66	39	45				45
Mole Entertainment	Heo Young-joo (허영주)^{28} ^{43}	63	B	50	57	50	46	107						51
Mole Entertainment	Kim So-ri (김소리)^{27} ^{43}	16	A	3	12	3	3	9	4	6	10	10	7	7
Mole Entertainment	Lee Ye-eun (이예은)^{43}	79	C	52	52	52	49	112						54
Mole Entertainment	Yukika Teramoto(테라모토 유키카)^{43}	73	C	17	59	14	13	36	17	34				34
Mostable Music	Baek Da-ae (백다애)	10	A	69	76	64	56	125						61
Mostable Music	Choi Soo-jung (최수정)	81	C	92	96	90	91	164						96
Mostable Music	Heo Chan-mi (허찬미)^{29} ^{39} ^{64}	29	A	10	32	11	10	29	13	14	16	20		20
Mostable Music	Kim Min-kyung (김민경)	33	A	46	68	47	31	69	22	20	15	16	16	16
Mystic Entertainment	Hwang Ji-min (황지민)	30	A	34	67	37	40	90	41	26	25	14	14	14
Mystic Entertainment	Kim Su-hyun (김수현)^{39} ^{67}	70	C	22	87	22	18	45	29	25	17	17	18	18
New Planet Entertainment	Rui Watanabe (와타나베 루이)^{30}	84	C	25	90	27	24	57	21	21	24	25		25
ONO Entertainment	Bang Ye-sol (방예솔)	51	B	85	86	83	67	140						72
ONO Entertainment	Lim Jeong-min (임정민)^{39} ^{45}	13	A	30	84	32	33	73	43	46				46
ONO Entertainment	Lee Yong-chae (이용채)^{45}	14	A	88	95	67	45	96	45	33				33
Polaris Entertainment	Choi Ha-young (최하영)	3	9	35	2	26	21	50	29	39				39
Polaris Entertainment	Yoo Ha-jung (유하정)	57	B	97	50	95	69	142						74
ProBeat Entertainment	Han Gyeo-ul (한겨울)^{31}	92	C	71	53	70	82	155						87
RBW	Jang Eun-seong (장은성)^{61}	40	B	73	42	80	73	146						78
RBW	Jo You-ri (조유리)	35	A	66	69	65	80	153						85
RBW	Kim Sung-eun (김성은)	75	C	64	88	63	53	121						58
RBW	Kim Young-seo (김영서)	4	9	39	75	42	43	94	46	40				40
RBW	Lee Ye-sol (이예솔)	52	B	72	46	72	77	150						82
RBW	Seo Ji-heun (서지흔)	71	C	78	80	82	85	158						90
Roots Entertainment	Jeon Yu-jin (전유진)	94	C	67	74	74	88	161						93
Roots Entertainment	Lee Bom (이봄)	46	B	83	64	85	74	147						79
Roots Entertainment	Lee Yeo-reum (이여름)	24	A	84	66	73	65	138						70
SidiusHQ	Lee Hyang-sook (이향숙)^{32}	41	B	9	36	10	9	26	11	31				31
Star Empire Entertainment	Jang Hyo-gyeong (장효경)	47	B	29	56	33	27	65	19	12	3	4	8	8
Star Empire Entertainment	Kang Si-hyun (강시현)^{33} ^{39}	18	A	18	35	20	22	52	36	29				29
Star Empire Entertainment	Kim Yun-ji (김윤지)	11	A	42	5	40	36	81	40	36				36
Star Road Entertainment	Rena Sekioka (세키오카 레나)^{33}	93	C	77	94	76	68	141						73
START Entertainment	Moon Seung-you (문승유)	82	C	61	73	51	52	117						57
START Entertainment	Park Ji-woo (박지우)	37	A	54	49	57	51	116						56
TaJoy Entertainment	Kim Soo-yeon (김수연)	89	B	87	92	88	92	165						97
The Entertainment Pascal	Park Ga-eun (박가은)	42	B	75	77	81	58	129						63
The Music Works	Kim Si-hyeon (김시현)^{39} ^{63}	7	9	49	31	44	41	90	34	18	20	19		19
The Music Works	Lee Ji-eun (이지은)^{65}	48	B	81	78	77	37	83	15	24	22	23		23
Unleash Entertainment	Ng Sze Kai (응 씨 카이)^{34} ^{39}	76	C	11	29	12	11	33	24	32				32
YAMA&HOTCHICKS	Baek Hyeon-joo (백현주)^{35}	28	A	5	10	6	6	13	7	9	13	13	13	13
YAMA&HOTCHICKS	Han Byeol (한별)^{35}	90	C	68	98	69	64	137						69
YAMA&HOTCHICKS	Lim Ji-hye (임지혜)^{35}	38	A	95	62	91	93	166						98
YAMA&HOTCHICKS	Jung Ye-eun (정예은)^{35}	58	B	65	51	66	60	134						65
YAMA&HOTCHICKS	Park Cho-hyeon (박초현)^{35}	85	C	94	91	93	87	160						92

=== Male Contestants ===
Company	Name	Ranking												
Company	Name	Showcase		Episode 4		Episode 5	Episode 7		Episode 8	Episode 10	Episode 11	Episode 13	Episode 14	Final
Company	Name	Showcase		Online	Post Showcase	Online	Online	Co-Ed Ranking	Online	Episode 10	Online	Episode 13	Episode 14	Final
Banana Culture Entertainment	Chae Chang-hyeon (채창현) ^{46}	13	A	34	61	36	37	62	35	34				34
Banana Culture Entertainment	Lee Jae-jun (이재준) ^{1} ^{46} ^{69}	47	B	30	20	49	53	99	28	26	17	16	16	16
Banana Entertainment	Yoon Yong-bin (윤용빈)^{38}	63	C	22	42	26	28	47	42	51				51
Beat Interactive	Kim Byeong-kwan (김병관)^{2}	3	9	6	12	3	3	4	3	2	3	3	4	4
Beat Interactive	Kim Seh-yoon (김세윤)^{2}	54	C	27	68	24	20	30	11	10	10	11	12	12
Beat Interactive	Lee Dong-hun (이동훈)^{2}	8	9	18	49	16	15	23	6	5	4	6	8	8
BYKING Entertainment	Yao Ming-ming (요명명)^{3} ^{47}	51	B	12	15	11	13	20	18	13	8	9	10	10
Choeun Entertainment	Kim Jin-hong (김진홍)^{4}	33	B	39	45	41	39	70	Left the Show					53
Choeun Entertainment	Lee Chang-sun (이창선)^{4} ^{69}	24	A	56	63	56	59	105						59
Chrome Entertainment	Kim Jae-oh (김재오)^{5}	71	C	68	55	67	61	108						61
Chrome Entertainment	Park Seong-hyeon (박성현)^{5}	72	C	51	10	48	44	77	50	45				45
ELEVEN9 Entertainment	Im Young-jun (임영준)^{6}	43	B	49	29	51	45	80	45	40				40
FM Entertainment	Jung Hyeon-woo (정현우)^{44}	20	A	29	62	30	35	59	31	33				33
FM Entertainment	Kim Sang-yeon (김상연)^{44}	64	C	44	68	40	58	104						58
FM Entertainment	Shin Jung-min (신중민)^{44}	69	C	50	44	53	57	103						57
Happy Face Entertainment	Cho Yong-geun (조용근)^{38} ^{48}	60	C	10	24	13	17	25	19	15	22	25		25
Happy Face Entertainment	Kim Hyeon-soo (김현수)^{48}	31	B	19	50	22	23	34	5	8	12	14	14	14
Happy Face Entertainment	Woo Jin-young (우진영)^{38} ^{48}	32	B	1	5	1	1	1	1	1	1	2	1	1
Happy Face Entertainment	Yoon Jae-hee (윤재희)	44	B	20	47	20	24	37	20	30				30
HUNUS Entertainment	Hwang Yoon-seong (황윤성)^{7}	37	B	41	23	42	47	84	48	49				49
HUNUS Entertainment	Kim Hyeon-jong (김현종)^{7}	22	A	43	25	47	48	86	47	27	19	17	17	17
HUNUS Entertainment	Kim Min-hak (김민학)^{7}	6	9	36	28	37	38	63	40	41				41
HUNUS Entertainment	Ma Jae-kyeong (마재경)^{7}	41	B	45	21	46	51	92	43	44				44
IME KOREA	Kim Han-kyeol (김한결)	34	B	58	26	63	69	127						69
IME KOREA	Kim Seong-yeon (김성연) ^{49}	59	C	70	48	64	66	119						66
Jungle Entertainment	Jung Seung-bo (정승보)^{9}	62	C	72	64	70	70	131						71
Jungle Entertainment	Kim Jun-hoe (김준회)^{9}	61	C	62	36	66	52	98	51	48				48
Jungle Entertainment	Manny (만니)^{9}	40	B	65	59	57	64	115						64
KQ Entertainment	Choi Jong-ho (최종호)^{50}	27	A	57	33	61	50	91	46	43				43
KQ Entertainment	Jung Woo-young (정우영)^{50}	57	C	63	52	71	71	132						72
KQ Entertainment	Kim Hong-joong (김홍중)^{50}	7	9	59	13	59	49	87	44	42				42
KQ Entertainment	Song Min-ki (송민기)^{50}	23	A	67	56	72	63	113						63
Liveworks Company	Jin Seong-ho (진성호)^{10} ^{51}	58	C	32	16	34	29	49	21	18	14	15	15	15
Liveworks Company	Lee Ru-bin (이루빈)^{10} ^{51}	28	A	14	1	17	16	24	9	12	9	12	3	3
Liveworks Company	Moon Jae-yoon (문재윤)^{10} ^{70}	30	A	40	17	39	46	82	39	50				50
Luce Entertainment	Moon Young-seo (문영서)	55	C	66	67	65	62	111						62
MAJOR9 Entertainment	Kazuhiro Hiyama (히아마 가즈히로)	25	A	47	57	43	41	74	52	47				47
Maroo Entertainment	Han Jong-yeon (한종연)^{38}	17	A	53	66	54	60	106						60
Maroo Entertainment	Jo Young-ho (조영호)	9	9	46	3	44	42	75	49	52				52
Maroo Entertainment	Son Jun-hyeong (손준형)^{62}	19	A	69	54	68	68	122						68
Million Market	Woo Tae-woon (우태운)^{11}	42	B	13	19	7	7	10	13	11	20	20		20
Mystic Entertainment	Kim Seung-min (김승민)	67	C	61	65	58	55	101						55
NH Media	Jo Han-guk (조한국) ^{68}	65	C	64	43	62	67	120						67
NH Media	Kim Dong-hyeon (김동현) ^{68}	10	A	48	46	50	56	102						56
NH Media	Lee Ha-bit (이하빛) ^{68}	26	A	55	58	52	43	76	27	39				39
RBW	Kim Young-jo (김영조)^{52}	52	C	21	41	23	26	41	29	21	27	27		27
RBW	Lee Chan-dong (이찬동)^{36}	15	A	33	32	33	34	58	41	28				28
RBW	Lee Geon-min (이건민)^{38} ^{52}	38	B	3	18	5	6	8	8	14	16	19		19
RBW	Lee Jae-joon (이재준)	66	C	35	7	19	18	27	33	46				46
RBW	Park Hyeon-gyu (박현규)^{36}	50	B	38	22	35	33	55	32	37				37
STARO Entertainment	Kim Sang-won (김상원)^{13}	48	B	25	6	25	21	31	30	31				31
STARO Entertainment	Song Han-kyeom (송한겸)^{13}	5	9	16	11	14	9	15	10	7	5	7	6	6
START Entertainment	Baek Jin (백진)^{14} ^{49}	36	B	52	40	45	40	71	38	38				38
The Jackie Chan Group Korea	Kim Young-jin (김영진)^{8}	56	C	60	51	60	65	118						65
The Music Works	Kim Kook-heon (김국헌)^{12} ^{49}	2	9	42	8	38	36	60	36	25	21	18	18	18
The Music Works	Kim Sang-jin (김상진)^{12}	18	A	54	30	55	54	100						54
The Music Works	Shin Jun-seob (신준섭)^{12}	49	B	26	14	21	22	32	25	36				36
Urban Music	Jung Seong-cheol (정성철)^{15}	70	C	71	60	69	70	128						70
WM Entertainment	Kim Hyo-jin (김효진)^{16}	1	9	2	2	2	2	3	2	3	2	1	2	2
WM Entertainment	Kim Min-seok (김민석)^{16}	16	A	5	37	6	5	7	4	4	7	4	7	7
WM Entertainment	Lee Chang-yun (이창윤)^{16}	14	A	11	53	12	12	19	17	29				29
WM Entertainment	Lee Seung-jun (이승준)^{16}	53	C	4	27	4	4	6	7	6	11	10	11	11
WM Entertainment	Yuto Mizuguchi (미즈구치 유토)^{16}	11	A	9	9	10	11	18	14	16	23	23		23
WM Entertainment	Park Min-gyun (박민균)^{16}	29	A	8	35	9	14	21	15	19	24	22		22
WM Entertainment	Shim Jae-young (심재영)^{16}	35	B	7	34	8	10	16	16	17	15	13	13	13
WYNN Entertainment	Kim Dong-yoon (김동윤)^{53}	39	B	31	31	31	30	51	24	24	18	21		21
YG Entertainment	Choi Hyeon-seok (최현석) ^{54}	4	9	17	4	15	8	14	12	9	6	5	5	5
YG Entertainment	Kim Jun-gyu (김준규)^{54}	45	B	37	39	32	31	53	34	35				35
YG Entertainment	Lee Byeong-gon (이병곤)^{55}	21	A	28	38	27	25	40	23	22	13	8	9	9
YNB Entertainment	Park Seung-jun (박승준)^{17}	68	C	15	72	28	19	28	22	32				32
YNB Entertainment	Jung In-seong (정인성)^{17}	12	A	23	70	29	27	43	26	20	26	26		26
YNB Entertainment	Oh Hee-jun (오희준)^{17}	46	B	24	71	18	32	54	37	23	25	24		24

=== Contestant notes ===
- ^{1}Former C-Clown member
- ^{2}A.C.E member
- ^{3}BLK member
- ^{4}24K member
- ^{5}Be.A member
- ^{6}High4 member
- ^{7}Romeo member
- ^{8}JJCC member
- ^{9}Varsity member
- ^{10}Former Boys24 member
- ^{11}Former Speed member
- ^{12}Myteen member
- ^{13}Seven O'Clock member
- ^{14}Former Underdog member
- ^{15}5NL member
- ^{16}ONF member
- ^{17}KNK member
- ^{18}Favorite member
- ^{19}Loona member
- ^{20}Playback member
- ^{21}Dreamcatcher member
- ^{22}Elris member
- ^{23}Highteen member
- ^{24}Berry Good member
- ^{25}4Ten member
- ^{26}Bonus Baby member
- ^{27}Cocosori member
- ^{28}Former The SeeYa member
- ^{29}Former F-ve Dolls member
- ^{30}H.U.B member
- ^{31}Sol-T member
- ^{32}2Eyes member
- ^{33}Former D.Holic member
- ^{34}Former As 1 member
- ^{35}Seeart member
- ^{36}Vromance member
- ^{37}Former Wassup member
- ^{38}Former Produce 101 Season 2 contestant
- ^{39}Former Produce 101 contestant
- ^{40}Unaired Auditions
- ^{41}Incomplete Auditions
- ^{42}Former K-pop Star 6: The Last Chance contestant
- ^{43}The Idolmaster KR
- ^{44}Mont member
- ^{45}Black Mamba member
- ^{46}TREI member
- ^{47}Unine member
- ^{48}D1CE member
- ^{49}Former Produce X 101 contestant
- ^{50}Ateez member
- ^{51}1Team member
- ^{52}Oneus member
- ^{53}Spectrum member
- ^{54}Treasure member
- ^{55}CIX member
- ^{56}Itzy member
- ^{57}NeonPunch member
- ^{58}Weeekly member
- ^{59}Former Produce 48 contestant
- ^{60}Secret Number member
- ^{61}Purple Kiss member
- ^{62}Ghost9 member
- ^{63}Former AQUA member
- ^{64}Former Coed School member
- ^{65}Debuted as solo act Isabella
- ^{66}Omega X member
- ^{67}Billlie member
- ^{68}Trendz member
- ^{69}TAN member
- ^{70}8Turn member

== Position Battle (Episode 5-6) ==
Color key

- Boys Team
- Girls Team

The members of the winning teams; KkoJjing, Seven Stars, Benefit, Nerd'$, HotSpot, HighQualityst, Mazinger, Bivid, and Cuxy, received a 2000-point benefit.

Round	Position	Winner	Team Name	Song	Artist	Members	Rank	Votes	Total
1	Vocal	KkoJjing	Shining Girls	It Hurts	2NE1	Shin Ji-yoon	1	N/A	2366
1	Vocal	KkoJjing	Shining Girls	It Hurts	2NE1	Kim Min-kyung	2	N/A	2366
1	Vocal	KkoJjing	Shining Girls	It Hurts	2NE1	Kim Yoo-hyeon	3	N/A	2366
1	Vocal	KkoJjing	Shining Girls	It Hurts	2NE1	Moon Seung-you	4	N/A	2366
1	Vocal	KkoJjing	Shining Girls	It Hurts	2NE1	Lee Hyang-sook	5	N/A	2366
1	Vocal	KkoJjing	Shining Girls	It Hurts	2NE1	Kim Soo-yeon	6	N/A	2366
1	Vocal	KkoJjing	Shining Girls	It Hurts	2NE1	Kim Young-seo	7	N/A	2366
1	Vocal	KkoJjing	Shining Girls	It Hurts	2NE1	Kang Si-hyun	8	N/A	2366
1	Vocal	KkoJjing	Shining Girls	It Hurts	2NE1	Lee Seung-mee	9	N/A	2366
1	Vocal	KkoJjing	Shining Girls	It Hurts	2NE1	Hwang Woo-lim	10	N/A	2366
1	Vocal	KkoJjing	Shining Girls	It Hurts	2NE1	Jo You-ri	11	N/A	2366
1	Vocal	KkoJjing	KkoJjing	It's Ok	BToB	Kim Hyo-jin	1	N/A	4712
1	Vocal	KkoJjing	KkoJjing	It's Ok	BToB	Choi Jong-ho	2	N/A	4712
1	Vocal	KkoJjing	KkoJjing	It's Ok	BToB	Kim Jun-kyu	3	N/A	4712
1	Vocal	KkoJjing	KkoJjing	It's Ok	BToB	Kim Kook-heon	4	N/A	4712
1	Vocal	KkoJjing	KkoJjing	It's Ok	BToB	Kim Hong-joong	5	N/A	4712
1	Vocal	KkoJjing	KkoJjing	It's Ok	BToB	Kim Jin-hong	6	N/A	4712
1	Vocal	KkoJjing	KkoJjing	It's Ok	BToB	Lee Ha-bit	7	N/A	4712
1	Vocal	KkoJjing	KkoJjing	It's Ok	BToB	Kim Seung-min	8	N/A	4712
2	Rap	Seven Stars	9ood 9irl	My Number	Cheetah	Lee Ji-eun	1	N/A	1352
2	Rap	Seven Stars	9ood 9irl	My Number	Cheetah	Park Hae-young	2	N/A	1352
2	Rap	Seven Stars	9ood 9irl	My Number	Cheetah	Lee Yu-bin	3	N/A	1352
2	Rap	Seven Stars	9ood 9irl	My Number	Cheetah	Kim Hyun-jung	4	N/A	1352
2	Rap	Seven Stars	9ood 9irl	My Number	Cheetah	Lim Ji-hye	5	N/A	1352
2	Rap	Seven Stars	9ood 9irl	My Number	Cheetah	Park Cho-hyeon	5	N/A	1352
2	Rap	Seven Stars	9ood 9irl	My Number	Cheetah	Shin Su-hyun	7	N/A	1352
2	Rap	Seven Stars	Seven Stars	Born Hater	Epik High	Woo Jin-young	1	1378	3868
2	Rap	Seven Stars	Seven Stars	Born Hater	Epik High	Choi Hyeon-seok	2	1156	3868
2	Rap	Seven Stars	Seven Stars	Born Hater	Epik High	Shim Jae-young	3	512	3868
2	Rap	Seven Stars	Seven Stars	Born Hater	Epik High	Kim Sang-won	4	410	3868
2	Rap	Seven Stars	Seven Stars	Born Hater	Epik High	Jin Seong-ho	5	204	3868
2	Rap	Seven Stars	Seven Stars	Born Hater	Epik High	Lee Byeong-gon	6	122	3868
2	Rap	Seven Stars	Seven Stars	Born Hater	Epik High	Kim Jae-oh	7	80	3868
3	Dance	Benefit	Benefit	Boombayah	Blackpink	Shin Ryu-jin	1	1154	4544
3	Dance	Benefit	Benefit	Boombayah	Blackpink	Kim Min-ji	2	1144	4544
3	Dance	Benefit	Benefit	Boombayah	Blackpink	Rui Watanabe	3	746	4544
3	Dance	Benefit	Benefit	Boombayah	Blackpink	Jung Ha-yoon	4	402	4544
3	Dance	Benefit	Benefit	Boombayah	Blackpink	Choi Ji-seon	5	340	4544
3	Dance	Benefit	Benefit	Boombayah	Blackpink	Kim Hee-su	6	316	4544
3	Dance	Benefit	Benefit	Boombayah	Blackpink	Kim Sung-eun	7	106	4544
3	Dance	Benefit	Benefit	Boombayah	Blackpink	Lee Yong-chae	8	76	4544
3	Dance	Benefit	Benefit	Boombayah	Blackpink	Lee Su-hyun	9	68	4544
3	Dance	Benefit	Benefit	Boombayah	Blackpink	Bang Ye-sol	10	66	4544
3	Dance	Benefit	Benefit	Boombayah	Blackpink	Ahn Han-byul	11		4544
3	Dance	Benefit	Benefit	Boombayah	Blackpink	Park Ga-eun	12		4544
3	Dance	Benefit	PsychoPass	Very Good	Block B	Kim Byeong-kwan	1	1426	4294
3	Dance	Benefit	PsychoPass	Very Good	Block B	Kim Min-hak	2	650	4294
3	Dance	Benefit	PsychoPass	Very Good	Block B	Lee Seung-jun	3	622	4294
3	Dance	Benefit	PsychoPass	Very Good	Block B	Kim Min-seok	4	406	4294
3	Dance	Benefit	PsychoPass	Very Good	Block B	Baek Jin	5	400	4294
3	Dance	Benefit	PsychoPass	Very Good	Block B	Kim Jun-hoe	6	366	4294
3	Dance	Benefit	PsychoPass	Very Good	Block B	Jung Woo-young	7	168	4294
3	Dance	Benefit	PsychoPass	Very Good	Block B	Han Jong-yeon	8		4294
3	Dance	Benefit	PsychoPass	Very Good	Block B	Manny	9		4294
4	Rap	Nerd'$	Auh~!	Puss	Jimin	Jeong Sa-ra	1	1044	1984
4	Rap	Nerd'$	Auh~!	Puss	Jimin	Kwak Hee-o	2	320	1984
4	Rap	Nerd'$	Auh~!	Puss	Jimin	Choi Yoon-a	3	176	1984
4	Rap	Nerd'$	Auh~!	Puss	Jimin	Han Gyeo-ul			1984
4	Rap	Nerd'$	Auh~!	Puss	Jimin	Chaung Da-sol			1984
4	Rap	Nerd'$	Auh~!	Puss	Jimin	Shin Ji-won			1984
4	Rap	Nerd'$	Auh~!	Puss	Jimin	Seo Ji-heun			1984
4	Rap	Nerd'$	Nerd'$	Okey Dokey	Mino ft. Zico	Woo Tae-woon	1	1052	3404
4	Rap	Nerd'$	Nerd'$	Okey Dokey	Mino ft. Zico	Chae Chang-hyeon			3404
4	Rap	Nerd'$	Nerd'$	Okey Dokey	Mino ft. Zico	Im Young-jun			3404
4	Rap	Nerd'$	Nerd'$	Okey Dokey	Mino ft. Zico	Lee Jae-jun			3404
4	Rap	Nerd'$	Nerd'$	Okey Dokey	Mino ft. Zico	Shin Jung-min			3404
4	Rap	Nerd'$	Nerd'$	Okey Dokey	Mino ft. Zico	Song Min-ki			3404
4	Rap	Nerd'$	Nerd'$	Okey Dokey	Mino ft. Zico	Moon Young-seo			3404
5	Dance	HotSpot	HotSpot	Starships	Nicki Minaj	Kim Hyun-jin	1		4738
5	Dance	HotSpot	HotSpot	Starships	Nicki Minaj	Yang Hye-seon	2	974	4738
5	Dance	HotSpot	HotSpot	Starships	Nicki Minaj	Lee Ha-young	3	706	4738
5	Dance	HotSpot	HotSpot	Starships	Nicki Minaj	Choi Ha-young	4	580	4738
5	Dance	HotSpot	HotSpot	Starships	Nicki Minaj	Han Byul			4738
5	Dance	HotSpot	HotSpot	Starships	Nicki Minaj	Jung Ye-eun			4738
5	Dance	HotSpot	HotSpot	Starships	Nicki Minaj	Jang Eun-seong			4738
5	Dance	HotSpot	HotSpot	Starships	Nicki Minaj	Lee Bom			4738
5	Dance	HotSpot	HotSpot	Starships	Nicki Minaj	Yoo Ha-jung			4738
5	Dance	HotSpot	HotSpot	Starships	Nicki Minaj	Park Ji-woo			4738
5	Dance	HotSpot	HotSpot	Starships	Nicki Minaj	Park Eun-jo			4738
5	Dance	HotSpot	HotSpot	Starships	Nicki Minaj	Mizuki Ogawa			4738
5	Dance	HotSpot	HotSpot	Starships	Nicki Minaj	Rena Sekioka			4738
5	Dance	HotSpot	One Way	What Makes You Beautiful	One Direction	Kim Sang-jin	1	1298	3630
5	Dance	HotSpot	One Way	What Makes You Beautiful	One Direction	Kim Young-jo	2	712	3630
5	Dance	HotSpot	One Way	What Makes You Beautiful	One Direction	Jo Han-gook			3630
5	Dance	HotSpot	One Way	What Makes You Beautiful	One Direction	Jeong Seung-bo			3630
5	Dance	HotSpot	One Way	What Makes You Beautiful	One Direction	Son Jun-hyeong			3630
5	Dance	HotSpot	One Way	What Makes You Beautiful	One Direction	Kim Young-jin			3630
5	Dance	HotSpot	One Way	What Makes You Beautiful	One Direction	Kim Sang-yeon			3630
5	Dance	HotSpot	One Way	What Makes You Beautiful	One Direction	Kim Dong-hyun			3630
6	Vocal	HighQualityst	Frontal Breakthrough	Singing Got Better	Ailee	Hwang Ji-min	N/A	N/A	2920
6	Vocal	HighQualityst	Frontal Breakthrough	Singing Got Better	Ailee	Hong Joo-hyun	N/A	N/A	2920
6	Vocal	HighQualityst	Frontal Breakthrough	Singing Got Better	Ailee	Choi Soo-jung	N/A	N/A	2920
6	Vocal	HighQualityst	Frontal Breakthrough	Singing Got Better	Ailee	Choi Ye-im	N/A	N/A	2920
6	Vocal	HighQualityst	Frontal Breakthrough	Singing Got Better	Ailee	Jang Hyo-gyeong	N/A	N/A	2920
6	Vocal	HighQualityst	Frontal Breakthrough	Singing Got Better	Ailee	Lee Si-yeon	N/A	N/A	2920
6	Vocal	HighQualityst	Frontal Breakthrough	Singing Got Better	Ailee	Yeo In-hye	N/A	N/A	2920
6	Vocal	HighQualityst	Frontal Breakthrough	Singing Got Better	Ailee	Song Ji-eun	N/A	N/A	2920
6	Vocal	HighQualityst	Frontal Breakthrough	Singing Got Better	Ailee	Kim Yun-ji	N/A	N/A	2920
6	Vocal	HighQualityst	Frontal Breakthrough	Singing Got Better	Ailee	Kim Yoon-yeon	N/A	N/A	2920
6	Vocal	HighQualityst	Frontal Breakthrough	Singing Got Better	Ailee	Go Jeong-hee	N/A	N/A	2920
6	Vocal	HighQualityst	HighQualityst	Love In The Ice	DBSK	Jeong In-seong	N/A	N/A	3754
6	Vocal	HighQualityst	HighQualityst	Love In The Ice	DBSK	Lee Chang-yun	N/A	N/A	3754
6	Vocal	HighQualityst	HighQualityst	Love In The Ice	DBSK	Lee Chan-dong	N/A	N/A	3754
6	Vocal	HighQualityst	HighQualityst	Love In The Ice	DBSK	Lee Dong-hun	N/A	N/A	3754
6	Vocal	HighQualityst	HighQualityst	Love In The Ice	DBSK	Lee Geon-min	N/A	N/A	3754
6	Vocal	HighQualityst	HighQualityst	Love In The Ice	DBSK	Oh Hee-jun	N/A	N/A	3754
6	Vocal	HighQualityst	HighQualityst	Love In The Ice	DBSK	Park Hyun-kyu	N/A	N/A	3754
6	Vocal	HighQualityst	HighQualityst	Love In The Ice	DBSK	Kim Hyun-su	N/A	N/A	3754
7	Dance	MaJingKa	Mix Nice	Knock Knock	Twice	Choi Moon-hee	N/A	N/A	2806
7	Dance	MaJingKa	Mix Nice	Knock Knock	Twice	Jeong Yoo-jeong	N/A	N/A	2806
7	Dance	MaJingKa	Mix Nice	Knock Knock	Twice	Jeon Yu-jin	N/A	N/A	2806
7	Dance	MaJingKa	Mix Nice	Knock Knock	Twice	Lim Jeong-min	N/A	N/A	2806
7	Dance	MaJingKa	Mix Nice	Knock Knock	Twice	Lee Su-jin	N/A	N/A	2806
7	Dance	MaJingKa	Mix Nice	Knock Knock	Twice	Baek Hye-jin	N/A	N/A	2806
7	Dance	MaJingKa	Mix Nice	Knock Knock	Twice	Baek Min-seo	N/A	N/A	2806
7	Dance	MaJingKa	Mix Nice	Knock Knock	Twice	Park So-eun	N/A	N/A	2806
7	Dance	MaJingKa	Mix Nice	Knock Knock	Twice	Kim Chae-hyun	N/A	N/A	2806
7	Dance	MaJingKa	Mix Nice	Knock Knock	Twice	Kim Su-a	N/A	N/A	2806
7	Dance	MaJingKa	Mix Nice	Knock Knock	Twice	Kim Bo-won	N/A	N/A	2806
7	Dance	MaJingKa	Mix Nice	Knock Knock	Twice	Kim Min-ju	N/A	N/A	2806
7	Dance	MaJingKa	Mix Nice	Knock Knock	Twice	Kim Da-yoon	N/A	N/A	2806
7	Dance	MaJingKa	Mazinger	My House	2PM	Song Han-kyeom	1	1280	5290
7	Dance	MaJingKa	Mazinger	My House	2PM	Kim Se-yoon	2	1222	5290
7	Dance	MaJingKa	Mazinger	My House	2PM	Shin Jun-seop	3	1068	5290
7	Dance	MaJingKa	Mazinger	My House	2PM	Yao Ming-ming	4	546	5290
7	Dance	MaJingKa	Mazinger	My House	2PM	Kazuhiro Hiyama	5	392	5290
7	Dance	MaJingKa	Mazinger	My House	2PM	Park Seung-jun	6	298	5290
7	Dance	MaJingKa	Mazinger	My House	2PM	Kim Dong-yoon	7	176	5290
7	Dance	MaJingKa	Mazinger	My House	2PM	Kim Hyun-jong	8	176	5290
7	Dance	MaJingKa	Mazinger	My House	2PM	Park Seong-hyun	9	132	5290
8	Vocal	Bivid	Bivid	Rain	Taeyeon	Im So-hyun	1	866	3926
8	Vocal	Bivid	Bivid	Rain	Taeyeon	Kim Ju-yeon	2	598	3926
8	Vocal	Bivid	Bivid	Rain	Taeyeon	Nam Yu-jin	3	462	3926
8	Vocal	Bivid	Bivid	Rain	Taeyeon	Yukika Teramoto	4	438	3926
8	Vocal	Bivid	Bivid	Rain	Taeyeon	Park Hae-rin	5	400	3926
8	Vocal	Bivid	Bivid	Rain	Taeyeon	Go Ah-ra	6	376	3926
8	Vocal	Bivid	Bivid	Rain	Taeyeon	Kim Su-hyun	7	368	3926
8	Vocal	Bivid	Bivid	Rain	Taeyeon	Baek Da-ae	8	172	3926
8	Vocal	Bivid	Bivid	Rain	Taeyeon	Moon Eun-jin	9	102	3926
8	Vocal	Bivid	Bivid	Rain	Taeyeon	Heo Young-joo	10		3926
8	Vocal	Bivid	Bivid	Rain	Taeyeon	Lee Ye-sol	11		3926
8	Vocal	Bivid	Red Socks	Day One	K.Will	Lee Ru-bin	1	1088	3094
8	Vocal	Bivid	Red Socks	Day One	K.Will	Park Min-kyun	2	786	3094
8	Vocal	Bivid	Red Socks	Day One	K.Will	Jeong Hyun-woo	3	526	3094
8	Vocal	Bivid	Red Socks	Day One	K.Will	Ma Jae-kyung	4	186	3094
8	Vocal	Bivid	Red Socks	Day One	K.Will	Yoon Yong-bin	5	172	3094
8	Vocal	Bivid	Red Socks	Day One	K.Will	Hwang Yu-seong	6	144	3094
8	Vocal	Bivid	Red Socks	Day One	K.Will	Kim Seo-yeon	7		3094
8	Vocal	Bivid	Red Socks	Day One	K.Will	Jeong Seong-cheol	8		3094
9	Dance	CuXy	CuXy	Greedy	Ariana Grande	Heo Chan-mi	N/A	N/A	4978
9	Dance	CuXy	CuXy	Greedy	Ariana Grande	Jeon Hee-jin	N/A	N/A	4978
9	Dance	CuXy	CuXy	Greedy	Ariana Grande	Lee Ye-eun	N/A	N/A	4978
9	Dance	CuXy	CuXy	Greedy	Ariana Grande	Lee Yeo-reum	N/A	N/A	4978
9	Dance	CuXy	CuXy	Greedy	Ariana Grande	Lee Soo-min	N/A	N/A	4978
9	Dance	CuXy	CuXy	Greedy	Ariana Grande	Ng Sze Kai	N/A	N/A	4978
9	Dance	CuXy	CuXy	Greedy	Ariana Grande	Yu Jin-kyung	N/A	N/A	4978
9	Dance	CuXy	CuXy	Greedy	Ariana Grande	Ahn Da-bi	N/A	N/A	4978
9	Dance	CuXy	CuXy	Greedy	Ariana Grande	Seo Yu-ri	N/A	N/A	4978
9	Dance	CuXy	CuXy	Greedy	Ariana Grande	Baek Hyun-joo	N/A	N/A	4978
9	Dance	CuXy	CuXy	Greedy	Ariana Grande	Park Soo-min	N/A	N/A	4978
9	Dance	CuXy	CuXy	Greedy	Ariana Grande	Kim Si-hyeon	N/A	N/A	4978
9	Dance	CuXy	CuXy	Greedy	Ariana Grande	Kim So-ri	N/A	N/A	4978
9	Dance	CuXy	Just8	Kiss the Sky	Jason Derulo	Jo Yong-gun	N/A	N/A	3766
9	Dance	CuXy	Just8	Kiss the Sky	Jason Derulo	Jo Young-ho	N/A	N/A	3766
9	Dance	CuXy	Just8	Kiss the Sky	Jason Derulo	Lee Chang-seon	N/A	N/A	3766
9	Dance	CuXy	Just8	Kiss the Sky	Jason Derulo	Lee Jae-joon	N/A	N/A	3766
9	Dance	CuXy	Just8	Kiss the Sky	Jason Derulo	Yoon Jae-hee	N/A	N/A	3766
9	Dance	CuXy	Just8	Kiss the Sky	Jason Derulo	Yuto Mizuguchi	N/A	N/A	3766
9	Dance	CuXy	Just8	Kiss the Sky	Jason Derulo	Moon Jae-yoon	N/A	N/A	3766
9	Dance	CuXy	Just8	Kiss the Sky	Jason Derulo	Kim Han-kyeol	N/A	N/A	3766

== Formation Battle (Episode 8-10) ==
=== Females ===
Song	Artist	Team Name	Members	Rank	Votes	Total	Result
Genie	Girls' Generation	Lady Luck	Baek Hyun-joo	1	570	5822	4th Place; 3,000 Point Benefit
Genie	Girls' Generation	Lady Luck	Kim Soo-hyun	2	368	5822	4th Place; 3,000 Point Benefit
Genie	Girls' Generation	Lady Luck	Choi Ha-young	3	316	5822	4th Place; 3,000 Point Benefit
Genie	Girls' Generation	Lady Luck	Jeon Hee-jin	4	216	5822	4th Place; 3,000 Point Benefit
Genie	Girls' Generation	Lady Luck	Kim So-ri	5	198	5822	4th Place; 3,000 Point Benefit
Genie	Girls' Generation	Lady Luck	Park Hae-rin	6	92	5822	4th Place; 3,000 Point Benefit
Genie	Girls' Generation	Lady Luck	Go Ah-ra	7	54	5822	4th Place; 3,000 Point Benefit
Genie	Girls' Generation	Lady Luck	Kim Young-seo	8	46	5822	4th Place; 3,000 Point Benefit
Genie	Girls' Generation	Lady Luck	Kim Yoon-ji	9	34	5822	4th Place; 3,000 Point Benefit
('Cause) I'm Your Girl	S.E.S.	Girlfriend	Park Soo-min	1	556	6164	3rd Place; 5,000 Point Benefit
('Cause) I'm Your Girl	S.E.S.	Girlfriend	Kim Hyun-jin	2	452	6164	3rd Place; 5,000 Point Benefit
('Cause) I'm Your Girl	S.E.S.	Girlfriend	Kim Min-kyung	3	374	6164	3rd Place; 5,000 Point Benefit
('Cause) I'm Your Girl	S.E.S.	Girlfriend	Park Hae-young	4	172	6164	3rd Place; 5,000 Point Benefit
('Cause) I'm Your Girl	S.E.S.	Girlfriend	Nam Yu-jin	5	100	6164	3rd Place; 5,000 Point Benefit
('Cause) I'm Your Girl	S.E.S.	Girlfriend	Ng Sze Kai	6	92	6164	3rd Place; 5,000 Point Benefit
('Cause) I'm Your Girl	S.E.S.	Girlfriend	Kim Hyun-jung	7	72	6164	3rd Place; 5,000 Point Benefit
('Cause) I'm Your Girl	S.E.S.	Girlfriend	Shin Ji-won	8	44	6164	3rd Place; 5,000 Point Benefit
('Cause) I'm Your Girl	S.E.S.	Girlfriend	Go Jung-hee	9	26	6164	3rd Place; 5,000 Point Benefit
Bad Girl Good Girl	Miss A	Your Girl	Jung Sa-ra	1	752	8024	1st Place; 10,000 Point Benefit
Bad Girl Good Girl	Miss A	Your Girl	Lee Ha-young	2	384	8024	1st Place; 10,000 Point Benefit
Bad Girl Good Girl	Miss A	Your Girl	Lee Su-jin	3	380	8024	1st Place; 10,000 Point Benefit
Bad Girl Good Girl	Miss A	Your Girl	Kim Min-ju	8	44	8024	1st Place; 10,000 Point Benefit
Bad Girl Good Girl	Miss A	Your Girl	Jung Ha-yoon	5	82	8024	1st Place; 10,000 Point Benefit
Bad Girl Good Girl	Miss A	Your Girl	Hwang Ji-min	6	54	8024	1st Place; 10,000 Point Benefit
Bad Girl Good Girl	Miss A	Your Girl	Jang Hyo-kyung	7	52	8024	1st Place; 10,000 Point Benefit
Bad Girl Good Girl	Miss A	Your Girl	Kim Si-hyun	4	84	8024	1st Place; 10,000 Point Benefit
Bad Girl Good Girl	Miss A	Your Girl	Kim Yoon-young	9	40	8024	1st Place; 10,000 Point Benefit
Really Really	Winner	Find Really	Shin Ryu-jin	1	994	7798	2nd Place; 7,000 Point Benefit
Really Really	Winner	Find Really	Lee Young-chae	2	314	7798	2nd Place; 7,000 Point Benefit
Really Really	Winner	Find Really	Rui	3	136	7798	2nd Place; 7,000 Point Benefit
Really Really	Winner	Find Really	Lee Soo-min	4	120	7798	2nd Place; 7,000 Point Benefit
Really Really	Winner	Find Really	Choi Moon-hee	5	114	7798	2nd Place; 7,000 Point Benefit
Really Really	Winner	Find Really	Heo Chan-mi	6	78	7798	2nd Place; 7,000 Point Benefit
Really Really	Winner	Find Really	Choi Yoon-A	7	78	7798	2nd Place; 7,000 Point Benefit
Really Really	Winner	Find Really	Kim Bo-won	8	16	7798	2nd Place; 7,000 Point Benefit
Really Really	Winner	Find Really	Kang Si-Hyun	9	14	7798	2nd Place; 7,000 Point Benefit
Really Really	Winner	Find Really	Kim Su-ah	10	14	7798	2nd Place; 7,000 Point Benefit
Honey	Kara	Sleep	Lee Ji-eun	1	684	5395	5th Place; No Benefit
Honey	Kara	Sleep	Yukika	2	392	5395	5th Place; No Benefit
Honey	Kara	Sleep	Lee Hyang-sook	3	340	5395	5th Place; No Benefit
Honey	Kara	Sleep	Shin Ji-yoon	4	92	5395	5th Place; No Benefit
Honey	Kara	Sleep	Im Su-hyun	5	88	5395	5th Place; No Benefit
Honey	Kara	Sleep	Yang Hye-seong	6	86	5395	5th Place; No Benefit
Honey	Kara	Sleep	Im Jeong-min	7	84	5395	5th Place; No Benefit
Honey	Kara	Sleep	Yuu Jin-kyung	8	46	5395	5th Place; No Benefit
Honey	Kara	Sleep	Kim Da-yoon	9	36	5395	5th Place; No Benefit

=== Males ===
Song	Artist	Team Name	Members	Rank	Votes	Total	Result
Hug	TVXQ	Hug'$	Lee Byeong-gon	1	836	7323	4th Place; 3,000 Point Benefit
Hug	TVXQ	Hug'$	Shim Jae-young	2	348	7323	4th Place; 3,000 Point Benefit
Hug	TVXQ	Hug'$	Kim Hyun-soo	3	154	7323	4th Place; 3,000 Point Benefit
Hug	TVXQ	Hug'$	Lee Ru-bin	4	150	7323	4th Place; 3,000 Point Benefit
Hug	TVXQ	Hug'$	Kim Sang-won	5	64	7323	4th Place; 3,000 Point Benefit
Hug	TVXQ	Hug'$	Hwang Yoon-sung	6	62	7323	4th Place; 3,000 Point Benefit
Hug	TVXQ	Hug'$	Chae Chang-hyun	7	58	7323	4th Place; 3,000 Point Benefit
Hug	TVXQ	Hug'$	Park Min-kyun	7	58	7323	4th Place; 3,000 Point Benefit
Hug	TVXQ	Hug'$	Park Hyun-gyu	9	48	7323	4th Place; 3,000 Point Benefit
Hug	TVXQ	Hug'$	Kim Jun-kyu	10	32	7323	4th Place; 3,000 Point Benefit
Ringa Linga	Taeyang	Taeyangyeol	Choi Hyun-suk	1	586	8015	2nd Place; 7,000 Point Benefit
Ringa Linga	Taeyang	Taeyangyeol	Kim Min-seok	2	456	8015	2nd Place; 7,000 Point Benefit
Ringa Linga	Taeyang	Taeyangyeol	Jin Seong-ho	3	344	8015	2nd Place; 7,000 Point Benefit
Ringa Linga	Taeyang	Taeyangyeol	Kim Kook-heon	4	148	8015	2nd Place; 7,000 Point Benefit
Ringa Linga	Taeyang	Taeyangyeol	Woo Tae-woon	5	88	8015	2nd Place; 7,000 Point Benefit
Ringa Linga	Taeyang	Taeyangyeol	Kim Se-yoon	6	78	8015	2nd Place; 7,000 Point Benefit
Ringa Linga	Taeyang	Taeyangyeol	Baek Jin	7	48	8015	2nd Place; 7,000 Point Benefit
Ringa Linga	Taeyang	Taeyangyeol	Park Seong-hyun	7	48	8015	2nd Place; 7,000 Point Benefit
Ringa Linga	Taeyang	Taeyangyeol	Kim Hong-joong	9	34	8015	2nd Place; 7,000 Point Benefit
Ringa Linga	Taeyang	Taeyangyeol	Choi Jong-ho	10	26	8015	2nd Place; 7,000 Point Benefit
It's You	Super Junior	It's You	Lee Jae-jun (Banana Culture)	1	846	6459	5th Place; No Benefit
It's You	Super Junior	It's You	Lee Geon-min	2	332	6459	5th Place; No Benefit
It's You	Super Junior	It's You	Lee Chang-yun	3	154	6459	5th Place; No Benefit
It's You	Super Junior	It's You	Park Seung-jun	3	154	6459	5th Place; No Benefit
It's You	Super Junior	It's You	Lee Jae-joon (RBW)	5	96	6459	5th Place; No Benefit
It's You	Super Junior	It's You	Yoon Jae-hee	6	78	6459	5th Place; No Benefit
It's You	Super Junior	It's You	Shin Jun-seop	7	66	6459	5th Place; No Benefit
It's You	Super Junior	It's You	Moon Jae-yoon	7	66	6459	5th Place; No Benefit
It's You	Super Junior	It's You	Jo Young-ho	9	46	6459	5th Place; No Benefit
It's You	Super Junior	It's You	Lee Ha-bit	10	40	6459	5th Place; No Benefit
It's You	Super Junior	It's You	Yoon Yong-bin	11	20	6459	5th Place; No Benefit
Paradise Lost	Gain	Apricot Flavor	Kim Byeong-kwan	1	882	8207	1st Place; 10,000
Paradise Lost	Gain	Apricot Flavor	Oh Hee-jun	2	346	8207	1st Place; 10,000
Paradise Lost	Gain	Apricot Flavor	Woo Jin-young	3	186	8207	1st Place; 10,000
Paradise Lost	Gain	Apricot Flavor	Lee Seung-jun	4	148	8207	1st Place; 10,000
Paradise Lost	Gain	Apricot Flavor	Kim Hyung-jong	5	52	8207	1st Place; 10,000
Paradise Lost	Gain	Apricot Flavor	Yao Ming-Ming	6	50	8207	1st Place; 10,000
Paradise Lost	Gain	Apricot Flavor	Jeong In-seong	7	48	8207	1st Place; 10,000
Paradise Lost	Gain	Apricot Flavor	Kim Yeong-jo	8	44	8207	1st Place; 10,000
Paradise Lost	Gain	Apricot Flavor	Lee Chan-dong	9	36	8207	1st Place; 10,000
Paradise Lost	Gain	Apricot Flavor	Jo Yong-geun	10	12	8207	1st Place; 10,000
Bang Bang Bang	BigBang	King Wang Jjang	Song Han-gyeom	1	350	7719	3rd Place 5,000 Point Benefit
Bang Bang Bang	BigBang	King Wang Jjang	Yuto	2	336	7719	3rd Place 5,000 Point Benefit
Bang Bang Bang	BigBang	King Wang Jjang	Jeon Hyun-woo	3	322	7719	3rd Place 5,000 Point Benefit
Bang Bang Bang	BigBang	King Wang Jjang	Im Yeong-joon	4	310	7719	3rd Place 5,000 Point Benefit
Bang Bang Bang	BigBang	King Wang Jjang	Kim Hyo-jin	5	138	7719	3rd Place 5,000 Point Benefit
Bang Bang Bang	BigBang	King Wang Jjang	Lee Dong-hun	6	82	7719	3rd Place 5,000 Point Benefit
Bang Bang Bang	BigBang	King Wang Jjang	Kim Jun-hee	7	76	7719	3rd Place 5,000 Point Benefit
Bang Bang Bang	BigBang	King Wang Jjang	Kim Dong-yoon	8	70	7719	3rd Place 5,000 Point Benefit
Bang Bang Bang	BigBang	King Wang Jjang	Ma Jae-kyeong	9	56	7719	3rd Place 5,000 Point Benefit
Bang Bang Bang	BigBang	King Wang Jjang	Kim Min-hak	10	40	7719	3rd Place 5,000 Point Benefit
Bang Bang Bang	BigBang	King Wang Jjang	Hiro	11	20	7719	3rd Place 5,000 Point Benefit

== Digital Song Battle (Episode 11-12) ==
10,000 Point Benefit
7,000 Point Benefit
5,000 Point Benefit

=== Female ===
Producer	Song	Team Name	Members	Rank	Votes
MC Mong	After This Night	Good Vibe	Kim Hyun-jin	1	512
MC Mong	After This Night	Good Vibe	Shin Ryu-jin	2	478
MC Mong	After This Night	Good Vibe	Jeon Hee-jin	3	342
MC Mong	After This Night	Good Vibe	Kim Su-hyun	4	336
MC Mong	After This Night	Good Vibe	Kim Min-kyun	5	252
MC Mong	After This Night	Good Vibe	Heo Chan-mi	6	202
MC Mong	After This Night	Good Vibe	Kim Bo-won	7	188
MC Mong	After This Night	Good Vibe	Baek Hyun-ju	8	172
MC Mong	After This Night	Good Vibe	Kim Min-ju	9	106
Kamen Rider, BtoB Illhoon	Hush	My9Beauty	Jung Ha-yoon	1	472
Kamen Rider, BtoB Illhoon	Hush	My9Beauty	Lee Soo-min	2	350
Kamen Rider, BtoB Illhoon	Hush	My9Beauty	Kim Si-hyun	3	308
Kamen Rider, BtoB Illhoon	Hush	My9Beauty	Nam Yu-jin	4	288
Kamen Rider, BtoB Illhoon	Hush	My9Beauty	Choi Yoon-a	5	280
Kamen Rider, BtoB Illhoon	Hush	My9Beauty	Kim So-ri	6	270
Kamen Rider, BtoB Illhoon	Hush	My9Beauty	Choi Moon-hee	7	252
Kamen Rider, BtoB Illhoon	Hush	My9Beauty	Park Soo-min	8	200
Kamen Rider, BtoB Illhoon	Hush	My9Beauty	Kim Su-a	9	144
Kim Dohoon	Dangerous Girl	Rising	Lee Su-jin	1	600
Kim Dohoon	Dangerous Girl	Rising	Hwang Ji-min	2	308
Kim Dohoon	Dangerous Girl	Rising	Jung Sa-ra	3	288
Kim Dohoon	Dangerous Girl	Rising	Shin Ji-won	4	280
Kim Dohoon	Dangerous Girl	Rising	Jang Hyo-gyung	5	270
Kim Dohoon	Dangerous Girl	Rising	Lee Ha-young	6	252
Kim Dohoon	Dangerous Girl	Rising	Go A-ra	7	222
Kim Dohoon	Dangerous Girl	Rising	Lee Ji-eun	8	200
Kim Dohoon	Dangerous Girl	Rising	Rui	9	144

=== Male ===
Producer	Song name	Team Name	Members	Rank	Votes
Future Bounce	Super Freak	Gang-nam Station Exit 10	Kim Byeong-kwan	1	558
Future Bounce	Super Freak	Gang-nam Station Exit 10	Kim Min-seok	2	404
Future Bounce	Super Freak	Gang-nam Station Exit 10	Park Min-kyun	3	290
Future Bounce	Super Freak	Gang-nam Station Exit 10	Yuto	4	262
Future Bounce	Super Freak	Gang-nam Station Exit 10	Kim Dong-yoon	5	258
Future Bounce	Super Freak	Gang-nam Station Exit 10	Oh Hee-jun	6	244
Future Bounce	Super Freak	Gang-nam Station Exit 10	Choi Hyun-suk	7	236
Future Bounce	Super Freak	Gang-nam Station Exit 10	Kim Gook-heon	8	188
Future Bounce	Super Freak	Gang-nam Station Exit 10	Cho Yong-geun	9	170
Kang Eun-jin, LIØN, Diggy	Hand in Hand	Pyeong-chang	Lee Byeong-gon	1	536
Kang Eun-jin, LIØN, Diggy	Hand in Hand	Pyeong-chang	Shim Jae-young	2	314
Kang Eun-jin, LIØN, Diggy	Hand in Hand	Pyeong-chang	Woo Jin-young	3	286
Kang Eun-jin, LIØN, Diggy	Hand in Hand	Pyeong-chang	Lee Seung-jun	4	270
Kang Eun-jin, LIØN, Diggy	Hand in Hand	Pyeong-chang	Kim Young-jo	5	238
Kang Eun-jin, LIØN, Diggy	Hand in Hand	Pyeong-chang	Kim Hyun-su	6	226
Kang Eun-jin, LIØN, Diggy	Hand in Hand	Pyeong-chang	Lee Ru-bin	7	222
Kang Eun-jin, LIØN, Diggy	Hand in Hand	Pyeong-chang	Kim Se-yoon	8	190
Kang Eun-jin, LIØN, Diggy	Hand in Hand	Pyeong-chang	Jin Seong-ho	9	174
MC Mong	Stand By Me	9reat!	Kim Hyo-jin	1	640
MC Mong	Stand By Me	9reat!	Yao Ming Ming	2	328
MC Mong	Stand By Me	9reat!	Lee Jae-jun	3	262
MC Mong	Stand By Me	9reat!	Song Han-gyeom	4	258
MC Mong	Stand By Me	9reat!	Lee Geon-min	5	238
MC Mong	Stand By Me	9reat!	Kim Hyun-jung	6	234
MC Mong	Stand By Me	9reat!	Lee Dong-hun	7	226
MC Mong	Stand By Me	9reat!	Woo Tae-woon	8	202
MC Mong	Stand By Me	9reat!	Jeong In-seong	9	140

== Final Battle (Episode 14) ==
Girls
Song	Team Name	Members
Omona	Universe	Choi Yoo-na
Omona	Universe	Jang Hyo-kyung
Omona	Universe	Jung Ha-yoon
Omona	Universe	Jung Sa-ra
Omona	Universe	Kim Hyun-jin
Omona	Universe	Kim Min-kyung
Omona	Universe	Lee Soo-min
Omona	Universe	Kim So-ri
Omona	Universe	Kim Su-hyun
Come Over	Our House	Baek Hyun-ju
Come Over	Our House	Choi Moon-hee
Come Over	Our House	Hwang Ji-min
Come Over	Our House	Jeon Hee-jin
Come Over	Our House	Kim Bo-won
Come Over	Our House	Lee Ha-young
Come Over	Our House	Nam Yu-jin
Come Over	Our House	Park Soo-min
Come Over	Our House	Shin Ryu-jin

Boys
Song	Team Name	Members
What!?	Top Line	Jin Song-ho
What!?	Top Line	Kim Byeong-kwan
What!?	Top Line	Kim Hyo-jin
What!?	Top Line	Kim Min-seok
What!?	Top Line	Kim Se-yoon
What!?	Top Line	Lee Byong-gon
What!?	Top Line	Lee Dong-hun
What!?	Top Line	Song Han-gyeom
What!?	Top Line	Woo Jin-young
I Like It Too	Like8	Choi Hyun-suk
I Like It Too	Like8	Kim Gook-heon
I Like It Too	Like8	Kim Hyun-jong
I Like It Too	Like8	Kim Hyun-soo
I Like It Too	Like8	Lee Jae-jun
I Like It Too	Like8	Lee Ru-bin
I Like It Too	Like8	Lee Seung-jun
I Like It Too	Like8	Shim Jae-young
I Like It Too	Like8	Yao Ming-ming
