= Jung-woo =

- Hangul: 정우
- RR: Jeongu
- MR: Chŏngu

Jung-woo is a Korean given name.

== People ==
People with this name include:

- Choi Jung-woo (born 1957), South Korean actor
- Park Jung-woo (born 1969), South Korean film director and screenwriter
- Ha Jung-woo (born Kim Sung-hoon, 1979), South Korean actor
- Lim Jung-woo (born 1978), South Korean field hockey player
- Jung Woo (born Kim Jung-guk, 1981), South Korean actor
- Kim Jung-woo (footballer) (born 1982), South Korean football player
- Seo Jeong-wu (1989–2010), one of two South Korean marines killed in the North Korean bombardment of Yeonpyeong
- Kim Jung-woo (singer) (born 1990), South Korean singer
- Kim Jung-woo (born 1998), South Korean singer

Fictional characters with this name include:

- Han Jeong-woo, in 2004 South Korean television series April Kiss
- Seo Jung-woo, in 2005 South Korean television series My Girl
- Lee Jung-woo, in 2010 South Korean television series Athena: Goddess of War
- Han Jung-woo, in 2012 South Korean television series Missing You
- Do Jung-woo, in 2015 South Korean television series Angry Mom
- Yoon Jong-woo, in 2019 South Korean television series Hell Is Other People (TV series)

== See also ==
- List of Korean given names
