= Kim Jung-woo (singer) =

South Korean musician (born 1990)

- 김정우
- Born: Kim Jung-woo; May 9, 1990 (age 36); Daegu, South Korea
- Occupations: Singer; actor
- Musical career
- Genres: K-pop
- Instrument: Vocals
- Years active: 2010–present
- Labels: MBK; Maroo

- Korean name
- Hangul: 김정우
- Hanja: 金正優
- RR: Gim Jeongu
- MR: Kim Chŏngu

Kim Jung-woo (Korean: 김정우; born May 9, 1990) is a South Korean singer and actor. He debuted in 2010 as a member of the band Coed School. In January 2012, he joined SPEED and continued until the group disbanded in 2015. In January 2016, Kim confirmed the expiration of his contract with MBK Entertainment and joined Maroo Entertainment. In November 2017, he auditioned as a trainee on the YG talent show Mix Nine, but he did not enter as a contestant.

== Career ==
Kim won first place in the FNC Music Open Audition Grand Prix 2009 and was a trainee until 2010. He later moved to Core Contents Media and made his debut with Coed School in the same year.

He made his debut as a Coed School member with the stage name "Yoosung" on September 30, 2010 and released their digital single "Too Late", followed by their second digital single "Bbiribbom Bberibbom" three weeks later. The group released the mini album Something That Is Cheerful and Fresh on October 28, 2010. It features three previously released songs and various remixes.

Kim joined the Coed School male unit, Speed, in January 2012 and began using his real name as his stage name. The group made their first performance on Music Bank on February 17, 2012.

In January 2016, Kim announced on his Twitter and Instagram that his contract with MBK Entertainment had expired and that he had parted ways with the company and SPEED, and had joined Maroo Entertainment (Kim Jong Kook's agency). He was one of the 117 trainees who auditioned on the third episode of the YG survival program MIXNINE in November 2017 alongside his Coed School bandmate, Heo Chan-mi, who was one of the 57 female trainees who auditioned.

== Filmography ==
=== Variety shows ===
Year	Title	Network	Role	Notes
2013	Beatles Code 2	Mnet	Guest	with Taewoon, Choi Sungmin and Davichi
2013	Money Tower	Channel A	Contestant	
