= Cho Seung-hee =

South Korean actress (born 1991)

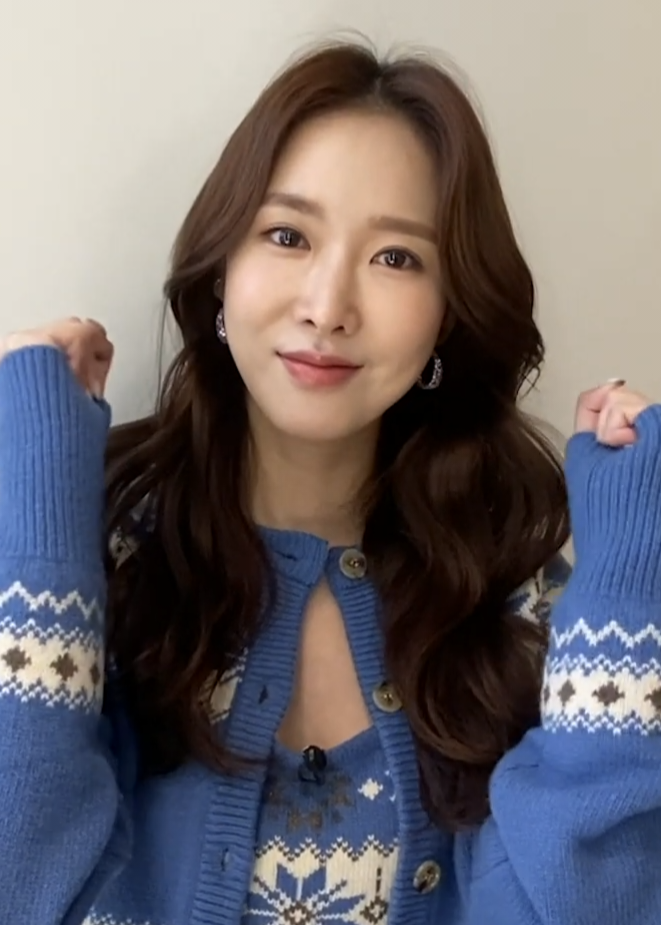
- Cho in December 2020
- Born: June 3, 1991 (age 35); Dong-gu, Gwangju, South Korea
- Other names: Jo Seung-hee; Cho Yi-hyun
- Occupations: Actress; singer; producer
- Years active: 2013–present
- Agent: Wells Entertainment
- Musical career
- Genre: K-pop
- Instrument: Vocals
- Years active: 2013–2016
- Labels: Core Contents; MBK
- Formerly of: F-ve Dolls; DIA

Korean name
- Hangul: 조승희
- Hanja: 曺承希
- RR: Jo Seunghui
- MR: Cho Sŭnghŭi

Stage name
- Hangul: 조이현
- RR: Jo Ihyeon
- MR: Cho Ihyŏn

Cho Seung-hee (Korean: 조승희; born June 3, 1991), better known as Cho Yi-hyun (조이현), is a South Korean actress, singer, general producer of the label company PocketDol Studio and founder of PocketDol Studio's label M25. She debuted as new member of F-ve Dolls in 2013 and continued to promote until the group unofficially disbanded in November 2014, which was confirmed in March 2015. Following the disbandment, she returned as a trainee for almost a year before re-debuting as the leader of DIA in September 2015.

In April 2016, she left DIA after her contract expired to pursue her acting career. She has established herself as an actress with cast in various television dramas such as Mr. Back (2014), Triangle (2014), Diary of a Night Watchman (2014), Sweet Temptation (2015), and The Producers (2015).

== Biography and education ==
Cho Yi-hyun was born Cho Seung-hee on June 3, 1991, in Dong-gu, Gwangju, South Korea. She currently attends Kookmin University. She is the winner of Miss Chunhyang Pageant in 2012.

She auditioned for both Woollim Entertainment and FNC Entertainment and successfully passed the auditions but ended up choosing Woollim Entertainment for training. In 2012, she appeared on Running Man with Lovelyz's Jiae and The SeeYa's Yeonkyung as "Woollim Girls". She later moved to Core Contents Media and debuted as newest member of F-ve Dolls in 2013.

In July 2020, it was announced by her agency, PocketDol Studio, that Cho had changed her stage name to Cho Yi-hyun.

== Career ==
=== 2013–2015: Activities as a member of F-ve Dolls and DIA ===
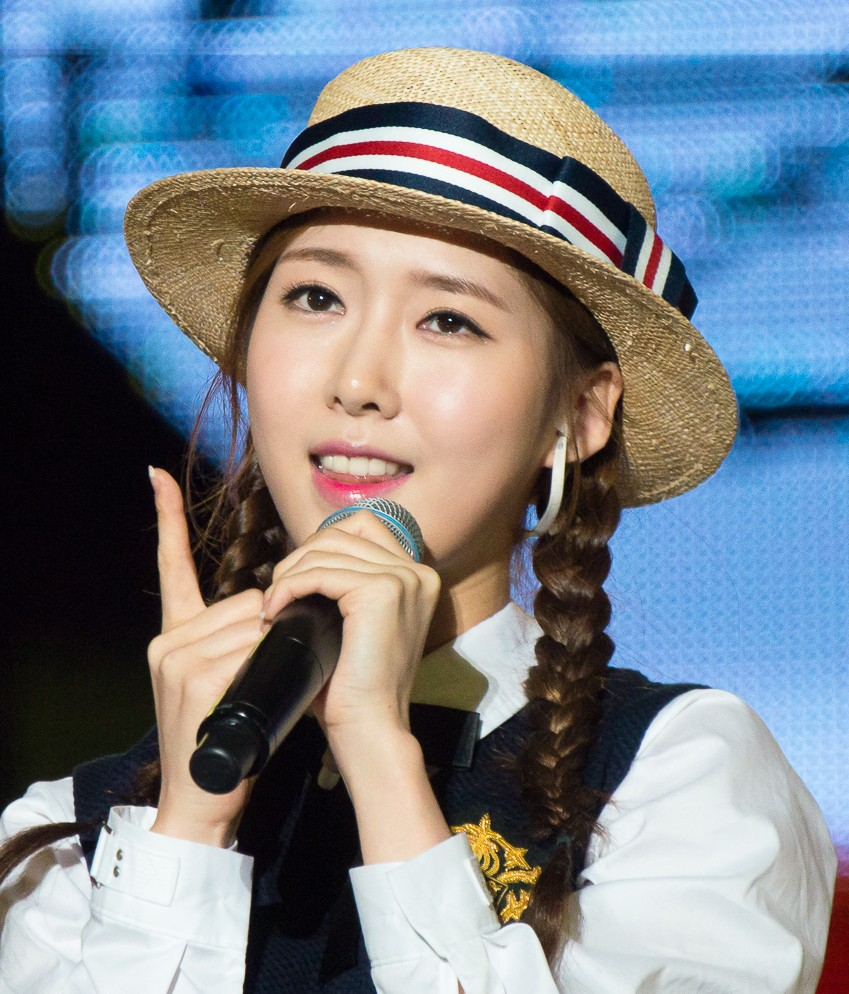
Cho performing in 2013

In July 2013, Cho debuted as the newest member of F-ve Dolls. Aside from her activities group, Cho has acted in several television dramas. Her acting career began in 2014 with a cameo role in Mr. Back and Triangle. She also sang the soundtrack for Triangle titled Kiss and Cry alongside T-ara's Jiyeon and Mighty Mouth's Shorry J. She played a minor role on MBC historical drama Diary of a Night Watchman.

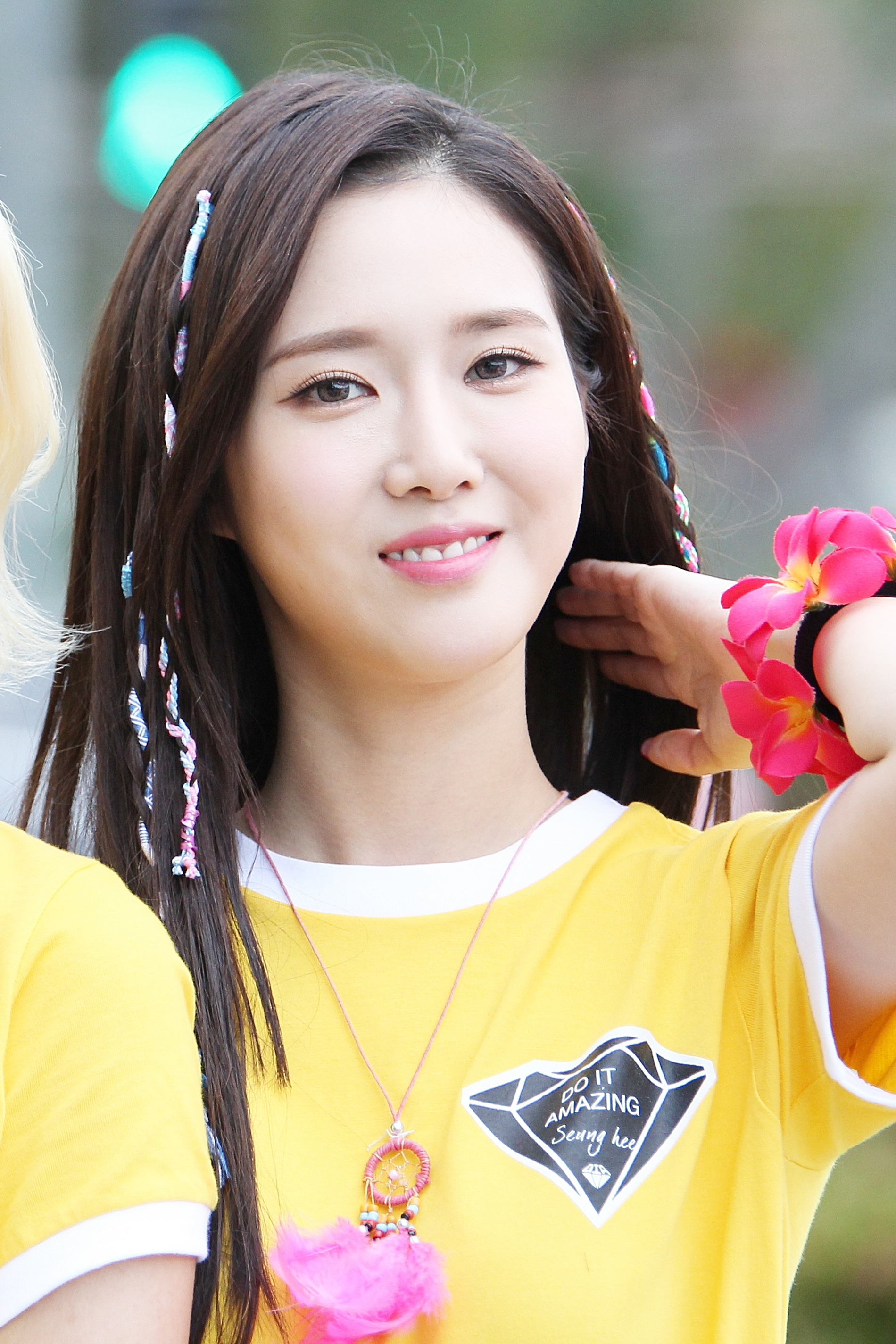
Cho in 2015

In February 2015, Cho joined MBK project group, TS with member of T-ara, The SeeYa and SPEED to release winter single "Don't Forget Me". On March 10, MBK Entertainment announced that F-ve Dolls officially disbanded. Cho is still being managed by MBK Entertainment. On March 16, it was confirmed that she landed a minor role in KBS drama The Producers. On March 18, MBK Entertainment confirmed that Cho would be participating in MBK's upcoming girl group survival show T-ara Little Sister Girl Group. The survival show was later cancelled and MBK Entertainment decided to select the members internally. Cho later was chosen as the last member and leader of the group, which debuted in September 2015. From June 9 to 30, she participated in JTBC's Off to School at Goyang International High School.

=== 2016–present: Acting activities ===
In April 2016, Cho was confirmed to cast in KBS' drama Unusual Family. It was announced that her contract with MBK Entertainment would soon expire on April 30, but she was still in negotiations to possibly renew her contract. Cho confirmed her departure from DIA to pursue her acting career after parting ways with MBK Entertainment. She appeared in the dramas Bravo My Life and My First Love.

== Discography ==
Title	Year	Peak chart positions	Album
Title	Year	KOR Gaon	Album
"Kiss and Cry"	2014	—	Triangle OST
"Don't Forget Me" (with TS)	2015	—	White Snow
"첫눈이 온다구요"	2015	—	Reply 1988 OST
"—" denotes releases that did not chart or were not released in that region.

== Filmography ==
=== Television series ===
Year	Title	Role	Notes
2014	Mr. Back	Herself	Cameo
2014	Triangle	Herself	Cameo
2014	Diary of a Night Watchman	Young-geun	Supporting role
2015	The Producers	Yoo-joo	Supporting role
2015	Sweet Temptation	Herself	Web-drama; Cameo
2016	The Unusual Family	Heo Soon-sim	Supporting role
2017	Wednesday 3:30 PM	Choi Sun-ah	Supporting role
2017	109 Strange Things	Shin Ki-yoon	Web-drama; main role
2017	Bravo My Life	Mi-so	
2018	My First Love	Baek Na-hee	Supporting role
2025	Sooji, Sooji	Jung Soo-ji	Web-drama; main role
2026	Family Register	Han Jung-won	Supporting role
