= Kim Jung-woo =

Kim Jung-woo may refer to:

- Kim Jung-woo (footballer)
- Kim Jung-woo (singer)
