= Lee Soo-mi =

Lee Soo-mi may refer to:

- Lee Soo-mi (actress)
- Lee Seo-an, singer and actress who is also known as Lee Soo-mi
- Lee So-mi, professional golfer
