= Ryu Hyo-young =

South Korean entertainer (born 1993)

- 류효영
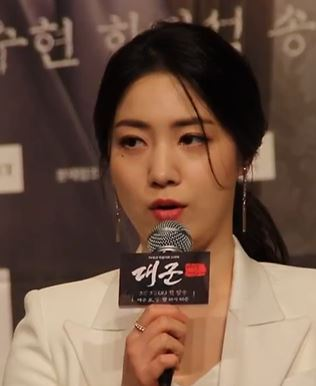
- Ryu in 2018
- Born: Ryu Hyo-young; April 22, 1993 (age 33); Gwangju, South Korea
- Other name: Jung Woo-yeon
- Education: Sungeul High School
- Occupations: Actress; model; rapper
- Years active: 2010–present
- Agent: Big Picture Entertainment
- Relatives: Ryu Hwa-young (twin sister)
- Musical career
- Genres: K-pop; hip hop
- Years active: 2010–2014; 2016–present
- Label: MBK
- Formerly of: Coed School; F-ve Dolls

Korean name
- Hangul: 류효영
- Hanja: 柳孝榮
- RR: Ryu Hyoyeong
- MR: Ryu Hyoyŏng

Stage name
- Hangul: 정우연
- RR: Jeong Uyeon
- MR: Chŏng Uyŏn

Ryu Hyo-young (born April 22, 1993), better known by the mononym Hyoyoung or Jung Woo-yeon, is a South Korean actress, model, and rapper. She was a member of the South Korean co-ed group Coed School and the girl group F-ve Dolls.

== Biography ==
Ryu was born on 22 April 1993 in Gwangju, South Korea. She has twin sister, Ryu Hwa-young, who is a former member of the girl group T-ara. Hyoyoung is the older of the two.

Ryu was scouted after she and her sister made an appearance on SBS' variety show Star King by Core Contents Media. Ryu and her sister were both originally slated to debut in T-ara, however, Ryu was cut from the group's line-up before their debut. A year later, she debuted with Coed School.

== Career ==
=== 2010–15: Debut with Five Dolls and acting debut ===
Ryu made her debut as a member of Coed School in 2010. The group debuted on September 30, 2010. The group was later separated into a female unit and a male unit.

In that same year, Ryu was cast in KBS' teen drama Jungle Fish 2. She also took part in the 80th Miss Chunhyang pageant and subsequently won it.

In 2011, Ryu joined Coed School's female unit, F-ve Dolls. The unit made their debut on February 17. The unit later became an independent group after her agency decided not to reform Coed School. The same year, she starred in MBC's romantic comedy drama The Greatest Love playing a popular singer.

In October 2012, Ryu was cast in KBS' teen drama School 2013. She next starred in weekend drama 12 Years Promise, and the 100-episode daily drama Family Secret.

On March 10, 2015 MBK Entertainment confirmed that F-ve Dolls had decided to disband. In August 2015, following F-ve Dolls' disbandment, it was reported that Ryu had requested to terminate her contract with MBK Entertainment.

=== 2016–present: Acting activities and label change ===
In March 2016, it was confirmed that her request to terminate her contract with MBK Entertainment was accepted. Ryu later signed an exclusive contract with Y Team Company in August 2017. The same year, she was cast as the lead role in MBC's daily drama Golden Pouch.

In 2018, Ryu was cast in the historical TV series Grand Prince. The series achieved a rating of 5.6% for its finale, becoming the highest rated TV Chosun series since the network's establishment in 2011.

She was cast as female lead in weekend series Be Meal under the new stage name Jung Woo-yeon.

As of 2020, she was signed to Big Picture Entertainment.

== Personal life ==
=== Bullying controversy ===
In 2017, a former T-ara staff member stated that Ryu and her sister were the bullies in the scandal that plagued T-ara in 2012. The reports featured a picture of an alleged text conversation between Ryu and Areum, T-ara's member at the time, in which Ryu threatened Areum with comments such as "I'll scratch up your face so you can't be on TV" and "Stupid bitch. Show up in front of me, we'll see what happens." Following this, viewers demanded that Ryu step down from her TV series Golden Pouch.

== Filmography ==
=== Television series ===
Year	Title	Role	Ref.
2010	Jungle Fish 2	Jung Yoo-mi	
2011	The Greatest Love	Harumi	
2012–2013	School 2013	Lee Kang-joo	
2014	12 Years Promise	young Joo Da-hae	
2014–2015	Family Secret	Ko Eun-byeol / Baek Soo-jeong	
2016–2017	Golden Pouch	Geum Seol-hwa	
2018	Grand Prince	Yoon Na-gyeom	
2021	A Good Supper	Young-shin	
2023	Meant To Be	Kang Se-na	
2023	Oh! Youngsim	Gu Wol-sook	

=== Variety show ===
Year	Title	Role	Notes
2014	Hyoyoung's Beauty Vlog	Cast member	

=== Music video appearances ===
Year	Title	Artist	Notes
2012	"Lovey-Dovey" zombie ver.	T-ara	with Coed School
2012	"Lovey-Dovey Plus" ver. 1	SPEED	with Ryu Hwa-young
2012	"Lovey-Dovey Plus" ver. 2	SPEED	
2013	"Turtle"	Davichi	
2016	"Saying with Love"	Im Do-hyuk	

== Awards and nominations ==
Year	Award	Category	Nominated work	Result	Ref.
2010	Miss Chunyang	—N/a	—N/a	Won	
2017	Asia Model Awards	New Rising Star	Golden Pouch	Won	
2017	2017 MBC Drama Awards	Best New Actress	Golden Pouch	Nominated	
2021	2021 MBC Drama Awards	Top Excellence Award, Actress in a Daily Drama	A Good Supper	Nominated	
