= Wuno =

South Korean musician (born 1990)

₩uNo
- Born: Woo Ji-seok; May 11, 1990 (age 35); Mapo, Seoul, South Korea
- Other name: Woo Tae-woon
- Occupations: Rapper; singer; songwriter; record producer
- Family: Zico (brother)
- Musical career
- Genres: Hip hop
- Years active: 2010–present
- Labels: MBK / Core Contents Media; MillionMarket
- Formerly of: Coed School; Speed; Royal Class

Korean name
- Hangul: 우태운
- Hanja: 禹泰雲
- RR: U Taeun
- MR: U T'aeun

Birth name
- Hangul: 우지석
- RR: U Jiseok
- MR: U Chisŏk

Alternate name
- Hangul: 우노
- RR: Uno
- MR: Uno

Woo Ji-seok (Korean: 우지석; born May 11, 1990), commonly known by his stage name Taewoon or ₩uNo is a South Korean rapper, singer, songwriter and record producer. He is a former member of the boy band Speed and pop group Coed School.

== Biography ==
Woo Ji-seok was born on May 11, 1990, in Mapo, Seoul, South Korea. Woo lived in Japan for three years and studied at the Tokyo Polytechnic University for Industrial Art. He alongside his younger brother Zico were both trainees under Stardom Entertainment and trained for Block B, but he left the line-up before debuting and later joined Core Contents Media (Later known as MBK Entertainment).

== Career ==
=== Coed School (2010) ===
On September 30, 2010, Woo made his debut as a member of Coed School with the release of their digital single "Too Late", followed by their second digital single "Bbiribbom Bberibbom" three weeks later. The group then released their mini-album "Something That Is Cheerful And Fresh" a month after their official debut. Due to various scandals with some of the male members in late 2010, MBK Entertainment decided to debut a female sub-unit F-ve Dolls in February 2011, consisting of the group female members, and a new member Eunkyo. A year after, in February 2012, the male members debuted in the male sub-unit Speed. A representative of MBK Entertainment revealed in the middle of 2013 that they had no plans for Coed School to reform again, as both of its sub-units had grown and changed their line-ups to become independent groups.

=== Speed (2012 to 2015) ===
Speed first released their male cover of T-ara's single "Lovey Dovey", which they titled "Lovey Dovey Plus". Woo then became the leader of Coed School's subgroup Speed.

They made their official debut on January 17, 2013, with the song "It's Over", an electronic dance song. The 15-minute drama music video for their debut track is based on the Gwangju Uprising and features actors such as Park Bo-young, Ji Chang-wook, Ha Seok-jin and A Pink's Naeun.

In October 2013, Woo and Sejoon (of Speed) went to Los Angeles to meet with Ray J and other rappers in order to record a new song and music video.

In March 2015, Woo withdrew from the group for pursue solo career while MBK still managed him.

=== Solo activities ===
In December 2012, Woo released a solo track called "Saturday Night".

Woo also has a rap group called "Royal Class", including himself, Roydo, Chancey The Glow, Sims of M.I.B, Konquest, KittiB and Mino from Winner.

In 2015, Woo participated in the Mnet program Show Me The Money 4.

In 2017, he joined Mix Nine. He placed 20th for the males, failing to enter the top 9 who were later chosen as the winning team to debut.

=== Producer work ===
In February 2014, Speed released a comeback album produced by Woo, Speed Circus, as well as the music videos "Why I'm Not" and "Don't Tease Me". In the same month, Taewoon released another solo track entitled "Focus".

In early 2015, Woo signed to MillionMarket and using name ₩uNo as music producer.

== Discography ==
Year	Song	Album	Note
2012	"Be With You"	Good To Seeya	With The SeeYa
2013	"Jeon Won Diary"	Jeon Won Diary (T-ara N4 EP)	With T-ara N4
2013	"Painkiller"	Tears of Mind	With Choi Sungmin, F-ve Dolls's Seo Eunkyo, The SeeYa's Sung Yoojin and T-ara's Soyeon
2014	"Focus"	Speed Circus	Solo
2016	"Copy Ma Lyrics" (내꺼 빼껴)	내꺼 빼껴	Featuring Nafla
2016	"Fine Apple"	"Fine Apple"	Featuring Kriz
2021	"Vaccine"	"Vaccine"	With IONE Featuring Apink's Yoon Bo-mi
2021	"You Know"	"You Know"	With IONE
2022	"Loved"	"Loved"	With IONE

=== Mixtape ===
Year	Song	Album	Remarks
2011	Dear Fan		
2012	Saturday Night		
2014	Walkin' On Ma Way		Royal Class
2014	I've Got A Wing		
2014	Blind		
2014	Zico's Hyung		
2014	Hooted		Royal Class
2014	5AM	Doin' A Free Fall	
2014	If God Had Tired	Doin' A Free Fall	
2014	In Order	Doin' A Free Fall	Feat. Dorothy
2014	Fall	Doin' A Free Fall	
2014	This F*cker	Doin' A Free Fall	Royal Class
2014	Lost Star	Doin' A Free Fall	

=== Songwriting Credits ===
Year	Song	Artist	Album	Label	Lyrics		Music	
Year	Song	Artist	Album	Label	Credited	With	Credited	With
2014	Why I'm Not?	Speed	Speed Circus	Core Contents Media	Yes	Radio Galaxi	Yes	Radio Galaxi
2014	Don't Tease Me! (Original Ver. & Vocal Ver.)	Speed	Speed Circus	Core Contents Media	Yes	-	Yes	IAM
2014	Hey Ma Lady	Speed	Speed Circus	Core Contents Media	Yes	-	Yes	Radio Galaxi
2014	Focus	Taewoon	Speed Circus	Core Contents Media	Yes	-	No	-
2014	Zombie Party	Speed	Speed Circus	Core Contents Media	Yes	-	Yes	Radio Galaxi
2015	Ring My Bell	Girl's Day	Love	Dream T Entertainment	Yes	Long Candy	No	-
2015	Cushion	Sonamoo	Cushion	TS Entertainment	Yes	EastWest	Yes	EastWest
2015	Where You At	JJCC	ACK MONG	Jackie Chan Group Korea	Yes	Duble Sidekick, Long Candy, David Kim	No	-
2015	Trauma	JJCC	ACK MONG	Jackie Chan Group Korea	Yes	Radio Galaxi, David Kim	No	-
2015	Insomnia (Original Ver., Rap Ver. & Ver. 2)	JJCC	ACK MONG	Jackie Chan Group Korea	Yes	Duble Sidekick, Radio Galaxi	No	-
2015	PIPPI	2EYES	—N/a	Sidus HQ	Yes	Long Candy	No	-
2016	ToDay	JJCC	—N/a	Jackie Chan Group Korea	Yes	Duble Sidekick	No	-
2016	Love is You	MAP6	Swagger Time	Dream T Entertainment	Yes	Duble Sidekick, Long Candy	No	-
2016	Uh-Gi-Yeo-Cha	MOMOLAND	Welcome to MOMOLAND	Dublekick Company	Yes	Duble Sidekick, Yanggaeng	Yes	Duble Sidekick, Yanggaeng
2020	I Know But	Classy	N/A	Independent	Yes	Classy	No	-
2021	Love Drug	Leebada	N/A	NUPLAY	Yes	Lee Ba Da, Lee Won Woo, Jang Heewon,	No	-
2021	Thank You	Apink	N/A	Play M Entertainment	Yes	Duble Sidekick, Yoon Bo Mi	Yes	Duble Sidekick, De view

== Filmography ==
=== Television dramas ===
Year	Title	Role	Remarks
2011	Listen to My Heart	Businessman	

=== Variety shows ===
Year	Title	Network	Role	Note
2015	Show Me the Money 4	Mnet	Contestant	
2016	Show Me the Money 5	Mnet	Contestant	
2017	Mix Nine	JTBC	Contestant	
2021	King of Mask Singer	MBC	Contestant	as "Winter Rain" (episode 289)
