= Huh Chan-mi =

South Korean singer (born 1992)

- 허찬미
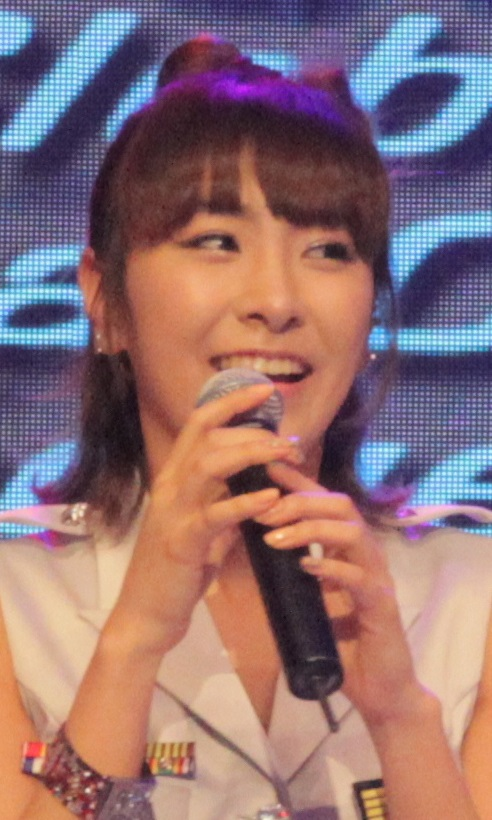
- Huh appearing at a press event in 2011 as part of F-ve Dolls.
- Born: Huh Chan-mi; April 6, 1992 (age 33); Namyangju, South Korea
- Occupation: Singer
- Years active: 2010–present
- Musical career
- Genres: K-pop
- Instrument: Vocals
- Labels: Core Contents Media; Duble Kick; Mostable; FirstOne
- Formerly of: Coed School; F-ve Dolls

Korean name
- Hangul: 허찬미
- Hanja: 許讚美
- RR: Heo Chanmi
- MR: Hŏ Ch'anmi

Huh Chan-mi (Korean: 허찬미; born April 6, 1992), also known mononymously as Chanmi, is a South Korean singer. Chanmi made her debut in 2010 as a member of a South Korean co-ed group Coed School and its female unit F-ve Dolls from 2011 until her departure from the group in February 2012. Chanmi briefly returned to training and appeared on the survival shows Produce 101 (2016) and Mix Nine (2017). Chanmi later signed FirstOne Entertainment in 2020 prior to release her debut solo single album, Highlight, later that year.

== Life and career ==
=== 1992–2012: Early life and career beginnings ===
Huh was born on April 6, 1992, in Namyangju, South Korea.

Chanmi became a trainee in S.M. Entertainment in 2004. She initially trained to become a tenth member of Girls' Generation, however due to the limited-nine member line-up she did not make the final cut of the group because she was too young, and only in seventh grade. She went to Anyang School of Arts and graduated in 2011.

After leaving SM Entertainment, Chanmi signed with Core Contents Media and made her official debut in 2010 as vocalist of the group Coed School. The group debuted with a single "Too Late". By mid 2011, Coed School split into two sub units: Speed and F-ve Dolls. Huh was part of the latter, along with the remaining three female Coed School members and a new member Eunkyo. The group released two promotional videos for singles "Lip Stains" and "Your Words" in which Huh was the protagonist along with bandmate Lee Soomi and singer Jay Park. F-ve Dolls released one more single titled "Like This Or That" before Huh's departure from the group and Core Contents Media in 2012. At the time, Huh wrote on Twitter that she was in the process of looking for another agency.

=== 2013–2018: Further training, Produce 101 and Mix Nine ===
Huh joined Pledis Entertainment as a trainee for a brief period of time in 2013. She performed in one of the Like Seventeen concert shows on Seventeen TV along with other Pledis trainees. Shortly after, she left the company and joined Duble Kick Entertainment. In 2016, Huh joined the Mnet survival show Produce 101 to compete against 101 other female K-pop trainees. She placed in the "A" category after her first evaluation and made it into the final 35 contestants, thus being able to record a song for release.

In 2016, Duble Kick's own survival show "Finding Momoland" began airing on Mnet, to form a new girl group called Momoland. Huh did not take part in the show as she was to debut in a different girlgroup. In November, Huh featured on MC Mong's album U.F.O on the album track "And You". The song also featured singer New-a, Huh's future bandmate in the girlgroup High Color from Mostable Music. The four-member group joined YG Entertainment's survival show Mix Nine where she recorded a song produced by MC Mong titled "Like a Star". Huh was eliminated from Mix Nine in the 13th episode with her final rank being 20th place. Soon after the show ended, Huh left High Color and did not make any public appearances in 2018.

In February 2019, Huh graduated from Dongduk Women's University after seven years, majoring in practical music.

=== 2020–present: Solo debut ===
In January 2020, Huh signed a contract with FirstOne Entertainment and started a personal YouTube channel, under her new romanized stage name Huh Chan Mi. Her first video was a cover of "Señorita" by Camila Cabello and Shawn Mendes, which was popular in South Korea. In June, it was announced that Huh was preparing to release an album the following month. Huh released the self-composed song, "I'm fine thanks", along with a performance trailer on July 9, as a pre-release before her solo album. The song was reported to be about how Huh had to overcome difficulties and grow in the entertainment industry while hiding her unhappiness. Huh released her solo album Highlight on July 23 along with first single "Lights". In December 2020, Huh confirmed to participate in the second season of Miss Trot, a trot survival show.

In February 2023, Huh announced through her SNS account that her contract with FirstOne had expired.

== Discography ==
=== Single albums ===
- Highlight (2020)
- Chanmi's Trot: Haeundae Beach (2021)

=== Singles ===
Title	Year	Peak chart positions	Album
Title	Year	KOR	Album
"I'm fine thanks"	2020	—	Highlight
"Lights"	2020	—	Highlight
"Haeundae Beach" (해운대 밤바다)	2021	—	Chanmi's Trot: Haeundae Beach
"—" denotes releases that did not chart or were not released in that region.

=== Featured artist ===
Title	Year	Peak chart positions	Album
Title	Year	KOR	Album
"And You" (MC Mong featuring Chanmi, New-a of Highcolor)	2016	—	U.F.O
"—" denotes releases that did not chart or were not released in that region.

=== Compilation appearances ===
Title	Year	Peak chart positions	Album
Title	Year	KOR	Album
"Yum-Yum" (얌얌) as 7 go up	2016	9	PRODUCE 101: 35 Girls 5 Concepts
"Like a Star" (이 밤이 지니면) as Excellent Vibe	2018	—	MIXNINE Part.4
"Father's Youth" (아빠의 청춘)	2020	—	Miss Trot 2 Preliminary Best PART2
"An Odious Man" (미운 사내) as Idol Team (Feel Good)	2021	—	Miss Trot 2 Team Mission BEST
"Still a Dark Night" (아직도 어두운 밤인가봐)	2021	—	Miss Trot 2 Death Match PART2
"Danger" (일나겠네) as Awesome	2021	—	Miss Trot 2 Medley Team Mission Group
"Acacia" (아카시아) as Awesome	2021	—	Miss Trot 2 Medley Team Mission Group
"Parallel" (평행선) as Awesome	2021	—	Miss Trot 2 Medley Team Mission Group
"Empty Glass" (빈잔) as Awesome	2021	—	Miss Trot 2 Medley Team Mission Group
"Lingering Affection" (미련)	2021	—	Miss Trot 2 Legend Mission Best Semi-Final 2
"The Rope of Love" (사랑의 밧줄) with Maria	2021	—	Miss Trot 2 Legend Mission Best Semi-Final 2
"It's a Wonderful Life" (멋진인생) as Miss Rainbow	2021	—	Miss Trot 2 Final Song of Life Mission
"Magic Girl" (마법소녀) with Kang Hye-yeon and Hwang Woo-lim	2021	—	Let's Be My Daughter PART3
"—" denotes releases that did not chart or were not released in that region.

== Filmography ==
=== Television ===
Year	Title	Notes	Network
2011	M Countdown	Host	Mnet
2016	Produce 101	Participant	Mnet
2017	Mix Nine	Participant	JTBC
