= MBK Entertainment =

South Korean company

- Native name: MBK 엔터테인먼트
- Formerly: GM Planning (1999–2007); Core Contents Media (2007–2014)
- Traded as: Unlisted company
- Industry: Music; Entertainment
- Genre: K-pop; R&B; nu-disco
- Founded: January 9, 2007 (Core Contents Media); October 14, 2014 (MBK Entertainment)
- Founder: Kim Kwang-soo
- Defunct: 2022
- Fate: Most of the music catalogs were sold to Beyond Music, while the publishing rights were held by Dreamus.
- Headquarters: Yeoksam, Gangnam, Seoul, South Korea
- Key people: Kim Tae-kyung (CEO)
- Services: Music production; Licensing; Record distribution; Artists Management
- Parent: CJ E&M Music (2006–2009); MBK (2014–2016)
- Subsidiaries: DAP Sound (2014); PocketDol Studio (2017); M25 (2022)

MBK Entertainment (Korean: MBK 엔터테인먼트) was a South Korean entertainment company established by Kim Kwang-soo. MBK Entertainment is known for managing multiple successful K-pop artists, such as T-ara, DIA, Davichi, SeeYa, F-ve Dolls, Shannon, Coed School, and SPEED.

The company was originally founded in 1999 as GM Planning. The company was absorbed by Mnet Media in 2006, following Kim Kwang-soo joint with CJ Group as their director. In 2007, the company re-launch as Core Contents Media under Mnet Media. In September 2009, Kim Kwang-soo was removed from the list as director of Mnet Media and then effectively his own company ended business with Mnet Media.

On October 1, 2014, Core Contents Media had been acquired by MBK Co., Ltd. (formerly CS ELSOLAR Co., Ltd.) and renamed as MBK Entertainment (abbreviation for "Music Beyond Korea").

In December 2016, MBK Entertainment parent company MBK suspended their entertainment business.

In May 2018, Kim Kwang-soo and its subsidiary label The Unit: Idol Rebooting Project Culture Industry Company (then-known as PocketDol Studio) were revealed to have a secret partnership with PD Han Kyeong-cheon to produce survival program The Unit: Idol Rebooting Project. He also confirmed that he would be focused as producer for winning group UNB and UNI.T.

In October 2018, MBK and MBC launched a talent show titled Under Nineteen, a contest for male trainees under the age of 19 years old to compete for a spot to be in a new K-pop idol group 1the9. The final winners would sign a 12-month contract under MBK (then PocketDol Studio) after a 5-month contract with MBC.

In April 2020, two contestants representing MBK in Produce X 101, Hangyul and Dohyon debuted as duo H&D under PocketDol Studio. In May 2020, DIA were transferred to sub-label PocketDol Studio ahead of their June comeback.

As of 2022, the company became defunct and closed after moving to its subsidiary label PocketDol Studio.

== Former artists ==
- SG Wannabe (2006–2009)
- SeeYa ^{1} (2009–2011)
  - Kim Yeon-ji (2009–2011)
  - Lee Bo-ram (2009–2016)
- Black Pearl (2007–2012)
- Yangpa (2007–2012)
- Supernova ^{17} (2007–2012)
- Coed School ^{8} (2010–2013)
  - Kangho ^{3} (2010–2011)
- Davichi (2008–2014)
- Hong Jin-young (2009–2014)
- Gangkiz ^{10} (2012–2014)
  - Hwang Ji-hyun (2012–2013)
  - Kwak So-min (2012–2013)
  - Jo Eun-byul (2012–2013)
- F-ve Dolls ^{11} (2011–2015)
  - Lee Soo-mi ^{4} (2009–2012)
  - Huh Chan-mi ^{5} (2010–2012)
  - Seo Eun-kyo (2011–2015)
  - Oh Yeon-kyung (2013–2015)
  - Han Na-yeon (2013–2015)
  - Jin Hye-won (2010–2015)
  - Ryu Hyo-young (2010–2016)
- Koh Na-young (2015)
- Kwang Toh (2014–2015)
- SPEED ^{14} (2012–2015)
  - Kwangheng ^{7} (2010–2012)
  - Noori ^{7} (2010–2012)
  - Taewoon ^{13} (2010–2015)
  - Taeha (2012–2016)
  - Jongkook (2012–2016)
  - Sungmin (2010–2016)
  - Jungwoo (2010–2016)
- The SeeYa ^{14} (2012–2015)
- HighBrow (2015–2016)
- T-ara (2009–2017)
  - Hwayoung ^{6} (2010–2012)
  - Areum ^{9} (2012–2014)
  - Boram (2009–2017)
  - Soyeon (2009–2017)
  - Qri (2009–2017)
  - Eunjung (2009–2017)
  - Hyomin (2009–2017)
  - Jiyeon (2009–2017)
- Nutaz (2014–2017)
- Shannon (2011–2019)
- Kim Dani (2012–2019)
- DIA (2015–2020)
  - Cho Seung-hee ^{15} (2013–2016)
  - Eunjin ^{16} (2015–2018)
  - Jenny (2015–2019)
  - Somyi (2017–2022)
  - Lee Ju-eun (2017–2022)
  - Yebin (2015–2022)
  - Ki Hui-hyeon (2015–2022)
  - Eunice (2015–2022)
  - Eunchae (2016–2022)
  - Jung Chae-yeon (2015–2022)

Former actors

- No Min-woo (2009–2012)
- Nam Gyu-ri ^{2} (2006–2014)
- Ha Seok-jin (20??–2015)
- Choi Soo-eun ^{10} (2012–2015)
- Lee Hae-in ^{10} (2012–2016)
- Kim Gyu-ri (2014–2016)
- Son Ho-jun (20??–2016)
- Baek Da-eun (2016)
- Kim Ga-hwa ^{10} (2012–2017)
- Kim Min-chae (2014–2017)
- Yoon So-ra (2014–2017)
- Kim Min-hyung (2014–2017)
- Jun Jae-hyun ^{10} (2012–2017)
- Moon Hee-kyung (2015–2017)
- Park Se-jun (2016–2018)
- Park Sang-won (20??–2019)
- Kim Yu-hwan (2012–2019)

Note

- ^{1}After Seeya disbanded in 2011, Kim Yeon-ji left from MBK Entertainment. Lee Boram remained until parting ways with MBK Entertainment in 2016.
- ^{2}Nam Gyu-ri debuted in 2006 as a member of Seeya. She left the group in 2009 and remained with MBK to pursue her acting career. In 2014, she officially parted ways with MBK Entertainment.
- ^{3}Kangho debuted as a member of Coed School in 2010. He left the group in 2011.
- ^{4}Lee Soomi debuted as a new member of Seeya in 2009. She left from the group to re-debut as a member of Coed School in 2010, and joined the female unit F-ve Dolls in 2011. In 2012, she parted ways with MBK Entertainment.
- ^{5}Heo Chanmi debuted as a member of Coed School in 2010 and joined the female unit F-ve Dolls in 2011. She left the group and MBK in 2012.
- ^{6}Ryu Hwayoung debuted as a new member of T-ara in 2010. She left from the group in 2012 after MBK Entertainment terminated her contract.
- ^{7}Kwangheng and Noori debuted as a member of Coed School in 2010 and joined the male unit Speed in 2012. They later left the group in late 2012.
- ^{8}Coed School was formed in 2010. The group was later separated into units: F-ve Dolls in 2011 and Speed in 2012. MBK had no plans to reform the coed group, and Coed School disbanded in 2013 when the units became independent groups.
- ^{9}Areum debuted as a new member of T-ara in 2012. She left the group in 2013 to pursue her solo career and later parted ways with MBK Entertainment.
- ^{10}Gangkiz were formed in 2012. Hwang Jihyun, Choi Sooeun, Lee Haein, Kwak Somin and Cho Eunbyul left the group in April 2013 and only Hyeji and Esther remained until the group officially disbanded in 2014. Lee Haein, Choi Sooeun, Hyeji (Kim Gahwa) and Esther (Jun Jaehyun) remained under MBK as actresses. Choi parted ways in 2015 with MBK Entertainment following Lee in 2016, Kim and Jun in 2017.
- ^{11}F-ve Dolls originally debuted as members of Coed School. The unit was formed in 2011 as the female unit of Coed School and became an independent group in 2013. The group was reported to have disbanded after their page was deleted from the agency website in late 2014. In March 2015, MBK Entertainment confirmed that the group was officially disbanded. Ryu Hyoyoung filed a lawsuit against the agency to terminate her contract and succeeded in 2016.
- ^{12}Taewoon debuted as a member of Coed School in 2010 and joined the male unit Speed in 2012. He left the group and the agency in 2015 to pursue his solo career.
- ^{13}Speed originally debuted as member of Coed School. The unit was formed in 2012 as the male unit of Coed School. In 2013, the unit became an independent group after MBK Entertainment chose not to reform Coed School as a group. The group was reported to have disbanded after their page was deleted from the agency website in late-2015, but the agency never officially confirmed this. The group's members, excepting Park Se-jun and Kim Yu-hwan, parted ways with MBK Entertainment in 2016.
- ^{14}The SeeYa were formed in 2012. In late 2015, the group's page had been deleted from the agency website and it was speculated that the group was disbanded, but MBK Entertainment never made an official statement
- ^{15}Cho Seunghee debuted as a new member of F-ve Dolls in 2013 and the group officially disbanded in March 2015. In September 2015, Seunghee re-debuted as a member of MBK girl group DIA and left the group after her contract expired with the agency.
- ^{16}Eunjin officially left DIA due to health problems on May 7, 2018.
- ^{17}Supernova was part of Core Contents but stayed with Maroo Entertainment.

== Filmography ==
- Death Bell (2008)
- Cinderella Man (2009)
- Death Bell 2: Bloody Camp (2010)
- Sweet Temptation (2015)
- The Unit: Idol Rebooting Project (2017–2018)
- Under Nineteen (2018–2019)
- Miss Trot (2019)
- Produce X101 (2019)
- Mr Trot (2020)
- My Teenage Girl (2021-2022)
