= 12 Years Promise =

South Korean television series

- Promotional poster
- Also known as: Jang Gook Becomes Dal-rae: Reunion in 12 Years; Wild Chives and Tofu Soup; Wild Chive Soybean Paste Soup, Soothed Clear Soup
- Hangul: 달래 된, 장국: 12년만의 재회
- RR: Dallae doen, jangguk: 12nyeonmanui jaehoe
- MR: Tallae toen, changguk: 12nyŏnmanŭi chaehoe
- Genre: Romantic comedy; Family
- Written by: Kim Yi-kyung
- Directed by: Kim Do-hyung; Yoon Jae-won
- Starring: Lee So-yeon; Namkoong Min; Lee Tae-im; Yoon So-hee; Lee Won-keun; Ryu Hyo-young
- Country of origin: South Korea
- Original language: Korean
- No. of episodes: 26

Production
- Executive producer: Jo Joon-hyung
- Producer: Go Jung-ho
- Production company: Drama House

Original release
- Network: JTBC; OBS TV (2018)
- Release: March 22 – June 29, 2014

12 Years Promise (Korean: 달래 된, 장국: 12년만의 재회; lit. 'Wild Chives and Soy Bean Soup: 12 Years Reunion') is a 2014 South Korean television series starring Lee So-yeon, Namkoong Min, Lee Tae-im, Yoon So-hee, Lee Won-keun and Ryu Hyo-young. It aired on JTBC from March 22 to June 29, 2014, on Saturdays and Sundays at 20:45 (KST) for 26 episodes.

The native title is a pun, and can also mean Jang Guk Becomes Dal-rae: Reunion in 12 Years. The female protagonist's name, Jang Guk, means "clear soup with doenjang", and she later changes it to Dal-rae, meaning "azalea".

== Synopsis ==
In 2002, on the night of Korea's momentous World Cup win, high school sweethearts Jang Guk (Lee So-yeon) and Yu Jun-su (Namkoong Min) sleep together and Jang Guk ends up pregnant. They are given permission to marry by Jun-su's father, but after a horrible accident, Jang Guk loses the baby. Their mothers who were against the relationship from the beginning, take advantage of the situation and split them up. Jang Guk then leaves Korea to live in the U.S. and changes her name to Jang Dal-lae. Twelve years later, they reunite and get entangled in each other's lives again. The only problem is that Yu Jun-su doesn't know it's her and Jang Guk doesn't want him to know.

== Cast ==
=== Main ===
- Lee So-yeon as Jang Guk / Jang Dal-rae
  - Yoon So-hee as young Jang Guk

Guk is a high school senior at the start of the story. She is a good student who has achieved the highest ranking in her classes. After losing her father in a tragic accident, she moves from Busan to Seoul with her mother and younger brother, Hoon. She meets and begins a relationship with her classmate Yu Jun-su and after a fateful night she ends up pregnant with his child.

- Namkoong Min as Yu Jun-su
  - Lee Won-keun as young Yu Jun-su

Jun-su is a high school senior at Daehan High School. He is handsome, friendly, and a good student. His father is the vice principal of the school. His family owns the building in which Jang Guk's family operates a dumpling restaurant. Over the course of twelve years, Jun-su goes from the son of a prominent wealthy household to struggling as the eldest provider for a family that scrapes by from paycheck to paycheck. Prideful and temperamental, he seems tough on the outside but is vulnerable underneath it all.

- Lee Tae-im as Ju Da-hae
  - Ryu Hyo-young as young Ju Da-hae

Da-hae is an ace student who received the highest math score in all of Korea. She is humiliated when her father's adultery becomes public knowledge. Da-hae has been friends with Jun-su since childhood, and is in love with him. When Jun-su rejects Da-hae to date Guk, she is devastated.

=== Supporting ===
==== Jang Guk / Dal-rae's family ====
- Bae Jong-ok as Choi Go-soon
- Oh Seung-yoon as Jang Hoon
  - Ra Yoon-chan as young Jang Hoon
- Seo Woo-rim as Yeo Il-sook
- Kim Young-ran as Yeo Sam-sook
- Um Hyo-sup as Jang Guk's father

==== Yu Jun-su's family ====
- Park Hae-mi as Pyung Beom-sook
- Chun Ho-jin as Yu Jeong-han
- Kim Si-hoo as Yu Jun-seong
  - Choi Won-hong as young Yu Jun-seong
- Danny Ahn as Yu Su-han
- Jung Kyung-soon as Yu Jeong-suk

==== Ju Da-hae's family ====
- Ji Soo-won as Kim Yeong-hui
- Lee Han-wi as Joo Chul-soo
- Nhã Phương as Ha-mi
- Choi Ro-woon as Ju Hong

=== Extended ===
- Jung Chan as Heo Se-min
- Jung In-sun as Kang Ham-cho
  - Lee Young-eun as young Kang Ham-cho
- Lee Yong-joo as Park Mu-cheol, childhood friend of Jun-su
  - Han Min as young Park Mu-cheol
- Ah Young as Park Mu-hui
  - Lee Do-yeon as young Park Mu-hui
- Shin Dong-mi as Yeo-ok
- Jung Kyu-soo as Mr. Kang

== Ratings ==
Episode	Original broadcast date	Average audience share (Nielsen Korea)
1	March 22, 2014	1.5%
2	March 23, 2014	1.4%
3	March 29, 2014	1.6%
4	March 30, 2014	1.7%
5	April 5, 2014	1.2%
6	April 6, 2014	1.3%
7	April 12, 2014	0.9%
8	April 13, 2014	1.2%
9	May 3, 2014	0.7%
10	May 4, 2014	0.8%
11	May 10, 2014	0.7%
12	May 11, 2014	1.0%
13	May 17, 2014	0.7%
14	May 18, 2014	1.2%
15	May 24, 2014	0.6%
16	May 25, 2014	0.8%
17	May 31, 2014	0.8%
18	June 1, 2014	1.1%
19	June 7, 2014	0.7%
20	June 8, 2014	1.0%
21	June 14, 2014	0.7%
22	June 15, 2014	0.8%
23	June 21, 2014	0.7%
24	June 22, 2014	1.0%
25	June 28, 2014	0.7%
26	June 29, 2014	0.9%
Average		0.9%

- In this table, the blue numbers represent the lowest ratings and the red numbers represent the highest ratings.
- Cable/Pay TV usually have a relatively smaller audience compared to free-to-air TV/public broadcasters (KBS, SBS, MBC and EBS).

== International broadcast ==
Country	Network	Airing dates
Taiwan	ELTA TV (愛爾達電視)	August 5, 2016 – September 9, 2016 (Monday to Friday 21:00 – 22:30)
Thailand	PPTV HD	May 28, 2016 – August 13, 2016 (every Saturday and Sunday 09:00 – 10:25)
Thailand	MCOT HD	April 9, 2018 – May 14, 2018 (every Monday to Friday 23:05 – 23:58)
Indonesia	MYTV	Unknown
