= Speed (South Korean band) =

South Korean boy band

- Origin: Seoul, South Korea
- Genres: K-pop; Dance-pop; Hip hop
- Years active: 2012–2015
- Labels: MBK Entertainment; GM Contents Media
- Spinoff of: Coed School (2012–2013) (Note: Coed School disbanded in 2013, resulting in Speed becoming an independent group.)
- Past members: Noori; Kwang Haeng; Taewoon; Jungwoo; Sejun; Taeha; Sungmin; Yuhwan; Jongkook; KI-O

Speed (Korean: 스피드; commonly stylized as SPEED) was a South Korean boy band formed by MBK Entertainment (formerly known as Core Contents Media) in 2012. The group was formerly Coed School's male unit until they became an independent group in 2013. In late 2015, MBK Entertainment removed their profile page from the official website and it was reported that the group was disbanded.

== History ==
=== 2011–2012: Formation and debut ===
In 2011, Core Contents Media announced that they would be dividing Co-Ed School into two sub-units. The first unit consisted of the original five Co-Ed School female members and one new member; together they would form 5Dolls (commonly stylized as F-ve Dolls). They debuted in 2011.

The second unit consisted of the original Co-Ed School male members Kangho, Kwanghaeng, Jungwoo, Taewoon, Noori and Sungmin.

On November 4, 2011, it was announced that member Kangho had withdrawn from the group to focus on an acting career. Core Contents Media also announced Superstar K3 contestant Shin Jongkook would replace Kangho.

In January 2012, Core Contents Media revealed the second sub-unit's name would be Speed (commonly stylized as SPEED). The group released a single album, Hommage to Lovely-Dovey, with the title track "Lovey Dovey-Plus" on February 14. The song was a remake of T-ara's hit "Lovey Dovey". The music video featured Ryu Hwayoung and Ryu Hyoyoung. On February 14, Speed made their first live performance with the song "Lovey Dovey-Plus" on Music Bank. Sejun was added to the unit a few days later.

In early 2012, Core Contents Media moved Co-Ed School and its sub-units to their subsidiary label GM Contents Media. Near the end of 2012, the group was moved back to the main label Core Contents Media, along with F-ve Dolls.

Members Kwanghaeng and Noori left the group in September, and were replaced by Yuhwan and Taeha in October.

=== 2013: Superior Speed ===
In late December 2012, Core Contents Media announced that Speed would release an album entitled Superior SPEED.

The group pre-released a single album, Speed of Light, with title track "Sad Promise" on January 7 along with two music videos to the song, a dance version and a drama version. The dance version starred Davichi's Kang Minkyung, and the drama version starred Park Bo-young, A Pink's Naeun, Ji Chang-wook, and Ha Seok-jin.

On January 15, Speed released their debut album, Superior SPEED, and its title track "It's Over". "It's Over" also got both a dance version music video and a drama version music video. The song was produced by Shinsadong Tiger.

On February 20, Speed made a comeback with a repackage of their debut album entitled Blow Speed, with the title track "Pain the Love of Heart", also known as just "Pain".

In mid-2013, Core Contents Media stated in an interview that they had no plans for Co-Ed School to reform again as both of the sub-units had grown and changed their line-ups to become independent groups.

=== 2014: Mini concert and Speed Circus ===
Speed held a showcase in Mongolia. From February 3–7, 2014, they performed at UNIQOL AX Hall to promote the release of their upcoming mini-album 'Speed Circus'. The group performed six songs, and had three guest-stars. Shannon and Dani sang two songs during the intermission and F-ve Dolls's Hyewon danced with SPEED during their song 'Hey Ma Lady'. The showcase aired on February 17 on SBS MTV.

Speed first mini album Speed Circus was released on February 18. Taewoon also took charge in most of the writing, composing, and producing of the album, and the group gave a lot of direct input in their choreography. Alongside the album, Speed released two music videos "Don't Tease Me" and 'Why I'm Not'. Taewoon's solo track 'Focus' was also included in the mini album.

Speed also released a repackaged edition called Look at Me Now with three additional tracks. They released the music video for 'Zombie Party' on March 18, featuring Shannon. On April 3 they posted the music video to 'Look At Me Now'.

=== 2015–2016: Line-up change, Speed On, disbandment ===
In January 2015, MBK Entertainment announced that Speed would have their comeback this spring with two additional members.

In March 2015, leader Taewoon announced his departure from the group, making SPEED an 8-member group with upcoming additional members.

Their new member KI-O was first revealed to the public with his participation in the winter project single "Don't Forget Me" alongside Speed members Sejun and Jongkook, members of The SeeYa, T-ARA and Former F-ve Dolls member Cho Seunghee in February. He also featured in Elsie's (T-ARA's Eunjung) music video and performances of her solo debut song "I'm Good", which originally featured K.Will.

On June 1, 2015, SPEED released their 2nd mini-album SPEED ON. Later that day their music video for "What U" was revealed, featuring new member KI-O. Yuhwan had taken over as SPEED's new leader after Taewoon's departure.

In November 2015, MBK Entertainment removed the group's profile page from their official website, signifying the group had possibly disbanded. MBK has not confirmed these reports.

On January 27, 2016, Jungwoo announced via his social media that his contract had expired with MBK Entertainment. One day later, Sejun also announced via social media that he left SPEED to pursue his acting career while still signed under MBK Entertainment. In June 2016, Taeha made his solo debut as IONE, while Sungmin signed with Star Camp 202 to pursue his acting career.

== Members ==
=== Past members ===
- Kwanghaeng (광행)
- Jungwoo (정우)
- Taewoon (태운)
- Yuhwan (유환)
- Taeha (태하)
- Noori (누리)
- Jongkook (종국)
- Sejun (세준)
- KI-O (키오)
- Sungmin (성민)

== Discography ==
=== Studio albums ===
Title	Album details	Peak chart positions	Sales
Title	Album details	KOR	Sales
Superior Speed	Released: January 15, 2013; Label: Core Contents Media; Format: CD, digital download	13	KOR: 2,726

=== Extended plays ===
Title	Album details	Peak chart positions	Sales
Title	Album details	KOR	Sales
Speed Circus	Released: February 18, 2014; Label: Core Contents Media; Format: CD, digital download	17	KOR: 2,856
Speed On	Released: June 1, 2015; Label: Core Contents Media; Format: CD, digital download	11	KOR: 2,113

=== Singles ===
Title	Year	Peak chart positions	Sales	Album
Title	Year	KOR	Sales	Album
"Lovey-Dovey Plus"	2012	—		Hommage to Lovey-Dovey
"That's My Fault" (슬픈약속) (feat. Davichi)	2013	24	KOR: 143,628	Superior Speed
"It's Over" (feat. Park Bo-young)	2013	43	KOR: 114,461	Superior Speed
"Pain" (통증)	2013	76	KOR: 35,829	Blow Speed
"Don't Tease Me!" (놀리러 간다)	2014	95	KOR: 16,110	Speed Circus
"Zombie Party!" (좀비 파티)	2014	—		Look At Me Now
"Look At Me Now"	2014	—		Look At Me Now
"What U"	2015	—		Speed On
"—" denotes release did not chart.

== Filmography ==
=== Variety/Reality show ===
Year	Title	Network	Note
2013	SPEED's Dreaming Polaris	Mnet	SPEED's Reality documentaries

== Videography ==
=== Music videos ===
Year	Title	Length	Notes
2012	Lovey Dovey Plus Ver.1	4:10	Features ex-T-ara Ryu Hwayoung and 5dolls's Ryu Hyoyoung.
2012	Lovey Dovey Plus Ver.2	4:16	Features ex-T-ara Ryu Hwayoung and 5dolls's Ryu Hyoyoung.
2013	슬픈약속 "That's My Fault" (Drama Ver.)	13:17	Drama version features Park Bo-young, A Pink's Naeun, Ji Chang-wook, and Ha Seok-jin.
2013	슬픈약속 "That's My Fault" (Dance Ver.)	4:18	Featuring Davichi's Kang Minkyung.
2013	It's Over (Drama Ver.)	14:30	Drama version features Park Bo-young, A Pink's Naeun, Ji Chang-wook, and Ha Seok-jin.
2013	It's Over (Dance Ver.)	3:36	Featuring Actress Park Bo-young.
2013	Never Say Goodbye	1:30	
2013	통증 (Pain)훌렁 휴양과	3:31	
2014	Focus	2:29	Taewoon Solo.
2014	왜 난 꼭 (Why I'm Not?)	3:52	Starring model Hwang Hyunjoo.
2014	눌리러 간다 (Don't Tease Me!)	3:58	Performance in Showcase.
2014	좀비파티 (Zombie Party)	4:12	Starring singer Shannon Williams.
2014	Look At Me Now	3:52	
2015	What U	3:44	
2015	선물 같은 단 한 사람 (Baby U)	3:44	Directed by Sejun.

== Awards and nominations ==
Year	Awards	Nominated work	Category	Result
2013	Cyworld Digital Music Awards	"It's Over" (feat. Park Bo-young)	Rookie of the Month (January)	Won
