= Coed School =

South Korean band

- Origin: South Korea
- Genre: K-pop
- Years active: 2010–2013
- Label: Core Contents Media
- Spinoffs: F-ve Dolls; Speed
- Past members: Soomi; Taewoon; Sungmin; Yoosung; Hyoyoung; Hyewon; Kwanghaeng; Kangho; Chanmi; Noori

Korean name
- Hangul: 남녀공학
- Hanja: 男女共學
- RR: Namnyeo gonghak
- MR: Namnyŏ konghak

Coed School (Korean: 남녀공학) was a South Korean pop group formed by record company Core Contents Media in 2010. The co-ed group consisted of four female members: Soomi, Hyoyoung, Hyewon, and Chanmi; and six male members: Taewoon, Sungmin, Jungwoo, Kwanghaeng, Kangho, and Noori. The group was eventually divided into two sub-units: an all female-group called F-ve Dolls (2011) and an all-male group called SPEED (2012).

== History ==
=== 2010: Debut and Something That Is Cheerful and Fresh ===
Just under three weeks since their debut, the group followed up "Too Late" with a second single, "Bbiribbom Bberibbom" (삐리뽐 빼리뽐). The music video for the song was recorded on October 11, 2010, and features T-ara member Ham Eun-jeong. The video, along with a second music video for ballad "Nae Simjangeul Ttwige Haneun Mar" (내 심장을 뛰게 하는 말 "I Love You A Thousand Times"), was released on October 18. The single itself was released on October 19, and they performed "Bbiribbom Bberibbom" for the first time the next day on M! Countdown. "Bbiribbom Bberibbom" peaked at number 61 on the Gaon Chart.

The group's debut mini album, Something That Is Cheerful and Fresh, was released on October 28, 2010. It features the three previously released songs and various remixes. Despite being limited to 20,000 copies, Core Contents Media announced that the album had received 50,000 pre-orders and announced increase production of albums therefore selling roughly 47,000 albums.

=== 2011: F-ve Dolls debut, Charming Five Girls ===
The four female members of the band, with new member Seo Eunkyo, were announced by Core Contents Media to debut as a sub group called 5dolls. On February 7, 2011 5dolls released the music video for their debut single "Ipsul Jaguk" (입술자국 "Lip Stains"), which was produced by Brave Brothers. The music video was also directed by Cha Eun-taek. The MV also featured Jay Park. On February 16 they released the MV for "Neo Mariya" (너 말이야 "Your Words") from their debut mini-album "Charming Five Dolls".

F-ve Dolls released their 2nd mini-album "Time To Play" on May 11, 2011 with the lead single "Like This Or That" (이러쿵 저러쿵) and its accompanying music video.

=== 2012: SPEED debut, Hommage to Lovey-Dovey ===
In early 2012 the group's male sub-unit SPEED debuted with the digital single Hommage To Lovey-Dovey. The group debuted as 5 without Kangho, who was removed from the group after online accusations of rape as well as underage drinking, and replaced by Jongkook of "Superstar K3". Hommage to Lovey-Dovey contains 2 songs, and was released as a tribute to T-ara's song Lovey-Dovey.

=== 2013-2014: Disbandment ===
Around mid-2013, a representative of Core Contents Media stated in an interview that they have no plans for Co-Ed School to promote as a full group as both of its sub-units had grown and changed their line-ups to become independent ensembles. By late 2014, all of the group's members had left the agency, thus confirming the group's disbandment.

== Members ==
=== Former ===
- Soomi (수미) – former leader, vocalist, rapper (2010–2012)
- Taewoon (태운) – rapper, vocalist (2010–2013)
- Sungmin (성민) – rapper, vocalist (2010–2013)
- Yoosung (유성) – leader, vocalist (2010–2013)
- Hyoyoung (효영) – vocalist (2010–2013)
- Hyewon (혜원) – vocalist (2010–2013)
- Kwanghaeng (광행) – rapper (2010–2012)
- Kangho (강호) – rapper, vocalist (2010–2012)
- Chanmi (찬미) – vocalist (2010–2012)
- Noori (누리) – rapper, vocalist (2010–2012)

=== Sub-units ===
- F-ve Dolls (Soomi, Hyoyoung, Chanmi and Hyewon; 2011–2015)
- SPEED (Taewoon, Sungmin, Yoosung, Kwanghaeng, Noori; 2012–2015)

== Discography ==
=== Extended play ===
Title	Album details	Peak chart position
Title	Album details	KOR
Something That Is Cheerful and Fresh	Released: October 28, 2010; Label: Core Contents Media; Format: CD, digital download	8

=== Singles ===
Title	Year	Peak chart positions	Album
Title	Year	KOR	Album
"Too Late"	2010	13	Something That Is Cheerful and Fresh
"Bbiribbom Bberibbom"	2010	61	Something That Is Cheerful and Fresh
