= Choi Sung-min =

South Korean singer and actor

- Born: December 7, 1995 (age 30); Yanggu, Gangwon Province, South Korea
- Occupations: Actor; singer
- Years active: 2010–present
- Agent: Management Air
- Relatives: Choi Ye-na (sister)
- Musical career
- Genre: K-pop
- Instrument: Vocal
- Years active: 2010–2015
- Label: MBK
- Formerly of: Speed; Coed School

Korean name
- Hangul: 최성민
- Hanja: 崔成旻
- RR: Choe Seongmin
- MR: Ch'oe Sŏngmin

Choi Sung-min (Korean: 최성민; born December 7, 1995), is a South Korean actor and singer. Choi debuted as a member of mixed group Coed School in 2010 before joined the male unit of the group Speed in 2012 and continued until the group disbanded in 2015. Following the disbandment, he transitioned into acting and signed with Star Camp 202.

== Life and career ==
=== 1995–2015: Early life and career beginnings ===
Choi Sung-min was born on December 7, 1995, in Yanggu, Gangwon Province, South Korea. He graduated from Anyang High School of Art on February 7, 2014. He attended Plug-in Music Middle School and Joy Dance Academy. He is the older brother of singer Choi Ye-na.

Choi made an appearance on the SBS variety show Star King before being recruited by MBK Entertainment and becoming the tenth member of Coed School in 2010. The group made their official debut on September 30, 2010, and later separated into a female unit and a male unit. Sungmin debuted as a member of Coed School's male unit, Speed, in 2012. The unit made their first performance on Music Bank on February 17, 2012. The unit later became an independent group after Core Contents Media disbanded Coed School.

Choi made his acting debut in the KBS Drama Special Something Like That in 2013. He was cast as Yeom Chi-joo in the KBS drama My Dear Cat in 2014.

In late 2015, it was reported that Speed had disbanded after their profile was removed from MBK Entertainment's website, but MBK Entertainment has not confirmed the reports.

=== 2016–present: Acting career ===
On June 26, 2016, Sungmin signed a contract with the talent agency Star Camp 202 to pursue his acting career.

In July 2017, he appeared in the supporting role of Han Duk-soo in KBS2's School 2017. He also appeared in SBS' Reunited Worlds.

It was revealed by his sister Choi Ye-na that he has enlisted to Korean military in July 2019.

In September 2021, Choi signed a contract with Management Air, a contract signed after his discharge from the military.

== Discography ==
Year	Album	Song	Notes
2013	Painkiller	"Tears of Mind"	with Taewoon, Eunkyo, Yoojin and Soyeon

== Filmography ==
=== Television series ===
Year	Title	Role	Network
2002–2003	The Dawn of the Empire	Crown Prince Hyoseong	KBS1
2013	KBS Drama Special: Chagall's Birthday	Jin-goo	KBS2
2014	My Dear Cat	Yum Chi-joo	KBS1
2016	The Love Is Coming	Kim Ho-young	SBS
2016	KBS Drama Special: The Legendary Shuttle	Kim Min-soo	KBS2
2017	School 2017	Han Duk-soo	KBS2
2017	Reunited Worlds	Dong-hyun	SBS
2018	Risky Romance	Min-gi	MBC

=== Television show ===
Year	Title	Role	Ref.
2010	Star King	Contestant	
2022	Family Register Mate	Special member	
2023	Ghost Story Club	Cast Member	
