= Lee Seo-an =

South Korean actress and singer (born 1989)

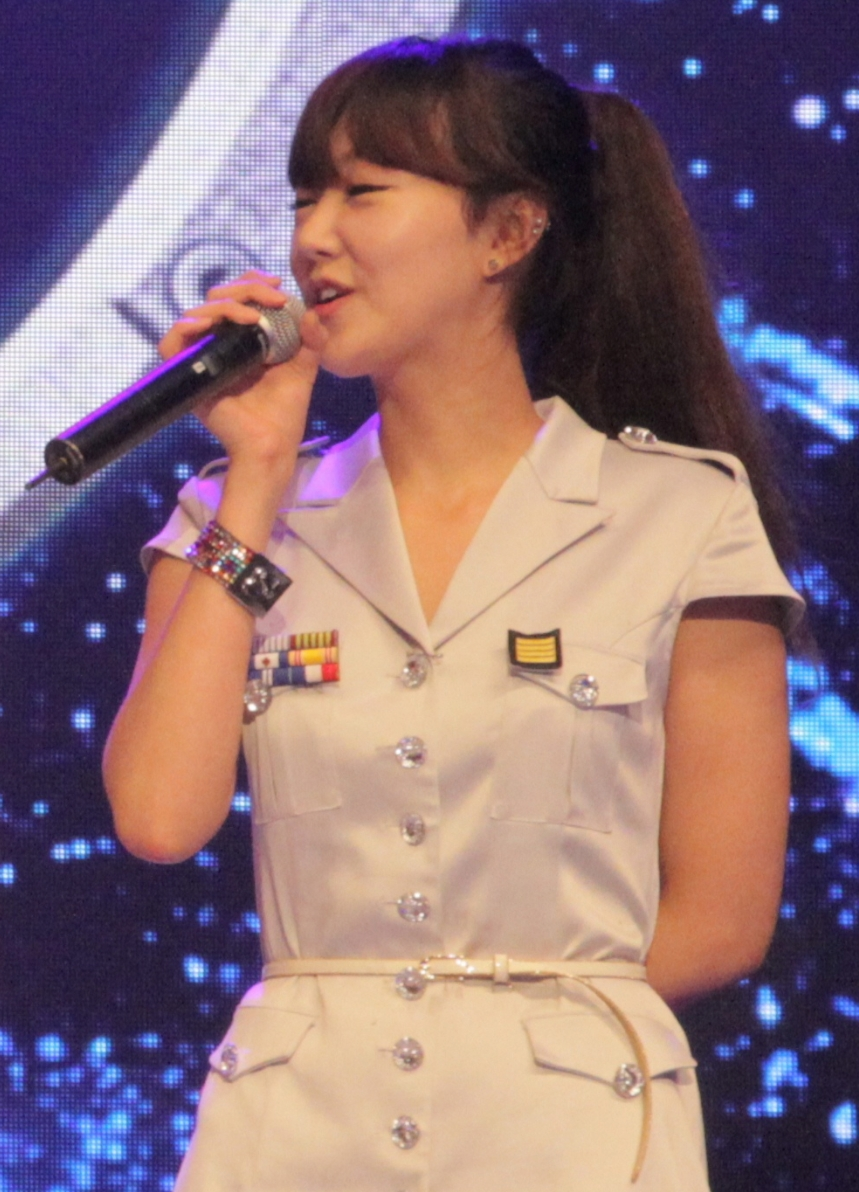
- Lee in 2011
- Born: Lee Soo-mi; March 3, 1989 (age 37); Seongnam, South Korea
- Occupations: Actress; singer
- Years active: 2009–present
- Agent: Billions
- Musical career
- Genre: K-pop
- Instrument: Vocals
- Years active: 2009–2012
- Labels: Core Contents Media; D-Business
- Formerly of: Seeya; Coed School; F-ve Dolls

Korean name
- Hangul: 이수미
- RR: I Sumi
- MR: I Sumi

Stage name
- Hangul: 이서안
- RR: I Seoan
- MR: I Sŏan

Lee Soo-mi (Korean: 이수미; born March 3, 1989), professionally known by her stage name Lee Seo-an, is a South Korean actress and former singer. Using her birth name, Lee debuted as a new member of SeeYa in 2009. She was active in SeeYa for a short time before joining the new co-ed group Coed School in 2010. After Coed School split, the female members became the new girl group F-ve Dolls in 2011, with Lee as the oldest member. In 2012, Lee terminated her contract with Core Contents Media and signed to D-Business Entertainment in 2013 to pursue her solo career. After taking a break for three years, Lee transitioned into acting and is currently signed to Billions.

== Early life ==
Lee auditioned for SBS's Young Jae Yook Sung Project in 2001 and won, but never became a trainee. She attended the Korea Aerospace University and graduated in Aeronautical Science and Flight Operations.

== Career ==
=== 2009–2012: Career beginnings ===
In August 2009, Lee was announced as a new member of SeeYa to replace Nam Gyu-ri, who left the group. Lee officially debuted with the release of the group's mini album Rebloom on October 28.

On July 23, 2010, it was announced that Lee would join the line-up of a new co-ed group, Coed School, which also confirmed that she was dropped from SeeYa. The group officially debuted with the mini album Something That Is Cheerful and Fresh on September 27, 2010. In December 2010, Core Contents Media announced the formation of Coed School's female unit called 5Dolls (later F-ve Dolls), including Lee, other female members of Coed School, and a new member. On February 16, 2011, the group released their debut mini album Charming Five Girls.

In February 2012, Lee left the group to pursue her solo career.

=== 2013–present: Transition into acting ===
In December 2013, Lee was announced to return as an actress and would star in D-Unit's "It's You" music video.

Lee was cast in IQIYI's Hello Mr. Right in 2016.

In July 2019, Lee was cast as Jung Hae-jin in the KBS2 drama Justice.

In August 2020, Lee was confirmed to portray Oh Young-ju in KBS2's Do Do Sol Sol La La Sol.

In November 2021, Lee starred in the JTBC drama Artificial City as the Sungjin Group's youngest daughter named Jung Eun-jung.

== Filmography ==
=== Television series ===
Year	Title	Role	Notes	Ref.
2011	The Greatest Love	Candies member		
2016	Hello Mr. Right	Ye Qing Wen		
2017	Criminal Minds	Han Seung-hye		
2017	Meloholic	Baek Seol-A	Special appearance	
2018	Nice Witch	Bae Yoon-hee		
2018	Ms. Ma, Nemesis	Seo So-jung		
2019	Justice	Jeong Hae-jin		
2020	When the Weather is Fine	Jo Young-mi	Special appearance (Ep.11)	
2020	Mystic Pop-up Bar	Chae Su-gyung	Special appearance (Ep.6)	
2020	Do Do Sol Sol La La Sol	Oh Young-joo		
2021	Sell Your Haunted House	Lee Hyun-ju	Special appearance (Ep.9-10)	
2021	Artificial City	Jung Eun-jung		
2021	Bad and Crazy	Jung Yoo-na	Special appearance (Ep.1-4)	
2022	Big Mouth	Seung-tae's wife		
2022	Love is for Suckers	Jo Ri-eun	Special appearance (Ep.4-5)	
2024	Queen of Divorce	Han Ji-in		
2024	The Impossible Heir	Jung Ji-sun	Special appearance	
2024	The Midnight Studio	Yoon Ji-young		
2024	Jeongnyeon: The Star Is Born	Ms. Yang	Special appearance (Ep.3)	
2024	Sorry Not Sorry	Min-jeong	Special appearance (Ep.11-12)	
2025	Dear X	Im Sun-ye	Special appearance (Ep.1-2)	
2026	Reborn Rookie	Na Eun-se		
