= The SeeYa =

South Korean girl group

- Origin: Seoul, South Korea
- Genres: K-pop; R&B; Ballad
- Years active: 2012–2015
- Label: MBK Entertainment
- Past members: Minkyung; Youngjoo; Yoojin; Yeonkyung

The SeeYa (Korean: 더 씨야; stylized as The SEEYA) was a South Korean R&B girl group that consisted of Minkyung, Youngjoo, Yoojin and Yeonkyung. They debuted on November 12, 2012, with the single album Good To Seeya featuring the title track "Be With You". They had their debut stage on November 15, 2012, at M! Countdown. In the last part of 2015, their profile page was removed and many speculated the group disbanded.

== History ==
=== 2012–13: Debut with Good To Seeya and Love U ===
Their debut single, "Be With You", was released in two versions, the main version featuring former Speed member Taewoon and the other version is female only. One of the music videos featured actors Joo Sang-wook and Im Jung-eun with direction by Chang (Death Bell). The debut single album Good To Seeya was released in November 12. The SeeYa released their first mini album, Love U, in December.

In June 2013, Core Contents Media released digital song "Painkiller". The song was a collaboration with T-ara, The SeeYa, F-ve dolls and Speed.

In July 2013, Yeonkyung was confirmed to be joining girl group F-ve Dolls. She will simultaneously promote as a member of both groups.

=== 2014: Tears, Love Is and Crazy Love ===
The SeeYa was released two single album In January 2014. The group's released their second single-album Tears with title track called "More & More" on January 3 and released their third single-album Love Is with title track called "Tell Me" on January 21.

End of 2014, The SeeYa released their fourth single-album Crazy Love with title track called "The Song Of Love" collaboration with EXID's LE was released In December 29.

=== 2015: U & Me and Disbandment ===
On February 10, 2015, MBK Entertainment artists consists : T-ara, Speed, The SeeYa and Cho Seunghee made their participation on MBK project group called "TS" and was released winter song called "Don't Forget Me".

In March 2015, MBK confirmed that F-ve Dolls was disbanded and later Yeonkyung would only focus on promoting with The SeeYa.

On 21 April 2015, The Seeya released their fifth single U & ME with title track "Wedding March".

In November 2015, MBK Entertainment removed the group's profile page from their official website. The group ultimately disbanded.

On May 18, 2016, Yoojin made appearance on SBS' War of Vocals - God's Voice. She also confirmed that The SeeYa has disbanded.

== Members ==
- Minkyung (민경)
- Youngjoo (영주)
- Yoojin (유진)
- Yeonkyung (연경)

== Discography ==
=== EPs ===
Title	Album details	Peak chart positions	Sales
Title	Album details	KOR	Sales
Love U	Released: December 6, 2012; Label: Core Contents Media; Format: CD, digital download; Track list: 1. Poison (독약) (Feat. Lee Hae-ri); 2. Last Dinner (이별만찬); 3. Your Wedding (너의 결혼식); 4. The Winter (그 겨울); 5. Poison (독약) (The Seeya ver.); 6. Be With You (내 맘은 죽어가요) (Female ver.); 7. Be With You (내 맘은 죽어가요) (Feat. Speed)	15	KOR: 1,360

=== Singles ===
Title	Year	Peak chart positions	Sales	Album
Title	Year	KOR	Sales	Album
"Be With You" (내 맘은 죽어가요) (feat. Speed)	2012	14	KOR: 272,833	Love U
"Poison" (독약) (feat. Lee Hae-ri)	2012	28	KOR: 288,816	Love U
"Tear Up" (눈물이 핑돌아) (with Gavy NJ)	2013	30	KOR: 115,155	Non-album singles
"More & More" (하면 할수록) (with Son Ho-jun)	2014	21	KOR: 114,309	Non-album singles
"Tell Me"	2014	25	KOR: 93,574	Non-album singles
"The Song Of Love" (사랑의 노래) (with LE)	2014	66	KOR: 24,724	Non-album singles
"Wedding March" (웨딩마치)	2015	94	KOR: 20,382	Non-album singles
