= F-ve Dolls =

South Korean girl group

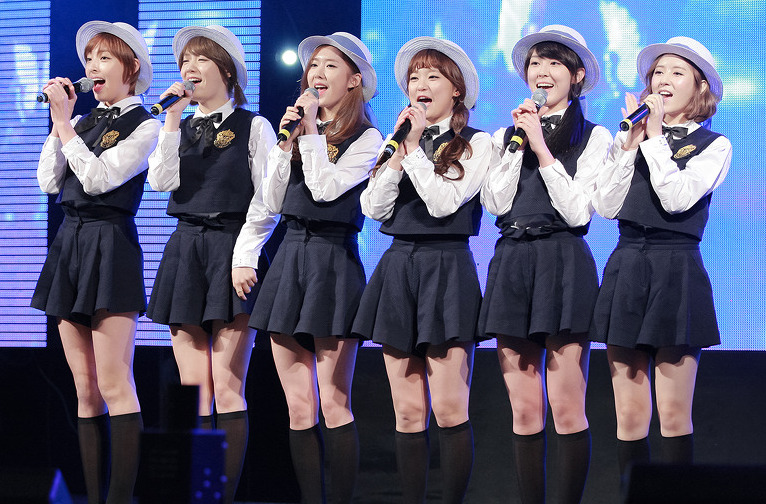
- F-ve Dolls in 2013. (L–R: Hyewon, Hyoyoung, Seunghee, Eunkyo, Yeonkyung, and Nayeon)

Background information
- Also known as: 5dolls
- Origin: Seoul, South Korea
- Genres: K-pop; dance-pop
- Years active: 2011–2015
- Labels: Core Contents Media; GM Contents Media (2012)
- Spinoff of: Coed School (2011–2013) (Note: Coed School disbanded in 2013, resulting in F-ve Dolls becoming an independent group.)
- Past members: Soomi; Seunghee; Nayeon; Chanmi; Hyoyoung; Yeonkyung; Eunkyo; Hyewon

F-ve Dolls (Korean: 파이브돌스; sometimes stylized in all caps, formerly known as 5dolls) was a South Korean girl group formed by Core Contents Media in 2011. The group was composed of six members: Hyoyoung, Seunghee, Yeonkyung, Hyewon, Eunkyo and Nayeon. They debuted with two single tracks, "Lip Stains" (입술자국) and "I Mean You" (너 말이야), in 2011. The group was known as "Female Unit" of Coed School until CCM's announced that the group became independent in 2013, originally as five members, Soomi and Chanmi left the group’s line-up on 2012, The group disbanded on March 10, 2015.

== History ==
=== 2010: Formation ===
In December 2010, Coed School broke into sub-groups. The female members Lee Soo-mi, Heo Chan-mi, Ryu Hyo-young and Jin Hye-won, with the addition of new member Seo Eun-kyo, became 5dolls.

=== 2011: Debut with Lip Stains, Charming Five Girls, Time to Play ===
On January 20, 2011, 5dolls released two promotional videos featuring Jay Park, one called "Lip Stains" and the other one called "I Mean You" (or "It's You"). The group released its first mini album on February 16, 2011, and debuted on M Countdown on February 17, 2011. During their live performances, the group received criticism for presumably lip synching. 5dolls released their second mini-album Time To Play on May 11, 2011, with their lead single "Like This Or That" (이러쿵 저러쿵) and the music video. "Like This or That" stands as the highest selling song for a rookie of 2011 with US$192,000 grossed.

=== 2012–13: Line-up changes, Since 1971, First Love ===
In 2012, saw the departure of both Soomi and Chanmi from the group, in February and summer respectively. Han Na-yeon and Shannon were announced as replacements and, in February 2013, trainee Choi Ji-hyun was also said to be joining the group, thus becoming six. On July 8, 2013, the group officially announced that they would be returning at the end of the month with a new single called "Soulmate #1" as well as a new stage name, F-ve Dolls. However, of the three new members announced, only Nayeon stayed, and the other two gaps were filled by Cho Seung-hee and The SeeYa member Oh Yeon-kyung, who simultaneously promoted the two groups. On July 31, 2013, their first digital single "Since 1971" was released with the music video of the title track "Soulmate #1". The song charted 62 on the Gaon Chart and 44 on the Billboard Korea Hot 100. F-ve Dolls promoted "Soulmate #1" from July 31 through September 1, 2013.

F-ve Dolls followed-up promotions with a new mini-album called "First Love", which was released on September 17. The group promoted with the song "Can You Love Me?", which features new T-ara N4 member Kim Dani, making it her debut. On 17 September 2013, a second version of "Can You Love Me?" music video and a music video for the song "Deceive" were released.

=== 2014–2015: Disbandment ===
In November 2014, it was reported that F-ve Dolls was disbanded after their labels were renamed, and subsequently F-ve dolls was deleted from the official label's website. On March 10, 2015, the label confirmed the official disbandment of the group. It was stated that those members who still had a contract with the agency will be part of a new group. In September 2015, Cho Seunghee re-debuted with new group DIA, but she left the group the following year to focus on her acting career.

== Members ==
=== Past members ===
- Lee Soo-mi (이수미) (2011-2012)
- Cho Seung-hee (조승희) (2012-2015)
- Han Na-yeon (한나연) (2013-2015)
- Heo Chan-mi (허찬미) (2011-2012)
- Ryu Hyo-young (류효영) (2011-2015)
- Oh Yeon-kyung (오연경) (2013-2015)
- Seo Eun-kyo (서은교) (2011-2015)
- Jin Hye-won (진혜원) (2011-2015)

=== Temporary members ===
- Shannon (샤넌) (2012-2013)
- Choi Ji-hyun (최지현) (2013)

== Discography ==
=== Extended plays ===
Title	Album Details	Peak chart positions	Sales
Title	Album Details	KOR	Sales
Charming Five Girls	Released: February 16, 2011; Label: Core Contents Media; Format: CD, digital download; Track list: 1. Your Words (너 말이야); 2. Lip Stains (입술자국); 3. Jjureureureureu (쭈르르르르); 4. You're So Great (잘났어); 5. Wait A Second (거기 잠깐)	42	KOR: 2,351
Club Remix Time to Play	Released: May 11, 2011; Label: Core Contents Media; Format: CD, digital download; Track list: 1. Time to Play (Intro); 2. Like This or That (이러쿵 저러쿵); 3. Without You (네가 없이도); 4. Your Words (Remix Ver.) (너 말이야); 5. Lip Stains (Remix Ver.) (입술자국); 6. Jjureureureureu (Remix Ver.) (쭈르르르르); 7. You're So Great (Remix Ver.) (잘났어); 8. Wait A Second (Remix Ver.) (거기 잠깐)	10	KOR: 2,442
First Love	Released: September 17, 2013; Label: Core Contents Media; Format: CD, digital download; Track list: 1. Can You Love Me? (사랑한다? 안한다!) (Feat. Dani); 2. Deceived (사기쳤어); 3. LOV; 4. NONONO; 5. Soulmate #1 (Original Ver.) (짝1호); 6. Soulmate #1 (Remix) (짝1호)	14	KOR: 2,384

=== Singles ===
Year	Title	Peak chart position		Downloads	Album
Year	Title	Gaon Chart	Hot 100	Downloads	Album
2011	"Lip Stains"	80	—	—N/a	Charming Five Dolls
2011	"Your Words"	6	—	KOR: 480,547	Charming Five Dolls
2011	"Like This Or That"	16	—	KOR: 1,162,285	Time To Play
2013	"Soulmate #1"	62	44	KOR: 27,106	First Love
2013	"Can You Love Me?"	39	19	KOR: 78,852	First Love
"—" denotes items that did not chart or were not released.

=== Music videos ===
Year	Music video	Length
2011	"Lip Stains"	7:43
2011	"I Mean You"	7:40
2011	"Like This or That"	3:38
2013	"Soulmate #1"	5:02
2013	"Can You Love Me?"	3:26
2013	"Can You Love Me?" Ver.2	3:28
2013	"Deceive"	3:27
