= 2007 Mnet KM Music Festival =

9th edition of the MAMA Awards held in 2007

- Date: November 17, 2007
- Location: Seoul Sports Complex, Seoul, South Korea
- Hosted by: Shin Dong-yup and Lee Da-hae
- Most awards: Big Bang, Epik High, Clazziquai (2)
- Most nominations: Big Bang, Yangpa, SG Wannabe (5)
- Website: Mnet KM Music Video Festival

Television/radio coverage
- Network: Mnet (South Korea); Mnet Japan (Japan)
- Runtime: Approximately 210 minutes

The 2007 Mnet KM Music Festival (MKMF) took place on November 17, 2007 at the Seoul Sports Complex in Seoul, South Korea. The ceremony was hosted by comedian Shin Dong-yup and actress Lee Da-hae. Big Bang received two awards including Song of the Year (Grand Prize) with Epik High and Clazziquai also receiving two awards with the former receiving Album of the Year (Grand Prize).

== Background ==
The award ceremony was held for the ninth consecutive time. The event took place at the Seoul Olympic Stadium for the first time with Shin Dong-yup as a returning host for the fifth time and Lee Da-hae as his co-host. Japanese artist Gackt performed on the stage for the second time since the sixth ceremony, while co-host Lee Da-hae performed "I Love Rock 'n' Roll" kor. version during the middle of the show. Lee Min Woo (M) and Shin Hye Sung, both members of Shinhwa left the event right before broadcast.

== Performers ==
Artist(s)	Song(s)	Notes
Wiretap In My Ear, Jang Keun-suk	"Tear Me Down", "Wig In A Box", "Angry Inch"	Act #1: Glamorous
Kara, Black Pearl, Girls' Generation, Wonder Girls, Kim Bum	"Break It", "What Should I Do, I Like You", "Into the New World", "Irony"	Act #2: Battle Of Princess
Drunken Tiger, Epik High, SG Wannabe, Kim Heechul, Xuren Ying, Supernova, Clazziquai, Seo In-young	"8:45 Heaven", "Music Is Love"	Act #3: Birth Death Choice
Seoul National Orchestra (SNUPO), Big Bang	"Lies"	Act #4: Symphonic Beat
Lee Da-hae	"I Love Rock 'n' Roll" kor. version	Act #5: I Love Rock N Roll
Park Jin-young (JYP) ft. Wonder Girls	"Don't Leave Me", "Honey", "Life Is Cool", "The House You Live In", "Kiss"	Act #6: JYP is Back
Girls' Generation, The Grace, Super Junior	"Girls' Generation", "One More Time, OK?", "A Man In Love"	Act #7: Fantasia
F.T. Island, Younha and Insooni	"That's What Friends Are For"	Act #8: Friends
Gackt	"Dispar", "Redemption"	Act #9: Promises

== Presenters ==
2007 Mnet KM Music Festival hosts

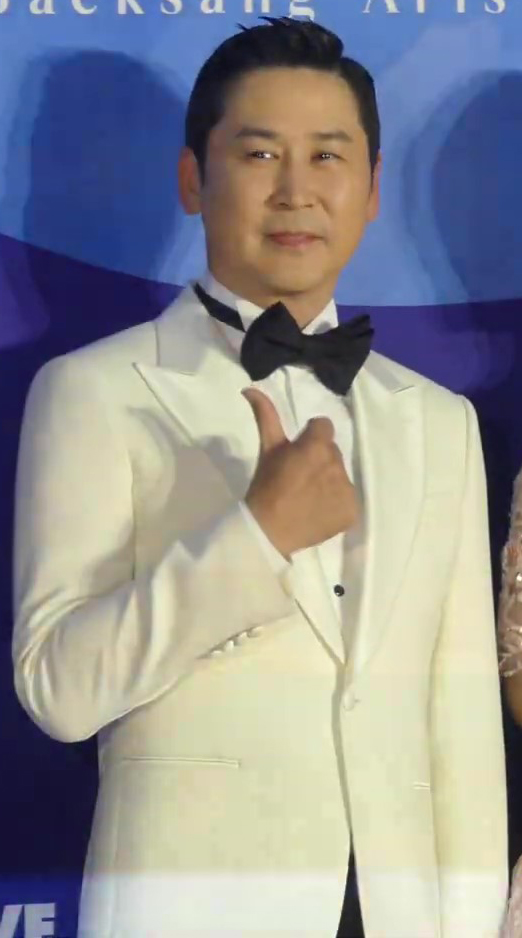
Shin Dong-yup

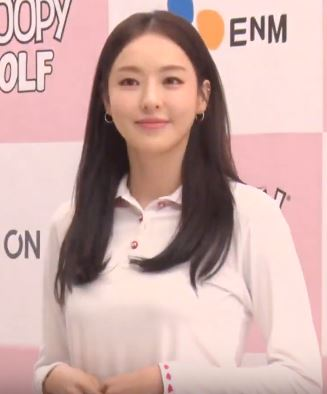
Lee Dae-hee

Name(s)	Role
Shin Dong-yup and Lee Da-hae	Main hosts of the show
Kim Kang-woo and Kim Min-seon (김민선)	Presenters for the award for Best New Artist
Super Junior	Presenters for the award for Best New Male Group
Kim Bum	Presenter for the award for Best New Female Group
우리 and Min Hyo-rin	Presenters for the award for Best House & Electronic
Yoo Se-yoon and Seung-min Woo(우승민)	Presenters for the award for Best Rock Performance
Moon-Suk Choi (최문석) and Sol Bi	Presenters for the award for Auction Netizen Popularity Award
Jang Yoon-ju and Haha	Presenters for the award for Best Ballad Performance
Na Hye Mi and Lou (루)	Presenters for the award for Best Female Group
인혜경 and Joe Cheng	Presenters for the award for Foreign Viewers' Choice Award
Lee Gi-sang (이기상) and Iji (이지)	Presenters for the award for Mnet.com Award
DJ DOC	Presenters for the award for Best Hip Hop Performance
김옥삼 and 임재봉	Presenters for the award for Best Music Video
Chang (창)	Presenter for the award for Music Video Acting
Park Kyung-lim	Presenter for the award for Best Male Artist
Hyeonmi (현미)	Presenter for the award for Album of the Year
내 인생에 내기 걸었네	Presenters for the award for Mobile Popularity Award
Hong Rok-gi (홍록기) and Seo Danbi (서단비)	Presenters for the award for Best Mixed Group
Song Kyung-ah and Han Sang-jin	Presenters for the award for Best R&B Performance
Ji Hyun-woo and Kim Ok-vin	Presenters for the award for Best Dance Performance
Jang Keun-suk	Presenter for the award for Best Female Artist
Choi Jung-won and Park Si-hoo	Presenters for the award for Best Male Group
Lee Beom-soo and Park Si-yeon	Presenters for the award for Artist of the Year
Park Chung-hee (박정희)	Presenter for the award for Song of the Year

== Selection process ==
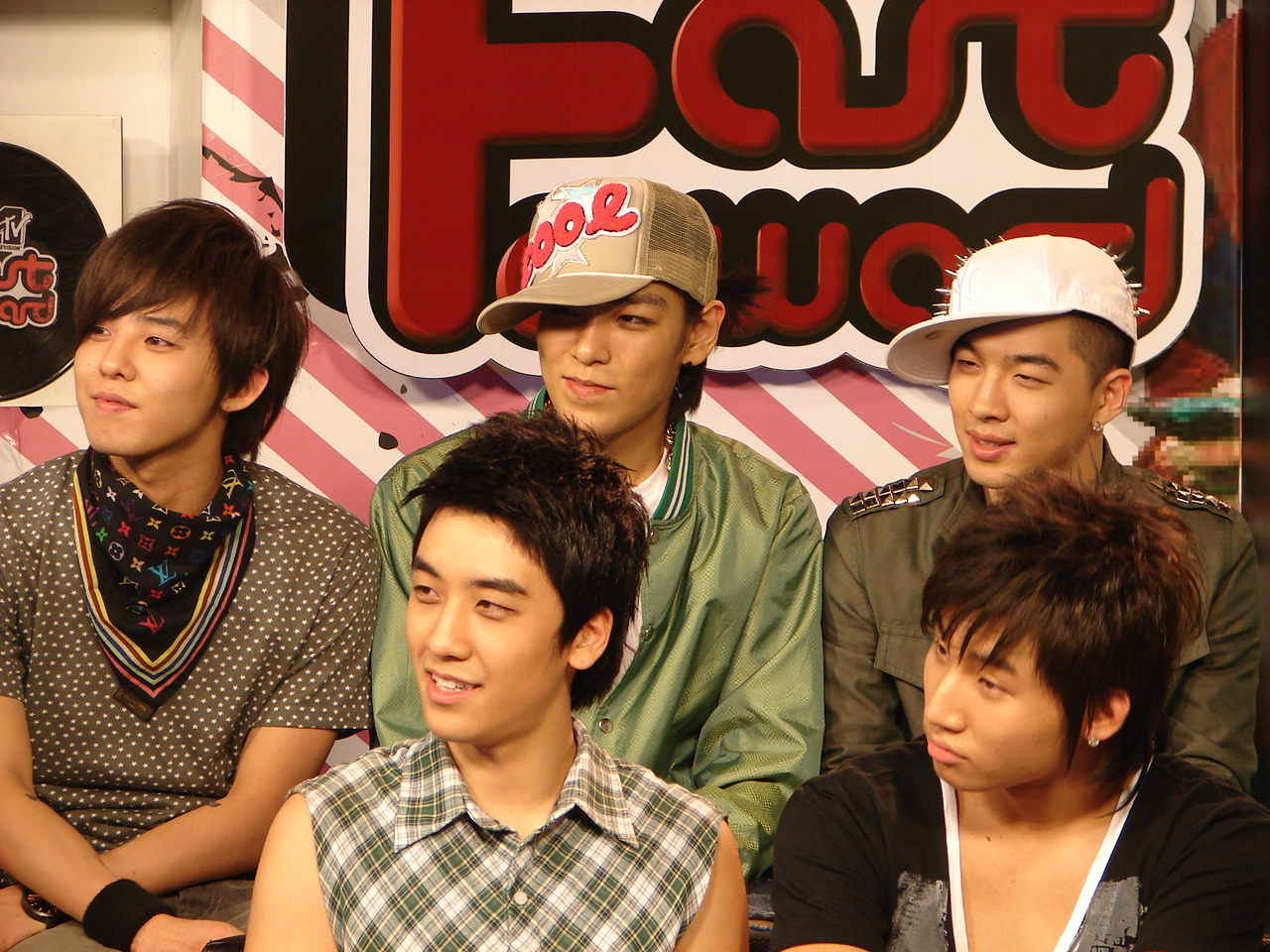
Big Bang won Song of the Year and Best Male Group

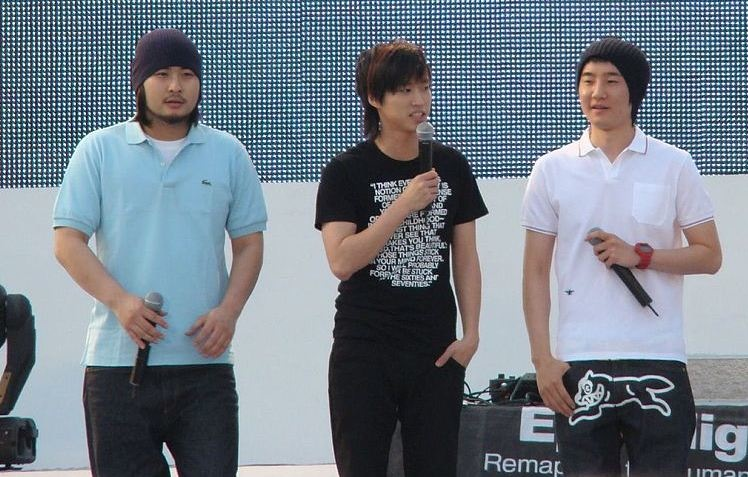
Epik High won Album of the Year and Best Hip Hop Performers

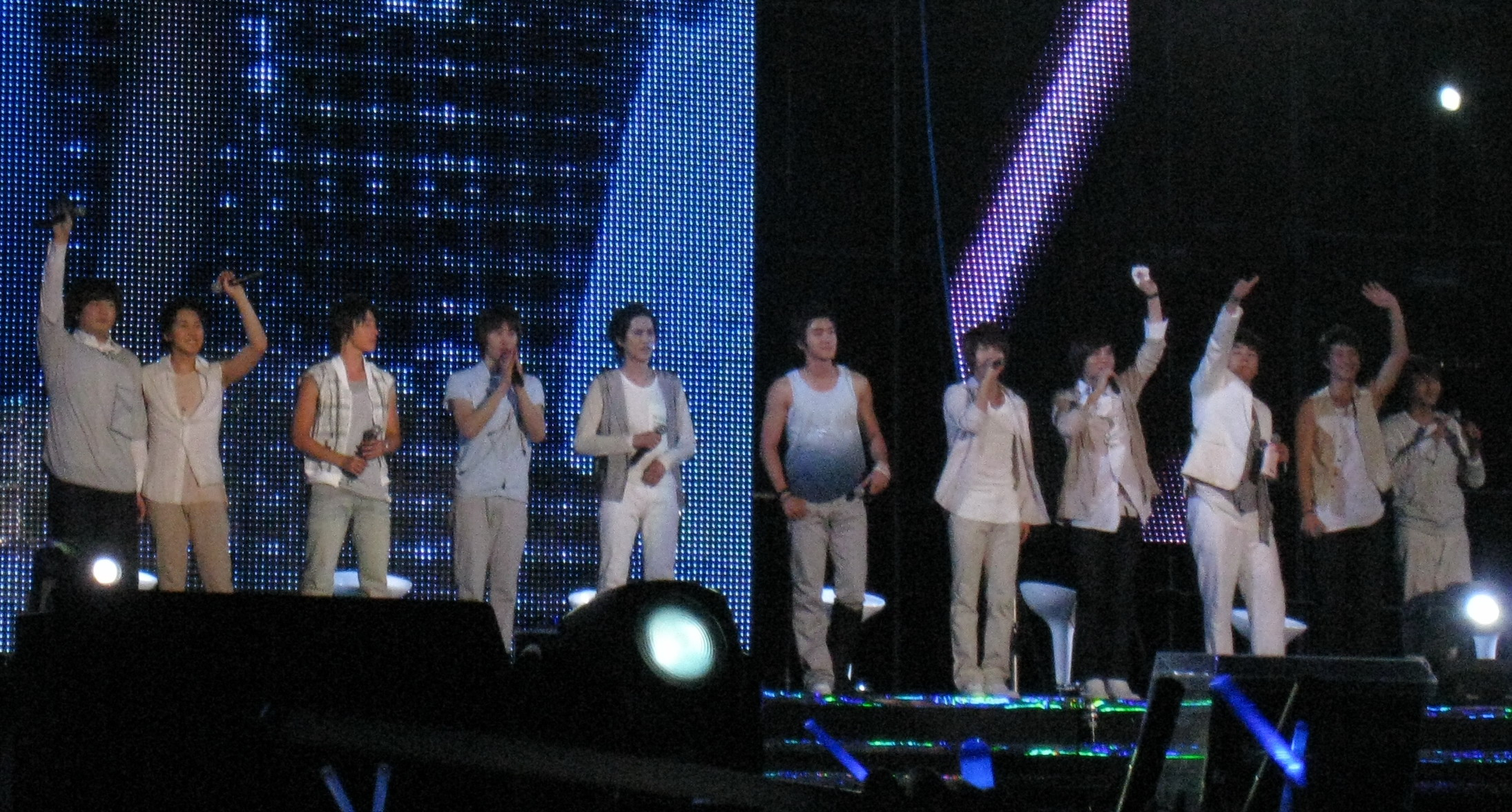
Super Junior won Artist of the Year

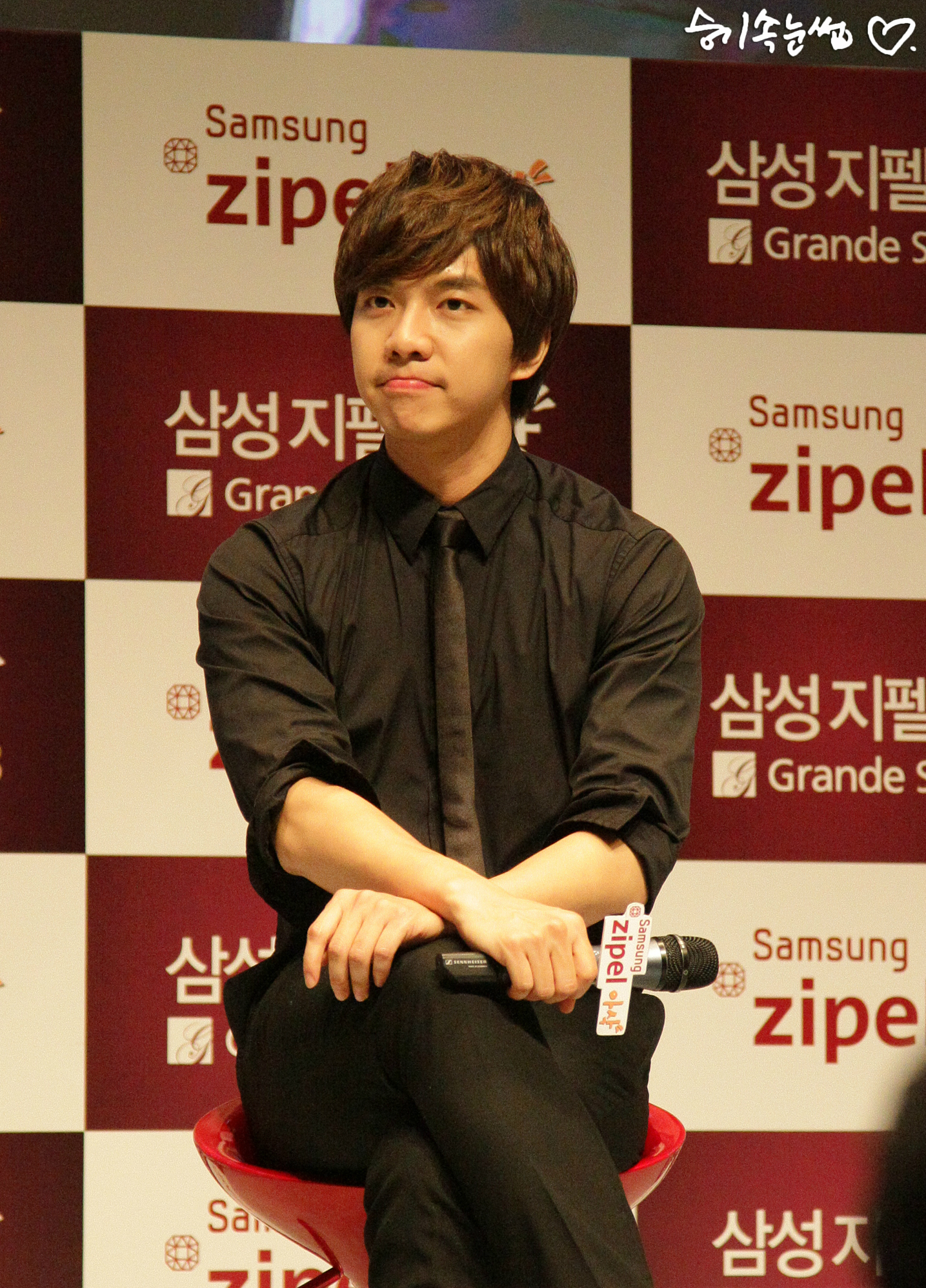
Lee Seung-gi won Best Male Artist

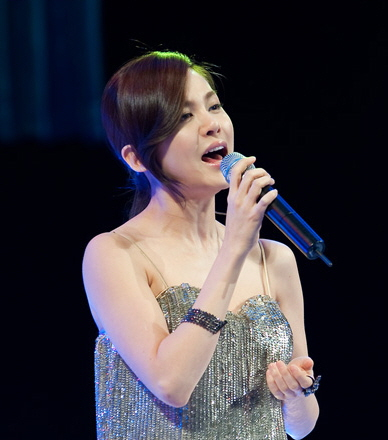
Ivy won Best Female Artist

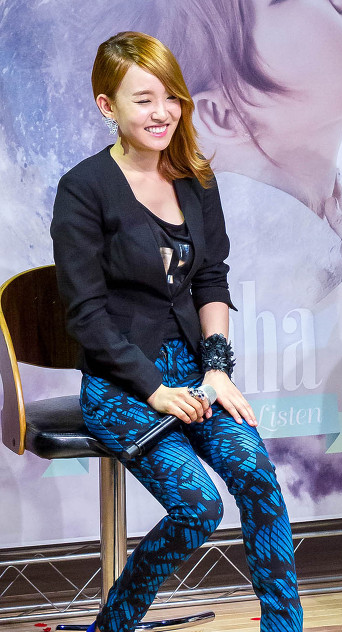
Younha won Best New Artist

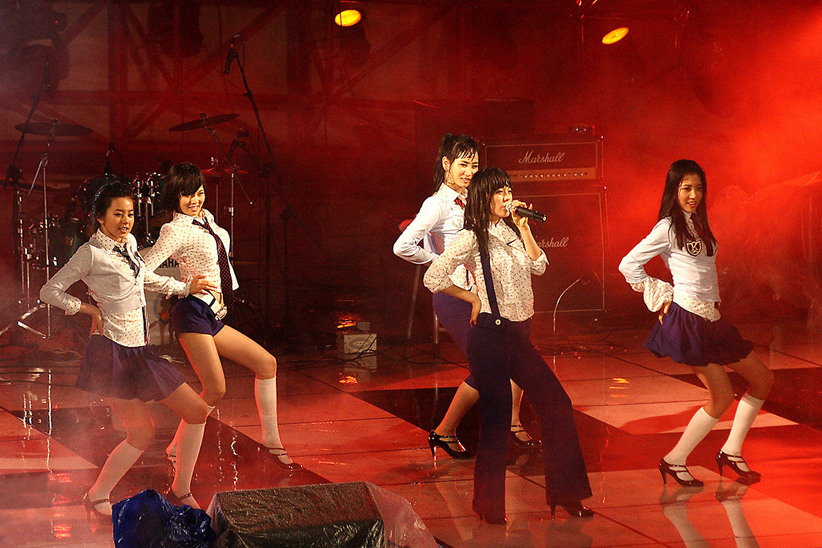
Wonder Girls won Best New Female Group

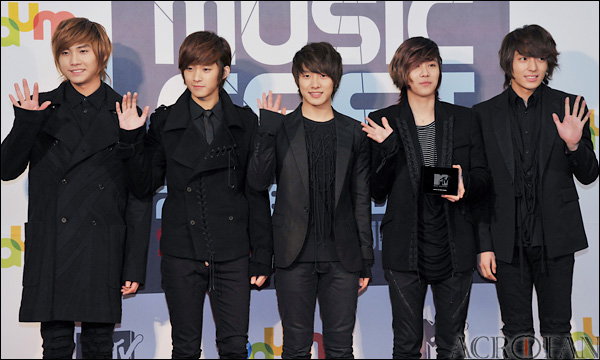
FT Island won Best New Male Group

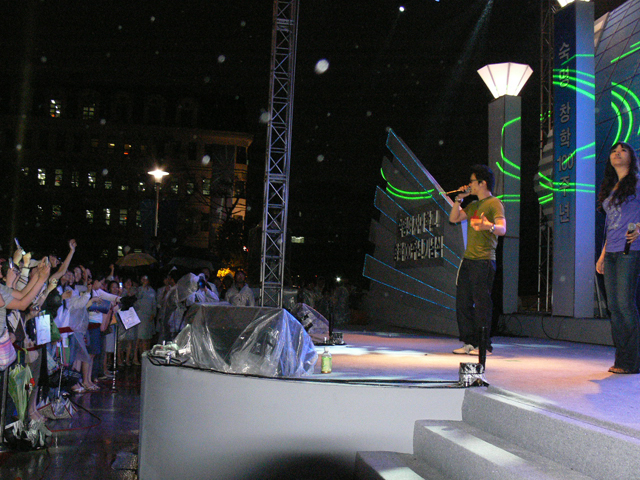
Clazziquai won Best House & Electronic and Best Mixed Group

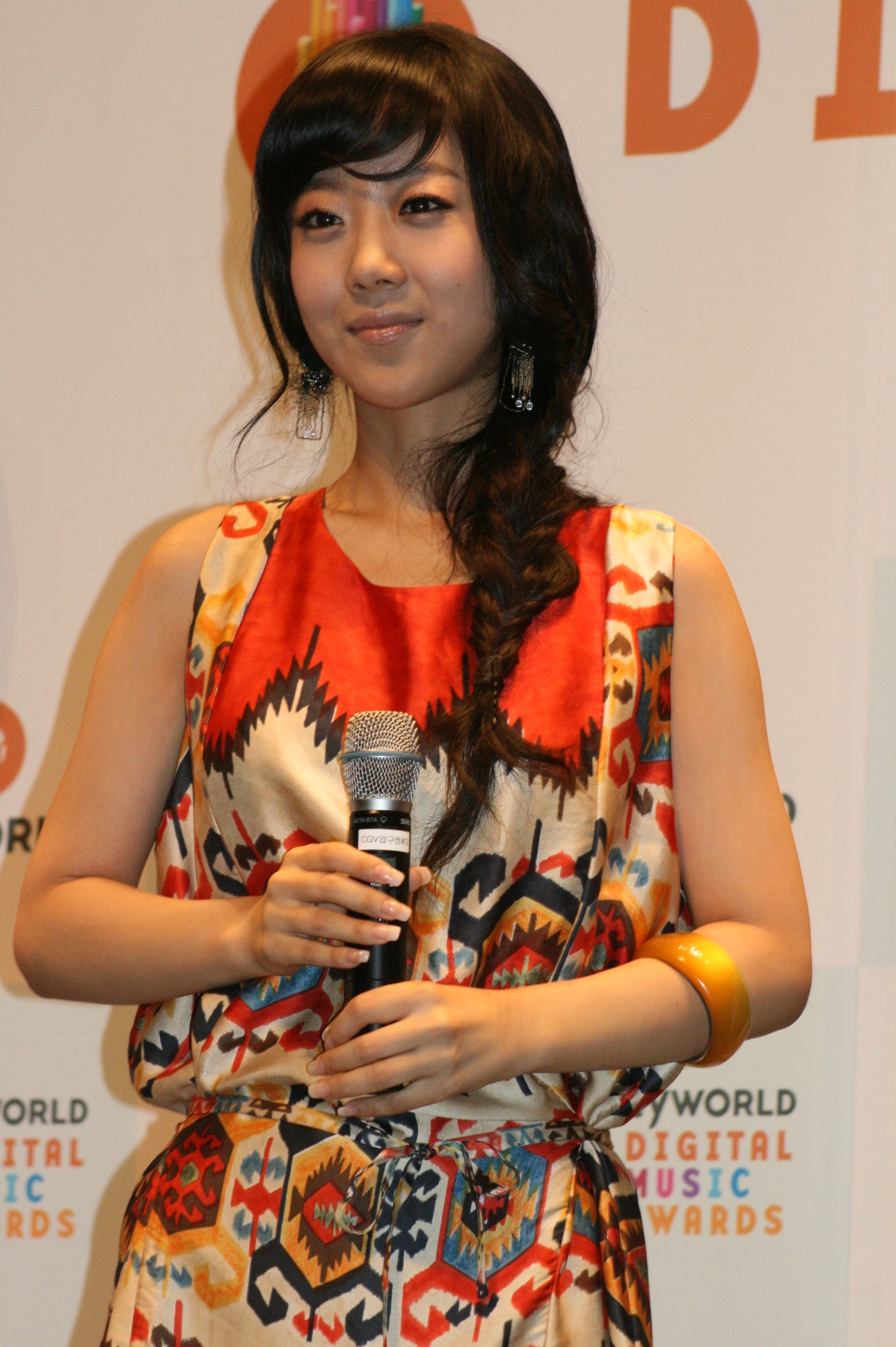
Yangpa won Best Ballad Performer

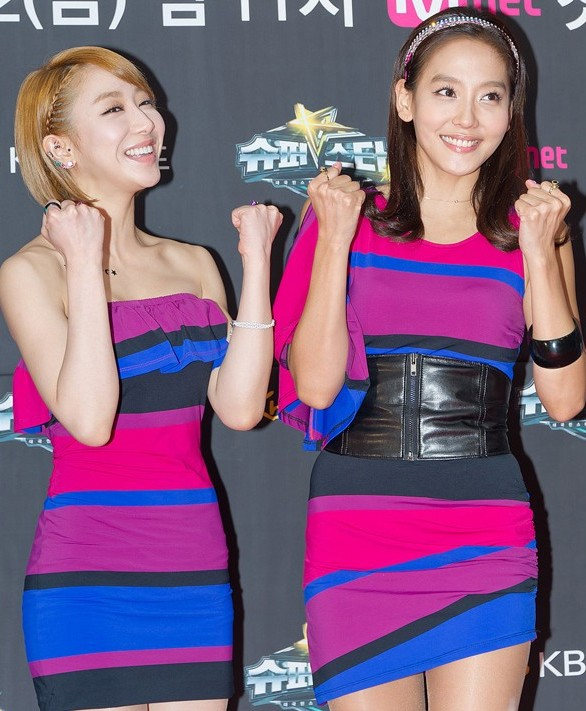
The Grace won Best Dance Performers

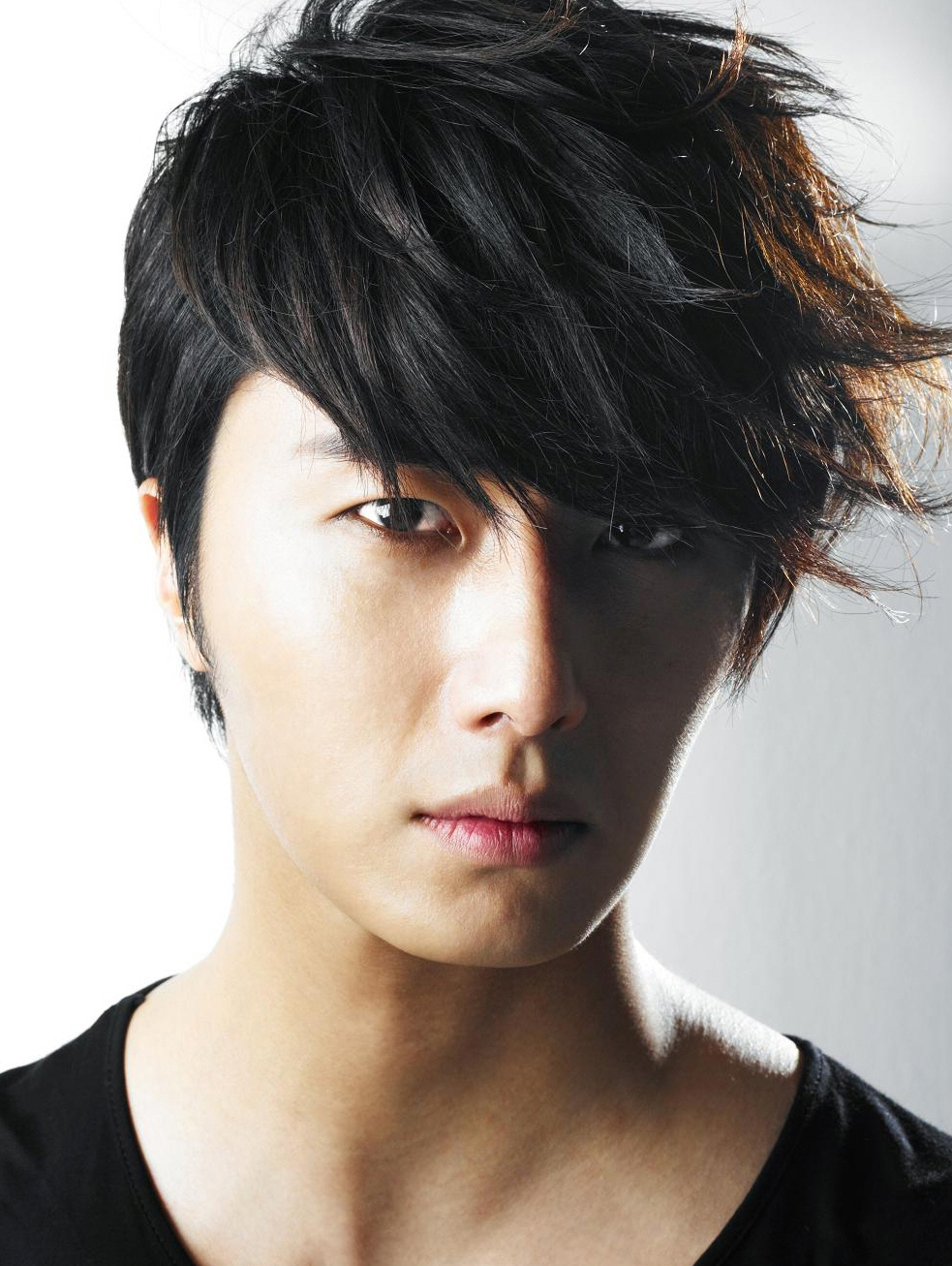
Jung Il-woo won Best Music Video Actor (with Baek Sung-hyun)

The following criteria for winners include:

Preference by Professional Research Organizations	20%
Viewers' Vote via the Internet Mobile	20%
Professional Jury Screening	20%
Record Sales	20%
Album Sales	10%
Integrated Digital Sales Chart	10%
Nominations Selection Committee Score	10%
Total	100%

== Winners and nominees ==
Winners are listed first and highlighted in boldface.

Song of the Year (Daesang)	Artist of the Year (Daesang)
**Big Bang – "Lies"**; Yangpa – "Love... What Is It?"; Epik High – "Fan"; Ivy – "Sonata Of Temptation"; SG Wannabe – "Arirang"	**Super Junior**; Big Bang; Yangpa; Wonder Girls; SG Wannabe
Album of the Year (Daesang)	Best New Artist
**Epik High** – **Remapping the Human Soul**; Big Bang – Always; Yangpa – The Windows Of My Soul; Wonder Girls – The Wonder Years; SG Wannabe – The Sentimental Chord	**Younha** – **"Password 486"**; Min Hyo-rin – "Stars"; JJ – "Love Actually"; K.Will – "Left Heart"; Zia – "Voice Of Heaven"
Best New Male Group	Best New Female Group
**F.T. Island** – **"Love Sick"**; Battle – "Crash"; Supernova – "Hit"; Tachyon – "Feel Your Breeze"; T-max – "Blooming"	**Wonder Girls** – **"Irony"**; Kara – "Break It"; Black Pearl – "What Should I Do, I Like You" (좋은걸 어떡해); Girls' Generation – "Into the New World"; Baby Vox Re.V – "Shee"
Best Male Group	Best Female Group
**Big Bang** – **"Lies"**; Super Junior – "Don't Don"; Epik High – "Fan"; SG Wannabe – "Arirang"; SS501 – "4Chance"	**SeeYa** – **"Love Greeting"**; Brown Eyed Girls – "Oasis"; Big Mama – "Betrayal"; The Grace – "Once More, Ok?; LPG – "Princess Of Sea"
Best House & Electronic	Best Dance Performance
**Clazziquai** – **"Lover Boy"**; Banana Girl – "Chocolate"; House Rulez – "Do It"; Humming Urban Stereo – "Baby Love"; Lexy – "Above The Sky"	**The Grace – "One More Time, OK?"**; Seo In-Young – "I Want You"; Super Junior – "Don't Don"; Ivy – "Sonata Of Temptation"; Lee Min-woo (M) – "Stomp"
Best Male Artist	Best Female Artist
**Lee Seung-gi** – **"White Lie"**; Park Hyo-shin – "Memories Resembles Love" (추억은 사랑을 닮아); Shin Hye-sung – "The First Person"; Eru – "Because We Are Two"; Lee Juck – "It's Fortunate"	**Ivy** – **"Sonata of Temptation"**; Baek Ji-young – "I Only Need One Love"; Yangpa – "Love... What Is It?"; Lee Hyori – "Toc Toc Toc"; Chae Yeon – "My Love"
Best R&B Performance	Best Rock Performance
**SG Wannabe** – **"Arirang"**; Bobby Kim – "Bluebird"; Wheesung – "Love Is Delicious"; Fly to the Sky – "My Angel"; Yoon Mi-rae – "Have You Forgotten?"	**Cherry Filter** – **"Feel It"**; No Brain – "That Is Youth"; TransFixion – "Get Show"; Pia – "Black Fish Swim"; Nell – "It's Okay"
Best Hip Hop Performance	Best Ballad Performance
**Epik High** – **"Fan"**; Leessang – "Ballerino" ft. Ali; Big Bang – "Lies"; Drunken Tiger – "8:45 Heaven"; Dynamic Duo – "Attendance Check"	**Yangpa** – **"Love... What Is It"**; Kim Dong-wan – "Handkerchief"; Shin Hye-sung – "The First Person"; Lee Ki-chan – "Beautiful Woman"; MC the Max – "Stop My Heart"
Music Video Acting	Best Music Video
**Jung Il-woo and Baek Sung-hyun** ("오죽했으면" by Goodbye Sadness 구정현); no nominees announced	**Dynamic Duo** – **"Attendance Check" (출첵)**; Kim Sa-rang – "Consolation"; Leessang – "Ballerino" ft. Ali; Miro Band – "mAMA"; Dynamic Duo – "Complex"
Best Mixed Group
**Clazziquai** – **"Lover Boy"**; Turtles – "It's Been A Long Time"; Rumble Fish – "Smile Again"; Cherry Filter – "Feel It"; Typhoon – "Only You"

=== Special awards ===
- Auction Netizen Popularity Award: **Super Junior** – **"Don't Don"**
- Foreign Viewers' Choice Award: **Shinhwa** – **"Once In A Lifetime"**
- Mnet.com Award: **F.T. Island**
- Mobile Popularity Award: **Super Junior** – **"Don't Don"**
- MKMF Tribute Award: **Insooni**

== Multiple nominations and awards ==
=== Artist(s) with multiple wins ===
The following artist(s) received two or more wins (excluding the special awards):

Awards	Artist(s)
2	Big Bang
2	Epik High
2	Clazziquai

=== Artist(s) with multiple nominations ===
The following artist(s) received two or more nominations:

Nominations	Artist(s)
5	Big Bang
5	Yangpa
5	SG Wannabe
4	Epik High
3	Ivy
3	Super Junior
3	Wonder Girls
3	Dynamic Duo
2	The Grace
2	Clazziquai
2	Shin Hye-sung
2	Cherry Filter
2	Leessang
