= Black Pearl (South Korean group) =

South Korean girl group

- Origin: Seoul, South Korea
- Genres: K-pop; hip hop; R&B; dance-pop
- Years active: 2007–2012
- Label: Core Contents Media
- Past members: Nami; Hwi Eun; Young Joo; Jung Min; Mika

Black Pearl (Korean: 블랙펄) was a South Korean girl group that debuted in 2007. Their debut lineup consisted of Nami, Hwieun, Youngjoo, and Mika. In 2009, Mika left for personal reasons, and was replaced by new member Jungmin. When the group debuted in 2007, they were marketed as the next girl group to dominate charts alongside hitmakers of the such as Wonder Girls and Kara. They were also known to follow the steps of SG Wannabe, SeeYa, and M2M. They disbanded in 2012.

== History ==
=== Debut (2007) ===
On July 16, 2007, Black Pearl debuted on M! Countdown with their first single "What Should I Do, I Like You", with an R&B sound. Later, they released their second digital song called "Finally...It's You".

=== Multiple projects and collaborations (2008–2010) ===
In May 2008, members Nami and Young Joo were selected to participate in a special unit called Color Pink, alongside Lee Hae-ri, Kang Min-kyung of Davichi, Lee Bo-ram, and Kim Yeon-ji of SeeYa, who were all part of Core Contents Media at the time. They released the single "Blue Moon", which also anonymously featured Hyomin and Hahm Eun-jung prior to their debut in T-ara. They also released a collaboration with South Korean rapper Mario, called "Hateful Love", which was performed from November to December 2008. In 2010, Mika left the group for personal reasons. Later, she opened her own clothing line.

=== Gogossing (2010) ===
In 2010, Black Pearl released the song "Gogossing", which was promoted for four months on Mnet's M! Countdown. They were regarded as Core Contents Media's next big group, alongside labelmates Co-ed School and T-ara.

=== Hiatus & disbandment (2011–2012) ===
After their hit in the previous year, members focused on solo activities in 2011. Although Core Contents Media never made an official announcement, the group is considered effectively disbanded since 2012.

== Members ==
=== Final lineup ===
- Nami - (나미) – leader
- Hwieun - (휘은)
- Youngjoo - (영주)
- Jungmin - (중민)

=== Former ===
- Mika (미카)

== Discography ==
=== Extended plays ===
Title	Album details	Peak chart positions
Title	Album details	KOR
Gogossing	Released: July 5, 2010; Label: Core Contents Media; Formats: CD, digital download	8

=== Singles ===
Title	Year	Peak chart positions	Album
Title	Year	KOR	Album
As lead artist
"What Can I Do, I Like You" (좋은걸 어떡해)	2007	No data	Non-album single
"Finally...It's You" (결국...너잖아)	2007	No data	Gogossing
"Gogossing" (고고씽)	2010	47	Gogossing
Collaborations
"Blue Moon" with Davichi, SeeYa as Color Pink	2008	No data	Color Pink
