= Baby Love (album) =

Studio album by Humming Urban Stereo
- Released: 8 February 2007
- Genre: Pop; electronica; lounge; house; bossa nova; acid jazz
- Length: 58:57
- Language: English; Korean; Spanish
- Label: Pastel Music
- Producer: Lee Ji-rin

Humming Urban Stereo chronology
Purple Drop (2006)	Baby Love (2007)	Sparkle (2012)

Baby Love is the third studio album by Humming Urban Stereo (Korean: 허밍 어반 스테레오), a solo musical project by South Korean pop musician Lee Ji-rin, released on 8 February 2007 by independent record label Pastel Music. Created entirely by Lee, the album blends electronica, lounge, bossa nova and acid jazz, and features collaborations with vocalists including Humming Girl, Sinae, Ye Jin Cho of Lucite Tokki, as well as international artists Simone of D'Sound and Japanese Shibuya-kei artist Dahlia (Kaori). It also features narration by actress Choi Kang-hee, and a remix by Japanese chiptune band YMCK. The album marked a stylistic evolution from Lee's previous work, incorporating darker melodies and more complex jazz-influenced arrangements while maintaining the project's characteristic sweet, youthful and feminine aesthetic.

The album received positive reviews from critics, who praised its exotic sound and quirky, realistic lyrics, describing it as "completely different from the Korean pop music we've heard before." However, the track "Erotic Actress" generated controversy, leading to disputes with police and an adults-only rating for the album. Baby Love became Humming Urban Stereo's first charting album, reaching number 21 on the Music Industry Association of Korea monthly chart and number 93 on the year-end chart. The title track was nominated for Best House & Electronic at the 2007 Mnet KM Music Festival. The album's success helped establish Humming Urban Stereo as Pastel Music's most representative artist and contributed to defining the label's distinctive image in the Korean indie scene.

== Background and composition ==
"Triangular"
Once considered as a possible namesake for the album, "Triangular" exemplifies Baby Love's blend of electronica, house, lounge, bossa nova and acid jazz, showcasing Humming Urban Stereo's use of "darker" melodies within their signature style.

Humming Urban Stereo is a solo musical project created by Seoul musician Lee Ji-rin in 2004. After dropping out of a classical piano program because his interest in bossa nova and jazz didn't align with the curriculum, Lee began creating music using MIDI software that a friend installed on his computer. He spent his early 20s creating music in his bedroom as a hobby, and decided to release it publicly after completing five or six tracks. Wanting to distance the project from his personal identity, he held a naming contest among friends from an online Japanese music fan club and adopted the name "Humming Urban Stereo" (Korean: 허밍 어반 스테레오). Referring to his stage name, Lee told Story of Seoul: "I didn't like writing lyrics, so I wanted to make music with few lyrics. That's what humming is all about." He became involved in the Korean indie scene and self-published a 2004 EP that he sold on consignment at record shops in Sinchon, until it reached number one on an indie chart featured on singer Shin Hae-chul's radio program, leading to a record deal with independent label Pastel Music and the release of his official debut album, Very Very Nice! and Short Cake, in 2005. The album was an indie success and was followed by a second studio album, Purple Drop, and by the EP Monochrome, both released in 2006. Monochrome marked a stylistic shift with ballad-oriented tracks and achieved chart success alongside mainstream artists in what the label described as a "quiet revolution".

Humming Urban Stereo's music stood out on the Korean indie scene for its sweet, youthful and feminine sound, which combined various influences from Western popular music. Lee was entirely responsible for the composition, production and engineering of the project, but frequently called on female vocalists, including Humming Girl, Sinae and Yozoh. Baby Love expanded this collaborative approach with international guests, including Simone of the acid jazz band D*Note, who had previously contributed to Lee's second album, and Japanese Shibuya-kei artist Dahlia, with whom Lee had performed in a joint concert. The album also features vocals by Ye Jin Cho, member of the pop duo Lucite Tokki, and narration by actress Choi Kang-hee. When discussing Baby Love, the press often highlighted the contrast between the project's female vocalists and youthful sound—which they compared to the sensibility of teenage girls—and the fact that it was created by a single 27-year-old man. Interviewed by Topclass, Humming Urban Stereo "flustered the reporter" by claiming that some people called his songs "music for doenjang girls", adding jokingly: "Seeing that I need to be in a pretty cafe to get inspiration, I'm a doenjang guy too." Although he initially gave little importance to his lyrics, after his second album he decided to develop them more seriously, incorporating a more instinctive and straightforward language with influences from fictional works like films and comic books.

Musically, Baby Love is a pop album with a singular blend of electronica, house, lounge, bossa nova and acid jazz sounds. Developed concurrently with the Monochrome EP, it continued that release's musical direction while maintaining the sweet aesthetic characteristic of the project. With Baby Love, Lee attempted to make his sound more complex by making it less soft and sweet and incorporating more pronounced influences from bossa nova and jazz, while still maintaining his characteristic style. Tracks like "Dark Circle", "Ozon" and "Triangular" are representative of this use of "darker melodies", and were originally considered as titles for the album. "Triangular", which features Sinae, exemplifies this darker approach with realistic lyrics that deliberately move away from the project's typically soft sound. When discussing the album, Lee referred to Antônio Carlos Jobim as his greatest inspiration, stating: "When I listened to Jobim's music, I thought for the first time that no better music could come out. Someday I want to make such delicate and moving music too." The title track "Baby Love" is a duet between Lee and Humming Girl—who was studying in Japan at the time—and was conceived as a successor to the hit "Hawaiian Couple" from his previous album. The album also features a remix of "Hawaiian Couple" by Japanese chiptune band YMCK. "Mambo Mood" features Dahlia and blends mambo and bossa nova styles. Writing for The Chosun Ilbo's magazine Topclass, reporter Kwak So-kyung described the album's style as "decidedly exotic", combining sounds from electronic and lounge music with "lyrics that are hard to understand at once." She further noted that the lyrics are "quirky and fun instead of heavy and serious" and that they rely on "everyday, concrete words", resulting in an "excessively realistic content and free expression style".

== Release and reception ==
Baby Love was published on 8 February 2007 as a CD release. To accompany the album's release, a music video for the title track was published, featuring Lee alongside guest vocalist Humming Girl. In early March, Story of Seoul reporter Yoon So-jeong praised the album as "opening a golden age" for Humming Urban Stereo, noting that it was "already receiving a hot response" and that other reviewers were describing its music as "like a colorfully decorated girl's diary" and "sweetly dreamy." Also in March, Cine21 critic Park Hye-myung reviewed the album, noting that while some empty spots in sound mixing could be found throughout the album, it demonstrated that its unique blend of genres "can become good music through stylishness alone, without an auteurist aura." Yoon also noted that the album's track "Erotic Actress" had "received ratings as harmful to youth." Topclass magazine later reported that the album's lyrics led to disputes between company officials and the police, and it was subsequently rated adults-only (18+).

Several months after the release of Baby Love, the song "Hawaiian Couple" from his previous album became a hit after being featured in a bakery commercial, increasing the artist's popularity; it was also featured in the film My Love (Korean: 내 사랑) at the end of the year. In September 2007, Kwak So-kyung of Topclass reported that "each song on the album is receiving great response from young people with cute, bouncy lyrics and sensuous melodies." The reported described it as "completely different from the Korean pop music we've heard before" and praised its "sweet melodies that wrap around the ears and lyrics that are charming and detailed as if a close friend is chattering."

Baby Love became Humming Urban Stereo's first charting album, reaching number 21 on the Music Industry Association of Korea (MIAK) monthly sales chart with 2,890 units sold by 20 February. It later placed at number 93 on the annual sales chart with 7,496 units sold in 2007. At the 2007 edition of the Mnet KM Music Festival, the title track was nominated for the Best House & Electronic award. According to Billboard, Humming Urban Stereo built its fan base through the social network Cyworld, which allowed subscribers to use its songs as background music for their home pages, leading to solid sales; the hit "Hawaiian Couple" sold over 500,000 digital units in the site between early 2007 and May 2008.

In 2008, the Kyunghyang Shinmun identified Humming Urban Stereo as the most representative artist of Pastel Music—which it called one of Korea's most important indie labels—crediting the project with establishing the label's distinctive image through a sound that represented "early 2000s popular sensibility such as women in their 20s, Hongdae cafes, and doodle-style cartoons." The newspaper further noted: "The era when genres worked rigidly in the music market ended in the 1990s. After alternative music, the music market went the path of cross-breeding without being reorganized with another 'alternative,' and the Korean music market, where genre differentiation was not universal, created a unique style by accepting the cross-bred style of Anglo-American pop and rock. The fact that even when composing according to the latest overseas trends, they couldn't erase the 'K-pop-like feeling' was both the growth and limitation of K-pop. Korean popular music after 2000 was reorganized with the symmetry of mainstream idol groups and non-mainstream bands centered on the so-called Korean Wave, and in that process, support for the indie scene worked from an emotional perspective. In this process, Pastel Music's emergence and securing of popularity suggests that the current Korean popular music market is dominated by emotional preferences rather than genre or style."

== Track listing ==
All tracks are written by Lee Ji-rin.

No.	Title	Length
1.	"Dark Circle"	1:31
2.	"Rainbow"	4:06
3.	"Mambo Mood"	3:36
4.	"Triangular"	4:04
5.	"Space Loves Disco"	4:33
6.	"간이역"	2:58
7.	"Siempre, será un zorro"	4:39
8.	"Baby Love"	4:04
9.	"Insomnia"	4:45
10.	"Ozon"	5:21
11.	"지랄"	3:42
12.	"Waltz Sofa #3"	1:28
13.	"Erotic Actress"	6:52
14.	"Hawaiian Couple - YMCK Mix"	3:37
15.	"Mambo Mood - Bunny's Kid Scat Version"	3:35
Total length:		58:57

== Charts ==
Monthly chart performance for Baby Love
Chart (2007)	Position
South Korean Albums (MIAK)	21

Year-end chart performance for Baby Love
Chart (2007)	Position
South Korean Albums (MIAK)	93
