= YMCK =

Japanese chiptune band

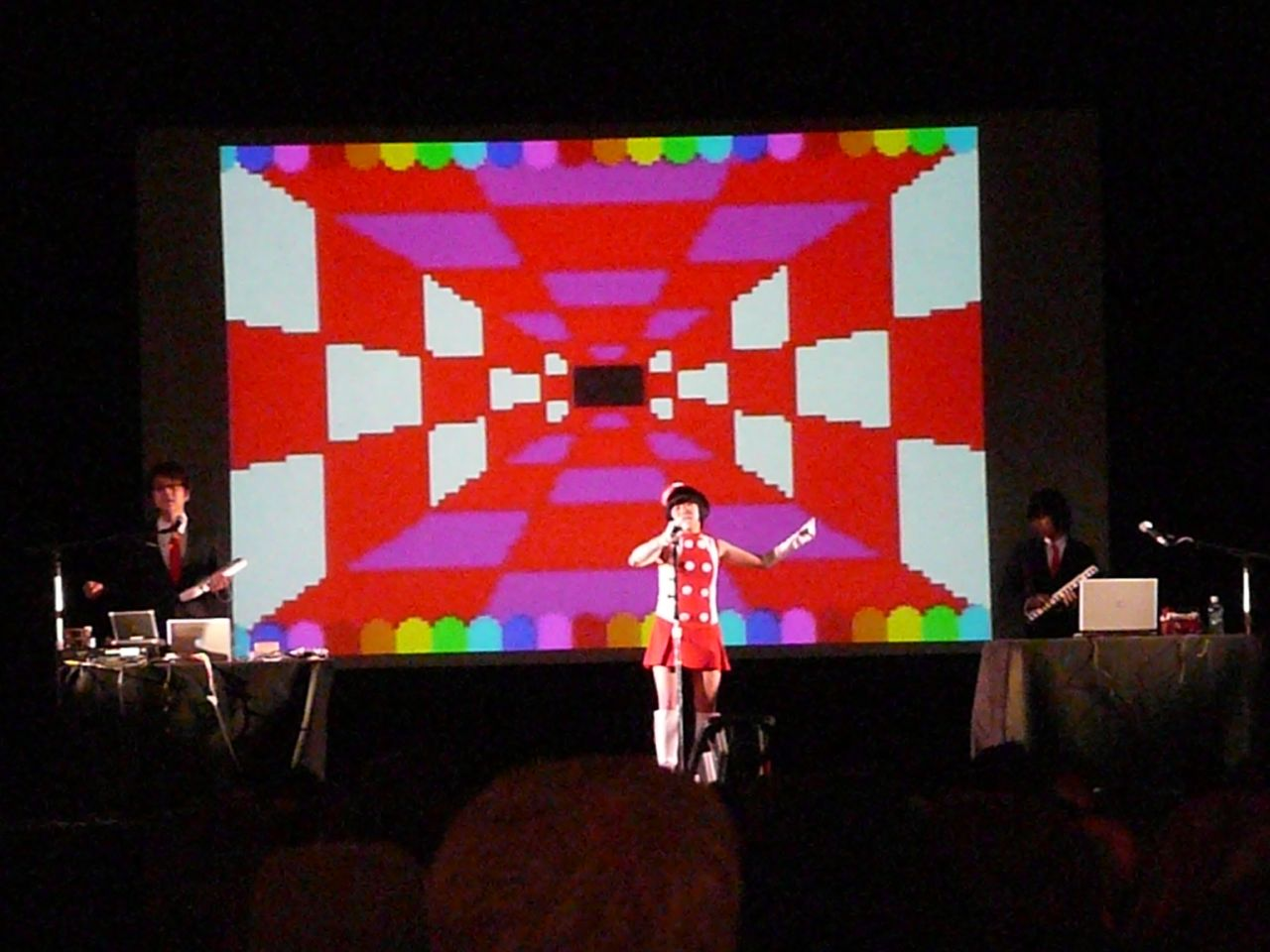
- YMCK performing in 2008

Background information
- Origin: Tokyo, Japan
- Genres: Chiptune, electropop
- Years active: 2003 – present
- Labels: Self-release (2003); Usagi-Chang Records (Japan, 2004-2008); Avex Group (Japan, 2008-2013) not records (Japan, 2013-present); Hyperwave (UK, 2017-present); Pastel Music (Korea) smallroom (Thailand); Records of the Damned (United States); Bishi Bishi (France)
- Members: Midori Kurihara (vocals); Takeshi Yokemura (music, lyrics, arrangement); Tomoyuki Nakamura (composition, music video)
- Website: Official Website

YMCK is a Japanese chiptune band, composed of Midori Kurihara (vocals), Takeshi Yokemura (music, lyrics, arrangement), and Tomoyuki Nakamura (composition, music video).

Their work has not been confined to Japan, having released albums in Korea, Thailand and the United States as well as appearing at various events around East Asia and Europe.

YMCK's name is derived from the CMYK subtractive color model.

== History ==
Digital avatars of the group members.

YMCK was formed in May 2003 when Kurihara joined Yokemura and Nakamura. They soon released their first work; a CD-R containing 6 tracks.

In 2004, YMCK appeared at Microdisko in Stockholm, Sweden. In the same year they released their first full album, Family Music.

In 2005, YMCK again appeared outside Japan, this time at the Formoz Festival in Taipei, Taiwan and at the Fat Festival in Bangkok, Thailand. This year also marks the first release of the Magical 8bit Plug, a synthesizer developed by Yokemura himself, motivated by frustration with the quality of game sounds available in the synthesizers used for Family Music. Now making use of the Magical 8bit Plug, they released their second album: Family Racing.

In 2006, they again appeared at the Formoz Festival in Taiwan.

In 2007, they collaborated in Humming Urban Stereo's third album Baby Love with a remix of their hit "Hawaiian Couple".

In 2008, YMCK released their third album Family Genesis, now under pop label Avex Trax, made available for the first time on the iTunes Store in the United States. Later that year and under the same label, they would release their first cover album, the YMCK Songbook, a collection of covers of Japanese music from the era before the NES.

In January 2009, they appeared in Sweden once again, this time at UppCon] in Uppsala, and also played in the opening ceremonies for Katsucon 15 in Arlington, Virginia (DC). In that same month they also released Family Cooking. In 2009, YMCK also remixed the No. 1 hit song Days by Japanese mega-star Ayumi Hamasaki.

During 2013, YMCK released Family Days, this time through not records. The theme of this album was said to be YMCK describing their own ordinary lives.

In 2015, they released Family Dancing.

In 2017, Family Swing was released, and for the first time they also released through Bandcamp, under U.K. chiptune label Hyperwave.

== Discography ==
Note: The English is not necessarily a direct translation of the Japanese. The English titles are taken from the English version of the website. For example, track one on "FAMILY RACING" was actually titled "FAMILY RACING" instead of "Opening" on the Japanese release.

=== Studio albums ===
FAMILY MUSIC (CD-R edition) (2003, self-released)

1. Opening
2. Pastel Colored Candy [パステル・キャンディーは悪魔のささやき]
3. Darling
4. Pow * Pow
5. Does John Coltrane Dream of a Merry-go-round? [ジョン・コルトレーンは回転木馬の夢を見るか]
6. Yellow, Magenta, Cyan and Black (Theme of YMCK) [Yellow, Magenta, Cyan and Black (YMCKのテーマ)]

Family Music (2004, Usagi-Chang (Japan)/Pastel (South Korea)/Records of the Damned (United States))

1. Fanfare [ファンファーレ]
2. Magical 8bit Tour
3. Pastel Colored Candy [パステル・キャンディーは悪魔のささやき]
4. Darling
5. POW * POW
6. Interlude
7. SOCOPOGOGO (YMCK Version)
8. Synchronicity
9. Tetrominon -From Russia with Blocks-
10. Does John Coltrane Dream of a Merry-go-round? [ジョン・コルトレーンは回転木馬の夢を見るか]
11. Yellow, Magenta, Cyan and Black (Theme from YMCK) [Yellow, Magenta, Cyan and Black (YMCKのテーマ)]
12. Your Quest is Over

Family Racing (2005, Usagi-Chang (Japan)/Pastel (South Korea)/smallroom (Thailand)

1. Opening [ファミリーレーシング]
2. Panic Racer 005 [パニックレーサー005]
3. Go YMCK, Go!
4. Come on! Swing all stars. [カモン！スウィングオールスターズ]
5. Rock'n Roll rendezvous feat. Takahashi Meijin [ロッケンロール･ランデブー featuring 高橋名人]
6. Sakana no Mabataki [魚のまばたき]
7. Milky Blue -Riddle In Wonderland- [Milky Blue ～不思議の国のリドル～]
8. Kira * Kira [キラ＊キラ]

Family Genesis (2008, avex Group (Japan)/Records of the Damned (United States))

1. Prologue [プロローグ]
2. Sabita Tobira no Dai 8 Tengoku [錆びた扉の第8天国]
3. Pleiades [プレアデス]
4. Starlight
5. Izukata no Fue [何方（いずかた）の笛]
6. Carving the Rock
7. Future Invasion [フューチャー・インヴェージョン]
8. Rain
9. System Reboot [システム・リブート]
10. Floor 99
11. Major Swing
12. 8 Ban me no Niji [8番目の虹]
13. Jidai Okure no Sora [時代遅れの空]
14. Finale ~Welcome to the 8-bit World~ [フィナーレ ～Welcome to the 8bit world～]

YMCK SONGBOOK: songs before 8bit (2008, avex Group (Japan) - Covers album; original artists listed in parentheses)

1. Yume no Naka e (Inoue Yosui)
2. Bokutachi no Shippai (Morita Doji)
3. Ningen Nante (Yoshida Takuro)
4. Kasa ga Nai (Inoue Yosui)
5. Shunkashuto (Izumiya Shigeru)
6. Manzoku Dekirukana (Endo Kenji)
7. Kotoba ni Dekinai (Oda Kazumasa)
8. Jinsei o Katarazu (Yoshida Takuro)
9. Marude Shojikimono no Yoni (Tomobe Masato)

Family Cooking (2009, Avex Group (Japan))

1. Omocha no Heitai no March [おもちゃの兵隊のマーチ]
2. Curry da yo! [カレーだよ！]
3. Sarada Shabadaba [サラダ・シャバダバ]
4. Mitsuboshi Chef no Uta [三ツ星シェフの歌]
5. Gourmet na Aitsu [グルメなアイツ]
6. Fuwafuwa Tamago no Omu Rice [ふわふわ卵のオムライス]
7. Kaerimichi, Bangohan [帰り道、晩ご飯]
8. Wonderful Chocolate [ワン！ダブル・チョコレート]
9. Ban Ban Cooking [バンバンクッキング]

Family Days (2013, not records (Japan))

1. Yozora Ha Machino
2. Sakaraigataki Unmei No Naka
3. Mirai No Natsumero (feat. P.O.P ORCHeSTRA)
4. Dot No Hibi
5. Neko Ni Kakomarete Kurashitai
6. Sasetsushite Usetsushite
7. Mata Aruki Dasu Tameni

Family Dancing (2015, not records (Japan))

1. Los Colors de la Vida
2. Neo Identity
3. Disko Kitsch
4. Time Bomb
5. Perfect Device
6. 52 Futures
7. Unity
8. You Can Be a Star

Family Swing (2017, not records (Japan))

1. National Anthem of Retrojuego
2. Glory in my hands (Theme song of YMCK the phantom thieves)
3. Emerald tact
4. Great mission Yeah-yeah
5. Teatime
6. Thrill me (Theme song of the swingers the phantom thieves)
7. Melancholic swingers
8. Slapstick car chase
9. Random parade
10. A world waits for me
11. Annoying swingers
12. Sound of music

Family Circus (2019, not records (Japan))

[Note: Some of the names listed are a direct translation as the official English Names couldn't be found. Those with a directly translated name will be marked with an asterisk (*) and have the original name beside it in parentheses separated by a line.]

1. *Welcome to the Circus | (サーカスへようこそ)
2. We're the Circus
3. *Secret Showtime | (秘密のショータイム)
4. *Mystery Clown | (迷宮ピエロ) [Note: This could be read as "Labyrinth Pierrot"]
5. *Millionaires' Roaring Laughter | (ミリオネアたちの高笑い)
6. *Dream | (夢)
7. Wild Wild Caravan
8. *Family Circus Theme | (ファミリーサーカスのテーマ)
9. Floor99 (Soichi Terada House Remix)
10. You Can Be A Star (パソコン音楽クラブ Go Go General MIDI Remix) [Note: This is a remix by パソコン音楽クラブ (Pasocom Music Club) ]

=== PiCTOBiTS ===
YMCK composed the music for the DSiWare downloadable puzzle game PiCTOBiTS, which features 8-bit music from Nintendo games.
