= Typhoon (South Korean band) =

South Korean hip-hop group

Typhoon (Korean: 타이푼) is a South Korean music group that debuted in 2006. Signed under Trifecta Entertainment, the same company as co-ed group Koyote, they were marketed as "the second Koyote". Their debut album, Troika, was selected as the best rookie album of July 2006 by the Ministry of Culture and Tourism.

Due to Solbi's busy schedule in 2008, she was not able to participate in Typhoon's 3rd album Rendezvous, so therefore another female vocalist replaced her. However, this did not confirm Solbi's departure from the group, she was able to remain a member and work again when she was able to.

On January 30, 2009, Hana officially left the group after only 2 months. Singer Lee Kyung, who sang for the OST of MBC drama Wise Mothers and Good Wives, officially replaced her on February 6.

Typhoon disbanded in 2010, and reunited in 2017.

== Line-up ==
- Solbi (솔비, vocals) (2006–2010, 2017–present)
- Woo Jae (우재, vocals) (2006–2010, 2017–present)
- Ji Hwan (지환, rapper) (2006–2010, 2017–present)
- Lee Kyung (이경, vocals) (2009–2010)
- Hana (하나, vocals) (2008–2009)

== Discography ==
=== Albums ===
- Troika, May 2006
- Travel, July 2007
- Rendezvous, November 2008

== Awards ==
=== Mnet Asian Music Awards ===
Year	Category	Work	Result
2006	New Group of the Year	"So" (그래서)	Nominated
2007	Best Mixed Group	"Only You"	Nominated
