= Yangpa =

South Korean singer

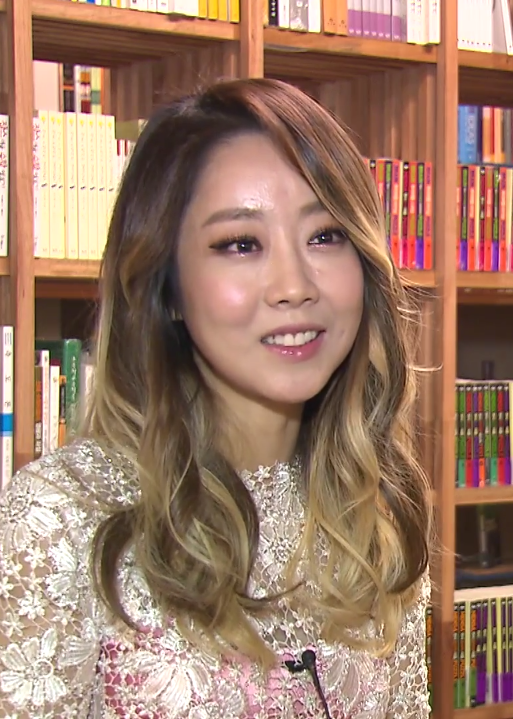
- Yangpa in 2016

Background information
- Born: Lee Eun-jin; March 17, 1979 (age 47); South Korea
- Genres: R&B; Ballad
- Occupation: Singer
- Years active: 1996–present
- Labels: milk & honey, New Order Entertainment
- Website: @yangpa_official Yangpa on Instagram

Korean name
- Hangul: 이은진
- Hanja: 李銀瑨
- RR: I Eunjin
- MR: I Ŭnjin

Lee Eun-jin (Korean: 이은진; born March 17, 1979), better known by her stage name Yangpa (Korean: 양파; lit. 'Onion'), is a South Korean singer. She debuted in 1996 with the hit single "Novice's Love."

== History ==
=== 1990s ===
Yangpa debuted in 1996 with the album Yangpa, which was the most successful album of her career. Her second album, YangPa Second Album, was moderately successful, as was her third album, yangpa 03.

=== 2000s ===
Although active at the beginning of the decade, Yangpa began to experience health issues, causing her to go on hiatus. She released an album in 2007 titled The Windows of My Soul and collaborated with the singer Miho, but her activities were short lived and she once again went on a break.

=== 2010s ===
In early 2011, it was announced that Yangpa had signed onto Core Contents Media and would be making her comeback after her four-year absence. Her EP Elegy Nouveau, which contained the self-composed tracks "Bon Appetit" and "그때 그 사람", was released on March 28, 2011. After the concept photos for the album were released, controversy aroused over whether or not the singer had gotten cosmetic surgery. Her agency initially denied the claims, but Yangpa stated in a later interview that she had had some work done.

Yangpa released the song "Sarangeun da Geureongeoraeyo" (Korean: 사랑은 다 그런거래요, "Love Is All the Same") featuring Davichi's Lee Haeri and F-ve Dolls member Han Na-Yeon (HANNA) on April 4, 2012, and announced that she would be releasing a new album titled Together. Shortly after the song's release, an alternative version of the song titled "Ibyeoreun da Geureongeoraeyo" (Korean: 이별은 다 그런거래요, "Parting Is All the Same") featuring Speed's Shin Jong Kook was released.

On October 22, 2016, Yangpa participated in Immortal Song 2 and won that broadcast with 435 points.

== Discography ==
=== Studio albums ===
Title	Album details	Peak chart positions	Sales
Title	Album details	KOR	Sales
Yangpa	Released: December 27, 1996; Label: Shinchon Music; Format: CD, cassette; Track listing: 1. 애송이의 사랑; 2. 비타민; 3. Forever With You (천사의 시); 4. Don't U want me 5. 괜찮아; 6. 뱀파이어; 7. Internet Girl (야후); 8. Heart Beat Away (애송이의 사랑)	No data	KOR: 820,000
YangPa Second Album	Released: January 9, 1998; Label: Shinchon Music; Format: CD, cassette; Track listing: 1. Intro; 2. Sweet 19 Funky (Blue Birthday); 3. 알고 싶어요!; 4. 소유; 5. Neverland; 6. 믿지 못할 세계; 7. Stay With Me; 8. That's Ok!; 9. 다시 우리 (duet with Kim Jo-han); 10. 소녀가... 소년에게...; 11. Overlap	No data	KOR: 320,000
yangpa 03	Released: June 23, 1999; Label: Woongjin Media; Format: CD, cassette; Track listing: 1. 그녀안의 나 2. 오늘만; 3. Addio; 4. 愛易不悲; 5. 나쁜혈통; 6. 평온; 7. 지구에서 보낸 한 철 8. 머뭇머뭇; 9. 그대 아니었다면 (duet with Lee Seung-Hwan); 10. 나비의 비행; 11. 요술공주; 12. Missing You	1	KOR: 429,560
Perfume	Released: March 30, 2001; Label: Sony Music; Format: CD, cassette; Track listing: 1. 고백; 2. Special Night; 3. 그대 없는 나 4. Daydreamer; 5. Deepest in Your Heart; 6. Drive; 7. My Song; 8. One Fine Day; 9. 님 10. 피안화; 11. 본능; 12. 불언	7	KOR: 299,361
The Windows of My Soul	Released: May 17, 2007; Label: Phantom Entertainment; Format: Digital download; Track listing: 1. Marry me 2. 나 때문에; 3. 사랑..그게 뭔데; 4. 한사람; 5. 그대를 알고; 6. Love Letter; 7. La vie en rose 8. 울지 않는 법 9. 기억해; 10. 잃어버린 시간을 찾아서; 11. 그녀를 버려요; 12. 친절하네요	23	KOR: 1,506

=== Compilation albums ===
Title	Album details	Peak chart positions	Sales
Title	Album details	KOR	Sales
A Letter From Berkeley	Released: December 29, 1999; Label: Woongjin Media; Format: CD, cassette; Track listing: 1. 다 알아요; 2. 애송이의 사랑; 3. Forever With You; 4. 알고 싶어요; 5. 소유; 6. Addio; 7. 그녀안의 나 8. 괜찮아; 9. Stay With Me; 10. 소녀가 소년에게; 11. 애이불비; 12. 그대 아니었다면 (with Lee Seung-Hwan); 13. 너를 지켜줄께 (with Lee Ji-hoon); 14. 미로; 15. Missing You; 16. Heart Beat Away; 17. 애송이의 사랑 (Inst.); 18. 알고 싶어요 (Inst.); 19. Addio (Inst.)	9	KOR: 158,171
The Best Album	Released: November 13, 2003; Label: Shinchon Music, Universal Music; Format: CD, cassette; Track listing: 1. 그대 없는 나 2. 소유; 3. Daydreamer; 4. Special Night; 5. My Song; 6. 나 가거든; 7. 피안화; 8. Addio; 9. 다 알아요; 10. 그녀안의 나 11. 알고 싶어요; 12. 애이불비; 13. 믿지 못할 세계; 14. 어쩔 수 없는 (feat. Kim Jo Han); 15. 애송이의 사랑; 16. Addio (Inst.); 17. 다 알아요 (Inst.)	17	KOR: 11,700

=== Extended plays ===
Title	Album details	Peak chart positions	Sales
Title	Album details	KOR	Sales
Elegy Nouveau	Released: March 28, 2011; Label: Core Contents Media; Format: CD, Digital download; Track listing: 1. 너라면 좋겠어; 2. 아파 아이야; 3. 그때 그 사람; 4. 본 아뻬띠 (Bon Appetit – 맛있게 드세요) (feat. Yoon Doo-joon); 5. 친구야; 6. 너라면 좋겠어 (Inst.); 7. 아파 아이야 (Inst.); 8. 그 때 그 사람 (Inst.); 9. 본 아뻬띠 (Bon Appetit – 맛있게 드세요) (Inst.); 10. 친구야 (Inst.)	9	KOR: 4,639
Together	Released: May 9, 2012; Label: Core Contents Media; Format: CD, Digital download; Track listing: 1. 알아요; 2. 사랑은 다 그런거래요; 3. 이별은 다 그런거래요; 4. My Love; 5. Wonderful Girl	11	KOR: 1,939

=== Singles ===
Title	Year	Peak chart positions	Album
Title	Year	KOR	Album
"Secret" (비밀은 어디에 있나요) with Miho	2008	No data	Secret
"Hurt" (아파 아이야)	2011	4	Elegy Nouveau
"Love Is All The Same" (사랑은 다 그런거래요) with Davichi & Hanna	2012	8	Together
"Parting Is All The Same" (이별은 다 그런거래요) with Shin Jong-kook	2012	36	Together
"I Know" (알아요) with Lee Bo-ram & Park So-yeon	2012	12	Together
"Glory Of Love" (선물)	2013	48	A Tribute To the Hitman, David Foster
"Come to Me" (나에게 온다) with Yoon Jong-shin	2013	79	Monthly Project June 2013
"L.O.V.E"	2014	18	Non-album single
"Hail to the Brightness"	2015	—	I Am Melody 3
"Trembling" (끌림)	2017	—	Non-album single
"From June to January" (6월부터 1월까지) with 015B	2018	—	The Legacy 03

=== Soundtrack appearances ===
Title	Year	Peak chart positions	Album
Title	Year	KOR	Album
"If I Leave (Clean & White)"	2001	No data	Empress Myeongseong OST
"A Bittersweet Life III"	2005	No data	A Bittersweet Life OST
"Ghost" (령혼)	2009	No data	Soul OST
"Can You Hear Me?"	2010	26	Tears of Heaven OST
"I'll Remember" (기억할게요)	2011	50	Deep Rooted Tree OST
"Love...What To Do?" (사랑...어떡하나요)	2012	13	A Gentleman's Dignity OST
"Beyond the Clouds" (태양은 가득히)	2014	49	Beyond the Clouds OST
"I'll Be There"	2015	—	Aima OST
"Aurora" (오로라)	2017	—	Man to Man OST
"A Memory In My Heart" (마음의 기록)	2020		Find Me in Your Memory OST
"The Most Ordinary Day" (보통의 꿈)	2020		Private Lives OST
"A Dazzling Season" (눈부신 계절)	2022		The Glory OST

== Awards ==
=== KBS Entertainment Awards ===
Year	Nominated work	Category	Result	Ref.
2018	Yangpa's Music Garden	New DJ of the Year Award	Won	

=== Mnet Asian Music Awards ===
Year	Nominee / work	Award	Result
1999	"Addio"	Best Female Artist	Nominated
2001	"Special Night"	Best Female Artist	Nominated
2007	"Love... What Is It?"	Best Female Artist	Nominated
2007	"Love... What Is It?"	Best Ballad Performance	Won
2007	"Love... What Is It?"	Artist of the Year	Nominated
2007	—N/a	Song of the Year	Nominated
2007	The Windows of My Soul	Album of the Year	Nominated
