= Pyeongchon Management High School =

South Korean public high school

- 평촌경영고등학교
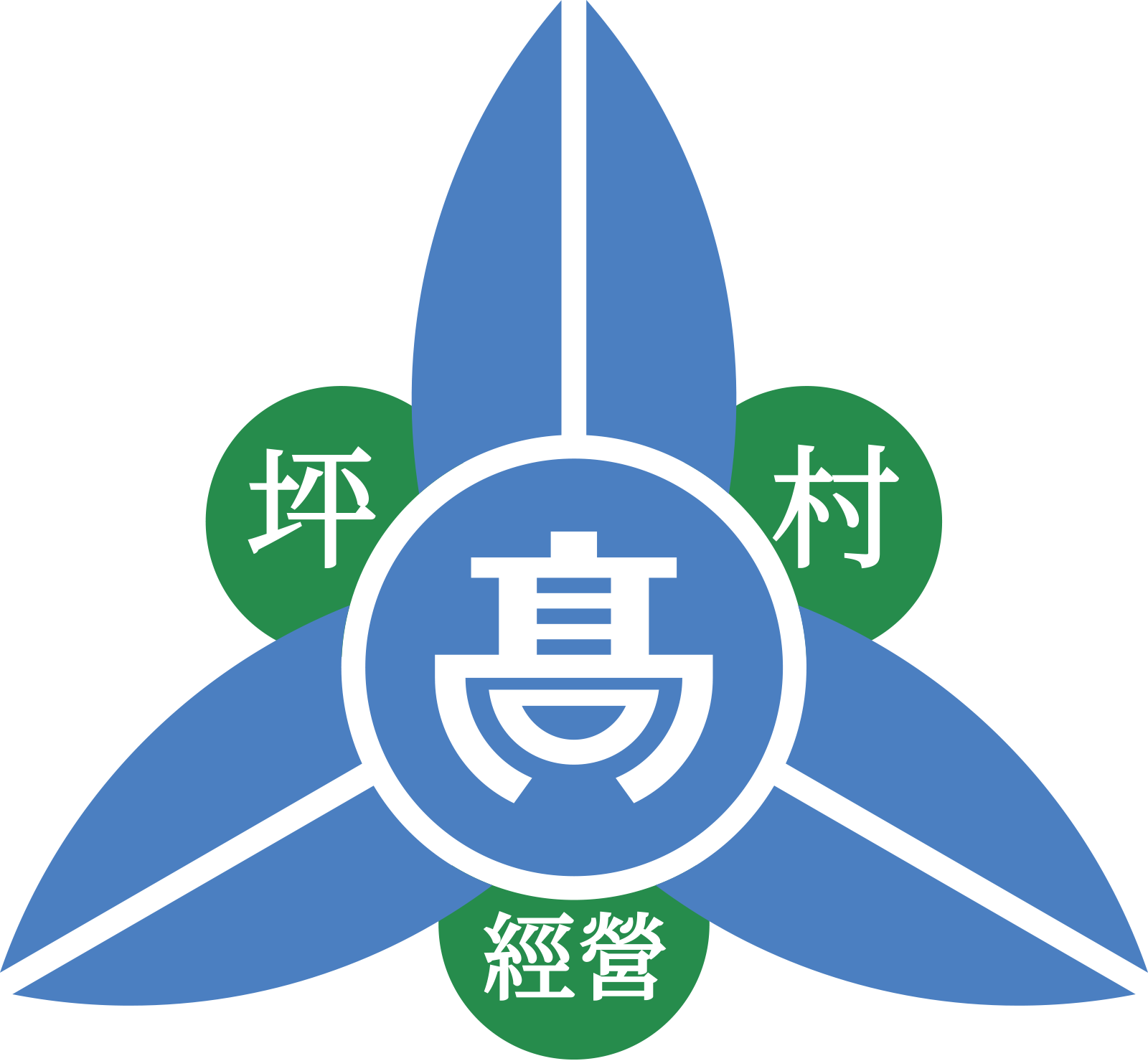

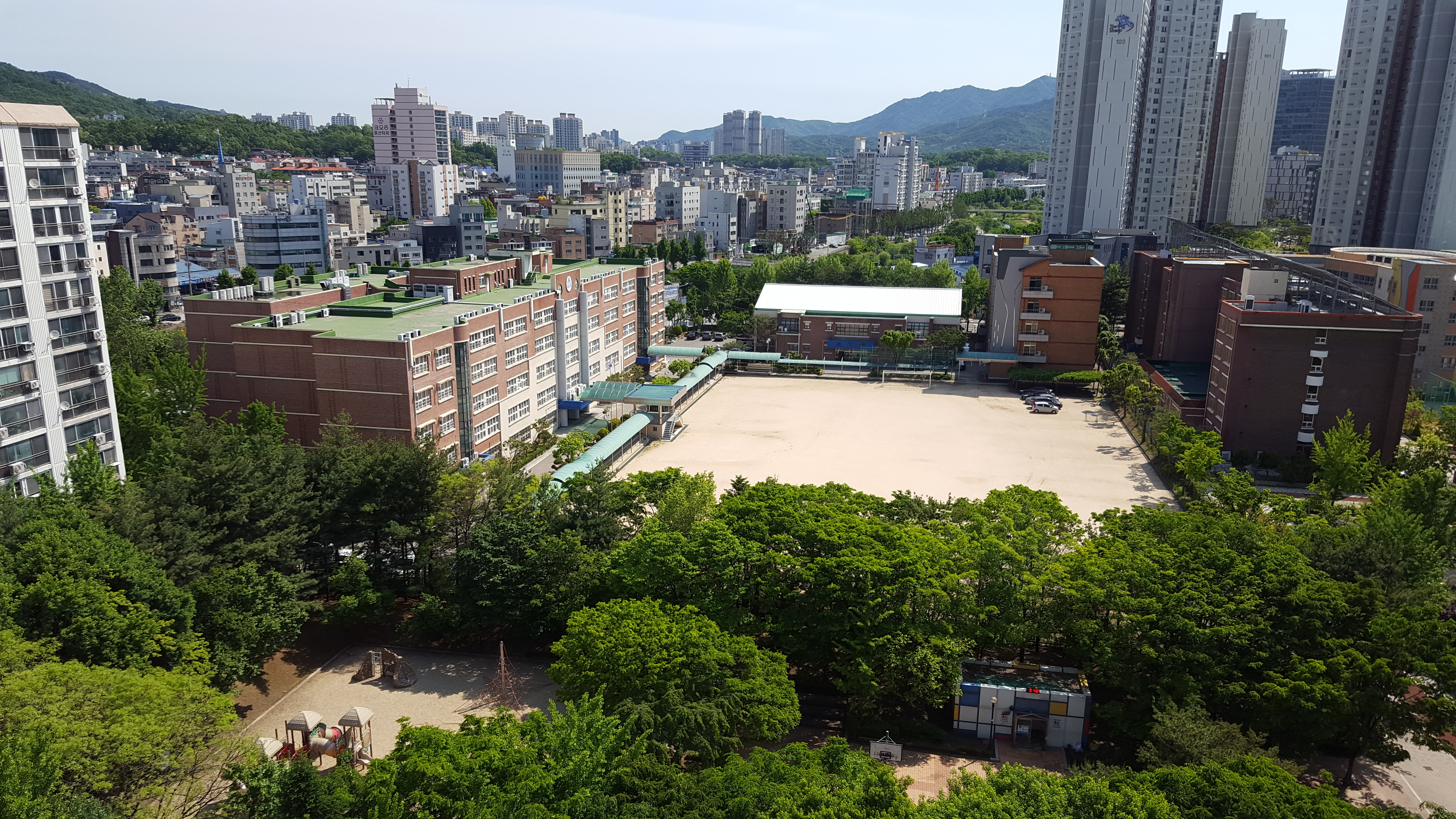
- Pyeongchon Management High School
- Anyang-si, Gyeonggi-do, 14050; South Korea

Information
- Type: Public
- Motto: Korean: 자율, 인화, 창조 (Autonomy, Harmony, Creation)
- Established: 1994; 32 years ago
- Principal: Kim Poonghwan
- Grades: 10–12
- Gender: Co-educational
- Enrollment: 693 (2023)
- Campus type: Urban
- Colour: Sky Blue
- Mascot: Pyeong-i, Gyeong-i
- Website: pcm-h.goeay.kr/pcm-h/main.do

- Pyeongchon Management High School
- Hangul: 평촌경영고등학교
- Hanja: 坪村經營高等學校
- RR: Pyeongchon gyeongyeong godeunghakgyo
- MR: P'yŏngch'on kyŏngyŏng kodŭnghakkyo

Pyeongchon Management High School is a public vocational high school, located in 186 Hagui-ro, Dongan-gu, Anyang, Gyeonggi, South Korea.

== Departments ==
- Department of AI Convergence (AI융합과)
- Department of Tourism and Foreign Language (관광외국어과)
- Department of Media Influencer (미디어인플루언서과)
- Department of Future Convergence Business (미래융합경영과)
- Department of Sports Industry Business (스포츠산업경영과)
- Department of Culinary Arts (외식조리과)
- Department of Wellness and Tourism (웰니스관광과)
- Department of Creative Design (크리에이티브디자인과)

== Notable alumni ==
- Kim Kuk-young
- Kim Yeon-ji
