= Lucite Tokki =

South Korean duo

- Origin: Seoul, South Korea
- Genres: Indie pop; synthpop; acoustic pop
- Years active: 2005–present
- Labels: Pastel Music; Rabbit Hole; Magic Strawberry Sound
- Members: Ye Jin Cho; Sun Young Kim
- Website: www.lucite-tokki.org

Lucite Tokki is a female pop duo formed in Seoul in 2005. The group consists of Sun Young Kim (guitar) and Ye Jin Cho (vocal). Both of them were born and raised in South Korea and majored in music. The duo moved to the U.S. in 2016, and now they are based in New York.

== Discography ==
=== Studio albums ===
Title	Album details	Peak chart positions
Title	Album details	KOR
Twinkle Twinkle	Released: December 6, 2007; Label: Pastel Music; Formats: CD, digital download; Track listing: 1. Wednesday (Piano Lesson); 2. in my tin case 3. December; 4. MI Re Do Ti; 5. Dream, Summer; 6. meet me in my dream 7. Rainy Day; 8. Drumming Bunny; 9. Rabbit and Terrapin; 10. Disco; 11. Spring, Spring, Spring; 12. Boys Don’t Cry(Hidden Track)	—
A Little Sparkle	Released: October 14, 2009; Label: Pastel Music; Formats: CD, digital download; Track listing: 1. Birthday; 2. The Song of Clumsy Witch; 3. Holding Hands; 4. For Me; 5. Driving; 6. B.I.S.H; 7. Letter to Arctic; 8. The Forgotten Story; 9. Christmas Carol; 10. Christmas Next Day; 11. Sweetest Loser(Hidden Track)	—
Grow To Glow	Released: July 10, 2012; Label: Magic Strawberry Sound; Formats: CD, digital download; Track listing: 1. The Way; 2. Free; 3. Go (GTG Version); 4. Noisy Childhood; 5. Vibes; 6. Summer (GTG Version); 7. I’m Here (GTG Version); 8. Last Night in My Dream; 9. Time to Grow; 10. Grow to Glow; 11. Time to Grow (Acoustic Piano Version)	—
L+	Released: March 25, 2016; Label: Magic Strawberry Sound; Formats: CD, digital download; Track listing: 1. Every You; 2. Wallflower (12db Mon Version); 3. Beautiful People; 4. In Your Arms; 5. You Who; 6. Pill Bugs (Remastered Version); 7. I, You (Remastered Version); 8. Everything But You; 9. Weekend Blues	68
"—" denotes album did not chart or was not released in that region.

=== Single albums ===
Title	Album details
Self	Released: March 17, 2011; Label: Magic Strawberry Sound; Formats: CD, digital download; Track listing: 1. go 2. thief 3. i'm here
Getting Through Winter with You	Released: January 24, 2014; Label: Magic Strawberry Sound; Formats: Digital download; Track listing: 1. Tibi; 2. Going Home
Love Letters	Released: July 17, 2015; Label: Magic Strawberry Sound; Formats: Digital download; Track listing: 1. Wallflower; 2. If I Were a Bird

=== Singles ===
Title	Year	Album
"Summer"	2011	Non-album singles
"Dear Deer"	2013	Non-album singles
"Sexy Tokki" with Sunwoo Jung-a	2013	Non-album singles
"Let Me Dance"	2014	Non-album singles
"Missing Girl" (사라진 소녀) with Yoon Jong-shin	2015	Step 2015 Yoon Jong-shin
"good"	2018	Non-album singles
"Not Yet"	2019	Non-album singles
"The Tree of May" (오월의 나무)	2019	Non-album singles

=== Soundtrack appearances ===
Title	Year	Album
"In My Tin Case"	2007	My Love OST
"Drumming Bunny" (북치는 토끼)	2008	Our Happy Ending OST
"Pitapat" (두근두근)	2009	Handphone OST
"The Last Song" (마지막 노래)	2011	My Princess OST

== Awards and nominations ==
Year	Award	Category	Nominated work	Result	Ref.
2009	Cyworld Digital Music Awards	Tam Eum Mania (October)	"B.I.S.H"	Won	
