= SeeYa =

South Korean girl group

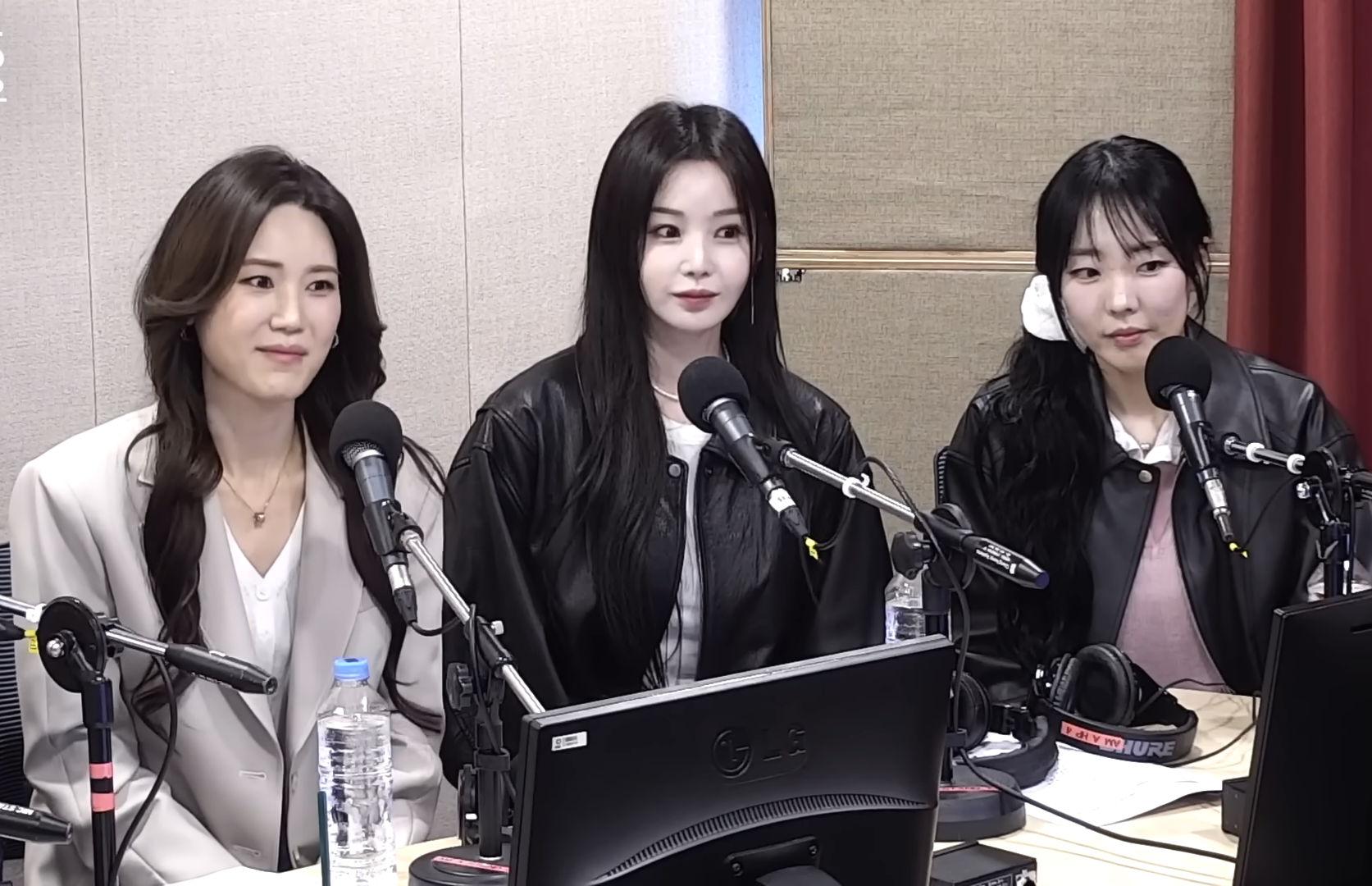
- SeeYa in April 2026; From L to R: Kim Yeon-ji, Nam Gyu-ri and Lee Bo-ram

Background information
- Origin: Seoul, South Korea
- Genres: K-pop; R&B; dance
- Years active: 2006–2011; 2020; 2026–present
- Labels: Mnet; Core Contents Media
- Members: Kim Yeon-ji; Lee Bo-ram; Nam Gyu-ri
- Past members: Lee Soo-mi

SeeYa (Hangul: 씨야) is a South Korean vocal trio consists of Kim Yeon-ji, Lee Bo-ram, and Nam Gyu-ri. Debuted in 2006, they were marketed as the female version of SG Wannabe.

SeeYa were known for their 2007 hit song "Love's Greetings", and won Best Female Group at the Mnet Asian Music Awards that same year. In 2009, Nam Gyu-ri left the group to pursue a solo career and Lee Soo-mi replaced her for only one year. The group later remained as a duo with Kim Yeon-ji and Lee Bo-ram prior to disbandment in 2011.

On March 12, 2026, the group (Kim Yeon-ji, Lee Bo-ram, Nam Gyu-ri) announced their return as a full group after 15 years to celebrate their 20th debut anniversary.

== History ==
=== 2006–2007: The First Mind, Lovely Sweet Heart and promoting ===
SeeYa's debut album, "The First Mind", was released on February 24, 2006, and was launched with the singles "A Woman's Scent" and "Shoes". The group also released a song for the soundtrack of drama The Invisible Man. SeeYa's first album was met with instant success in the Korean music industry. Their second album, "Lovely Sweet Heart", was released on May 25, 2007. The album sold over 81,00 copies in 2007, making it the fifth best-selling album in Korea that year. Their first single, "Love's Greeting", won awards at the 2007 Golden Disk Awards and the MKMF Awards.

=== 2008: California Dream and several collaborations ===
In January 2008, SeeYa released California Dream, an album which included songs that had been individually released as side-projects. Their album also included three new songs, including the single "Sad Footsteps", which was first released online in December 2007 and topped the charts. On January 31, SeeYa won the "Main Award" at the 2008 Seoul Music Awards. SeeYa collaborated with their label-mates Davichi and Black Pearl in May, creating a project group called Color Pink. The groups released a single together, which was entitled "Blue Moon." Seeya released their third album in September 2008 with an "electronica" song as the lead single, a contrast to the ballads the group had been known for. During promotions for the album, the group addressed the perception that the group was mainly a vehicle for raising Nam Gyu-ri's celebrity profile.

=== 2009: Nam Gyu-ri's departure, Lee Soomi joins Seeya, Rebloom ===
In April 2009, Core Contents Media announced that Nam Gyu-ri had stopped participating in the group's activities and that it might take legal action against her. Nam claimed that her contract was over and she was no longer bound to the company. A month after the controversy between Nam and the record label, SeeYa formed a project group with Davichi and T-ara to release the single "Women's Generation". During a press conference at the music video shoot for the song, SeeYa members Kim Yeon-ji and Lee Bo-ram acknowledged that they were disappointed by the manner of Nam's departure. Lee argued that the whole group revolved around Nam's wishes and emphasized that the members had received an advance for a contract of five years. "Women's Generation" topped the Korean mobile charts for four consecutive weeks, and was ranked #4 in mobile downloads for 2009. Core Contents Media announced that Nam had permanently left the group on August 13, 2009. Nam stated in a press release that she had left the group to focus on her acting career and had no intention of returning. SeeYa then began the search for a new member, and Nam was replaced by Lee Soo-mi. The group's first release after Lee Soomi joined was the EP Rebloom, which was released on October 28, 2009.

=== 2010–2011: Lee Soomi's departure, Nam Gyu-ri returns, See You Again, and disbandment ===
In January 2010, SeeYa teamed up with Davichi and T-ara once more for the release of the song "Wonder Woman". Several months later SeeYa released "Touch My Heart" for the soundtrack of the drama Personal Taste. In July, Core Contents Media announced that Lee Soo-mi would leave SeeYa to join the company's new group Coed School. SeeYa briefly continued as a duo made up of original members Kim Yeon-ji and Lee Bo-ram. In December 2010, Core Contents Media confirmed that SeeYa was going to disband after their next album release. The label claimed that the decision was made by the members, who wanted to go their separate ways. Kim Kwang Soo, the head of Core Contents Media, publicly called on Kim Yeon-ji to renew her contract with the label. However, some reports suggested that the label head's interview was a bad faith effort to hamper Kim Yeon-ji's future music career by making it more difficult for her to find a new label.

SeeYa released their final album on January 10, 2011. It was entitled See You Again, and contained two new songs. Nam Gyu-ri decided to join her former members for the final promotions as a group. SeeYa disbanded after a final performance as a trio, on January 30, 2011, at Inkigayo.

In November 2012, Core Contents Media debuted a new group based on SeeYa, named The SeeYa.

=== 2020: Brief reunion ===
The group (Nam Gyu-ri, Kim Yeon-ji, Lee Bo-ram) made an appearance on JTBC's Two Yoo Project Sugar Man Season 3 on February 21, 2020. Lee Bo-ram's agency then revealed that the group would make a comeback in 2020.

=== 2026–present: 20th debut anniversary reunion ===
On March 12, 2026, the group (Kim Yeon-ji, Lee Bo-ram, Nam Gyu-ri) announced that they would return as a full group to celebrate their 20th debut anniversary and revealed plans to pre-release a new song and fan meeting in March, as well as a full-length release in May. On March 16, 2026, the group officially announced their return to the music industry on March 30 with the release of their pre-release track "Nevertheless, We", followed by the release of the full album in May to begin full-scale activities. On March 20, 2026, the group announced through their social media that they will hold their first fan meeting titled 'RE:Bloom' at EDLS in Jongno-gu, Seoul, on March 30. On March 30, the group released their pre-release song "Nevertheless, We".On May 14, they released their fourth studio album First, Again, with contains of 11 tracks including "Nevertheless, We" and lead single "Stay".The group's member also revealed that they had founded their own label "SeeYa Entertainment" to support their reunion.

In June 2026, Seeya announced their nationwide concert, The Fan, would start in late August at Peace Hall of Kyung Hee University in Seoul.

== Discography ==
=== Studio albums ===
Title	Album details	Peak chart positions	Sales
Title	Album details	KOR	Sales
The First Mind	Released: February 24, 2006; Label: GM Contents Media; Formats: CD, cassette	5	KOR: 94,104
Lovely Sweet Heart	Released: May 25, 2007; Label: Mnet Media; Formats: CD, cassette	3	KOR: 81,723
California Dream	Released: January 2, 2008; Label: Mnet Media; Formats: CD, cassette	3	KOR: 22,352
Brilliant Change	Released: September 26, 2008; Label: Mnet Media; Formats: CD	23	KOR: 22,995
First, Again	Released: May 14, 2026; Label: SeeYa Entertainment; Formats: CD, digital download, streaming	—	—

=== Compilation albums ===
Title	Album details	Peak chart positions	Sales
Title	Album details	KOR	Sales
See You Again	Released: January 21, 2011; Label: Core Contents Media; Formats: CD, digital download	7	KOR: 5,192

=== Extended plays ===
Title	EP details	Peak chart positions
Title	EP details	KOR
Rebloom	Released: October 26, 2009; Label: Core Contents Media; Formats: CD, digital download	88*
*Peak chart position is from December 2009.

=== Singles ===
Title	Year	Peak chart positions	Album
Title	Year	KOR	Album
"Let's Meet Again"	2010	—	Non-album single
"My Heart Is Touched"	2010	—	Personal Taste (OST), Pt. 2
"I Must Be Crazy"	2010	—	Non-album single
"Still Here, Still Us" (그럼에도, 우린)	2026	164	First, Again
"Stay"	2026	164	First, Again
"—" denotes a recording that did not chart or was not released in that region.

=== Collaborations ===
Title	Year	Album
"바보" (with Lee Ji Hye)	2008	바보 (All Star 2집 Vol.4)
"Blue Moon" (with Davichi & Black Pearl)	2008	"Color Pink" (single)
"Women's Generation" (with Davichi & T-ara)	2009	"Women's Generation / Eternal Love" (single)
"Eternal Love" (with Davichi & T-ara)	2009	"Women's Generation / Eternal Love" (single)
"Wonder Women" (with Davichi & T-ara)	2010	Non-album singles
"Grown Up" (다 컸잖아) (with Davichi)	2010	Non-album singles

== Awards ==
Award	Year	Category	Nominated work	Result	Ref.
Asia Song Festival	2006	Best New Asian Artist	SeeYa	Won	
Golden Disc Awards	2006	New Artist Award	"Scent of a Woman"	Won	
Golden Disc Awards	2007	Digital Song Bonsang (Main Prize)	"Love's Greeting"	Won	
Korea Entertainment Art Awards	2006	Female Group Singer Award	SeeYa	Won	
Mnet Asian Music Awards	2006	Best OST	"Crazy Love Song"	Won	
Mnet Asian Music Awards	2007	Best Female Group	SeeYa	Won	
SBS Music Awards	2006	New Female Artist Award	SeeYa	Won	
Seoul Music Awards	2006	New Artist Award	SeeYa	Won	
Seoul Music Awards	2008	Bonsang (Main Prize)	SeeYa	Won	
