= Lee Bo-ram =

South Korean singer and actress (born 1987)

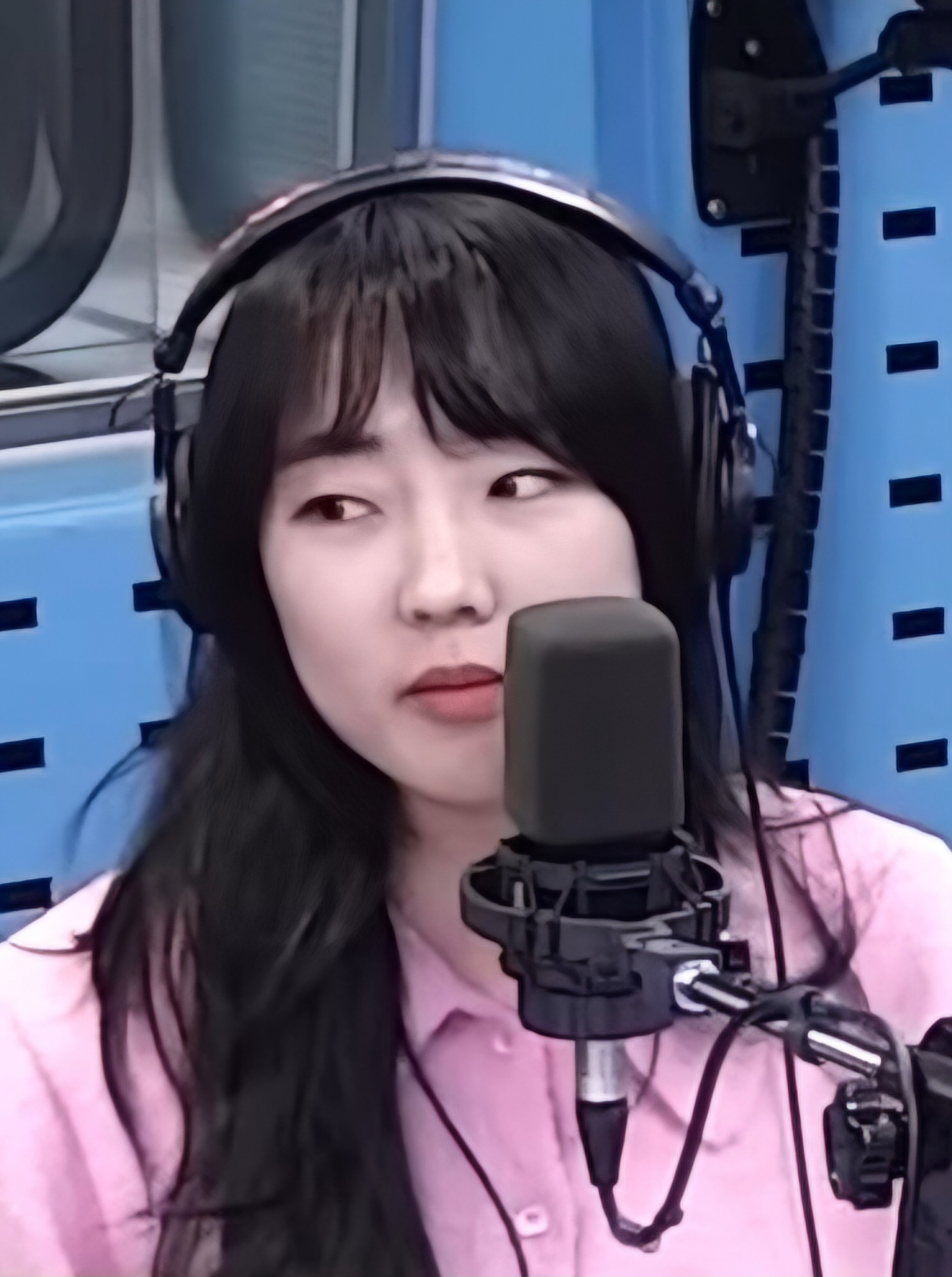
- Lee in 2023

Background information
- Born: February 17, 1987 (age 39); Seongnam, South Korea
- Genre: K-pop
- Occupations: Singer; actress
- Instrument: Vocals
- Years active: 2006–2012, 2017–present
- Member of: SeeYa
- Formerly of: 2Boram

Korean name
- Hangul: 이보람
- Hanja: 李寶藍
- RR: I Boram
- MR: I Poram

Lee Bo-ram (Korean: 이보람; born February 17, 1987) is a South Korean singer and actress. She is a member of girl group SeeYa. She joined the project group 2Boram in 2011. In July 2022, she debuted as a member of WSG Wannabe after joining MBC's Hangout with Yoo, as well as joining the sub-unit for the group Gaya-G. In March 12, 2026, she participates in SeeYa's 20th debut anniversary and active again as group member of SeeYa after 15 years.

== Discography ==
=== Extended plays ===
Title	Album details
Love... And So It Is (사랑은 스쳐가는 바람인가요)	Released: September 4, 2017; Label: Elistar Entertainment

=== Singles ===
Title	Year	Peak chart positions	Album
Title	Year	KOR	Album
"In the Room" (방안에서)	2011	60	Non-album singles
"2love" (as 2Boram, with Lee Bo-ram of Superstar K 2)	2011	58	Non-album singles
"I Know" (알아요) (with Yangpa, Park So-yeon)	2012	12	Together
"The One and Only" (엎질러진 물처럼)	2017	—	Love... And So It Is
"Miss You Because I Love You" (니가 보고 싶어)	2017	—	Love... And So It Is
"Spring And Spring" (봄 그리고 봄) (feat. Kanto)	2017	—	Love... And So It Is
"Miss You But Alone" (술이 생각나는 밤)	2017	—	Love... And So It Is
"Love... And So It Is" (사랑은 스쳐가는 바람인가요)	2017	—	Love... And So It Is
"Lonely Street" (텅빈 거리)	2017	—	Non-album singles
"Don't Go (화장을 하고) (with Kim Yeon-ji)	2018	—	Non-album singles
"Song of Rain" (비의 노래) (with Kim Yeon-ji)	2018	—	Non-album singles
"Lovely Wedding" (축가)	2018	—	Non-album singles
"Winter Love" (찬바람이 부니까)	2018	—	Non-album singles
"White Christmas" (하얀 크리스마스)	2018	—	Non-album singles
"Wanna Love" (너의 키스를)	2019	—	Non-album singles
"Look Good" (좋아보여)	2019	—	Non-album singles
"Memories of You and I" (그 때의 나, 그 때의 너)	2019	—	Non-album singles
"Great Day" (이렇게 좋은날)	2019	—	Non-album singles
"Wound" (흩어지는 중)	2019	—	Non-album singles
"Because I Love You (2021)" (사랑하니까 (2021))	2021	117	Non-album singles
"Dream" (한 밤의 꿈처럼)	2022	102	Non-album singles
"White Christmas" (크리스마스에는) (with Punch and Yebin)	2022	194	Non-album singles
"Brother" (형 (兄))	2024	191	Non-album singles
"Love, Always"	2024	—	Non-album singles
"For You" (당신을 위하여)	2025	112	Non-album singles
"—" denotes a recording that did not chart or was not released in that territory

=== Soundtrack appearances ===
Title	Year	Peak chart positions	Album
Title	Year	KOR	Album
"Back to the Beginning" (처음 그 자리에)	2004	—	Full House OST
"Red Bean II" (홍두 II)	2008	—	East Of Eden OST
"Coffee Over Milk" (우유보다 커피) (with Hyomin, Park Ji-yeon)	2010	74	Coffee House OST
"Painful" (아프다)	2017	—	The Secret of My Love OST
"One Day" (하루)	2018	—	The Ghost Detective OST
"Freak"	2020	—	Hyena OST
"Talking to the Moon"	2024	—	Good Partner OST
"—" denotes a recording that did not chart or was not released in that territory

== Filmography ==
=== Television series ===
Year	Title	Role	Ref.
2011	Miss Ripley	Jo Eun-bom	

=== Television shows ===
Year	Title	Role	Notes	Ref.
2017	King of Mask Singer	Contestant	as "Fountain Girl" (Episode 127)	
2019	King of Mask Singer	Contestant	as "Nightingale" (Episode 205-206, 208, 210, 212)	
2022	Hangout with Yoo	Cast member	as WSG Wannabe (Gaya-G) member	
2022	Immortal Songs: Singing the Legend	Performer	Episode 573	
2023	Immortal Songs: Singing the Legend	Performer	Episode 591, 592, 624	
2024	Immortal Songs: Singing the Legend	Performer	Episode 648	

== Musical ==
Year	Title	Ref.
2011	Falling for Eve	
2016	Love in the Rain	

== Awards and nominations ==
Name of the award ceremony, year presented, category, nominee of the award, and the result of the nomination
Award ceremony	Year	Category	Nominee / Work	Result	Ref.
MBC Entertainment Awards	2022	Special Award – Variety Category (Note: with Gaya-G Lee Bo-ram, Soyeon, Hynn and Jung Ji-so)	Hangout with Yoo	Won	
