= Lee Dae-hee =

South Korean footballer (born 1974)

Personal information
- Date of birth: 26 April 1974 (age 52)
- Height: 1.92 m (6 ft 4 in)
- Position: Goalkeeper

College career
Years	Team	Apps	(Gls)
1993–1996	Ajou University		

Senior career*
Years	Team	Apps	(Gls)
1997–1998	Bucheon SK	1	(0)
2001–2003	Pohang Steelers	0	(0)

International career
1994–1996	South Korea U23		
- * Club domestic league appearances and goals

Lee Dae-Hee (born 26 April 1974) is a South Korean former professional footballer who played as a goalkeeper.

== Club career ==
Lee joined Bucheon SKin 1993

He joined Pohang Steelers in 2001.

== International career ==
Lee was part of the South Korea squad at the 1996 Olympics tournament.
