= Solbi =

South Korean singer and painter

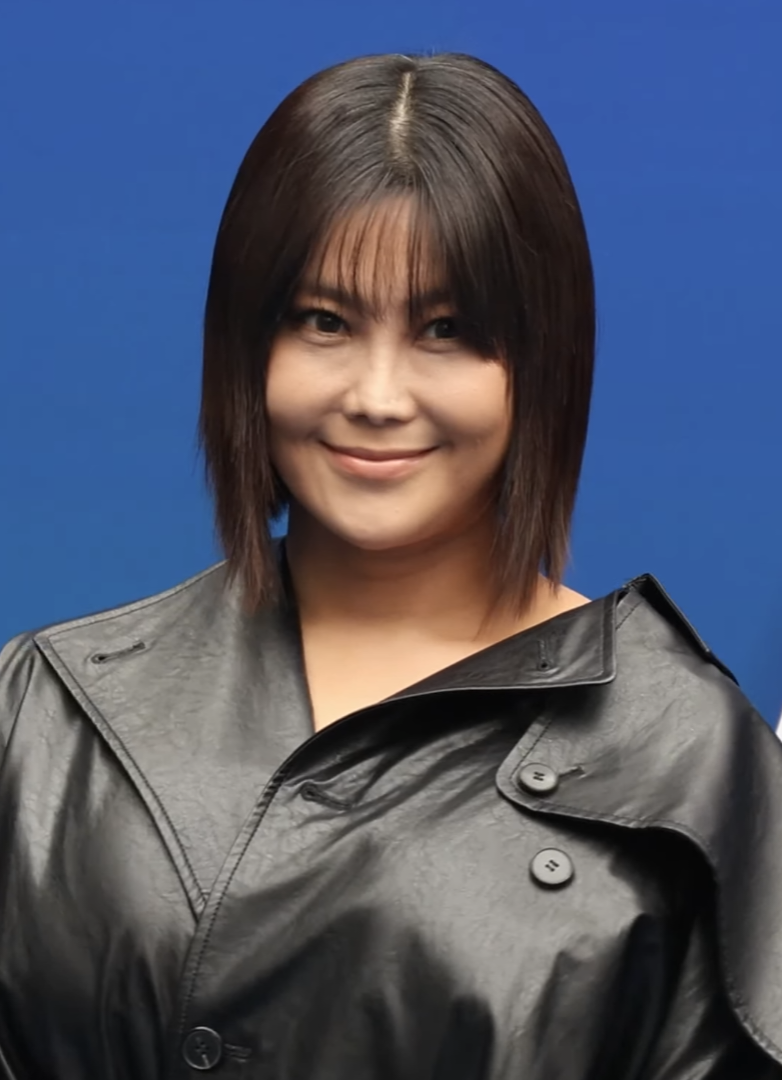
- Solbi in February 2026
- Born: Kwon Ji-an; 30 September 1984 (age 42)
- Occupations: Singer; painter; TV personality
- Years active: 2006–present
- Agent: jiancastle
- Musical career
- Genre: K-pop
- Formerly of: Typhoon

Korean name
- Hangul: 권지안
- Hanja: 權志晏
- RR: Gwon Jian
- MR: Kwŏn Chian
- Website: Official website Solbi on Instagram

Kwon Ji-an (Korean: 권지안; born 30 September 1984), commonly known by her stage name Solbi (솔비), is a South Korean singer, painter, and television personality. She made her singing debut in 2006 as a member of the K-pop group Typhoon, and gained widespread fame in 2008 as a cast member of the variety show We Got Married. She held her first solo exhibition as a painter in 2012. As an artist she presents a wide range of works including painting, sculpture, installation, performance art, and video art. She is an all-round artist active as a singer, television personality, visual artist, and writer.

== Career ==
=== Debut ===
She made her debut as the main vocalist of the representative K-pop hybrid group Typhoon in 2006 and also released her solo album ' Do It ' in 2008. In the same year, she also received attention in plays and musicals. Since then, she has been releasing music and music albums every year.

Aside from her music career, Solbi has also achieved fame as a television host on MBC, in the shows Sang Sang Plus (season 2) (alongside Lee Hyori and Shin Jung-hwan) and Music Core with Big Bang members Seung Ri and Dae Sung from March 2008 to March 2009, later replaced by Tiffany and Yuri of Girls' Generation. In February 2008, Solbi was cast in the reality show We Got Married, where celebrities are paired up to live together as newlyweds. Solbi was paired up with Hong Kyeong Min for the Lunar Special episode, but for the rest of the series her partner was Andy of Shinhwa.

On 19 June 2008 Solbi released her first solo digital single, titled 'Cute Love', the lyrics in which she composed herself. The song is used as Andy and Solbi's theme song for the show. On 15 July 2008 she recorded a Korean version of 'Way Back into Love' from the 2007 movie Music and Lyrics with Kim Jong Wook. Solbi's first mini album titled 'Do It, Do It' was released on 17 September 2008. Her second album, titled 'French Kiss' was released on 16 April 2009.

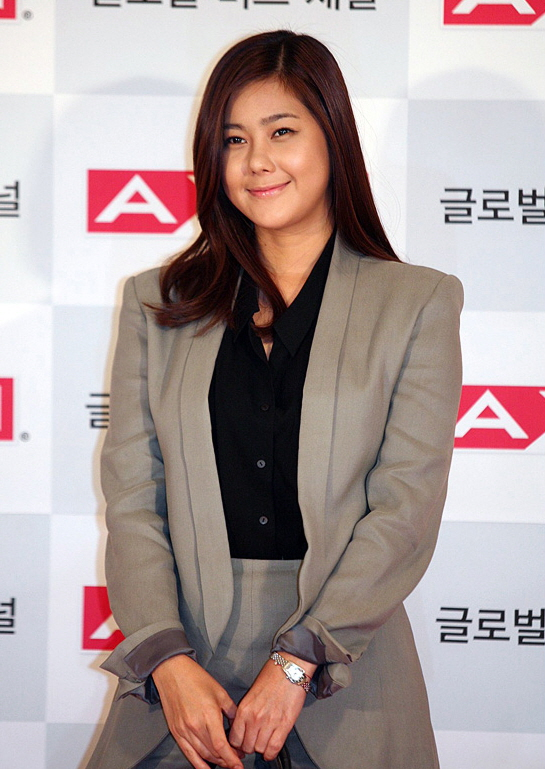
Solbi at AXN Korea launch event in 2011

Solbi appeared as one of the main MCs for Infinite Girls (season 2), but later stepped down, citing scheduling conflicts with her upcoming album. She participated program named Infinite Challenge in October 2015.

In 2017, she was appointed as an ambassador for the Central Election Commission. She was also a special guest teacher in Idol School, as a Psychological Health Management teacher using art therapy, the same outlet for herself when she was struggling.

=== A change from singer to artist ===
Solbi fully immersed herself in art, which she began in 2010 as a form of healing, and has since developed her abilities as a painter. She held her first solo exhibition in 2012.

Beginning in 2015 she introduced a working method she calls “self-collaboration.” The self-collaboration series comprises seven works: Trace — Daydream (2015), Black Swan (2016), Fiction & Non Fiction (presented at the Jikji Korea International Festival, 2016), Hyperism-Red (2017), Hyperism-Blue (2018), Hyperism-Violet (2019), and La nuit Blanche Paris — Violet.

Notably, Hyperism-Red, which centers on women’s wounds, shockingly staged a bold “Red” performance on KBS 2TV 'Music Bank'. In late 2018 she took an unusual approach by releasing the track “Class up” from Hyperism-Blue exclusively on her personal YouTube channel.

From late 2018 she actively pursued overseas exhibitions and tours. As a first step, in March 2019 she held a pop-up exhibition at Street Dream Gallery in Paris together with first-generation French street artist BANGGA. Following increased attention to Kwon Ji-an’s (Solbi’s) working method, she received numerous invitations; she was selected as a participating artist for the international art festival “2019 La nuit blanche PARIS” in October 2019, marking a milestone in her international career. She also performed a painting performance at the opening of the 2019 Gwangju Media Art Festival held at the Asia Culture Center in Gwangju — the first time a popular entertainer had performed on that stage.

In June 2019 she began her first overseas exhibition tour from Korea. She held her solo exhibition Real Reality: Uncomfortable Truth at Insa Art Center in Seoul, her first solo show in three years, and engaged in dialogue with visitors.

In December 2021 she received the top prize, the "Global Artist Award", at the Premi Internacional d’Art de Barcelona (PIAB21). Although the award sparked controversy, some critics defended the decision, arguing that an artist’s value should be judged by function rather than status.

In May 2022 she presented Systemic Language: Humming in New Jersey, USA, where she sublimated derisive online comments such as “Can she even paint an apple?” into her Apple series, receiving high praise. Jeannie Brasile, director and critic at the Seton Hall University Museum, praised the work: “Sometimes a cake is not a cake, an apple is not an apple, and a pop star can be a good artist.”

In September 2022 her solo exhibition Humming Paradise at the Print Bakery in the Vista Walkerhill Hotel received favorable reviews. More recently, she has focused on the Just A Cake series — works that emphasize the material properties of paraffin — which also garnered positive critical reception. The Humming and Apple series introduced at that exhibition were likewise well received.

Solbi uses art to process pain from cyberbullying. In a 2023 Voice of America documentary "Painting through pain" produced by Komeil Soheili, Solbi says: "In 2011, fake videos of me were distributed online, [...] At that time, many malicious comments were directed at me. And at some point, my persona became very shameful. [...] [Cyberbullying] is like a pack of wolves attacking one woman." Solbi said of her Solbi RED performance painting, "Through the performance, I wanted to box up the pain, move on, and live my life again."

She has continued to present high-quality works through solo shows, group exhibitions, and curated projects. In 2025 she held a solo exhibition at Tilsitt Gallery in Porto, Portugal, an invitational show organized by the gallery.

== Philanthropy ==
On March 8, 2022, Solbi donated ₩10 million to the Hope Bridge Disaster Relief Association to help those affected by the massive wildfires that started in Uljin, Gyeongbuk. and also spread to Samcheok, Gangwon.

In May 2022, Solbi donated 10 million won to the orphanage on Children's Day and Mother's Day By donating on 29 April 2022.

== Television appearances ==
- Golf Match Swing Star - Contestant (2023)
- Show Music Core
- We Got Married (Season 1), MBC, 2008
- Sunday Sunday Night – We Got Married, MBC, 2008
- Sang Sang Plus (Season 2), KBS, 2008
- Infinite Girls (Season 2), MBC, 2009–2010
- Law of the Jungle Episode 247-251, 2017
- Painting Through Pain (TV documentary series), VOA, 2023

== Discography ==
=== Extended plays ===
| Year | Title | Album details | Peak chart position | Sales |
| Year | Title | Album details | KOR | Sales |
|---|---|---|---|---|
| 2006 | 'Troika' | Typhoon 1st album | | |
| 2007 | 'Summer Remix' | Typhoon Special album | | |
| 2007 | 'I will wait' | Typhoon Single album | | |
| 2007 | 'Travel' | Typhoon 2nd album | | |
| 2008 | Do IT | released: 11 September 2009; Label: Kooking Music; Format: CD | — | —N/a |
| 2009 | Punished (벌 받을 거야) | Single album | | |
| 2012 | Solbi Is An Ottogi (솔비는 오뚜기) | Released: 23 August 2012; Label: Sony Music; Format: CD, digital download | — | —N/a |
| 2013 | Gone... (없다) | Digital single | | |
| 2014 | 31 Flavors of Me...Like Sweet Ice Cream (상큼한 아이스크림 같은 나는 31) | Released: 17 March 2014; Label: Sony Music; Format: CD, digital download | 73 | —N/a |
| 2014 | All i need is love (사랑 하나면 되는데) | Digital single | | |
| 2015 | Trace | Project Group VIVIS mini album | | |
| 2015 | To us (우리에겐) | Digital single | | |
| 2015 | First Love (첫사랑) | Digital single | | |
| 2016 | Find | Digital single | | |
| 2016 | Get back | Digital single | | |
| 2016 | Black Swan | Digital single | | |
| 2017 | Hand-Hug Mittens (손모아 장갑) | Solbi x Realsmell Digital single | | |
| 2017 | How about you (너는 어때) | Digital single | | |
| 2017 | Hyperism Red | Released: 18 May 2017; Label: Stone Music Entertainment; Format: CD, digital download; Mini album | — | —N/a |
| 2018 | 20068102 | Typhoon remake album | | |
| 2018 | Hyperism Blue | Digital single | | |
| 2019 | Hyperism Violet | Digital single | | |
| 2019 | Tears in the rain (눈물이 빗물되어) | Digital single | | |
| 2021 | Angel | Digital single | | |
| 2022 | I don't wanna break up (그대를 그리다) | Digital single | | |
| 2022 | soul-V | Solbi x VOID Digital single | | |
| 2023 | Airplane | Typhoon Digital single (a remake of Turtles' Airplane) | | |
| 2024 | Monday disco | Digital single | | |
| 2025 | Run away | 'Budding romance' OST | | |
| 2025 | Summer Dream(P.D.P) | Typhoon Digital single | | |

=== Singles ===
- Cute Love (digital single)
- Do It
- Always Together
- 부탁해요 (Please) (narration, with AWESOME!)
- White Kiss
- Love Escort
- 벌 받을 거야 (Punished)
- 어쩌죠 (What Should I Do?)
- 오뚜기 (Ottogi)
- 오늘도 난 원더풀 (Wonderful As Always)
- 블랙스완 (Black Swan)
- Get Back
- 파인드(Find)
- 너는 어때
- 하이퍼리즘-레드(Hyperism-Red)
- 하이퍼리즘-블루(Hyperism-Blue)
- Angel

== Exhibition ==
=== solo Exhibition ===
| year | contents |
|---|---|
| 2021 | Personal way of looking at the world, La Ville de Pins, Seoul, KR |
| 2021 | In another name, Desire, La Ville de Pins, Seoul, KR |
| 2015 | Trace, Gana Art Center, Seoul, KR |
| 2016 | Black Swan, Gallery AG, Seoul, KR |
| 2017 | Hyperism:Red, Gana Art Center, Seoul, KR |
| 2018 | Hyperism:Blue, VilaVilaCola, Gyeong-gi, KR |
| 2019 | Real Reality, Insaart Center, Seoul, KR |
| 2020 | Paradise - Capture of the Ordinary, VilaVilaCola, Gyeong-gi, KR |
| 2021 | Soul Washing, Gallery Now, Seoul, KR |
| 2021 | Just a Cake - Piece of Hope, Gallery Insaart, Seoul, KR |
| 2022 | Humming- Paradise, Print Bakery Walkerhill Flagship store, Seoul, KR |
| 2022 | Systemized Language:Humming, Paris Koh Fine Arts, New Jersey, USA |
| 2023 | Moi-meme, Gallery Chiro, Seoul, KR |
| 2025 | FLOWERS FROM HEAVEN, Space 776, Seoul, KR |
| 2025 | Humming Letter, Tilsitt Gallery, Portugal |
| 2025 | Rhythm of Language, Chungmundang, Daegu, KR |

=== Group Exhibition ===
| year | contents |
|---|---|
| 2012 | LOVE+CHERISH+KEEP, Coney Space Gallery, Seoul, KR |
| 2013 | New Happy Me , Chung-Ang University Hospital, Seoul, KR |
| 2014 | Art Chemistry, Ichiro Tsuruta Gallery, JPN |
| 2014 | Local Hope Fair, Kim Dae Jung Convention Center, Gwangju, KR |
| 2016 | Jikji Korea International Festival 'SNS World' Cheongju Arts Center, Cheongju, KR |
| 2016 | Seoul Modern Art Show, Hangaram Arts Center Museum, Seoul, KR |
| 2018 | What's your Class, COEX, Seoul, KR |
| 2018 | Contents Multi-Use, Pangyo Contents Multi-use Lab, Gyeong-gi, KR |
| 2018 | Hyperism:Red, MIAF, Myeongdong L7 Hotel, Seoul, KR |
| 2019 | Nuit Blanche Paris, Cité Internationale Universitaire de Paris, FR |
| 2019 | Gwangju Media Art Festival, Asia Culture Center, Gwangju, KR |
| 2019 | Kwon Jian X Banga, Gallery Street Dream, FR |
| 2019 | Do the right Thing, Glendale Library, USA |
| 2019 | Do the right Thing, National Assembly, Seoul, KR |
| 2019 | MEDIACITY, Yangpyeong Art Museum, Gyeong-gi, KR |
| 2019 | Special Exhibition on Women's Human Rights - Japanese Military Sexual Slavery in Contemporary Art, Gallery Yeongtong, Gyeong-gi, KR |
| 2019 | Special Exhibition on Women's Human Rights - Japanese Military Sexual Slavery in Contemporary Art, Dongtan Art Space, Gyeong-gi, KR |
| 2019 | Special Exhibition on Women's Human Rights - Japanese Military Sexual Slavery in Contemporary Art, Gunpo Culture & Arts Center, Gyeong-gi, KR |
| 2019 | Special Exhibition on Women's Human Rights - Japanese Military Sexual Slavery in Contemporary Art, Namdong Sorae Arts Hall, Incheon, KR |
| 2019 | 8th Glendale ‘Comfort Women Memorial’ Boeun Special Exhibition, Boeun Culture Center, Boeun, ChungCheongbuk-do, KR |
| 2021 | Utopia No.1 White, Gallery Chiro, Seoul, KR |
| 2021 | The March of Stories of Women’s Human Rights in Contemporary Art #Osan, Osan Museum of Art, Gyeong-gi, KR |
| 2021 | Color of Life : Focus Art Fair exhibition, Saatchi Gallery, UK |
| 2021 | Color of Life : Focus Art Fair exhibition, Fold Gallery, UK |
| 2021 | Color of Life : Focus Art Fair exhibition, Fitzrovia Gallery, UK |
| 2022 | Swiling, Gallery Chiro, Seoul, KR |
| 2022 | Systemized Apple, Gallery Chiro, Seoul, KR |
| 2024 | Yoon wee-dong x Kwon Jian 2person exhibition 'Endure', Gallery Banditrazos, Seoul, KR |
| 2024 | New Wave In The Blue Lake, Mokpo Coastal Ferry Terminal 1~4F, Mokpo, KR |
| 2024 | Cyberbullying, APY Gallery, Seoul, KR |
| 2024 | Cyberbullying, Sun Gallery, Seoul, KR |
| 2024 | Woman’s march, Pohang City Central Art Hall, Pohang |
| 2024 | Bbuck:on&off, Itaewon Process, Seoul, KR |
| 2024 | Cyberbullying, Artnoid178, Seoul, KR |
| 2024 | Mugunghwa. Flower of Infinity, Cheonan Museum of Art, Cheonan, KR |
| 2024 | SoHo’s Got Seoul, Parkwest Gallery, New York City, USA |
| 2024 | Yoon wee-dong x Kwon Jian x Park Jeongyong Normal nature, Gallery Banditrazos, Seoul, KR |
| 2024 | Survival Zone:BBuck on&off, Gyeonggi Art Center, Gyeonggi, KR |
| 2025 | Cyberbullying, National Assembly, Seoul, KR |
