= Kim Yeon-ji =

South Korean singer (born 1986)

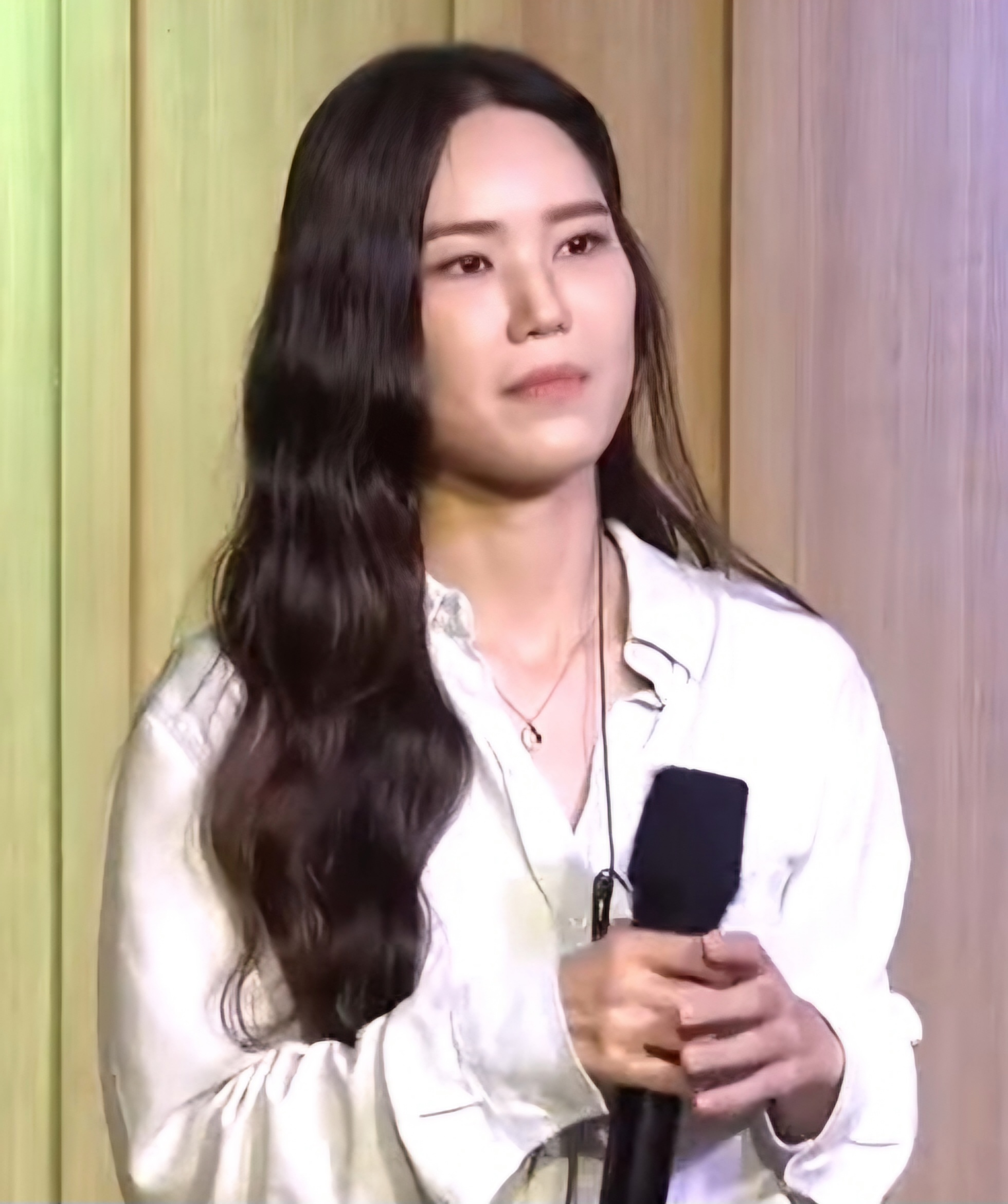
- Kim Yeon-ji in 2023.
- Born: October 30, 1986 (age 39); Anyang, Gyeonggi, South Korea
- Education: Kyung Hee University (Department of Postmodern Music)
- Occupation: Singer
- Years active: 2006–present
- Musical career
- Genres: K-pop; R&B; Ballad
- Instrument: Vocals
- Labels: Core Contents Media; Maroo; Most Works
- Member of: SeeYa

Korean name
- Hangul: 김연지
- Hanja: 金延智
- RR: Gim Yeonji
- MR: Kim Yŏnji

Kim Yeon-ji (Korean: 김연지; born October 30, 1986) is a South Korean singer. She was the lead vocalist of South Korean vocal group SeeYa until becoming a solo artist after SeeYa's disbandment in 2011. During her tenure with the group, Kim was noted for her dynamic vocal style and wide vocal range. On March 12, 2026, she participated in SeeYa's 20th debut anniversary reunion.

== Biography ==
Kim Yeonji was raised in Anyang, Gyeonggi in South Korea, where she attended Pyeongchon Management High School.

Yeonji entered the Postmodern Music Department at Kyung Hee University in 2008. Yeonji returned to Kyung Hee University's Postmodern Music Department as a full-time student in 2011, focusing on absorbing the department's orientation toward jazz, blues, and cross-cultural music.

In 2013, Yeonji graduated from Kyung Hee University with an unusually high GPA for an entertainment figure after having submitted a portfolio of musical arrangements and a thesis on the songs in which she had participated.

== Career ==
=== Predebut ===
Yeonji won awards in various singing and dancing talent contests and was eventually scouted by the record label and management company GM (currently MBK Entertainment). After more than a year of training under the label's auspices, Yeonji debuted as part of the K-pop Pop group SeeYa in 2006.

=== SeeYa (2006–2011, 2026–present) ===
Yeonji debuted as lead vocalist of the group SeeYa in 2006. The group officially disbanded on January 30, 2011, after the group final performance on Inkigayo.

On March 12, 2026, SeeYa's three members stated, "We have come together again with one heart for our fans to celebrate the meaningful year of SeeYa's 20th anniversary and Yeonji also participates in the current 20th debut anniversary reunion and restarts group activities after 15 years.

=== Solo career ===
At the end of 2011, Yeonji appeared during the 2011 SBS Drama Awards as actor Lee Jaeyoon's duet partner for a performance of the Lee So-ra song "Proposal." In early 2012, Yeonji contributed the song "Run" to the vocal music series M/Project, and the song "Love is Right" to the original soundtrack of the jTBC miniseries Padam Padam. In May 2012, the Modern K Music Academy, a prominent K-Pop "incubating" school, announced that Yeonji would be participating as an invited vocal instructor for its summer K-Pop training program in Vancouver, British Columbia, Canada. In March 2013, Lee Jinsung of Monday Kiz announced through Twitter that he had collaborated on a duet song with Yeonji, which he described as "memorable because it was work with a pure person who loves music so much." The song, "Hurting but Happy," was written and produced by Lee and released in March as a preview track from Monday Kiz's fifth LP album. Yeonji contributed the song "In My Eyes" to the SBS miniseries I Can Hear Your Voice (Korean: 너의 목소리가 들려; RR: Neoui Moksoriga Deulrye) in July 2013.

On March 12, 2026, it was officially announced that Kim would reunite with fellow SeeYa members Nam Gyu-ri and Lee Bo-ram to celebrate the group's 20th anniversary, marking her return to group activities after a 15-year hiatus.

== Discography ==
=== Singles ===
Title	Year	Peak chart positions	Sales (Digital)	Album
Title	Year	KOR	Sales (Digital)	Album
"The Day" (with JeA)	2006	—		To My Lover
"Let's Meet Again" (우리 다시 만나요)	2010	27		Non-album singles
"Run" (도망쳐)	2012	61	KOR: 151,814	Non-album singles
"Time Goes By" (시간아 흘러가라)	2012	—	KOR: 31,753	Non-album singles
"Hurting But Happy" (아파도 행복해) (with Monday Kiz)	2013	—		Non-album singles
"Woman's Age About 30" (여자나이 서른쯤)	2013	—	KOR: 15,615	Non-album singles
"Sad Day" (매일 이별)	2014	37	KOR: 68,025	Non-album singles
"Forgot" (잊었니)	2015	—	KOR: 16,456	Non-album singles
"Accidentally" (어쩌다)	2015	—	KOR: 32,777	Non-album singles
"The Untold Story" (꺼내지 못한 말) (with The One)	2015	40	KOR: 106,325	Non-album singles
"On a Spring Day" (봄날에) (with Huh Gak)	2016	—		Non-album singles
"All About You.." (너만 있으면 다였는데..)	2018	—		Non-album singles
"Don't Go" (화장을 하고) (with Lee Bo-ram)	2018	—		Non-album singles
"Song of Rain" (비의 노래) (with Lee Bo-ram)	2018	—		Non-album singles
"10 Years Without You" (10년이나 버티니)	2019	—		Non-album singles
"When the Wind Blows" (바람이 불면)	2020	—		Non-album singles
"Stay There" (가슴으로 운다)	2023	68		Non-album singles
"Lovely Sweet Heart" (사랑의 인사)	2023	129		Non-album singles
"You Can Cry When It Rains" (비가 오면 마음껏 울어도 되니까)	2023	185		Non-album singles
"Crazy Love Song" (미친 사랑의 노래) (with DK)	2023	51		Non-album singles
"Sad Day" (혼자 왔어요) (with DK)	2023	133		Non-album singles
"—" denotes release did not chart.

=== Soundtrack appearances ===
Title	Year	Album
"Crazy Woman" (with Lee Hae-ri and Lee Jung-min)	2008	East of Eden OST
"Love is Right" (사랑이 옳아요)	2012	Padam Padam OST
"In My Eyes"	2013	I Can Hear Your Voice OST
"Didn't Know Both Hearts" (두 마음을 알지 못했으니)	2014	Big Man OST
"Is It Love?" (우리 사랑인가요)	2015	Flower of Queen OST
"My Person" (내 사람)	2015	Songgot: The Piercer OST
"Once More" (한번 더)	2016	Monster OST
"Between Seasons" (계절사이)	2017	The Emperor: Owner of the Mask OST
"Do You Know" (아시나요)	2017	The King in Love OST
"Words Of Your Heart" (마음의 말)	2017	I'm Not a Robot OST
"Follow the Road" (이렇게 길 따라)	2018	Grand Prince OST
"When Our Eyes Met" (눈이 마주칠 때)	2018	Lawless Lawyer OST
"Voice" (목소리)	2018	Voice 2 OST
"With The Season" (계절을 담아)	2018	The Third Charm OST
"Paint" (물감)	2019	The Light in Your Eyes OST
"Victory"	2019	The Fiery Priest OST
"Cry" (feat. Sarah)	2019	I Wanna Hear Your Song OST
"Scar" (흉터)	2019	The Tale of Nokdu OST
"Mom" (내 맘)	2019	When the Camellia Blooms OST
"Whisky on the Rock"	2022	Our Blues OST

== Awards ==
Name of the award ceremony, year presented, category, nominee of the award, and the result of the nomination
Award ceremony	Year	Category	Nominee / Work	Result	Ref.
Newsis K-Expo	2022	Hallyu OST Award	Kim Yeon-ji	Won	
