= Humming Urban Stereo =

- Born: Lee Ji-rin; 1981 (age 44–45)
- Origin: South Korea
- Genres: K-indie; electropop; bossa nova; lounge; house
- Years active: 2004–present
- Labels: Pastel Music; WaltzSofa

Lee Ji-rin (Korean: 이지린; born 1981), better known as Humming Urban Stereo (Korean: 허밍 어반 스테레오) is a South Korean electropop singer-songwriter. The one-man band debuted in 2004 with the self-published extended play, Short Cake, which caught the attention of the Korean indie label Pastel Music and released a trilogy of studio albums: Very Very Nice! and Short Cake (2005), Purple Drop (2006) and Baby Love (2007), which became his first charting record. After several years of hiatus, he released his next album in 2012 and has since released six more albums. Guest vocalists, notably the late Lee Jin-hwa (aka Humming Girl) and Shina-E, have appeared on many of Humming Urban Stereo's songs.

== Career ==
Humming Urban Stereo's first album was Very Very Nice! and Short Cake, released in January 2005. Its most popular song, "Hawaiian Couple", a top ten hit that reportedly sold over 500.000 downloads, came from the band's second album, Purple Drop, released in March 2006. The song was also featured in My Love, a popular 2007 South Korean romantic comedy theatrical film directed by Lee Han.

In February 2007, the band released their third album, Baby Love.

In March 2012, the main female vocal "Humming Girl" Lee Jin-hwa died in Japan. Her cause of death was a heart disease. Lee Jin-hwa flew to Japan to study abroad in 2007 after singing for Humming Urban Stereo, and had been living alone since for six or seven years.

In 2013, Humming Urban Stereo came back with Sparkle, a studio album under Ji-rin's own label.

For the band's 10th anniversary, they released the album Reform, covering the band notable hits throughout their career such as "Scully Doesn't Know", "Insomnia", "Bullshit", "Salad Day" and their biggest hit "Hawaiian Couple" featuring guest vocals from mainstream artists such as G.Na, NS Yoon G, Narsha of Brown Eyed Girls, and Ashley of Ladies' Code.

== Discography ==
=== Studio albums ===
Title	Album details	Peak chart positions	Sales
Title	Album details	KOR	Sales
Very Very Nice! and Short Cake	Released: January 28, 2005; Label: Pastel Music; Format: CD, cassette	—	—N/a
Purple Drop	Released: March 14, 2006; Label: Pastel Music; Format: CD, cassette	—	—N/a
Baby Love	Released: February 8, 2007; Label: Pastel Music; Format: CD	21	KOR: 6,129
Sparkle	Released: November 29, 2012; Label: Waltzsofa Records; Format: CD, digital download	32	—N/a
V	Released: September 13, 2018; Label: Waltzsofa Records; Format: CD, digital download	92	—N/a
"—" denotes release did not chart.

=== Compilation albums ===
Title	Album details	Peak chart positions	Sales
Title	Album details	KOR	Sales
Sidekick	Released: August 21, 2014; Label: Waltzsofa Records; Format: CD, digital download	60	—N/a
Delicacy	Released: December 18, 2014; Label: Waltzsofa Records; Format: CD, digital download	53	—N/a

=== Extended plays ===
Title	Album details	Peak chart positions	Sales
Title	Album details	KOR	Sales
Short Cake	Released: February 15, 2004; Label: Pastel Music; Format: CD, cassette	—	—N/a
Monochrome	Released: October 30, 2006; Label: Pastel Music; Format: CD	47	KOR: 1,308
XXXX	Released: November 3, 2008; Label: Pastel Music; Format: CD	—	—N/a
Reform	Released: May 21, 2014; Label: Waltzsofa Records; Format: CD, digital download	37	—N/a
"—" denotes release did not chart.

== Awards and nominations ==
Year	Award	Category	Work	Result	Ref.
2007	Mnet Asian Music Awards	Best House & Electronic	"Baby Love"	Nominated	
