= Mnet Asian Music Awards in the Genre-Specific Awards Category =

Mnet Asian Music Awards in the Genre-Specific Awards category
- Country: South Korea
- Presented by: CJ E&M Pictures (Mnet)
- Website: Mnet Asian Music Awards

The following are the defunct titles in the Genre-Specific Awards Category given by the Mnet Asian Music Awards.

== Best Indie Performance ==
Year^{[I]}	Winner(s)	Song	Nominee(s)
1999 (1st)	No Brain	"Youth 98"	Dr. Core 911 - "Sha Sha Funky Shake" (샤샤 펑키 쉐이크); Dalpalan (DJ 달파란) - "휘파람별의 초대"; Blue Punk Bugs (푸펑충) - "어둠의 자식들"; 황신혜밴드 - "깡총"
2000 (2nd)	Crying Nut	"Circus Magic"	No Brain - "Songs for the Rioters" (청년폭도맹진가); Dr. Core 911 (닥터코어911) - "Rain" (비가); Lazy Bone (레이지본) - "큰푸른물"; MP Hip-Hop All Stars - "초"
2001 (3rd)	Crying Nut	"Deep in the Night"	3호선 버터 플라이 - "The Only Thing To Walk" (걷기만 해); No Brain - "Go To The Beach" (해변으로 가요); Rotten Apple - "Someone"; All Lies Band - "초인술퍼맨"
2002 (4th)	Trans Fixion	"Come Back to Me"	3rd Line Butterfly (3호선 버터플라이) - "Photosynthesis" (광합성); Lazy Bone - (레이지본) - "큰푸른물"; Sugar Donut - "책받침 아가씨"; Johnny Royal - "Regeneration" (갱생)

== Best House & Electronic ==
Year^{[I]}	Winner(s)	Song	Nominee(s)
2007 (9th)	Clazziquai	"Lover Boy"	Banana Girl - "Chocolate"; House Rulez - "Do It"; Humming Urban Stereo - "Baby Love"; Lexy - "Above The Sky"
2008 (10th)	Jewelry	"One More Time"	Gummy - "I'm Sorry" ft. T.O.P; Brown Eyed Girls - "Love"; Big Bang - "Haru Haru"; Uhm Jung-hwa - "Disco"
2009 (11th)	Brown Eyed Girls	"Abracadabra"	Son Dam-bi - "Saturday Night"; Clazziquai - "Love Again"; 4Minute - "Muzik"; G-Dragon - "Heartbreaker"

== Best Trot ==
Year^{[I]}	Winner(s)	Song	Nominee(s)
2009 (11th)	Hong Jin-young	"Love's Battery"	no nominees announced

== Best Digital Single ==
Year^{[I]}	Winner(s)	Song	Nominee(s)
2010 (12th)	Park Bom	"You and I"	Jeong Yeob - "Without You"; MC Mong - "Sick Enough to Die" (ft. Mellow); Monday Kiz - "Scatter"; Supreme Team - "Then Then Then" (ft. Youngjun)

== See also ==
- Mnet Asian Music Award for Best Rap Performance
- Mnet Asian Music Award for Best Dance Performance
- Mnet Asian Music Award for Best Band Performance
- Mnet Asian Music Award for Best Vocal Performance
- Mnet Asian Music Award for Best Ballad/R&B Performance - defunct

== Notes ==
^{^[I]} Each year is linked to the article about the Mnet Asian Music Awards held that year.
