= My Love (2007 film) =

- Theatrical release poster
- Hangul: 내 사랑
- RR: Nae sarang
- MR: Nae sarang
- Directed by: Lee Han
- Written by: Shin Dong-ik
- Produced by: Kim Sang-o
- Starring: Kam Woo-sung; Choi Kang-hee; Uhm Tae-woong; Jung Il-woo; Lee Yeon-hee; Ryu Seung-ryong; Im Jung-eun
- Cinematography: Lee Jun-kyu
- Edited by: Park Gok-ji
- Music by: Kim Sang-heon
- Distributed by: Showbox
- Release date: 18 December 2007
- Running time: 111 minutes
- Country: South Korea
- Language: Korean
- Box office: US$6.7 million

My Love (Korean: 내 사랑; RR: Nae sarang), also known as Love, First, is a 2007 South Korean film.

== Plot ==
Three couples and one single man experience the miracle of love during the Christmas season. Joo-won, who is prone to daydreams and flights of fancy, shares a loving relationship with her subway driver boyfriend Se-jin. College student So-hyeon falls in love with fellow student Ji-woo, and asks him for drinking lessons despite her inability to handle alcohol. Career woman Soo-jeong is attracted to widowed father Jeong-seok, though he continually rejects her advances. And oddball "free hug activist" Jin-man returns to Seoul hoping to meet his old girlfriend.

== Cast ==
- Kam Woo-sung as Se-jin
- Choi Kang-hee as Joo-won
- Uhm Tae-woong as Jin-man
- Jung Il-woo as Ji-woo
- Lee Yeon-hee as So-hyeon
- Ryu Seung-ryong as Jeong-seok
- Im Jung-eun as Soo-jeong
- Choi Jong-ryul as Traveler
- Seo Shin-ae as Hye-yeong
- Park Chang-ik as Ba-da
- Lee Jong-goo as Se-jin's superior
- Jo Moon-ee as Se-jin's co-worker
- Park Ji-ho as Blind date man
- Shin So-yul as Reporter
- Lee Han-wi (cameo)

== Release ==
My Love was released in South Korea on December 18, 2007, and on its opening weekend was ranked fifth at the box office with 182,097 admissions. The film went on to receive a total of 977,859 admissions nationwide, and as of February 3, 2008 had grossed a total of US$6,660,413.
