= Davichi discography =

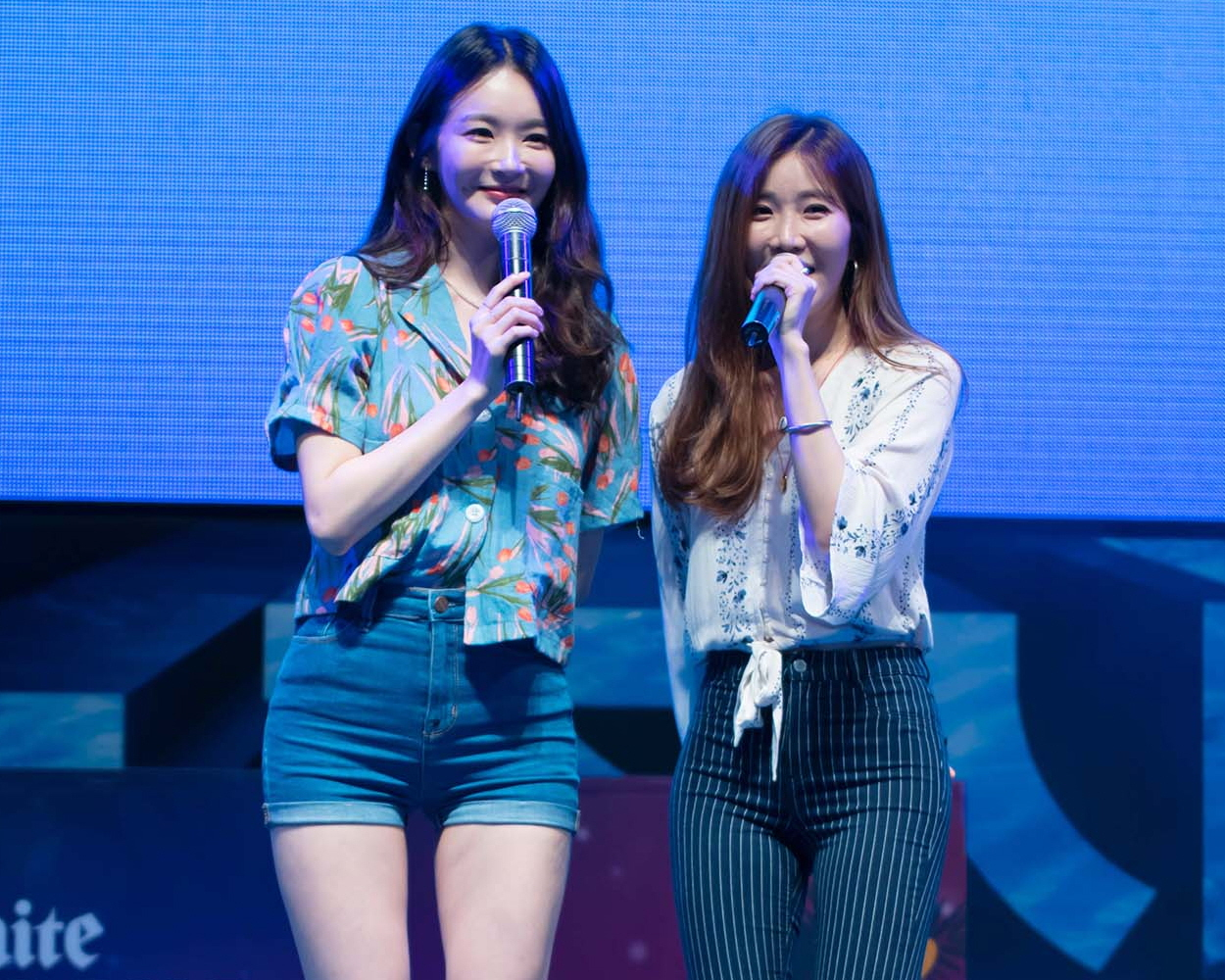
- Davichi at Ocean World Play Honorary Concert in July 2017
- Studio albums: 3
- Extended plays: 7
- Soundtrack albums: 21
- Singles: 38
- Collaborations: 8

The discography of the South Korean duo Davichi consists of three studio albums (one of which was re-released), seven extended plays, thirty-eight singles, eight collaborations and twenty-one soundtrack appearances.

== Studio albums ==
Title	Album details	Peak chart positions	Sales
Title	Album details	KOR (Note: The Gaon Chart was established in February 2010.)	Sales
Amaranth	Released: February 4, 2008; Re-released: July 7, 2008 (Vivid Summer Edition); Label: Core Contents Media; Formats: CD, digital download	12	KOR: 19,630
Mystic Ballad	Released: March 18, 2013; Label: Core Contents Media; Formats: CD, digital download	3	KOR: 17,046
&10	Released: January 25, 2018; Label: B2M Entertainment; Formats: CD, digital download	15	KOR: 3,420

== Extended plays ==
Title	Album details	Peak chart positions	Sales
Title	Album details	KOR	Sales
Davichi in Wonderland	Released: March 5, 2009; Label: Core Contents Media; Formats: CD, digital download	4	—N/a
Innocence	Released: May 6, 2010; Label: Core Contents Media; Formats: CD, digital download	4	KOR: 16,749
Love Delight	Released: August 29, 2011; Label: Core Contents Media; Formats: CD, digital download	3	KOR: 15,960
6,7	Released: June 19, 2014; Label: Core Contents Media; Formats: Digital download	—	—N/a
Davichi Hug	Released: January 21, 2015; Label: MMO Entertainment; Formats: CD, digital download	5	KOR: 7,448
50 x Half	Released: October 13, 2016; Label: B2M Entertainment; Formats: CD, digital download	9	KOR: 3,927
Season Note	Released: May 16, 2022; Label: Wake One; Formats: CD, digital download	48	—N/a
"—" denotes releases that did not chart.

== Singles ==
Title	Year	Peak chart positions		Sales (Note: The Gaon Chart stopped displaying the number of downloads from January 10, 2018.)	Certifications (Note: In April 2018, Gaon Chart introduced music recording certifications for albums, downloads and streamings.)	Album
Title	Year	KOR	KOR Hot	Sales	Certifications	Album
"I Love You Even Though I Hate You" (미워도 사랑하니까)	2008	*	*	—N/a	—N/a	Amaranth
"Sad Promise" (슬픈 다짐)	2008	*	*	—N/a	—N/a	Amaranth
"Sad Love Song" (슬픈 사랑의 노래)	2008	*	*	—N/a	—N/a	Amaranth
"Love and War" (사랑과 전쟁) (featuring Haha)	2008	*	*	—N/a	—N/a	Vivid Summer Edition
"8282"	2009	*	*	—N/a	—N/a	Davichi in Wonderland
"My Man"	2009	*	*	—N/a	—N/a	Davichi in Wonderland
"Time, Please Stop" (시간아 멈춰라)	2010	1	*	KOR: 2,676,554	—N/a	Innocence
"From Me to You" (난 너에게)	2010	3	*	KOR: 1,845,047	—N/a	Choo Young-soo All Star – Davichi
"Don't Say Goodbye" (안녕이라고 말하지마)	2011	1	1	KOR: 3,928,314	—N/a	Love Delight
"I'll Think of You" (생각날거야)	2012	2	2	KOR: 2,269,557	—N/a	Love Call with Davichi
"Do Men Cry" (남자도 우나요)	2012	2	4	KOR: 1,383,331	—N/a	The S Part 1
"Turtle" (거북이)	2013	1	2	KOR: 1,439,190	—N/a	Mystic Ballad
"Just Two of Us" (둘이서 한잔해)	2013	2	9	KOR: 778,673	—N/a	Mystic Ballad
"Be Warmed" (녹는 중) (featuring Verbal Jint)	2013	1	3	KOR: 1,316,544	—N/a	Mystic Ballad
"Missing You Today" (오늘따라 보고 싶어서 그래)	2013	2	1	KOR: 1,137,915	—N/a	Memories of Summer
"The Letter" (편지)	2013	1	1	KOR: 973,033	—N/a	Davichi Code
"Again" (헤어졌다 만났다)	2014	3	3	KOR: 744,994	—N/a	6,7
"Pillow" (팔베개)	2014	11	10	KOR: 306,089	—N/a	6,7
"Don't Move" (움직이지마)	2014	20	11	KOR: 269,345	—N/a	6,7
"Cry Again" (또 운다 또)	2015	1	*	KOR: 991,931	—N/a	Davichi Hug
"Sorry, I'm Happy" (행복해서 미안해)	2015	5	*	KOR: 553,816	—N/a	Davichi Hug
"Two Lovers" (두사랑) (featuring Mad Clown)	2015	2	*	KOR: 1,145,071	—N/a	Non-album single
"White" (화이트) (featuring Jay Park)	2015	7	*	KOR: 355,375	—N/a	D-Make
"Beside Me" (내 옆에 그대인 걸)	2016	3	*	KOR: 752,578	—N/a	50 x Half
"Love Is to Give" (받는 사랑이 주는 사랑에게)	2016	14	*	KOR: 277,226	—N/a	50 x Half
"To Me" (나에게 넌)	2017	11	*	KOR: 193,339	—N/a	Non-album single
"Days Without You" (너 없는 시간들)	2018	15	14	—N/a	—N/a	&10
"Nostalgia" (마치 우린 없었던 사이)	2018	24	—	—N/a	—N/a	Non-album singles
"Unspoken Words" (너에게 못했던 내 마지막 말은)	2019	2	52	—N/a	KMCA: Platinum (st.)	Non-album singles
"Dear." (나의 오랜 연인에게)	2019	5	—	—N/a	—N/a	Non-album singles
"Just Hug Me" (그냥 안아달란 말야)	2021	8	—	—N/a	—N/a	Non-album singles
"Looking at Photos" (사진을 보다가)	2021	48	—	—N/a	—N/a	Revibe Vol.2
"First Loss" (나의 첫사랑)	2021	14	—	—N/a	—N/a	Non-album singles
"Everyday Christmas" (매일 크리스마스)	2021	10	28	—N/a	—N/a	Non-album singles
"Fanfare" (팡파레)	2022	29	—N/a	—N/a	—N/a	Season Note
"A Very Personal Story" (지극히 사적인 얘기)	2023	56	—N/a	—N/a	—N/a	Non-album singles
"I'll Be by Your Side" (너의 편이 돼 줄게)	2024	58	—N/a	—N/a	—N/a	Non-album singles
"Stitching" (그걸 사랑이라고 말하지마)	2024	92	—N/a	—N/a	—N/a	Stitch
"Time Capsule" (타임캡슐)	2025	2	—N/a	—N/a	—N/a	Non-album single
"—" denotes releases that did not chart.

=== As featured artist ===
Title	Year	Peak chart positions	Sales	Album
Title	Year	KOR	Sales	Album
"Can I Love Again?" (다시 사랑 할 수 있을까) (4Men featuring Davichi)	2010	84	—N/a	The 3rd Generation
"You Call It Romance" (니가 하면 로맨스) (K.Will featuring Davichi)	2016	2	KOR: 942,439	Non-album single

=== Collaborations ===
Title	Year	Peak chart positions		Sales	Album
Title	Year	KOR	KOR Hot	Sales	Album
"Blue Moon" (with SeeYa and Black Pearl)	2008	*	*	—N/a	Color Pink
"Jjarajajja" (짜라자짜) (with Joo Hyun-mi and Seohyun)	2009	*	*	—N/a	Non-album singles
"Women's Generation" (여성시대) (with SeeYa and Jiyeon)	2009	*	*	—N/a	Non-album singles
"Wonder Woman" (원더우먼) (with SeeYa and T-ara)	2010	6	*	KOR: 2,301,658	Non-album singles
"Da Keotjana" (다 컸잖아) (with SeeYa)	2010	—	*	—N/a	Non-album singles
"We Were in Love" (우리 사랑했잖아) (with T-ara)	2011	1	2	KOR: 2,687,535	Funky Town
"Love Is All the Same" (사랑은 다 그런거래요) (with Yangpa & Hanna)	2012	—	—	KOR: 1,261,418	Together
"If It Is Like Tonight" (오늘같은 밤이면) (with 2BiC)	2012	19	—	KOR: 435,594	Cho Young-soo All Star - 2BiC & Davichi
"Bikini" (with T-ara featuring Skull)	2013	20	11	KOR: 168,851	Non-album singles
"Dawn Do That" (새벽을 믿지 말자) (with Gaeko)	2022	109	—	—N/a	Non-album singles
"—" denotes releases that did not chart.

== Other charted songs ==
Title	Year	Peak chart positions		Sales	Album
Title	Year	KOR	KOR Hot	Sales	Album
"I Can't Love You or Say Goodbye" (사랑을 못해 이별을 못해)	2010	6	*	KOR: 1,355,036	Innocence
"First Kiss" (첫키스)	2010	52	*	—N/a	Innocence
"Don't Leave" (떠나지마) (feat. Baek Chan)	2010	30	*	—N/a	Innocence
"Shadow"	2010	58	*	—N/a	Innocence
"Love, My Love" (사랑 사랑아)	2011	9	11	KOR: 2,011,708	Love Delight
"Don't Find Me Again" (다신 찾지마)	2011	19	20	KOR: 392,420	Love Delight
"Happy End"	2011	57	62	KOR: 142,180	Love Delight
"Secret" (비밀)	2011	45	72	KOR: 186,696	Love Delight
"You Are My Everything"	2013	32	34	KOR: 98,021	Mystic Ballad
"Cry for Love" (사랑한다고 말했지)	2013	35	—	KOR: 87,164	Mystic Ballad
"One Person's Story" (한 사람 얘기)	2013	41	—	KOR: 79,722	Mystic Ballad
"Nagging" (잔소리)	2013	55	—	KOR: 64,026	Mystic Ballad
"I Want to Be Brave and Breakup" (용기내 헤어질래)	2013	64	—	KOR: 57,554	Mystic Ballad
"Things That Still Come Up in My Memory" (우리의 시간은 다르다)	2013	71	—	KOR: 55,508	Mystic Ballad
"Taste of Tears" (있어서 눈물이나)	2013	76	—	KOR: 53,835	Mystic Ballad
"Two Women's Room" (두 여자의 방)	2015	16	*	KOR: 129,730	Davichi Hug
"To You" (너에게)	2015	23	*	KOR: 94,016	Davichi Hug
"Spring" (봄)	2015	24	*	KOR: 74,622	Davichi Hug
"Fall Night" (가을의 밤)	2016	52	*	KOR: 92,523	50 x Half
"Have You Ever Been Like That" (그런 적 있나요)	2016	96	*	KOR: 33,716	50 x Half
"Pet"	2016	97	*	KOR: 33,361	50 x Half
"My Love Beside Me" (내사랑 내곁에)	2020	— (Note: "My Love Beside Me" did not enter the Gaon Digital Chart, but appeared at number 93 on the component Gaon Download Chart.)	*	—N/a	Kim Hyun-sik's 30th Anniversary Memorial; Album "Making Memories" Part 2
"—" denotes releases that did not chart.

== Soundtrack appearances ==
Title	Year	Peak chart positions		Sales	Album
Title	Year	KOR	KOR Hot	Sales	Album
"Starry Night"	2008	*	*	—N/a	Unstoppable Marriage OST / Amaranth
"Water Bottle"	2008	*	*	—N/a	Crazy Woman OST / Vivid Summer Edition
"Hot Stuff"	2009	*	*	—N/a	My Fair Lady OST
"My Only One"	2011	7	*	KOR: 774,943	Smile, Mom OST Part.8
"Heaven"	2011	19	*	KOR: 642,598	Ghastly OST
"To Angel"	2011	34	—	KOR: 369,286	Love Request OST Part.1
"Because It's You" (너라서)	2012	21	—	KOR: 721,135	Big OST
"Don't You Know?" (모르시나요)	2013	7	5	KOR: 867,745	Iris II OST
"It's Okay, That's Love" (괜찮아, 사랑이야)	2014	4	*	KOR: 807,620	It's Okay, That's Love OST Vol. 1
"This Love" (이 사랑)	2016	1	*	KOR: 2,500,000	Descendants of the Sun Original Sound Track Vol. 1
"Forgetting You" (그대를 잊는다는 건)	2016	8	*	KOR: 352,134	Moon Lovers: Scarlet Heart Ryeo OST
"Today I Miss You Too" (오늘도 그리워 그리워)	2017	38	*	KOR: 118,445	While You Were Sleeping OST
"Because It's You" (그대니까요)	2018	–	*	—N/a	Live OST
"Falling in Love" (꿈처럼 내린)	2018	19	*	—N/a	The Beauty Inside OST
"Sunset" (노을)	2019	47	*	—N/a	Crash Landing on You OST
"Please Don't Cry"	2020	126	*	—N/a	The King: Eternal Monarch OST
"My Love"	2020	103	*	—N/a	Start-Up OST
"All of My Love"	2021	93	*	—N/a	Doom at Your Service OST
"The Only Reason" (오로지 그대)	2021	60	*	—N/a	Now, We Are Breaking Up OST
"Your Tender Heart Hurts Me" (소녀 같은 맘을 가진 그댈 생각하면 아파요)	2022	115	*	—N/a	Soundtrack #1 OST
"Remember Me" (기억해 줘요)	2022	101	*	—N/a	Our Blues OST
"—" denotes releases that did not chart.
