= K-Pop Star Hunt =

K-Pop competition across Asia

- Season 3 logo
- Genre: Audition, Music, Competition
- Narrated by: Hye-kyeong An (Season 1); Tony An (Season 2)
- Country of origin: South Korea
- Original languages: Korean (Seasons 1-2); Mandarin (Season 3)
- No. of seasons: 3
- No. of episodes: 8 episodes (Season 1); 12 episodes (Season 2); 8 episodes (Season 3)

Production
- Running time: 40-50 minutes per episode

Original release
- Network: Channel M (Southeast Asia) (now known as tvN Asia), Mnet

K-POP Star Hunt is a regional competition that captures the popularity of Korean popular music (K-Pop) in Asia, and gave the Asian viewers a once-in-a-lifetime opportunity to become a K-Pop star.

K-pop Star Hunt was organized by CJ E&M and Fox International. The show was broadcast in southeast Asia by the main channel, Channel M (now known as tvN Asia) and also other channels such as Star World Asia, Channel [V] and Mnet in South Korea.

K-pop Star Hunt seasons 1 and 2 worked with Cube Entertainment in searching for the next K-pop star. FNC Entertainment took over as the star hunter in Season 3.

The eventual winner of season 1 was Sorn of Thailand, while season 2's winner was Ling Ling, also from Thailand. Andy of Taiwan was crowned as the winner for season 3.

== Winners ==
| Year | Season | Winner | Runner-up(s) |
|---|---|---|---|
| 2011 | 1 | Chonnasorn Sajakul (Sorn) | Rince Erich Cajucom (Rince) |
| 2012 | 2 | Kawintida Sujindaporn (Ling Ling) | Khairul Najmuddin Bin Abu Samah (Erul) |
| 2013 | 3 | Su I-chin (Andy) | Putri Norizah Ibnor Riza (Putri); Stephanie Koh Yi Xin (Steph); Chananan Siriburee (Pik) |

== Season 1 (2011–2012) ==
K-pop Star Hunt Season 1 Official Logo

CJ E&M Asia and Fox International have joined forces with Cube Entertainment to produce a new show called K-Pop Star Hunt, a survival program that will be carrying out auditions in popular cities around Asia to find the next potential Cube artist. Known as tvN K-pop Star Hunt: Cube Audition, the online audition started at the end of August.

The overall winner of tvN K-Pop Star Hunt: Cube Audition will get an exclusive contract and 3-year training with South Korea's top record label Cube Entertainment, home to A-list pop groups Beast, BtoB, 4Minute and female artiste G.NA.

Countries that Season Auditions were held at:

- Hong Kong
- Singapore
- Thailand
- Philippines
- Taiwan

Contestants: (ages are at time of competition)

| Contestant | Nickname | Age | Country Audition | Rank |
|---|---|---|---|---|
| Andy Lui | Andy | 17 | Hong Kong | Top 11 |
| Chan Wing Tung | Nicola | 18 | Hong Kong | Top 11 |
| Yu-Jeng Kuan | Chris | 17 | Taiwan | Top 11 |
| Thidarat Rommaneeyapet | June | 14 | Thailand | Top 11 |
| Charmaine Cubos Albino | Meng | 17 | Philippines | Top 11 |
| Maressa Zahirah | Maressa | 22 | Singapore | Top 11 |
| Charlene Cubos Albino | Leng | 17 | Philippines | Top 5 |
| Tan Li Jun Jasmine | Jasmine | 16 | Singapore | Top 5 |
| Ying-yan Chen | Lucica | 15 | Taiwan | Top 3 |
| Rince Cajucom | Rince | 19 | Philippines | Runner-up |
| Chonnasorn Sajakul | Sorn | 15 | Thailand | Won |

=== Results ===
| Order | Episodes | | | | |
| Order | 1 | 4 | 6 | 7 | 8 |
|---|---|---|---|---|---|
| 1 | Maressa | June | Charlene | Sorn | Sorn |
| 2 | Jasmine | Andy | Lucica | Rince | Rince |
| 3 | Andy | Charmaine | Sorn | Lucica | |
| 4 | Nicola | Chris | Rince | | |
| 5 | Chris | Charlene | Jasmine | | |
| 6 | Lucica | Rince | | | |
| 7 | Charlene | Sorn | | | |
| 8 | Rince | Jasmine | | | |
| 9 | Charmaine | Lucica | | | |
| 10 | June | Nicola | | | |
| 11 | Sorn | Maressa | | | |

First Season Missions:

Episode 3, 4: 1ST MISSION: Master A K-Pop Song (Vocal)

- Charmaine picked 2NE1's "I Don't Care",
- Charlene picked CNBLUE's "I'm a Loner",
- Nicola picked Girls' Generation's "Gee",
- Andy picked F.T. Island's "Love Love Love",
- Jasmine picked Apink's "I Don't Know",
- Maressa picked Beast's "Fiction",
- June picked After School's "Because of You",
- Sorn picked Davichi's "8282",
- Lucica picked f(x)'s "Pinocchio (Danger)"
- while both Rince and Chris picked Taeyang's "Only Look At Me".

Episode 5, 6: 2ND MISSION: Catch Up With Beast and 4Minute (Dance)

- Jasmine & Rince: Beast's "Shock"
- Charlene, Sorn & Lucica: 4Minute's "Muzik"

Episode 7: 3RD MISSION: Duet With Trainee (Collaboration)

- Sorn is paired with Lee Changsub (BtoB) to do "Timeless" by Zhang Liyin featuring Xiah Junsu (JYJ),
- Rince is paired with Kim Seo-Ae to do "I Happen to Love You" by Jo Kwon (2AM) and Gain (Brown Eyed Girls) and
- Lucica is paired with Yook Sungjae (BtoB) to do "Trouble Maker" by Trouble Maker.

Episode 8: FINAL MISSION: Final Showdown (Vocal + Dance)

- Rince's mission song: "I'm Sorry I Can't Smile For You" by 2AM and dance song: "Closer" by Ne-Yo
- Sorn's mission song: "Because You are Mine" by G.NA and dance song: "Not Myself Tonight" by Christina Aguilera.

== Season 2 (2012–2013) ==
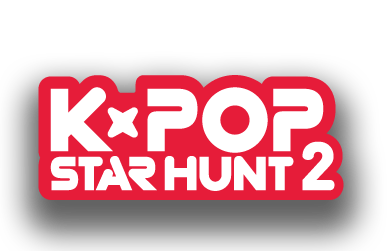
Kpop Star Hunt Season 2 Official Logo

Following the success of Season 1, K-pop Star Hunt Season 2 announced Malaysia, Japan and Vietnam as the sixth, seventh and eighth auditioning country along with Singapore, Hong Kong, Taiwan, Thailand and the Philippines.

The winner of K-Pop Star Hunt Season 2 received an intensive professional training under CJ E&M and Cube Entertainment, along with an album release, and the opportunity to make a debut stage appearance at the 2013 Mnet Asian Music Awards, the leading international music award show in Korea.

Countries that Season Auditions were held at:

- Hong Kong
- Singapore
- Thailand
- Philippines
- Taiwan
- Vietnam
- Malaysia
- Japan

Contestants: (ages are at time of competition):

| Contestant | Nickname | Age | Country Audition | Rank |
|---|---|---|---|---|
| Ngô Đặng Thu Giang | Giang | 22 | Vietnam | Top 16 |
| Leona Ho | Leona | 18 | Hong Kong | Top 16 |
| Tsai Chih-Ang | Chih-Ang | 27 | Taiwan | Top 16 |
| Saika Maeda | Saika | 20 | Japan | Top 16 |
| Shimali De Silva | Shimali | 13 | Hong Kong | Top 12 |
| Anthea Wang Yi Thong | Anthea | 16 | Singapore | Top 12 |
| Isarapa Thawatpakdee | Tarwarn | 15 | Thailand | Top 12 |
| Nguyễn Diệu Hương Trang | Hương Trang | 22 | Vietnam | Top 12 |
| Rendy Lauwandy | Rendy | 20 | Singapore | Top 8 |
| Nur Shazreen Binti Sharupidin | Eryn | 18 | Malaysia | Top 8 |
| Miku Ishida | Miku | 22 | Japan | Top 8 |
| Tanya Tai | Tanya | 21 | Taiwan | Top 5 |
| Liahona Flores | Liahona | 15 | Philippines | Top 5 |
| Sheila Eunice Ona | Sheila | 21 | Philippines | Top 3 |
| Khairul Najmuddin Bin Abu Samah | Erul | 20 | Malaysia | Runner-up |
| Kawintida Sujindaporn | Ling Ling | 15 | Thailand | Won |

=== Results ===
| Order | Episodes | | | | | |
| Order | 5 | 6 | 8 | 10 | 11 | 12 |
|---|---|---|---|---|---|---|
| 1 | Leona | Anthea; Eryn; Ling Ling; Miku; Sheila; Shimali; Tanya; Trang | Rendy | Eryn | Ling Ling | Ling Ling |
| 2 | Shimali | Anthea; Eryn; Ling Ling; Miku; Sheila; Shimali; Tanya; Trang | Sheila | Ling Ling | Tanya | Erul |
| 3 | Lia | Anthea; Eryn; Ling Ling; Miku; Sheila; Shimali; Tanya; Trang | Miku | Erul | Erul | Sheila |
| 4 | Sheila | Anthea; Eryn; Ling Ling; Miku; Sheila; Shimali; Tanya; Trang | Erul | Sheila | Sheila | |
| 5 | Chih-Ang | Anthea; Eryn; Ling Ling; Miku; Sheila; Shimali; Tanya; Trang | Trang | Liahona | Liahona | |
| 6 | Tanya | Anthea; Eryn; Ling Ling; Miku; Sheila; Shimali; Tanya; Trang | Lia | Miku | | |
| 7 | Erul | Anthea; Eryn; Ling Ling; Miku; Sheila; Shimali; Tanya; Trang | Ling Ling | Tanya | | |
| 8 | Eryn | Anthea; Eryn; Ling Ling; Miku; Sheila; Shimali; Tanya; Trang | Anthea | Rendy | | |
| 9 | Tarwarn | Erul | Tanya | | | |
| 10 | Ling Ling | Tarwarn | Shimali | | | |
| 11 | Saika | Leona | Eryn | | | |
| 12 | Miku | Rendy | Tarwarn | | | |
| 13 | Rendy | Giang | | | | |
| 14 | Anthea | Chih-Ang | | | | |
| 15 | Giang | Liahona | | | | |
| 16 | Trang | Saika | | | | |

Second Season Missions:

SPECIAL MISSION: Runners-up Special Challenge

- Chih-Ang (Taiwan) sang 2AM's "Can't Let You Go Even If I Die"
- Liahona (Philippines) sang 2NE1's "Ugly"
- Giang (Vietnam) sang Christina Aguilera's "Beautiful"
- Saika (Japan) sang Alicia Keys' "If I Ain't Got You"
- Leona (Hong Kong) sang Duffy's "Mercy"
- Tarwarn (Thailand) sang Taeyeon's "If"
- Rendy (Singapore) sang Yesung's "It Has To Be You"
- Erul (Malaysia) sang Yesung's "It Has To Be You"

Episode 8: 1ST MISSION: My Best Song

- Rendy picked Ra.D's "Mom"
- Trang picked Tamia's "Almost"
- Sheila picked 2NE1's "It Hurts (Slow)"
- Erul picked K.Will's "Please Don't"
- Shimali picked Taylor Swift's "Sparks Fly"
- Eryn picked Wonder Girls' "So Hot"
- Anthea picked Jessie J's "Who's Laughing Now"
- Tarwarn picked IU's "Secret"
- Miku picked Baek Ji-young's "P.S I Love You"
- Liahona picked G.NA's "Because You're Mine"
- Tanya picked Baek Ji-young's "That Woman"
- Ling Ling picked Baek Ji-young's "That Woman"

Episode 10: 2ND MISSION: Team Mission With BTOB

- Sungjae Team: Miku, Tanya & Rendy performed 8Eight's "I Don't Have A Heart"
- Eunkwang Team: Erul, Sheila & Liahona performed Jung Eun-ji & Seo In-guk's "All For You"
- Chang-sub Team: Ling Ling & Eryn performed MC Mong & Lyn's "Letter To You"

Episode 11: 3RD MISSION: Master A Song Chosen By Shinsadong Tiger

- Ling Ling mission song Shin Seung-hun's "I Believe"
- Tanya mission song Davichi's "Don't Say Goodbye"
- Liahona mission song Davichi's "8282"
- Erul mission song Beast's "On Rainy Days"
- Sheila mission song Ailee's "I Will Show You"

Episode 12: FINAL MISSION: Song Of Your Choice & Favourite Performance

- Erul song choice Kim Bum-Soo's "I Miss You" and favourite performance 2PM's "I'll Be Back"
- Ling Ling song choice Sung Si-Kyung's "Hee Jae" and favourite performance Lee Hi's "1, 2, 3, 4"
- Sheila song choice Insooni's "Goose's Dream" and favourite performance Dream High 2 OST's "Superstar"

== Season 3 (2013–2014) ==
Kpop Star Hunt Season 3 Official Logo

The third season is organized by Channel M, a regional Asian K-pop channel jointly owned by CJ E&M and Fox International Channel, with full training support from FNC Entertainment, one of the top music labels in Korea, which houses idol band groups such as CNBLUE and F.T. Island, AOA, and soloist Juniel, and produced by Singapore-based, award-winning television production company, The Moving Visuals Co. Singaporean airline Scoot was the title sponsor for this season. The season premiere was on November 24, 2013.

The audition for Season 3 started on August 1, 2013, for the first phase of online video submission.

The overall winner for the 3rd season would receive a contract with CJ E&M and FNC Entertainment, 6 to 12 months of K-pop training in Korea, one collaboration song with one FNC artist, a solo debut in Korea and/or their native country, and participation in the 2014 Global M Countdown.

Countries that Season Auditions were held at:

- Singapore
- Taiwan
- Malaysia
- Thailand
- Hong Kong
- Philippines
- Indonesia

Contestants: (ages are at time of competition)

| Contestant | Nickname | Age | Country Audition | Rank |
|---|---|---|---|---|
| Jean Kiley Manguera | Jean | 19 | Philippines | Top 14 |
| Aggy Hong | Aggy | 20 | Taiwan | Top 14 |
| Elma Nathania Christy | Elma | 18 | Indonesia | Top 12 |
| Chester Briones | Chester | 19 | Philippines | Top 12 |
| Lau Chun Yu | Water | 25 | Hong Kong | Top 10 |
| Nopphan Chantarasorn | Mickey | 15 | Thailand | Top 10 |
| Chua Jia Hang | Yvonne | 24 | Singapore | Top 10 |
| Li Ka Yan | Aileen | 23 | Hong Kong | Top 7 |
| Thoo Foo Joe | Ryan | 24 | Malaysia | Top 7 |
| Ardina Glenda Chrysilla | Glenda | 18 | Indonesia | Top 5 |
| Chananan Siriburee | Pik | 18 | Thailand | Top 4 |
| Putri Norizah Ibnor Riza | Putri | 22 | Malaysia | Top 4 |
| Stephanie Koh Yi Xin | Steph | 21 | Singapore | Top 4 |
| Su I Chin | Andy | 15 | Taiwan | Won |

=== Results ===
| Order | Episodes | | | | | |
| Order | 1, 2, 3 | 4 | 5 | 6 | 7 | 8 |
|---|---|---|---|---|---|---|
| 1 | Yvonne | Pik | Putri | Glenda | Andy | Andy |
| 2 | Stephanie | Stephanie | Stephanie | Putri | Stephanie | Pik; Putri; Stephanie |
| 3 | Ryan | Mickey | Glenda | Stephanie | Putri | Pik; Putri; Stephanie |
| 4 | Putri | Putri | Aileen | Pik | Pik | Pik; Putri; Stephanie |
| 5 | Andy | Glenda | Pik | Andy | Glenda | |
| 6 | Aggy | Aileen | Andy | Aileen; Ryan | | |
| 7 | Water | Ryan | Yvonne; Water | Aileen; Ryan | | |
| 8 | Aileen | Andy | Yvonne; Water | | | |
| 9 | Jean | Yvonne | Ryan | | | |
| 10 | Chester | Water | Mickey | | | |
| 11 | Mickey | Chester; Elma | | | | |
| 12 | Pik | Chester; Elma | | | | |
| 13 | Glenda | Aggy; Jean | | | | |
| 14 | Elma | Aggy; Jean | | | | |

Third Season Missions:

1ST MISSION: Unleash Your Kpop Star Potential

- Putri sang Ailee's "Heaven"
- Chester sang Usher's "Oh My God"
- Aileen sang Ailee's "I Will Show You"
- Mickey sang Tiger Huang's
- Ryan sang TVXQ's "Hug"
- Andy sang Taeyang's "I Need A Girl"
- Glenda sang Davichi's "Don't Say Goodbye"
- Water sang Eason Chan's
- Pik sang Apink's "No No No"
- Steph sang Cher Lloyd's "Want U Back"
- Elma sang Taeyeon's "Missing You Like Crazy"
- Yvonne's performance was not shown.

2ND MISSION: The Next Vocal Of K-pop

- Water picked Bobby Kim's "Falling In Love Again"
- Pik picked AOA Black's "MOYA"
- Steph picked Lee Hi's "Rose"
- Ryan picked 2PM's "Again & Again"
- Glenda picked Zia's "Have A Drink"
- Aileen picked Younha's "Password 486"
- Yvonne picked BoA's "Only One"
- Andy picked CNBLUE's "Love Light"
- Mickey picked Henry's "Trap"
- Putri picked Gummy's "There Is No Love"

3RD MISSION: You'll Never Walk Alone

- Putri, Aileen, Glenda (Senoritas) - Navi's "I Ain't Go Home Tonight"
- Pik, Andy, Ryan, Steph (Ras-pect) - Se7en's "Better Together"

4TH MISSION: The Total Package

- Putri's music video Yoo Sung Eun's "Be Ok"
- Andy's music video PRIMARY's "See Through"
- Glenda's music video Baek Ji-young's "I Won't Love"
- Pik's music video G.NA's "I Will Back Off So You Can Live"
- Stephanie's music video Brown Eyed Girls' "Abracadabra"

5TH MISSION: The Grand Finale

- Putri sang Gummy's "There Is No Love" and Leona Lewis' "Homeless"
- Pik sang G.NA's "I Will Back Off So You Can Live" and TTS' "Twinkle"
- Andy sang Taeyang's "I Need A Girl" and G-Dragon's "Crayon" and "MichiGO"
- Stephanie sang Lee Hi's "Rose" and Avril Lavigne's "Rock & Roll"

== After the show ==
SEASON 1:

- Sorn is with girl group CLC. She debuted in March 2015 under Cube Entertainment after 3 years of training. On November 16, 2021, she officially left CLC and Cube Entertainment and on December 3, 2021, she officially signed a contract with WILD Entertainment and debuted as soloist.
- Lucica is now a member of girl group A'N'D and also an actress in Taiwan.
- Rince is a member of BASSIX in the Philippines.
- Charlene and Charmaine are in a performance group called MILES in the Philippines.
- Chris is a VJ with Channel V Taiwan and a TV host. He participated in Taiwan's Next Generations Season 2 with Jolin Tsai as his mentor.
- Maressa does freelance acting on Singapore's MediaCorp Suria channel, and has appeared on MediaCorp Channel 5's On The Red Dot. She is currently an Editor.
- Jasmine and Maressa with Tia (Season 2) and Yvonne (Season 3) formed a performance group called BLANCHE in Singapore.
- June is a professional dancer in Thailand.
- Nicola is now in London pursuing a degree in Fashion at School of Fashion & Design London.
- Andy is now studying in a university in Canada. He is pursuing music now. He was added to the group Seven O'Clock in February 2019.

SEASON 2:

- Ling Ling did her stage debut at 18th Asian Television Awards in Singapore on December 5, 2013. She is no longer undergoing the training by CJE&M. She is now back to her studies.
- Erul gonna debut as "Next Pop star" with Universal Music Malaysia by 2015 & still work as TV Personality.
- Sam is a trainee under Korean entertainment company Philippines branch, JU Entertainment.
- Liahona is a model in Philippines and a trainee under Korean entertainment company Philippines branch, JU Entertainment.
- Tanya participated in Super Idol Season 8 in Taiwan.
- Rendy is a recording artiste in Indonesia.
- Miku is now married.
- Eryn is studying at university in music course and also a dancer.
- Tia with Maressa and Jasmine (Season 1) and Yvonne (Season 3) formed a performance group called BLANCHE in Singapore.
- Tarwarn joined a dance team in Thailand called L.A.M (Look At Me). In 2017 she debuted as a BNK48 member under Independent Artist Management (iAM) in Thailand. She later graduated and became an independent artist.
- Trang is now in Singapore pursuing a degree in Events Management and sometime joins performance group BLANCHE along with Maressa, Jasmine, Tia and Yvonne.
- Shimali is a student in high school.
- Giang later competed joining a Vietnam - Korea co-operated survival show K-Pop Star Hunt Vietnam / Ngôi Sao Việt where she placed third. Afterward, she changed her stage name Suni Hạ Linh and made her debut as a solo singer.
- Leona currently studying in university.
- Saika currently studying in University of Pennsylvania.
- Chih-Ang sometimes performs on stage with a band.

SEASON 3:

- Andy is a trainee under FNC Entertainment. He has solo debut in China with first single, "Puppy Love" under CJ E&M.
- Putri is back in Malaysia and continue as independent artist/singer. She gave birth to a baby girl in 2015.
- Stephanie has moved to Sydney, Australia to pursue her English Music career.
- Yvonne with Maressa and Jasmine (Season 1) and Tia (Season 2) formed a performance group called BLANCHE in Singapore.
- Elma and Glenda is back in Indonesia and continue as independent singer. Elma officially signed a contract with Yovie Widianto Music Factory and Sony Music Indonesia for debut as soloist with first single "Bertahan Hati" while Glenda often singing a song cover in YouTube with first single "Hanya Dirimu".
