= Kang Min Kyung Vol. 1 =

EP by Kang Min-kyung
- Released: February 27, 2019
- Recorded: 2019
- Genre: K-pop, ballad
- Length: 23:43
- Label: Stone Music Entertainment; B2M Entertainment

Singles from Kang Min Kyung Vol. 1
- 1. "Because I Love You" Released: February 27, 2019

Kang Min Kyung Vol. 1 is the debut extended play of Kang Min-kyung, one half of South Korean duo Davichi. It was released on February 27, 2019.

The album is Kang Min-kyung's first solo debut after 11 years as a Davichi member. She participated in writing, composing and producing all tracks on this album.

== Release ==
On February 1, 2019, Kang Min-kyung's agency confirmed that she would release her first solo extended play on February 27.

On February 23, 2019, Kang released the first music video teaser for "Because I Love You".

On February 26, 2019, just 1 day prior to the album releasing, Kang released the second music video teaser for "Because I Love You".

== Track listing ==
No.	Title	Lyrics	Music	Arrangement	Length
1.	"End of 20's" (스물 끝에)	Kang Min-kyung	Kang Min-kyung, Captain Planet	Captain Planet	3:48
2.	"Because I Love You" (사랑해서 그래)	Kang Min-kyung	Kang Min-kyung, Captain Planet	Captain Planet	4:43
3.	"Selfish" (미운 날)	Kang Min-kyung	Kang Min-kyung, BrotherSu	dress, Glowingdog	3:15
4.	"Tell Me" (말해봐요)	Kang Min-kyung	Kang Min-kyung, Captain Planet	Captain Planet	3:47
5.	"My Youth" (너여서)	BrotherSu	BrotherSu	BrotherSu	3:27
6.	"Because I Love You (Inst.)" (사랑해서 그래)		Kang Min-kyung, Captain Planet	Captain Planet	4:43
Total length:					23:43

== Charts and certifications ==
=== Albums chart ===
Chart	Peak position
Gaon Weekly albums chart	25
Gaon Monthly albums chart	69

=== Sales and certifications ===
Chart	Amount
Gaon physical sales	2,062+

== Release history ==
Region	Date	Format	Label
South Korea	February 27, 2019	CD, digital download	Stone Music Entertainment; B2M Entertainment
Worldwide	February 27, 2019	Digital download	Stone Music Entertainment
