= Fanfare (disambiguation) =

A fanfare is a flourish of music for brass instruments.

Fanfare may also refer to:

== Music ==
- Fanfare Records, a former British record label
- Fanfares (album), a 2012 album by GoGo Penguin
- Fanfare (Skids album) (1982)
- Fanfare (Jonathan Wilson album) (2013)
- Fanfare, 2023 album by Dorian Electra
- "Fanfare" (Davichi song)
- "Fanfare" (song), a 2020 single by Twice
- "Fanfare", a 2018 track by Toby Fox from Deltarune Chapter 1 OST from the video game Deltarune
- Fanfare (magazine), an American classical music magazine

== Other uses ==
- Fanfare (ballet), a 1953 ballet by Jerome Robbins
- Fanfare (company), a former American technology company
- Fanfare (decoy), a torpedo decoy
- Fanfare (film), a 1958 Dutch comedy film
- French destroyer Fanfare
- Fanfare, a sculpture by Neil Dawson

== See also ==
- Fanfare band, a musical ensemble composed of percussion instruments, bugles, natural horns and natural trumpets
- Fanfare trumpet, a long trumpet build
