= &10 =

Studio album by Davichi
- Released: January 25, 2018
- Recorded: 2017–2018
- Genres: Ballad; R&B; soul
- Length: 42:04
- Language: Korean
- Labels: B2M Entertainment; Stone Music Entertainment; CJ E&M

Davichi chronology
50 x Half (2016)	&10 (2018)

Singles from &10
- 1. "Days Without You" Released: January 25, 2018

&10 is the third studio album by South Korean duo Davichi. The album was digitally released on January 25, 2018, with the physical release following the same day. "Days Without You" (너 없는 시간들) served as the promotional single, with Wanna One's Kang Daniel starring in the music video. This album also marks Davichi's 10th anniversary since debut.

== Background ==
On December 14, 2017 Davichi were reported to be returning with a full-length album in January 2018. According to reports, Davichi were busy preparing for their year-end concert 'La eve - Davichi Concert' and also recording tracks of the album when they had time. On December 21, it was reported that Kang Daniel of boygroup Wanna One would star in Davichi's upcoming comeback music video. This would be his second time acting in an MV following Wanna One's "Beautiful". On January 16, 2018 B2M Entertainment confirmed that Davichi's third studio album would be released on January 25.

== Promotions ==
Promotions for "Days Without You" on South Korea's television music programs began on the January 25, 2018 broadcast of M! Countdown. On January 26, Davichi released their first-ever reality show called "Davichi Chord" on the online platform Dingo.

== Track listing ==
Track list
No.	Title	Lyrics	Music	Length
1.	"Just The Two Of Us" (우리 둘)	Lee Juck	Lee Juck	4:14
2.	"Days Without You" (너 없는 시간들)	Shim Hyun Bo	Cho Young-soo	4:33
3.	"Lovesick" (알아서 앓아요)	Xepy	Xepy	4:13
4.	"Can We" (그래도 우리)	Lee Hae-ri	Lee Hae-ri	4:35
5.	"Never Love" (사랑하지 말아요)	Kang Min-kyung	Kang Min-kyung, Captain Planet	3:49
6.	"Bitter End" (아픈 끝)	Dalchong	Dong-hwan, Dalchong	4:43
7.	"Love You More" (내가 더 사랑하는 일)	Kang Min-kyung, Roco Berry	Roco Berry	3:37
8.	"Days Gone By" (지난 날)	1601	1601	4:22
9.	"Even Though I Hate You, I Love You (Special Track)" (미워도 사랑하니까)	Ryu Jae-hyun	Ryu Jae-hyun	5:25
10.	"Days Without You (Inst.)" (너 없는 시간들)	Cho Young-soo	Cho Young-soo, Han Gil	4:33
Total length:				42:04

== Chart performance ==
=== Album chart ===
Chart	Peak Position
Gaon Weekly album chart	15
Gaon Monthly album chart	52
Gaon Yearly album chart	—

=== Sales and certifications ===
Chart	Amount
Gaon physical sales	3,420+

== Release history ==
Country	Date	Format	Label
South Korea	January 25, 2018	Digital download	B2M Entertainment; Stone Music Entertainment; CJ E&M Music
Worldwide	January 25, 2018	Digital download	B2M Entertainment; Stone Music Entertainment; CJ E&M Music
South Korea	January 25, 2018	CD	B2M Entertainment; Stone Music Entertainment; CJ E&M Music
