= H (Lee Hae-ri EP) =

h

EP by Lee Hae-ri
- Released: April 19, 2017
- Recorded: 2017
- Genre: K-pop, ballad
- Length: 29:43
- Label: CJ E&M Music; B2M Entertainment

Lee Hae-ri chronology
h (2017)	From h (2020)

Singles from h
- 1. "Pattern" Released: April 11, 2017; 2. "Hate That I Miss You" Released: April 19, 2017

h is the debut extended play of Lee Haeri, one half of South Korean duo Davichi. It was released on April 19, 2017.

The album consisted of "Pattern" and "Hate That I Miss You", both serves as the album's title track.

"Pattern" is a groovy medium-tempo track that expertly combines charismatic bass and Lee Hae-ri's chic voice, a collaborative effort of singer-songwriter Sunwoo Jung-A and producer realmeee, resulting in quite a different sound and style from Davichi.

"Hate That I Miss You" is a traditional ballad track, which delivers deep and heart-breaking emotions.

== Release ==
On April 6, 2017, it was revealed that Lee was working on her solo mini album and planned for a mid-April release. This is her first solo release 9 years after her debut as Davichi.

On April 11, 2017, Lee released her first official solo track "Pattern", a pre-release for her solo debut album h. She also announced that the music video would be released on April 12.

On April 17, 2017, Lee released the full track list for the solo album.

On April 19, 2017, Lee released the music video for her 2nd title track "Hate That I Miss You".

== Track listing ==
No.	Title	Lyrics	Music	Arrangement	Length
1.	"Pattern"	선우정아, Realmeee	선우정아	선우정아, Realmeee	3:37
2.	"Season Of You" (그대라는 계절)	Score (13), Megatone (13)	Score (13), Megatone (13)	민연재, 최성일	4:22
3.	"Hate That I Miss You" (미운 날)	신용재 (포맨)	최성일	최성일, 민연재	4:37
4.	"Paper Star's Dream" (종이별의 꿈)	제피 (Xepy), 두리, 이경민, Lohi	두리, Lohi, 1MAD	제피 (Xepy)	4:35
5.	"We Are" (우린)		적재	이해리 (다비치)	3:56
6.	"Even Though" (보이지 않아도)	Matthew Tishler, Robyn Newman	Matthew Tishler	김이나	3:59
7.	"Hate That I Miss You (Piano ver.)" (CD only)	신용재 (포맨)	최성일	최성일, 민연재	4:37
Total length:					29:43

== Chart performance ==
=== Albums chart ===
Chart	Peak position
Gaon Weekly albums chart	16
Gaon Monthly albums chart	49

=== Sales and certifications ===
Chart	Amount
Gaon physical sales	1,952+

== Release history ==
Region	Date	Format	Label
South Korea	April 19, 2017	CD, digital download	CJ E&M Music; B2M Entertainment
Worldwide	April 19, 2017	Digital download	CJ E&M Music
