= Innocence (Davichi EP) =

EP by Davichi
- Released: May 6, 2010
- Recorded: 2010
- Genre: K-pop; R&B
- Language: Korean
- Label: Core Contents Media

Davichi chronology
Davichi in Wonderland (2009)	Innocence (2010)	Love Delight (2011)

Singles from Innocence
- 1. "Time, Please Stop" Released: May 6, 2010

Innocence is the second extended play by South Korean duo Davichi, released on May 6, 2010. "Time, Please Stop" was used as the promotional song.

== Promotions ==
After the massive success of their previous extended play and their first concert, Davichi announced in the beginning of March that they would be returning with another extended play. It was originally scheduled to be released towards the end of March, but the group's comeback was pushed to May due to member Min-kyung's injury in a car accident. The lead single, "Time, Please Stop" had a distinctive ballad-punk rock mixture and was supposed to take on a heavier tone than their previous release "8282". Label mate Eunjung from the girl group T-ara starred in the song's music video, which portrayed a modern-day version of Snow White.

== Track listing ==
No.	Title	Lyrics	Music	Arrangements	Length
1.	"Time, Please Stop" (시간아 멈춰라)	Bang Si-hyuk	Bang Si-hyuk, Kim Do-hoon	Wonderkid	3:24
2.	"First Kiss" (첫키스)	Lee Hyung-suk	Yoon Gun	Yoon Gun	3:45
3.	"Don't Leave" (떠나지마) (feat. Baek Chan)	Yoon Myung-sun, Baek Chan	Yoon Myung-sun	Kim Jin-hwan	3:42
4.	"I Can't Love You or Say Goodbye" (사랑을 못해 이별을 못해)	Kim Do-hoon, Kim Ki-bum	Kim Do-hoon, Kim Ki-bum	Kim Do-hoon, Kim Ki-bum	3:45
5.	"Shadow"	DK4RG, Lee Sang-baek	Park Hae-mun, Kim Min-yoo, Park Hae-un	Park Hae-mun, Kim Min-yoo, Park Hae-un	3:50
