= Mystic Ballad =

Studio album by Davichi
- Released: March 18, 2013
- Recorded: 2011–2013
- Genre: R&B
- Length: 47:12
- Language: Korean
- Label: Core Contents Media

Davichi chronology
Love Delight (2011)	Mystic Ballad (2013)

Singles from Mystic Ballad
- 1. "Turtle" Released: March 3, 2013; 2. "Just the Two of Us" Released: March 18, 2013; 3. "Be Warmed (ft. Verbal Jint)" Released: April 1, 2013

Mystic Ballad is the second studio album by South Korean duo Davichi. The album was digitally released on March 18, 2013, with the physical release following on April 2, 2013. "Just the Two of Us" (둘이서 한잔해) served as the promotional single. The track "Turtle" was released as a digital single two weeks prior to the initial album release.

== Background ==
The release of the album was officially announced on January 21, 2013. Davichi expressed, "We’re going to be showing a lot of music that we’ve never attempted before through our second studio album in March. Please look forward to it." On February 27, 2013, the members of Davichi informed fans that the album would be released on March 18, 2013, and that they would be working with famous artists Duble Sidekick, Verbal Jint, Jung Suk Won and Ryu Jae Hyun. On March 3, 2013, Davichi pre-released the music video for the track, "Turtle", which featured 5dolls member Hyoyoung. The song quickly climbed real-time charts and placed #1 on South Korea's Gaon Single Chart. On March 18, 2013, the album, and music video for their title track, "Just the Two of Us" were digitally released to the public. Despite being left off the initial digital release, Davichi released the single "Be Warmed (feat. Verbal Jint)", as well as the accompanying music video, on April 1, 2013. The song was met with instant success in South Korea, and even managed to place number one on every single digital real time charting, obtaining the coveted 'all-kill'. The album was physically released to the public the following day.

== Composition ==
The album is composed of twelve tracks; ten new songs and two instrumentals. The pre-released track list showed a tenth new song featuring Verbal Jint, which was not initially included on the digital release of the album. Davichi's own member, Minkyung, contributed to the album by writing the lyrics to "Things That Still Come Up in My Memory". Ryu Jae Hyun of Korean R&B group Vibe contributed to the album through the production of the promotional single "Just the Two of Us", as well as "Nagging". Famous producers Duble Sidekick, who are known for their work with Leessang, Baek Ji-young and ZIA, lent their help to the duo and produced the pre-release track "Turtle". Legendary producer Cho Young Soo contributed to the album by producing the first track "One Person's Story". Davichi has worked with Cho Young Soo in the past to produce their promotional single "Love and War" from the album Vivid Summer Edition.

== Promotions ==
Davichi announced that they would be focusing solely on radio promotions for the first part of their comeback. The members expressed that they want to be able to introduce and explain all the songs on their album to the general public, not just their promotional single. Promotions for "Just the Two of Us" on South Korea's televised music programs began on the March 21, 2013, broadcast of M! Countdown. On March 28, 2013, "Just the Two of Us" achieved the #1 spot on M! Countdown, securing Davichi's fifteenth televised music show win.

== Track listing ==
Track list
No.	Title	Lyrics	Music	Length
1.	"One Person's Story" (한 사람 얘기)	Cho Young Soo	Cho Young Soo	4:22
2.	"Just the Two of Us" (둘이서 한잔해)	Ryu Jae Hyun	Ryu Jae Hyun	3:43
3.	"Turtle" (거북이)	Duble Sidekick	Duble Sidekick	3:44
4.	"Cry for Love" (사랑한다고 말했지)	Ahn Young Min	Ahn Young Min	3:55
5.	"Taste of Tears" (맛 있어서 눈물이나)	Jung Suk Won	Jung Suk Won	4:42
6.	"Things That Still Come Up in My Memory" (우리의 시간은 다르다)	Kang Min-kyung	Lee Seung Whan	4:00
7.	"Be Warmed" (녹는중) (ft. Verbal Jint)	Kim Jin Tae	Kim Jin Tae	3:47
8.	"Nagging" (잔소리)	Ryu Jae Hyun	Ryu Jae Hyun	4:53
9.	"I Want to be Brave and Breakup" (용기내 헤어질래)	Kang Hyun-min	Kang Hyun-min	4:14
10.	"You Are My Everything"	압구정보안관, Lee Ji Won	압구정보안관	4:24
11.	"Just the Two of Us (Inst.)" (둘이서 한잔해 (Inst.))		Ryu Jae Hyun	3:43
12.	"Turtle (Inst.)" (거북이 (Inst.))		Duble Sidekick	3:44
Total length:				47:12

== Chart performance ==
=== Single chart ===
Title	Peak Positions	
Title	KOR	KOR
Title	Gaon	Billboard K-Pop Hot 100
"Turtle"	1	2
"Just the Two of Us"	2	9
"Be Warmed (ft. Verbal Jint)"	1	3

=== Album chart ===
Chart	Peak Position
Gaon Weekly album chart	3
Gaon Monthly album chart	7
Gaon Yearly album chart	—

=== Other charted songs ===
Song	Peak Position		
Song	KOR	KOR	
Song	Gaon	Billboard K-Pop Hot 100	
Song	"You Are My Everything"	32	34
Song	"Cry for Love"	35	—
"One Person's Story"	41	—	
"Nagging"	55	—	
"I Want to be Brave and Breakup"	64	—	
"Things That Still Come Up in My Memory"	71	—	
"Taste of Tears"	76	—	

=== Sales and certifications ===
Chart	Amount
Gaon physical sales	16,168+

== Release history ==
Country	Date	Format	Label
South Korea	March 18, 2013	Digital download	Core Contents Media LOEN Entertainment
Worldwide	March 18, 2013	Digital download	Core Contents Media LOEN Entertainment
South Korea	April 2, 2013	CD	Core Contents Media LOEN Entertainment
