= Lee Hae-ri =

South Korean singer and actress (born 1985)

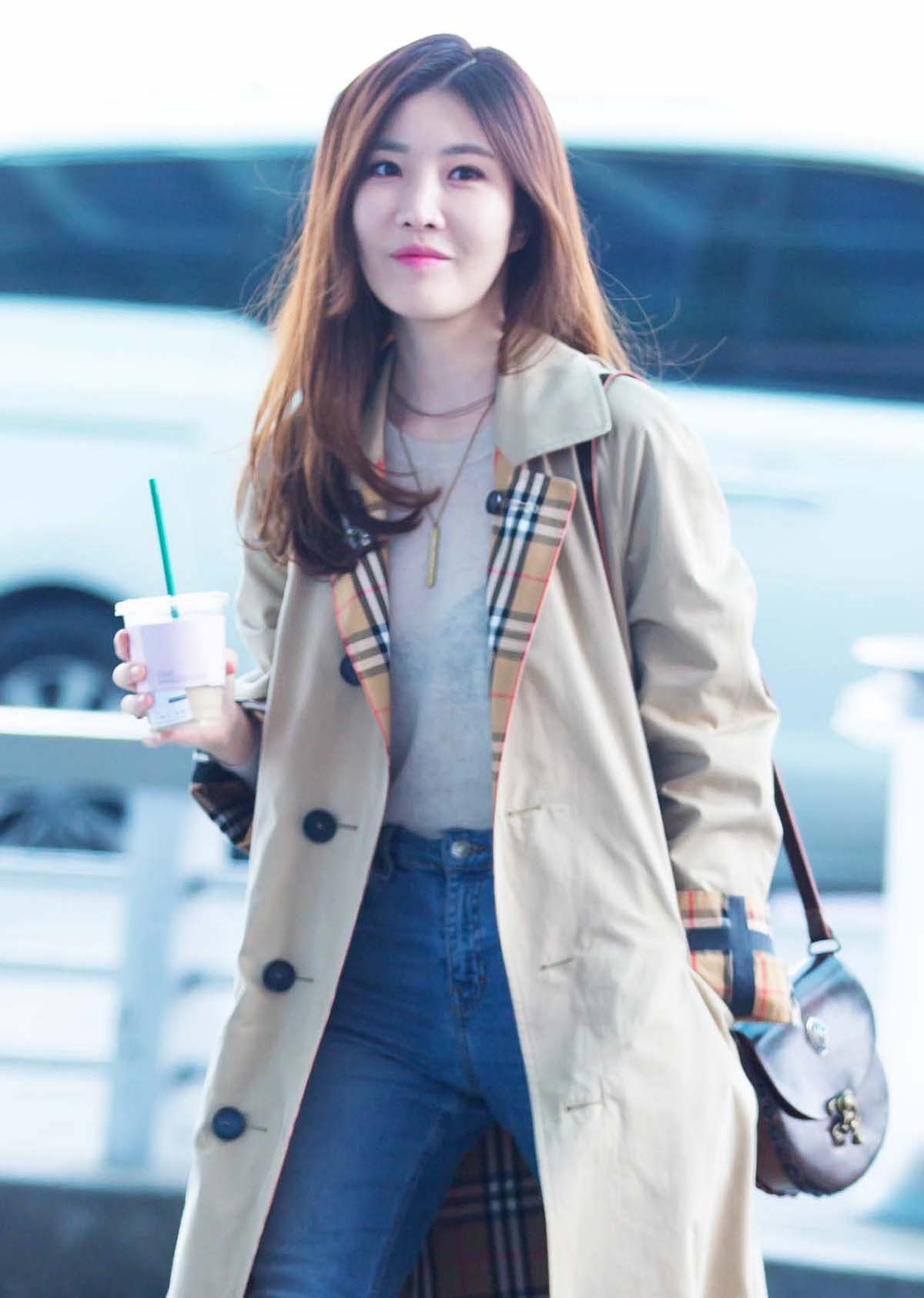
- Lee Hae-ri at Incheon International Airport in March 2018
- Born: February 14, 1985 (age 40); Seoul, South Korea
- Occupation: Singer
- Spouse: Unknown (m. 2022)
- Musical career
- Genres: K-pop; ballad; R&B; soul
- Instrument: Vocals
- Years active: 2008–present
- Labels: Wake One
- Member of: Davichi

Korean name
- Hangul: 이해리
- Hanja: 李해리
- RR: I Haeri
- MR: I Haeri

Lee Hae-ri (Korean: 이해리; born February 14, 1985) is a South Korean singer and musical theater actress. She debuted as a member of Davichi in 2008. Aside from her group's activities, she has established herself as a musical actress, notably through her participation in the original and Korean versions of stage musicals including Tears of Heaven (2011), Mozart, l'opéra rock (2012) and Hero (2014). On April 19, 2017, she debuted as a solo artist with her first extended play, h.

== Personal life ==
In May 2022, Lee's agency announced that she would marry her non-celebrity boyfriend in July 2022, which was to be held as a private event.

== Discography ==
=== Extended plays ===
Title	Album details	Peak chart positions	Sales
Title	Album details	KOR	Sales
h	Released: April 19, 2017; Label: CJ E&M, B2M Entertainment; Formats: CD, digital download	16	KOR: 1,952
From h	Released: January 29, 2020; Label: Stone Music Entertainment; Formats: CD, digital download	11	

=== As lead artist ===
Title	Year	Peak chart positions	Sales	Album
Title	Year	KOR Gaon	Sales	Album
"Crazy Woman" (with Lee Jung-won and Kim Yeon-ji)	2008	—	No data	East Of Eden
"Red Bean"	2008	—	No data	East Of Eden
"At That Time, I Will Live"	2011	—	No data	Lee Hae-ri & E-Tribe Project
"Can Your Hear Me?"	2011	—	No data	Tears of Heaven Musical
"The Person I Love"	2011	—	No data	Poseidon
"You're All Grown Up" (with SeeYa)	2012	—	No data	Seeya Davichi
"If You Loved Me" (with Zia)	2013	5	No data	If You Loved Me
"Feeling So Empty Without You" (with 4Men's Shin Yong-jae)	2014	—	No data	Acoustic Project #1. Cloud
"Pattern"	2017	25	KOR: 85,241	h
"Hate That I Miss You"	2017	28	KOR: 92,514	h
"Maybe"	2019	—	No data	Her Private Life OST
"Heartache" (나만 아픈 일)	2019	23	No data	From h
"Just Cry" (우는 법을 잊어버렸나요)	2020	85	No data	From h
"—" denotes songs that did not chart or was not released in that region.

=== As featured artist ===
Title	Year	Peak chart positions	Sales	Album
Title	Year	KOR Gaon	Sales	Album
"Love Is All The Same" (Yangpa featuring Lee Hae-ri)	2012	—	No data	Together
"Poison" (The SeeYa featuring Lee Hae-ri)	2012	28	No data	Love U
"Sorrow" (Wonder Boyz featuring Lee Hae-ri)	2012	—	No data	Non album-single
"The Road To School" (Kim Jin-ho featuring Lee Hae-ri)	2013	—	No data	Today
"Heart" (Highbrow featuring Lee Hae-ri)	2015	—	No data	Eastist
"Lie" (Mad Clown featuring Lee Hae-ri)	2016	10	KOR: 367,398	Non album-single
"—" denotes songs that did not chart or was not released in that region.

== Filmography ==
=== Television shows ===
Year	Title	Role	Notes	Ref.
2020–present	Sing Again	Judge	Season 1–3	
2024	My Name is Gabriel	Panelist		

== Musical ==
Year	Title	Role	Ref.
2011	Tears of Heaven	Rynn	
2012	Mozart, l'opéra rock	Constanze	
2014	Hero	Seol-hee	

== Concerts ==
- 2017 Lee Hae Ri Solo Concert 'h'
