= Kang Min-kyung =

South Korean singer and actress (born 1990)

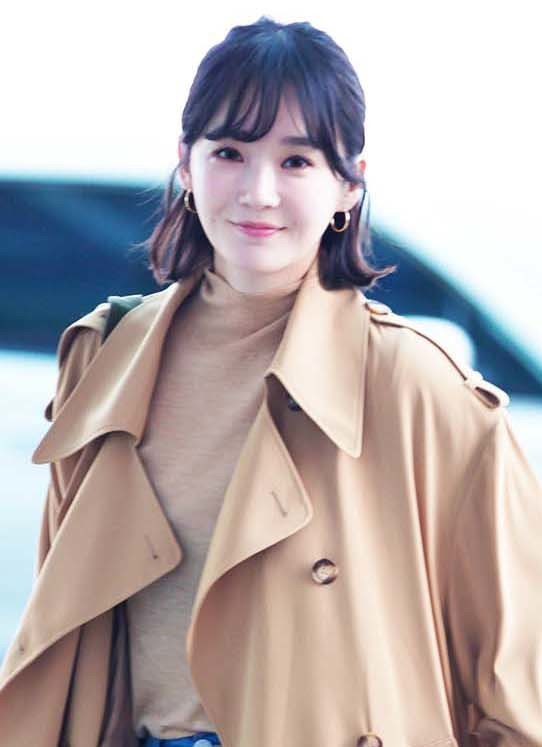
- Kang at Incheon International Airport in March 2018
- Born: August 3, 1990 (age 36); Seoul, South Korea
- Education: Kyung Hee University
- Occupations: Singer; actress
- Musical career
- Genre: K-pop
- Instrument: Vocals
- Years active: 2008–present
- Label: Wake One
- Member of: Davichi

Korean name
- Hangul: 강민경
- Hanja: 姜珉炅
- RR: Gang Mingyeong
- MR: Kang Min'gyŏng

Kang Min-kyung (Korean: 강민경; born August 3, 1990) is a South Korean singer and actress. She is one half of the duo Davichi, who rose to fame upon the release of their debut album Amaranth in 2008. Davichi has since released 3 studio albums, 6 extended plays and several hit songs such as "Don't Say Goodbye", "Turtle", "Missing You Today" and "8282". Kang has also pursued acting, appearing in television dramas such as Smile, Mom (2010), Vampire Idol (2011), Haeundae Lovers (2012) and family drama The Dearest Lady (2015). On February 27, 2019, she debuted as a solo artist with her first extended play Kang Min Kyung Vol. 1.

She launched a clothing shopping mall called 'Àvie Muah' in June 2020.

== Philanthropy ==
On December 9, 2022, Kang donated 150 million won through Yonsei University Medical Center to support social programs for children and adolescents.

== Discography ==
=== Extended plays ===
Title	Details	Peak chart positions	Sales
Title	Details	KOR	Sales
Kang Min Kyung Vol. 1	Released: February 27, 2019; Label: Stone Music Entertainment; Formats: CD, digital download, streaming audio	25	KOR: 2,062

=== Singles ===
Title	Year	Peak chart positions	Album
Title	Year	KOR	Album
As lead artist
"Happy Together" (with Park Ji-heon)	2008	—	Non-album singles
"Udon" (우동) (with Son Dong-woon)	2010	33	Non-album singles
"Because I Love You" (사랑해서 그래)	2019	30	Kang Min Kyung Vol. 1
"Digital Lover"	2020	—	Non-album singles
"Because We Loved" (우린 그렇게 사랑해서) (with Choi Jung-hoon)	2022	12	Non-album singles
As featured artist
"If You Pretend" (척하면 척) (Kim Jong Wook feat. Kang Min-kyung of Davichi)	2009	—	One Find Day
"That's My Fault" (슬픈약속) (Speed feat. Kang Min-kyung of Davichi)	2013	24	Superior Speed
"Haeundae" (해운대) (Vibe feat. Kang Min-kyung)	2014	7	Ritardando
"My Type 2" (Verbal Jint feat. Kang Min-kyung & Sanchez)	2015	17	Non-album singles
"Refresh" (새로고침) (Park Kyung feat. Kang Min-kyung)	2020	95	Non-album singles
"—" denotes releases that did not chart or were not released in that region.

=== Soundtrack appearances ===
Title	Year	Peak chart positions	Album
Title	Year	KOR	Album
As lead artist
"Farewell Is Coming" (이별이 온다)	2012	27	Lovers of Haeundae OST
"Rain, Street, You and Me" (비 오는 거리 너와 나) (with Kisum)	2018	—	Suits OST
"Always" (언제나)	2022	— (Note: "Always" did not enter the Circle Digital Chart, but it peaked at number 95 on the component Download Chart.)	Elsword OST
"Lasting Like the Last Day" (오늘이 마지막인 것처럼)	2024	162	My Demon OST
As featured artist
"Higher Plane" (Flowsik feat. Kang Min-kyung)	2017	—	Criminal Minds OST
"—" denotes releases that did not chart or were not released in that region.

== Filmography ==
=== Television series ===
Year	Title	Role	Notes	Ref.
2010	Smile, Mom	Shin Dal-rae	Main role	
2011	Vampire Idol	Kang Min-kyung	Supporting role	
2012	Lovers of Haeundae	Hwang Joo-hee	Supporting role	
2015	The Dearest Lady	Han Ah-reum	Main role	

=== Television shows ===
Year	Title	Role	Notes	Ref.
2011	Immortal Songs 2	Contestant		
2016	Duet Song Festival	Contestant	with Kim Min-ho (Episode 29–30)	
2023	Begin Again - Intermission	Cast Member	spin-off	
2024	My Name is Gabriel	Panelist		

=== Hosting ===
Year	Title	Notes	Ref.
2022	2022 MBC Entertainment Awards	with Jun Hyun-moo and Lee Yi-kyung	

== Musical ==
Year	Title	Role	Ref.
2012	Our Youth, Roly Poly Musical		

== Awards and nominations ==
Name of the award ceremony, year presented, category, nominee of the award, and the result of the nomination
Award ceremony	Year	Category	Nominee / Work	Result	Ref.
Brand of the Year Awards	2022	Celebrity YouTuber of the Year Award	Kang Min-kyung	Won	
