= Davichi in Wonderland =

EP by Davichi
- Released: February 27, 2009
- Recorded: 2008
- Genre: K-pop; R&B
- Language: Korean
- Label: Core Contents Media; Maroo Entertainment

Davichi chronology
Amaranth (2008)	Davichi in Wonderland (2009)	Innocence (2010)

Singles from Davichi in Wonderland
- 1. "8282" Released: February 27, 2009; 2. "My Man" Released: April 9, 2009

Davichi in Wonderland is the first extended play by South Korean duo Davichi, released on February 27, 2009. A total of three music videos were released to the promote the album, with the M/Vs for "8282" and "Accident" being a 2-part drama music video starring Jung Chan-woo and Yoon Jung-hee. ("8282"is pronounced similarly as the Korean word "빨리빨리" which means "quickly".)

== Promotions ==
At the beginning of February, Davichi's management announced they would be making a comeback after the successful debut of their first album. The lead single "8282" was met with great success and went on to become one of the duo's most successful releases to date. Additionally, the song "Is Love Funny" also charted well and reached a peak position of number three on KBS's Music Bank. There was a minor controversy surrounding the writer of the song "8282", with some people believing it plagiarized British singer Mika's "Happy Ending".

In April, the duo began their follow-up promotions with their song "My Man", which showcased their dancing skills.

== Track listing ==
No.	Title	Lyrics	Music	Arrangements	Length
1.	"8282"	Kang Eun-kyung	Kim Do-hoon, Lee Hyun-seung	Lee Hyun-seung
2.	"I Made A Mistake" (사고쳤어요)	Kang Eun-kyung	Park Geun-tae	Ok Jung Yong
3.	"My Man"	DK4RG, Lee Sang-baek	Park Hae-mun, Park Hae-un	Park Hae-mun, Park Hae-un
4.	"Is Love Funny" (사랑이 우습니)	Min Myung-ki, Misty	Min Myung-ki	Song Dae-ki, Park Dong-kyu
5.	"Music Box" (오르골)	Hwang Sung-jin	Lee Sang-ho [Fan], Kim Do-hoon	Lee Sang-ho [Fan]
6.	"Crazy Woman" (Lee Hae-ri featuring Kim Yeon-ji and Lee Jung-min)	Ahn Young-min, Cho Young-soo	Cho Young-soo	Cho Young-soo
