= Love Delight =

EP by Davichi
- Released: August 29, 2011
- Recorded: 2010–2011
- Genre: Pop, R&B
- Length: 21:31
- Language: Korean
- Label: Core Contents Media

Davichi chronology
Innocence (2010)	Love Delight (2011)	Mystic Ballad (2013)

Singles from Love Delight
- 1. "Don't Say Goodbye" Released: August 29, 2011

Love Delight is the third EP by South Korean duo Davichi. The EP was digitally and physically released on August 29, 2011. "Don't Say Goodbye" was used as the promotional song. The EP contains five new songs and one instrumental. It was also released worldwide through iTunes.

== Promotions ==
Promotions for the EP started on September 1, 2011, on MNET's M! Countdown. The duo also promoted on KBS's Music Bank, MBC's Music Core and SBS's Inkigayo. The song "Love, My Love" was chosen as part of their comeback. On September 18 and October 2, "Don't Say Goodbye" claimed the #1 spot on Inkigayo, earning the duo two 'mutizen' awards. On October 7 and October 14, the duo claimed the #1 spot on Music Bank, earning them two 'K Chart' awards.

== Track listing ==
Track list
No.	Title	Length
1.	"Don't Say Goodbye" (안녕이라고 말하지마)	3:49
2.	"Love, My Love" (사랑 사랑아)	3:32
3.	"Don't Find Me Again" (다신 찾지마)	3:44
4.	"Happy End"	3:55
5.	"Secret" (비밀)	4:02
6.	"Don't Say Goodbye (Instrumental)"	3:49
Total length:		21:31

== Leak ==
On August 27, 2011, it was revealed by Davichi's label, Core Contents Media, that the entire Love Delight EP had been leaked on the internet. Despite the leak quickly making its way through internet portal sites, the company did not change the release date of the EP.

== Chart performance ==
=== Single chart ===
Title	Peak Positions	
Title	KOR	KOR
Title	Gaon	Billboard K-Pop Hot 100
"Don't Say Goodbye"	1	1

==== Other songs charted ====
Song	Peak Position		
Song	KOR	KOR	
Song	Gaon	Billboard K-Pop Hot 100	
Song	"Love, My Love"	9	11
Song	"Don't Find Me Again"	19	20
"Secret"	45	72	
"Happy End"	57	62	

=== Album chart ===
Chart	Peak position
Gaon Weekly album chart	3
Gaon Monthly album chart	13

== Sales and certifications ==
Chart	Amount
Gaon physical sales	15,960+

== Release history ==
Country	Date	Format	Label
South Korea	August 29, 2011	CD, Digital download	Core Contents Media LOEN Entertainment
Worldwide	August 29, 2011	Digital download	Core Contents Media LOEN Entertainment
