= Amaranth (album) =

Studio album by Davichi
- Released: January 28, 2008; July 3, 2008 (Repackage)
- Genres: K-pop; R&B
- Language: Korean
- Labels: Mnet Media (Core Contents Media and Maroo Entertainment)

Davichi chronology
| Amaranth (2008) | Davichi in Wonderland (2009) |

Singles from Amaranth
- 1. "I Love You Even Though I Hate You" Released: January 25, 2008; 2. "Sad Promise" Released: April 2, 2008; 3. "Love and War" Released: June 30, 2008

Amaranth is the first studio album of the South Korean duo Davichi, released on January 28, 2008. Actress Lee Mi-yeon and former labelmate Lee Hyori starred in the music video for their debut single, "I Love You Even Though I Hate You". Many producers contributed to the album, including Cho Young-soo, Ahn Min-young, and Park Geun-tae.

== Promotion ==
Davichi chose not to appear in the music video for their debut single "I Love You Even Though I Hate You" and instead released a seven-minute-long mini drama directed by Cha Eun-taek. The plot of the music video was inspired by the movie Thelma & Louise. The song was produced by esteemed balladist Ryu Jae-hyun, who also produced several songs for artists such as Vibe, SG Wannabe, and F.T. Island.

Their next single, "Sad Promise" was re-released as a remixed dance single, giving the opportunity for Davichi to showcase a more lively side of themselves. The music video was a continuation of their previous release and again featured Lee Mi-yeon and Lee Hyori.

After a short break, a repackage of the album was released, titled, Vivid Summer Edition. The repackage included two new songs and a remix of previous single "Sad Promise". Singer Haha lent his vocals to the single "Love and War", an upbeat pop-dance song. On the music video of "Love and War", Ham Jae-hee (함재희) an actor, Hong Jin-young (홍진영) an actress and Song Ji-in (송지인) an actress appeared. The single became a hit and the duo was awarded number ones on Music Bank, M! Countdown, and Inkigayo.

== Track listing ==
From Naver Music.

| No. | Title | Lyrics | Music | Arrangements | Length |
|---|---|---|---|---|---|
| 1. | "I Love You Even Though I Hate You" ("미워도 사랑하니까") | Ryu Jae-hyun | Ryu Jae-hyun | Ryu Jae-hyun |
| 2. | "Putting on Lipstick" ("립스틱 짙게 바르고") | Ahn Young-min | Cho Young-soo | Cho Young-soo |
| 3. | "The Bad Me That's Hurt" ("나쁘고 아픈 나") | Wheesung, Lee Chae-kyu | Park Geun-tae | Lee Jong-hoon |
| 4. | "Sad Promise" ("슬픈 다짐") | Lee Seung-ho | Park Haeun | Park Hae-un |
| 5. | "Old Love" ("외사랑") | Kim Do-hoon, Hwang Sung-in | Lee Sang-ho [Fan], Kim Do-hoon | Lee Sang-ho [Fan] |
| 6. | "Sad Love Song" ("슬픈 사랑의 노래") | Ahn Young-min | Cho Young-soo | Cho Young-soo |
| 7. | "Starry Night" ("별이 빛나는 밤") | Ahn Young-min | Ahn Young-min | Seo Jae-ha |
| 8. | "Is That How It Is?" ("그런거니") | Min Myung-ki, Doh Hee-seon | Min Myung-ki | Park Dong-kyu |
| 9. | "Barely" ("겨우겨우") | Lee Hee-seung | Han Sung-ho | Moon Jung-kyu |
| 10. | "Opposite of Breaking Up" ("이별의 반대 말") | Kang Eun-kyung | Park Hae-un | Park Hae-un |

=== Vivid Summer edition ===
From Naver Music.

| No. | Title | Lyrics | Music | Arrangements | Length |
|---|---|---|---|---|---|
| 1. | "Water Bottle" ("물병") | Ahn Young-min | Ahn Young-min | Ahn Young-min | 3:55 |
| 2. | "Love and War (Narr. Haha)" ("사랑과 전쟁") | Ahn Young-min | Cho Young-soo | Cho Young-soo | 4:19 |
| 3. | "Sad Promise (Remix)" ("슬픈 다짐") | Lee Seung-ho | Park Hae-un | Park Hae-un | 3:44 |
