= Davichi =

South Korean pop duo

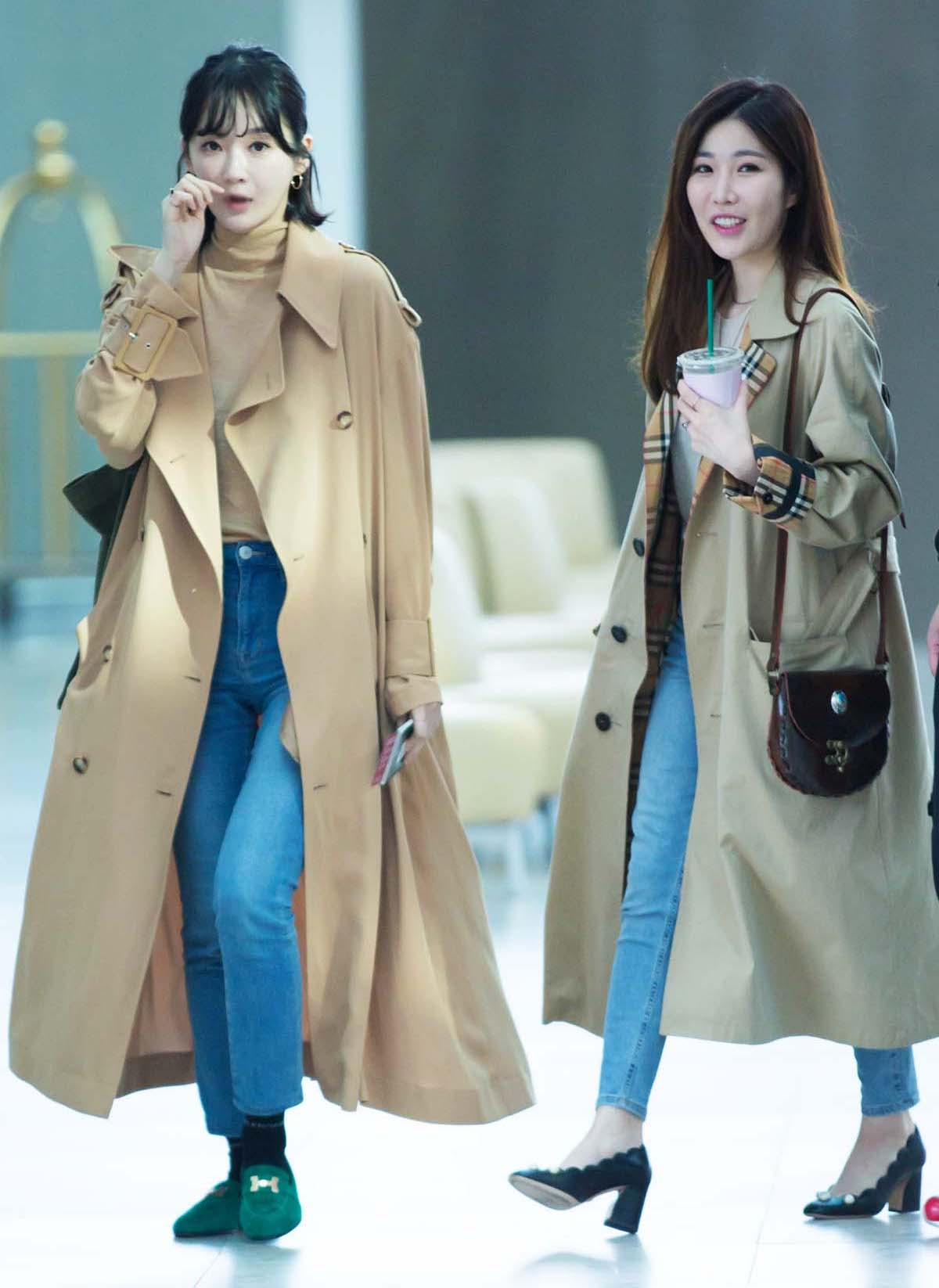
- Davichi in March 2018; Kang Min-kyung (left) and Lee Hae-ri (right)

Background information
- Origin: South Korea
- Genres: Pop; R&B
- Years active: 2008–present
- Labels: Core Contents; WakeOne; Cam With Us
- Members: Lee Hae-ri; Kang Min-kyung
- Website: Official website

Davichi (Korean: 다비치; RR: Dabichi) is a South Korean pop duo, formed in 2008, that consists of Lee Hae-ri and Kang Min-kyung.

The duo has released three studio albums and seven extended plays to date, and featured on several soundtracks for television dramas such as Big (2012), Iris II (2013), It's Okay, That's Love (2014), Descendants of the Sun (2016) and Moon Lovers: Scarlet Heart Ryeo (2016). Since their debut with the single "I Love You Even Though I Hate You", they have experienced consistent commercial success, with seven number-one singles in Korea. They have a less pop aesthetic than usually defines K-pop and Hallyu, focusing more on power ballads influenced with R&B. They have sold over 42 million digital singles, making them one of the best-selling girl groups.

== Name ==
Their name, "Davichi", is derived from the Korean phrase "shining over everything" (다 비치).

== Career ==
=== 2008–2010: Debut and breakthrough ===
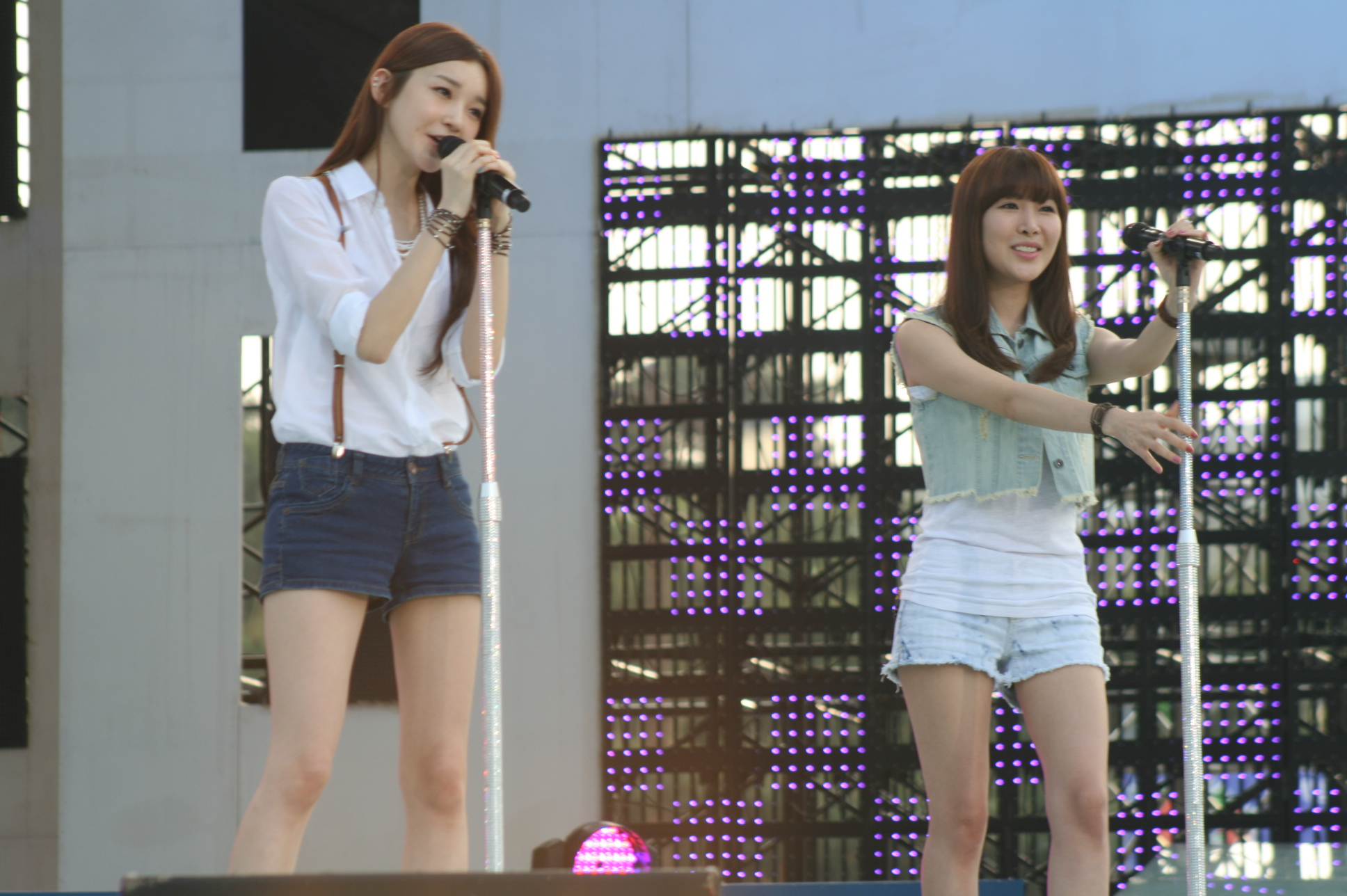
Davichi in May 2010

The duo released their debut studio album, Amaranth, on February 4, 2008. The promotional track "I Love You Even Though I Hate You" won the "Rookie of the Month" award for February at the Cyworld Digital Music Awards. The duo subsequently promoted the track "Sad Promise" from the album. On July 8, they released a repackaged edition of their first album titled Vivid Summer Edition, with "Love and War" as the promotional single.

In May 2008, Davichi was selected to participate in the special unit Color Pink, alongside members from Black Pearl and SeeYa, who were all part of Core Contents Media at the time. They released the single "Blue Moon", which also anonymously featured Hyomin and Hahm Eun-jung prior to their debut in T-ara. In the final months of 2008, Davichi won awards for "Best New Artist" at the Mnet Asian Music Awards, Golden Disk Awards, and the Seoul Music Awards.

On March 5, 2009, Davichi released the extended play Davichi in Wonderland, with the lead single "8282". The song proved to be popular among the general public and continued Davichi's chart success.

The following year on May 6, 2010, Davichi released their second EP, Innocence, with the lead single "Time, Please Stop". The music video to the lead single featured T-ara's Eun-jung.

=== 2011–2012: Love Delight ===
On August 16, 2011, it was announced that Davichi would be releasing their third extended play, Love Delight, later in the month. On August 27, it was revealed by Davichi's label, Core Contents Media, that the entire Love Delight album had been leaked on the internet. Despite the leak quickly making its way through internet portal sites, the company chose not to change the release date. Love Delight was released on August 29, along with the music video to their lead single, "Don't Say Goodbye". The song went on to chart at number one on Korea's Gaon Digital Chart and the Billboard K-Pop Hot 100 for three consecutive weeks.

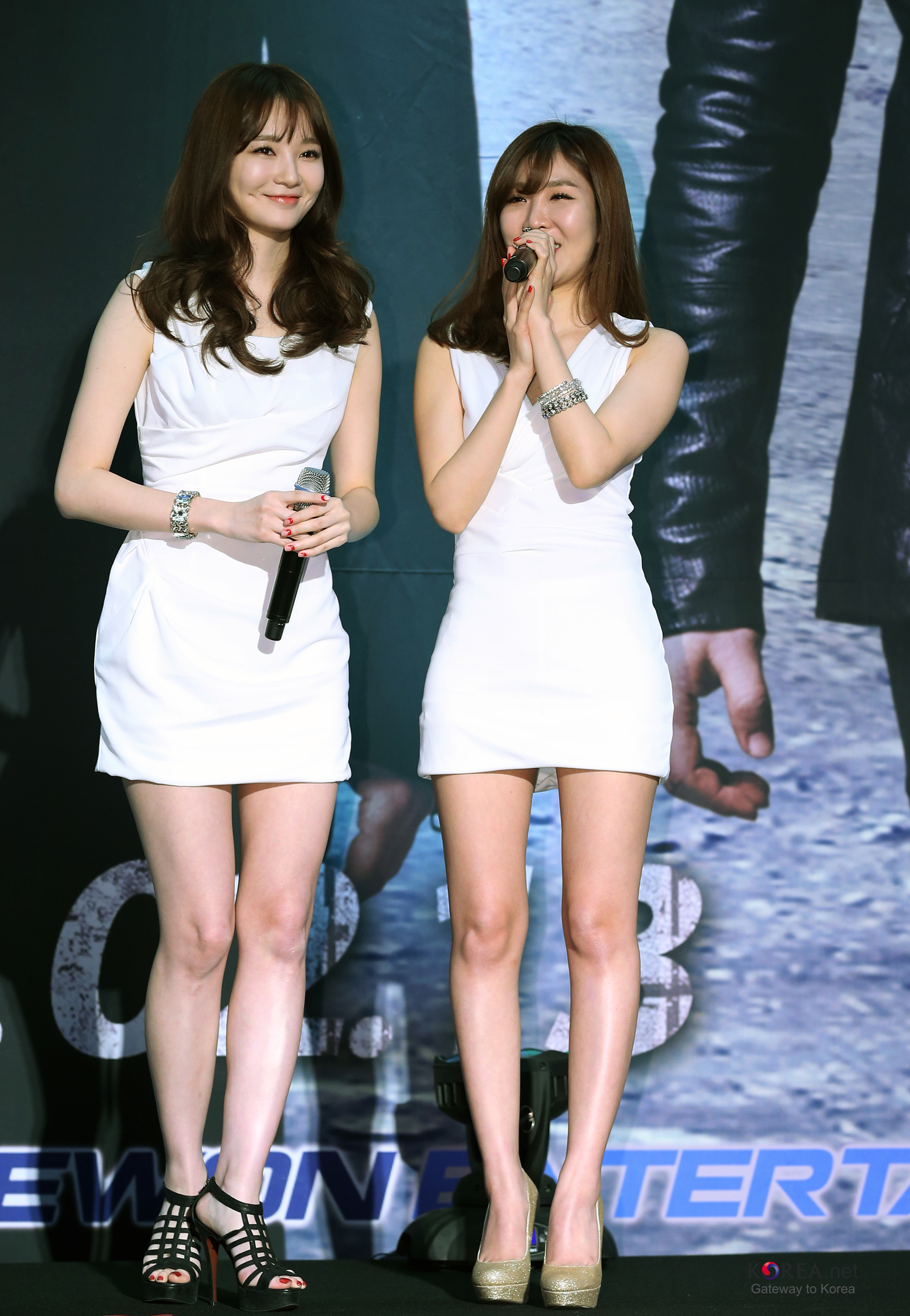
Davichi at the Iris II: New Generation press conference on February 7, 2013

On October 7, 2012, it was announced that the members of Davichi would be leaving their label to form an independent company. However, less than one month later, it was revealed that the duo had retracted their decision to leave Core Contents Media and renewed their contracts.

=== 2013–2014: Mystic Ballad, 6,7 and label changes ===
On March 3, 2013, the music video for the pre-release single "Turtle", from Davichi's second studio album Mystic Ballad, was released. The music video starred 5dolls's member Hyoyoung. "Turtle" went on to chart at number one on South Korea's Gaon Single Chart. On March 18, Davichi released the title track "Just the Two of Us", along with the full album, which featured collaborations with Duble Sidekick, Verbal Jint, Jung Suk-won, and Ryu Jae-hyun. Promotions for "Just the Two of Us" began on March 21 on M! Countdown. The single took the number one spot on M! Countdown, marking Davichi's fifteenth music show win.

On April 1, Davichi released the digital single "Be Warmed (feat. Verbal Jint)". The song was originally listed on the track listing for Mystic Ballad, but was taken out for unknown reasons. The song was met with instant success in South Korea. On June 27, Davichi released the digital single album Memories of Summer with the track "Because I Miss You Today", which was produced by Choi Kyu-sung.

On February 23, 2014, their contract with Core Contents Media reported had expired and decided not renewed the contract. It was soon later confirmed that the duo decided not to renewed their contract and plans to release a final studio album with the company as a 'parting gift'. On June 4, Davichi released new single "Again" produced by Brave Brothers. On June 18, their follow-up single "Pillow" was released earlier than originally scheduled to be released on June 19. The EP 6,7 was digitally released the day after, including the single "Again" and "Pillow". On July 3, Davichi released "Don't Move" as their last single under Core Contents Media.

On July 13, Davichi released It's Okay, That's Love, which was featured throughout the SBS drama It's Okay, That's Love. Shortly after that, on July 17, the duo signed an exclusive contract with CJ E&M.

=== 2015–2023: Davichi Hug, 50 x Half, &10 and Season Note ===
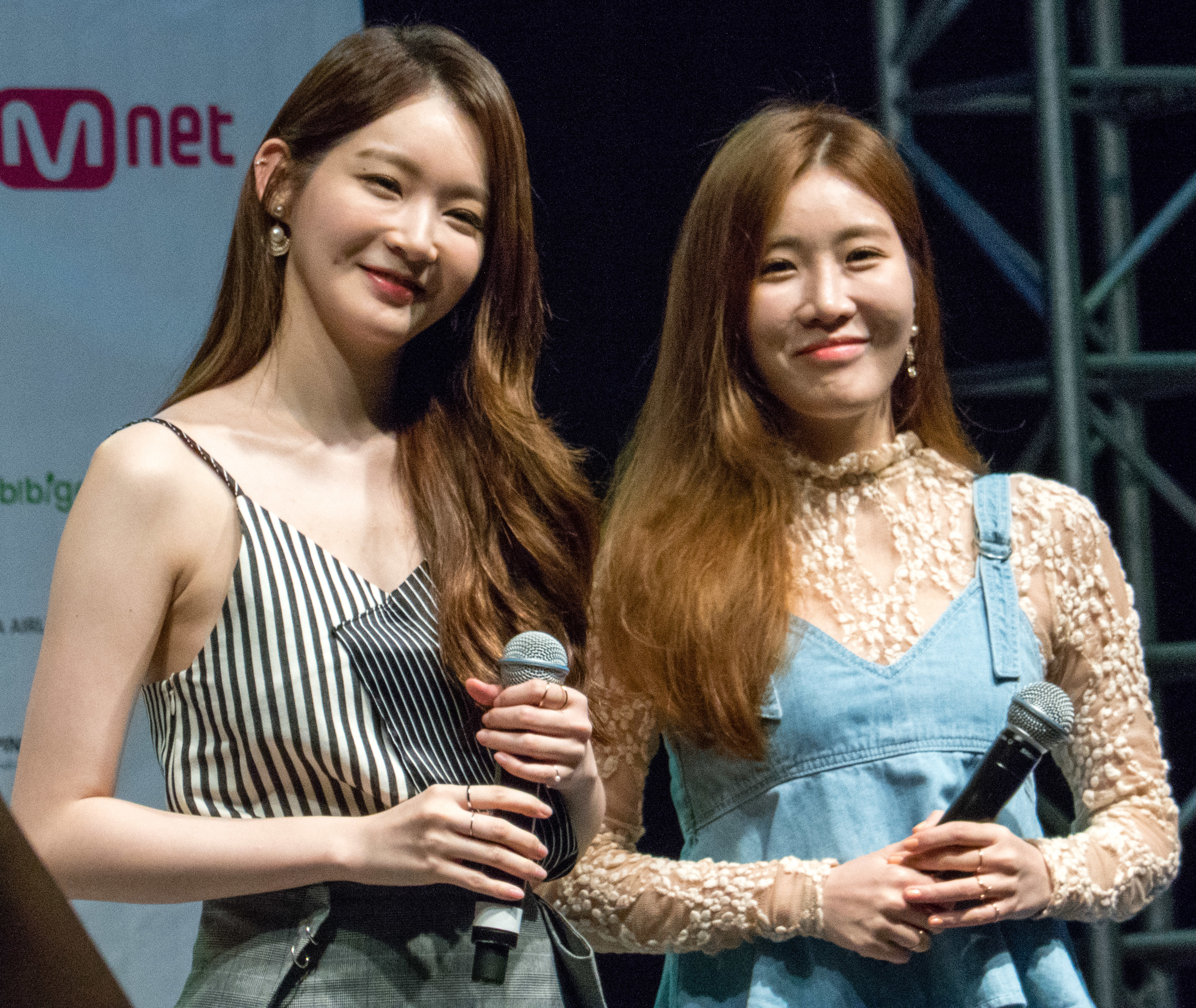
Davichi at KCON Los Angeles in July 2016

On January 21, 2015, Davichi released EP Davichi Hug including the two lead singles, "Crying Again" and "Sorry, I'm Happy" under CJ E&M label MMO Entertainment. On December 16, they released winter single WHITE featuring Jay Park, a remake song of Fin.K.L's White (1999). the duo hold their Year-end concert "Winter Hug" at Yonsei University on December 30 and 31.

Davichi released "This Love" for drama Descendants of the Sun on March 3, 2016 and shortly became huge popular soundtrack. Later that, they released "Forgetting You" for drama Moon Lovers: Scarlet Heart Ryeo on September 6. On October 13, their sixth EP 50 x Half was released with including double lead single "Beside Me" and "Love Is To Give". On October 28, Davichi announced their solo concert entitled "Davichi In Tempo <50 X HALF>" were held in Seoul at Yonsei University Grand Hall from December 30–31.

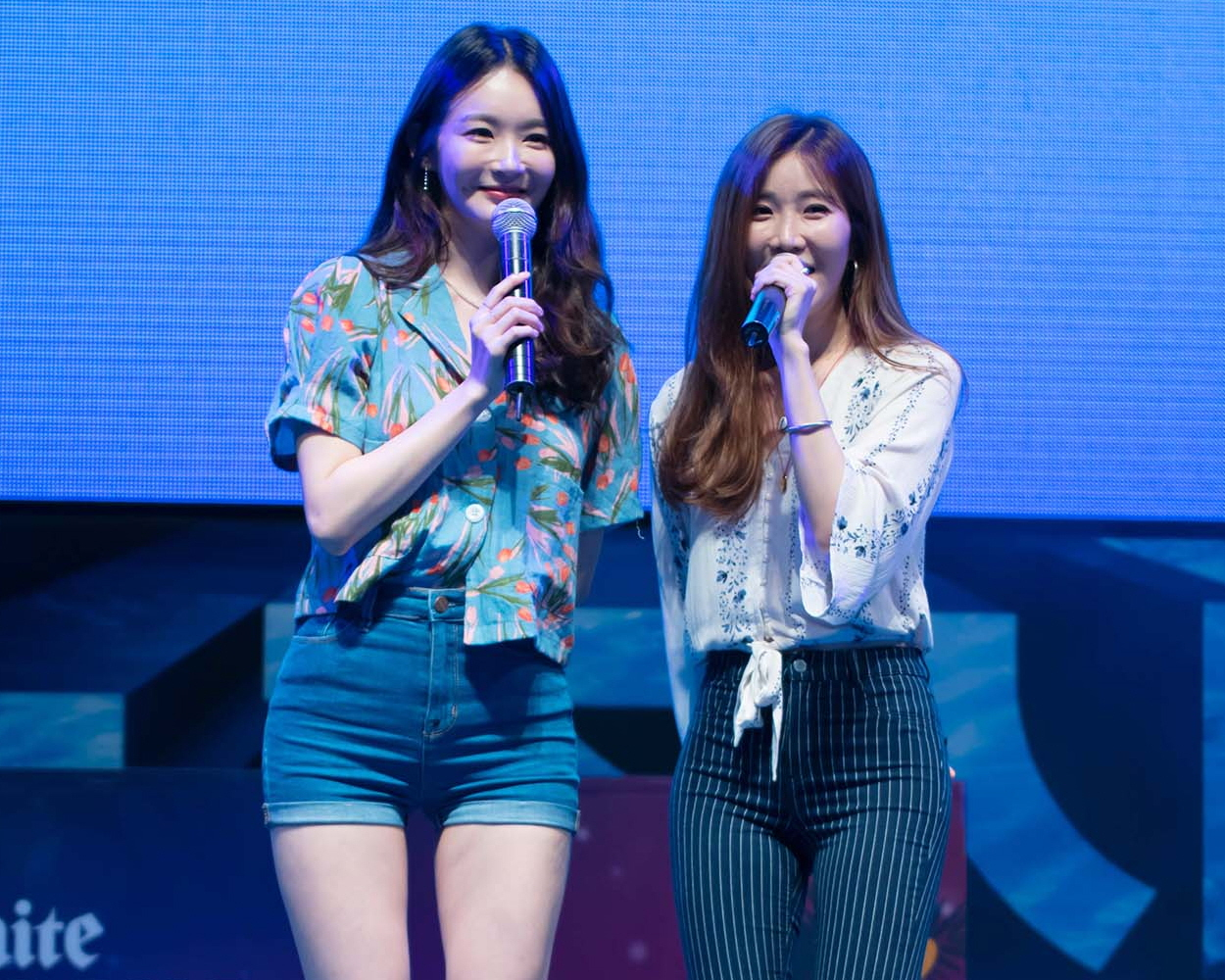
Davichi at OST & Greatest Hits Live in Singapore on January 8, 2017

On October 11, 2017, Davichi released their digital single "To Me". On December 15, 2017, Davichi announced their solo concerts entitled "Davichi La êve Concert 2017" would be held in Seoul at Yonsei University Grand Hall from December 23–24.

On January 16, 2018, CJ E&M label B2M Entertainment announced that Davichi would be releasing their third studio album to celebrate their 10-year anniversary. Davichi released their third studio album &10 on January 25 with the title track "Days Without You".

Davichi released single "Unspoken Words" on May 17, 2019. The song lyrics about the heart of a woman who still misses her lover after a breakup.

Davichi released new single "Just Hug Me" on April 12, 2021. The song was described as a mid-tempo ballad with lyrics about the woman who want her ex-lover to hug her warmly with a loving heart without any excuses or words at the moment we meet again after a breakup.

Davichi released new single "First Loss" on October 18, 2021. They later released the winter single "Everyday Christmas" on December 6, 2021.

Davichi released "Your Tender Heart Hurts Me" for soundtrack of drama Soundtrack #1 on January 20, 2022. They later released "Remember Me" for soundtrack of drama Our Blues on May 7, 2022. On May 16, 2022, their seventh extended play Season Note was released, with the lead single "Fanfare".

Davichi released their first self-composed single "A Very Personal Story" on November 15, 2023.

=== 2024–present: Label changes ===
Davichi released the spring single "I'll Be By Your Side" on March 26, 2024. Later that day, WakeOne (successor of CJ ENM's management) announced that Davichi would part ways with them after 10 years.

On September 10, Davichi signed with new label Cam With Us.

On October 16, 2025, Davichi released their new single "Time Capsule". On November 14, 2025, Davichi will hold the concert TIME CAPSULE: Connecting Time at the KSPO Dome in Olympic Park on January 24 and 25, 2026.

== Discography ==
- Amaranth (2008)
- Mystic Ballad (2013)
- &10 (2018)

== Concerts and tours ==
- Davichi 1st Concert "The Premiere" In Seoul (2009)
- Davichi Christmas Concert In Seoul (2010)
- Davichi Concert 'To Send' (2011)
- Davichi Concert 'Davichi Code' (2013)
- Davichi Concert 'Winter Hug' (2015)
- Davichi In Tempo <50 X HALF> (2016)
- Davichi OST & Greatest Hits Live In Singapore (2017)
- Davichi La êve Concert (2017)
- Davichi Live Tour '&10' (2018)
- Davichi Winter Party (2018)
- Davichi Concert In Taipei (2019)
- Davichi Concert In LA & San Francisco (2019)
- Davichi Concert 'DAVICHI CONCERT' (2019)
- Davichi Concert 'STARRY STARRY'(2023)
- Davichi Concert 'A Stitch in Time' (2025)
- Davichi Concert 'TIME CAPSULE: Connecting Time' (2026)

== Awards and nominations ==
Name of the award ceremony, year presented, category, nominee of the award, and the result of the nomination
Award ceremony	Year	Category	Nominee / work	Result	Ref.
Asia Model Awards	2013	BBF Popular Singer Award	Davichi	Won	
Brand Customer Loyalty Award	2020	Most Influential OST Artist	Davichi	Won	
Brand Customer Loyalty Award	2022	Best Female Group	Davichi	Won	
Circle Chart Music Awards (Note: Formerly known as the Gaon Chart K-Pop Awards)	2010	Best Selling Ringtone	"Women's Generation" (with T-ara)	Won	
Circle Chart Music Awards	2012	Artist of the Year (September)	"Women's Generation" (with T-ara)	Won	
Circle Chart Music Awards	2014	Artist of the Year (March)	"Turtle"	Won	
Circle Chart Music Awards	2014	Artist of the Year (June)	"The Letter"	Nominated	
Circle Chart Music Awards	2020	Artist of the Year – Digital Music (May)	“Unspoken Words”	Won	
Circle Chart Music Awards	2021	Artist of the Year – Digital Music (December)	"Dear."	Nominated	
Circle Chart Music Awards	2022	Artist of the Year – Digital Music (April)	"Just Hug Me"	Nominated	
Circle Chart Music Awards	2022	Artist of the Year – Digital Music (October)	"First Loss"	Nominated	
Cyworld Digital Music Awards	2008	Rookie of the Month (February)	"I Love You Even Though I Hate You"	Won	
Cyworld Digital Music Awards	2008	Song of the Month (July)	"Love and War"	Won	
Cyworld Digital Music Awards	2009	Song of the Month (March)	"8282"	Won	
Cyworld Digital Music Awards	2010	Bonsang Award	Davichi	Won	
Cyworld Digital Music Awards	2011	Song of the Month (September)	"Don't Say Goodbye"	Won	
Genie Music Awards	2018	Song of the Year	"Days Without You"	Nominated	
Genie Music Awards	2018	Vocal Track (Female)	"Days Without You"	Nominated	
Genie Music Awards	2018	Genie Music Popularity Award	Davichi	Nominated	
Golden Disk Awards	2008	Popularity Award	Davichi	Nominated	
Golden Disk Awards	2008	Rookie of the Year (Album Category)	Amaranth	Nominated	
Golden Disk Awards	2008	Rookie of the Year (Digital Category)	"Love and War"	Nominated	
Golden Disk Awards	2008	Digital Song Bonsang	"Love and War"	Nominated	
Golden Disk Awards	2008	Digital Song Bonsang	"Sad Promise"	Nominated	
Golden Disk Awards	2009	Popularity Award	Davichi	Nominated	
Golden Disk Awards	2009	Digital Daesang (Song of the Year)	"8282"	Nominated	
Golden Disk Awards	2009	Digital Song Bonsang	"8282"	Won	
Golden Disk Awards	2010	Digital Song Bonsang	"Please Stop Time"	Nominated	
Golden Disk Awards	2014	Popularity Award	Davichi	Nominated	
Golden Disk Awards	2014	Digital Daesang (Song of the Year)	"Turtle"	Nominated	
Golden Disk Awards	2014	Digital Bonsang Award	"Turtle"	Won	
Golden Disk Awards	2016	Digital Bonsang Award	"Two Lovers"	Nominated	
Golden Disk Awards	2016	Popularity Award	Davichi	Nominated	
Golden Disk Awards	2021	Curaprox Popularity Award	Davichi	Nominated	
Golden Disk Awards	2021	QQ Music Popularity Award	Davichi	Nominated	
Golden Disk Awards	2021	Digital Song Bonsang	Davichi	Nominated	
Golden Disk Awards	2022	Most Popular Artist Award	Davichi	Nominated	
Golden Disk Awards	2022	Digital Song Bonsang	"Just hug me"	Nominated	
MAMA Awards (Note: Formerly known as the Mnet Korean Music Festival and then Mnet Asian Music Awards.)	2008	Best New Female Group	"I Love You Even Though I Hate You"	Won	
MAMA Awards	2009	Best Female Group	"8282"	Nominated	
MAMA Awards	2010	Best Vocal Performance – Group	"Stop the Time"	Nominated	
MAMA Awards	2011	Best Vocal Performance – Group	"Don't Say Goodbye"	Nominated	
MAMA Awards	2012	Best Vocal Performance – Group	"Will Think Of You"	Won	
MAMA Awards	2012	Best Collaboration Performance	"We Were In Love"	Nominated	
MAMA Awards	2013	Best Vocal Performance – Female	"Turtle"	Nominated	
MAMA Awards	2013	Best Original Soundtrack	"Don't You Know"	Nominated	
MAMA Awards	2014	Best Original Soundtrack	"It's Okay, That's Love"	Nominated	
MAMA Awards	2015	Best Vocal Performance – Female	"Cry Again"	Nominated	
MAMA Awards	2016	Best Vocal Performance – Group	"Beside Me"	Won	
MAMA Awards	2016	Best Original Soundtrack	"This Love"	Nominated	
MAMA Awards	2019	Best Vocal Performance – Group	"Unspoken Words"	Nominated	
MAMA Awards	2020	Best Vocal Performance – Group	"Dear"	Nominated	
MAMA Awards	2020	Song of the Year	"Dear"	Nominated	
MAMA Awards	2021	Best Vocal Performance – Group	"Just Hug Me"	Nominated	
MAMA Awards	2021	Song of the Year	"Just Hug Me"	Nominated	
MAMA Awards	2022	Best Vocal Performance – Group	"Fanfare"	Nominated	
MAMA Awards	2022	Song of the Year	"Fanfare"	Nominated	
MAMA Awards	2024	Song of the Year	"A Very Personal Story"	Nominated	
MAMA Awards	2024	Best Vocal Performance – Group	"A Very Personal Story"	Nominated	
MAMA Awards	2025	Song of the Year	"Stitching"	Nominated	
MAMA Awards	2025	Best Vocal Performance – Group	"Stitching"	Won	
MAMA Awards	2025	Fans' Choice Top 10 – Female	Davichi	Nominated	
Melon Music Awards	2009	Bonsang Award (Top 10 Artists)	Davichi	Won	
Melon Music Awards	2009	Artist of the Year (Daesang)	Davichi	Nominated	
Melon Music Awards	2009	Song of the Year (Daesang)	"8282"	Nominated	
Melon Music Awards	2009	Song of the Year (Daesang)	"I Made a Mistake"	Nominated	
Melon Music Awards	2009	Song of the Year (Daesang)	"Women's Generation" (with T-ara)	Nominated	
Melon Music Awards	2009	Mobile Music Award	"Women's Generation" (with T-ara)	Nominated	
Melon Music Awards	2009	Album of the Year (Daesang)	Davichi in Wonderland	Nominated	
Melon Music Awards	2011	Best R&B/Ballad Award	"Don't Say Goodbye"	Nominated	
Melon Music Awards	2013	Bonsang Award (Top 10 Artists)	Davichi	Won	
Melon Music Awards	2014	Best OST Award	"It's Okay It's Love"	Nominated	
Melon Music Awards	2015	Best Ballad Award	"Two Lovers"	Nominated	
Melon Music Awards	2016	Best OST Award	"This Love"	Nominated	
Melon Music Awards	2020	Best Ballad	"Dear."	Won	
Seoul Music Awards	2008	New Artist Award	Davichi	Won	
Seoul Music Awards	2009	Main Award (Bonsang)	"8282"	Won	
Seoul Music Awards	2009	Daesang Award	"8282"	Nominated	
Seoul Music Awards	2019	QQ Music Most Popular K-Pop Artist Award	Davichi	Nominated	
Seoul Music Awards	2021	Main Award (Bonsang)	"Just Hug Me"	Nominated	
Seoul Music Awards	2021	K-wave Popularity Award	"Just Hug Me"	Nominated	
Seoul Music Awards	2021	Popularity Award	"Just Hug Me"	Nominated	
Seoul Music Awards	2022	Ballad Award	"Fanfare"	Nominated	
Seoul Music Awards	2022	OST Award	"Remember Me"	Nominated	

== See also ==
- List of best-selling girl groups

== Notes ==
Awards and achievements
Preceded by Wonder Girls	M.NET KM Music Festival - Best New Female Group/Artist; 2008	Succeeded by 2NE1
