= List of songs recorded by Momoland =

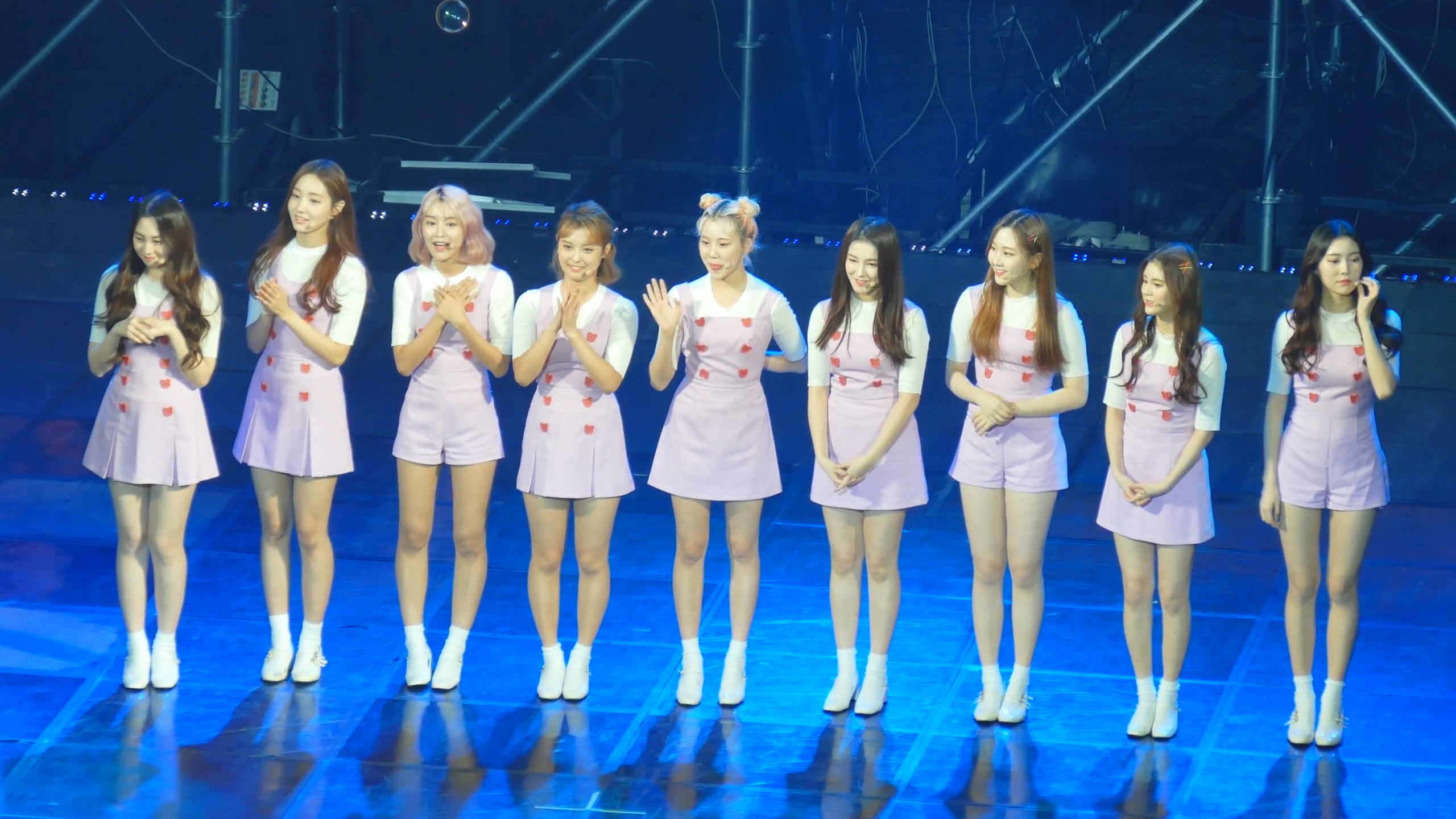
Momoland during the Hero Concert in Seoul on November 29, 2017.

The following is a list of songs recorded by South Korean girl group Momoland. The girl group has officially released 48 songs. (Note: 48 total songs consisting of: 33 songs originally recorded in Korean; 8 Japanese versions of songs originally recorded in Korean; 2 songs originally recorded in Japanese; 2 Korean versions of songs originally recorded in Japanese; 2 English versions of songs originally recorded in Korean; 1 song originally recorded English) 33 songs are originally recorded in Korean, 2 are originally in Japanese and 1 is originally in English. Additionally, 12 songs are versions of songs originally recorded in a different language.

The group composed of nine former members; Ahin, Daisy, Hyebin, Jane, JooE, Nancy, Taeha and Yeonwoo, was formed by Duble Kick Company in 2016 through the survival television show Finding Momoland and disbanded in 2023.

Key
†	Indicates a single release

== Songs originally recorded in Korean ==
List of songs, showing writers name, originating album and year released
Song	Writer(s)	Album	Year	Ref.
"Baam" (Note: The Japanese version was released in 2018.) †	Shinsadong Tiger; Beom-i; Nang-i	Fun to the World	2018	
"Banana Chacha"	Robin		2019	
"Bboom Bboom" (Note: The Japanese version was released in 2018.) †	Shinsadong Tiger; Beom-i; Nang-i	Great	2018	
"Bingo Game"	Monster Factory	Fun to the World	2018	
"Curious" (Note: The Japanese version was released as part of Chiri Chiri in 2019.)	Monster Factory; ATM	Great	2018	
"Dream Song" (꿈의 노래)	Irish Papaya	The All-Round Wife Original Soundtrack Part 2	2021	
"Falling U"	Byun Moo Hyuk	Show Me	2019	
"Fly"	Beverly Kidz; Yoon Seok	Great	2018	
"Freeze" (Note: The Japanese version was released as part of Chiri Chiri in 2019.) †	Duble Sidekick; Jinli	Freeze!	2017	
"Holiday"	Beverly Kidz; Yoon Seok	Show Me	2019	
"Hug Me"	Kam Dong is Goodchoisnet	Tempted OST Part.1	2018	
"I Like It"	1Take; Tenzo & Tasco	Freeze!	2017	
"I'm So Hot" (Note: The Japanese version was released in 2019.) †	Shinsadong Tiger; Beom-i; Nang-i	Show Me	2019	
"Jjan! Koong! Kwang!" †	Duble Sidekick; Tenzo & Tasco	Welcome to Momoland	2016	
"Khang Khang"	Yoon Myung-Sun	Sugarman 3, Episode.4	2019	
"Light Up"	Pinkmoon	Show Me	2019	
"Love is Only You"	Duble Sidekick; Seion; Black Edition		2019	
"Love Sick"	Duble Sidekick; Yokan	Welcome to Momoland	2016	
"Merry Go Round"	Bull$EyE; Ondine; JinDog; Kim Dodari	Ready or Not	2020	
"Oh-Gi-Yeo-Cha"	Duble Sidekick; Yokan; Taewoon	Welcome to Momoland	2016	
"Only One You" (Note: The Japanese version was released as part of Chiri Chiri in 2019.)	Monster Factory	Fun to the World	2018	
"Orgel"	JQ; Seong Hyeon Bae; Jinli	Freeze!	2017	
"Ready or Not" †	Psy; White99	Ready or Not	2020	
"Same Same"	Pinkmoon	Great	2018	
"Starry Night" (Note: The English version was released in 2020.) †	Bull$EyE real-fantasy Ondine; Kim Do Da Ri; Momoland	Starry Night	2020	
"Thumbs Up" (Note: The English version was released in 2019.) †	Duble Sidekick; Bull$EyE; Ondine; De view Kim Do Da Ri	Thumbs Up	2019	
"Tiki Taka"	Robin		2020	
"VeryVery"	Pinkmoon	Fun to the World	2018	
"Welcome to Momoland" (Note: The Japanese version was released as part of Chiri Chiri in 2019.)	Duble Sidekick; Yonghee	Welcome to Momoland	2016	
"What Planet are You From?"	Duble Sidekick; Jinli; Kim Su Jeong	Freeze!	2017	
"What You Want"	Big Bread; Judy	Show Me	2019	
"Wonderful Love" (Note: The Japanese version was released as part of Chiri Chiri in 2019.) †	Long Candy; Tenzo & Tasco; Duble Sidekick	Wonderful Love	2017	
"Wrap Me in Plastic"	Daniel Francis Stanfill; Johannes-Chane Becker; Marcus Layton		2021	

== Songs originally recorded in Japanese ==
List of songs, showing writers name, originating album and year released
Song	Writer(s)	Album	Year	Ref.
"Chiri Chiri" (Note: The Korean version was released as part of Starry Night in 2020.)	Bull$EyE real-fantasy Ondine	Chiri Chiri	2019	
"Pinky Love" (Note: The Korean version was released as part of Starry Night in 2020.) †	Bull$EyE real-fantasy Yoske; Alive Knob; Manbo	Chiri Chiri	2019	

== Songs originally recorded in English ==
List of songs, showing writers name, originating album and year released
Song	Writer(s)	Album	Year	Ref.
"Yummy Yummy Love" †	Moa "Cazzi Opeia" Carlebecker; Ellen Berg; Keepintouch	Non-album single	2022	
