= Momoland discography =

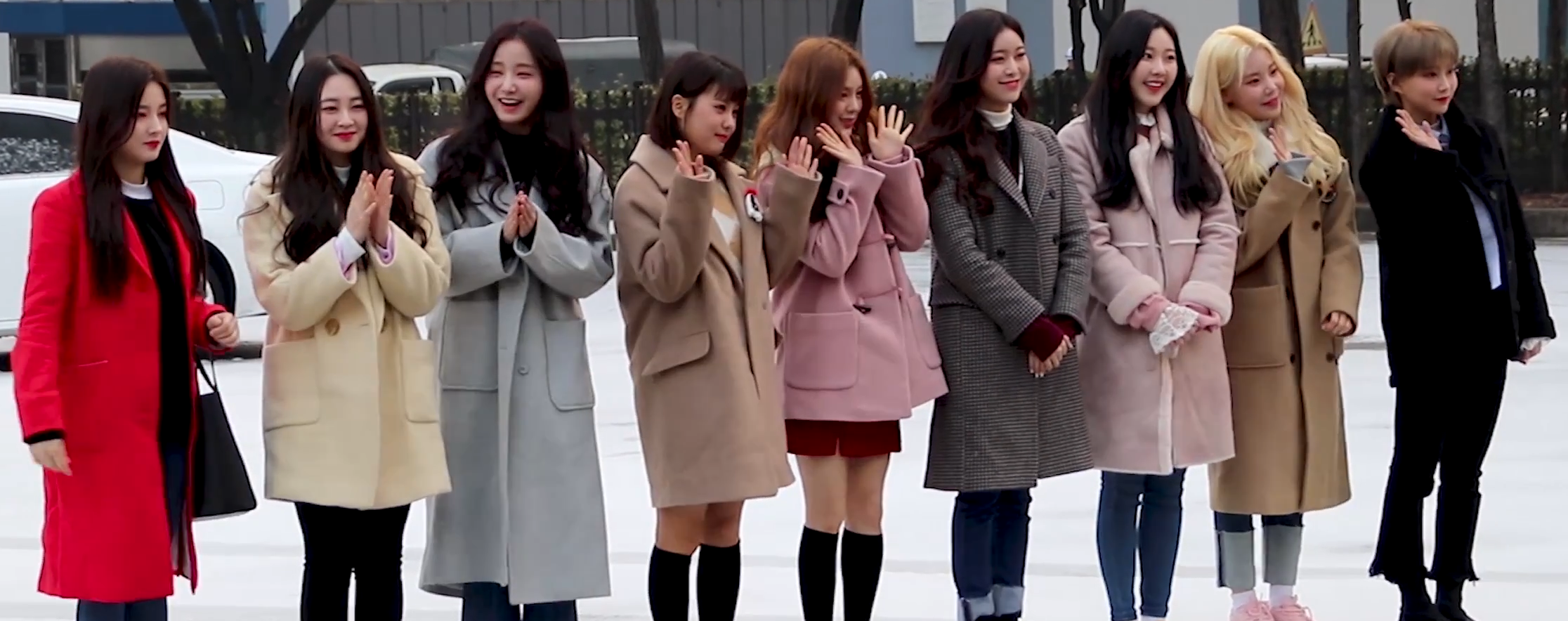
- Momoland at KBS Music Bank in February 2018
- Studio albums: 1
- EPs: 6
- Compilation albums: 1
- Singles: 17
- Music videos: 30
- Single albums: 3
- Promotional singles: 4

The discography of the South Korea-based girl group Momoland consists of one studio album, one compilation album, six extended plays, three single albums, seventeen singles, four promotional singles and thirty music videos.

Formed by MLD Entertainment in 2016 through the reality show Finding Momoland, Momoland debuted in November 2016 with the release of their first EP, Welcome to Momoland, and its single, "Jjan! Koong! Kwang!". In 2017, the group's first single album Wonderful Love and their second EP Freeze! were released. In January 2018, the group released their third EP, Great!, with the single "Bboom Bboom". The single became one of the best-selling singles in the Gaon Digital Chart in 2018. The group's fourth EP, Fun to the World, was later released in June 2018, with "Baam" becoming their second top thirteen hit in Gaon Digital Chart. In 2019, Momoland released the fifth EP, Show Me in March, and their second single album, Thumbs Up, in December. In 2020, their sixth EP, Starry Night was released in June, and their third single album, Ready or Not was released in November. In 2022, their collaboration single "Yummy Yummy Love" with Natti Natasha was released in January. In 2025, their first digital single since reuniting, and second overall, "Rodeo", was released in September.

In Japan, Momoland debuted in February 2018 with their compilation album, Momoland The Best ~Korean Ver.~. Their debut Japanese studio album, Chiri Chiri, was followed in September 2019, with the lead single "Pinky Love".

== Albums ==
=== Studio albums ===
List of studio albums, showing selected details, selected chart positions and sales figures
Title	Details	Peak chart positions		Sales
Title	Details	JPN Oricon	JPN Hot	Sales
Chiri Chiri	Released: September 4, 2019; Label: King; Formats: CD, digital download	30	49	JPN: 1,669

=== Compilation albums ===
List of compilation albums, showing selected details, selected chart positions and sales figures
Title	Details	Peak chart positions	Sales
Title	Details	JPN	Sales
Momoland The Best ~Korean Ver.~	Released: February 28, 2018; Label: Akatsuki, King; Formats: CD, digital download	26	JPN: 3,568

=== Single albums ===
List of single albums, showing selected details, selected chart positions and sales figures
Title	Details	Peak chart positions	Sales
Title	Details	KOR	Sales
Wonderful Love	Released: April 26, 2017; Label: Duble Kick Company; Formats: Kihno, digital download	—	—N/a
Thumbs Up	Released: December 30, 2019; Label: MLD Entertainment; Formats: CD, digital download	4	KOR: 5,688
Ready or Not	Released: November 17, 2020; Label: MLD Entertainment; Formats: CD, digital download	25	KOR: 3,524

== Extended plays ==
List of extended plays, showing selected details, selected chart positions and sales figures
Title	Details	Peak chart positions	Sales
Title	Details	KOR	Sales
Welcome to Momoland	Released: November 10, 2016; Label: Dublekick Company; Formats: CD, digital download	28	KOR: 1,915
Freeze!	Released: August 22, 2017; Label: Dublekick Company; Format: CD, digital download	17	KOR: 3,664
Great!	Released: January 3, 2018; Label: Dublekick Company; Formats: CD, digital download	3	KOR: 23,254
Fun to the World	Released: June 26, 2018; Label: MLD Entertainment (Note: On May 30, 2018, Dublekick Company changed their name to MLD Entertainment.); Formats: CD, digital download	6	KOR: 14,498
Show Me	Released: March 20, 2019; Label: MLD Entertainment; Formats: CD, digital download	7	KOR: 9,173
Starry Night	Released: June 11, 2020; Label: MLD Entertainment; Formats: CD, digital download	21	KOR: 4,817

== Singles ==
=== Korean singles ===
List of Korean singles, showing year released, selected chart positions, sales figures, music recording certifications and originating album
Title	Year	Peak chart positions			Sales (Note: Sales figures for tracks are based on digital downloads, except noted.)	Certifications	Album
Title	Year	KOR Circle	KOR Hot	US World	Sales	Certifications	Album
"Jjan! Koong! Kwang!" (짠쿵쾅)	2016	—	—N/a	—	—N/a	—N/a	Welcome to Momoland
"Wonderful Love" (어마어마해)	2017	—	—N/a	—	—N/a	—N/a	Wonderful Love
"Freeze" (꼼짝마)	2017	—	—	—	—N/a	—N/a	Freeze!
"Bboom Bboom" (뿜뿜)	2018	2	2	4	KOR: 2,500,000	KMCA: Platinum (Note: "Bboom Bboom" was certified platinum for 100 million streaming in August 2018 and for 2.5 million downloads in July 2019.)	Great!
"Baam"	2018	13	9	5	—N/a	—N/a	Fun to the World
"I'm So Hot"	2019	81	36	13	—N/a	—N/a	Show Me
"Thumbs Up"	2019	137	83	13	—N/a	—N/a	Thumbs Up
"Starry Night"	2020	— (Note: "Starry Night" did not enter the Gaon Digital Chart; it appeared at number 160 on the component Download chart.)	—	—	—N/a	—N/a	Starry Night
"Ready or Not"	2020	— (Note: "Ready or Not" did not enter the Gaon Digital Chart; it appeared at number 81 on the component Download chart.)	—	—	—N/a	—N/a	Ready or Not
"Rodeo"	2025	— (Note: "Rodeo" did not enter the Circle Digital Chart, but peaked at number 63 on the component Download Chart.)	—	—	—N/a	—N/a	Non-album singles
"White Spring"	2026	— (Note: "White Spring" did not enter the Circle Digital Chart, but peaked at number 76 on the component Download Chart.)	—	—	—N/a	—N/a	Non-album singles
"Still Valid"	2026	— (Note: "Still Valid" did not enter the Circle Digital Chart, but peaked at number 94 on the component Download Chart.)	—	—	—N/a	—N/a	Non-album singles
"—" denotes releases that did not chart or were not released in that region.

=== Japanese singles ===
List of Japanese singles, showing year released, selected chart positions, sales figures and originating album
Title	Year	Peak chart positions		Sales (Note: Sales figures for tracks are based on digital downloads, except noted.)	Album
Title	Year	JPN Oricon	JPN Hot	Sales	Album
"Bboom Bboom" (Note: "Bboom Bboom" (Japanese version) was released on June 13, 2018 as Momoland's first Japanese single.)	2018	4	9	JPN: 24,157 (Phy.)	Chiri Chiri
"Baam" (Note: "Baam" (Japanese version) was released on November 7, 2018 as Momoland's second Japanese single.)	2018	8	12	JPN: 13,513 (Phy.)	Chiri Chiri
"I'm So Hot" (Note: "I'm So Hot (Japanese version)" was released on May 8, 2019 as Momoland's third Japanese single.)	2019	8	51	JPN: 10,312 (Phy.)	Chiri Chiri
"Pinky Love"	2019	—	—	—N/a	Chiri Chiri
"—" denotes releases that did not chart or were not released in that region.

=== English singles ===
List of English singles, showing year released, selected chart positions and originating album
Title	Year	Peak chart positions	Album
Title	Year	KOR DL	Album
"Yummy Yummy Love" (with Natti Natasha)	2022	47	Non-album single

=== Promotional singles ===
List of promotional singles, showing year released, selected chart positions and originating album
Title	Year	Peak chart positions		Album
Title	Year	KOR DL	KOR Hot	Album
"Banana Chacha" (바나나차차) (Note: "Banana Chacha" is a Momoland's collaboration digital single. It was released on April 3, 2019 as a character song for the Korean animated series Pororo the Little Penguin.)	2019	—	87	Non-album singles
"Love Is Only You" (사랑은 너 하나) (with Erik)	2019	—	—	Non-album singles
"Tiki Taka" (티키타카) (Note: "Tiki Taka" is a Momoland's collaboration digital single. It was released on May 28, 2020 as a character song for the Korean animated series Pororo the Little Penguin.)	2020	—	—	Non-album singles
"Wrap Me in Plastic" (with Chromance)	2021	79	—	Non-album singles
"—" denotes releases that did not chart or were not released in that region.

== Soundtrack appearances ==
List of soundtrack appearances, showing year released and originating album
Title	Year	Album
"Hug Me" (안아줘)	2018	Tempted OST Part.1
"Dream Song" (꿈의 노래)	2021	The All-Round Wife OST Part.2

== Other album appearances ==
List of other album appearances, showing year released and originating album
Title	Year	Album
"Balloons" (풍선)	2018	Immortal Songs: Singing the Legend (Legendary Songs in Textbooks)
"Can Can" (캉캉)	2019	Two Yoo Project Sugar Man 3 Episode 4

== Videography ==
List of music videos, showing year released
Title	Year
"Jjan! Koong! Kwang!"	2016
"Jjan! Koong! Kwang!" (Dance version)	2016
"Wonderful Love"	2017
"Freeze"	2017
"Freeze" (Dance version)	2017
"Bboom Bboom"	2018
"Bboom Bboom" (Japanese version)	2018
"Bboom Bboom" (Japanese dance version)	2018
"Baam"	2018
"Baam" (Japanese version)	2018
"Baam" (Japanese dance version)	2018
"Baam" (Special version)	2018
"I'm So Hot"	2019
"I'm So Hot" (Japanese version)	2019
"Banana Chacha"	2019
"Banana Chacha" (MomolandxPororo version)	2019
"Love is Only You"	2019
"Pinky Love"	2019
"Thumbs Up"	2019
"Thumbs Up" (Performance version)	2020
"Tiki Taka"	2020
"Starry Night"	2020
"Ready or Not"	2020
"Ready or Not" (Performance version)	2020
"Merry Go Round"	2020
"Wrap Me in Plastic"	2021
"Wrap Me in Plastic" (Dance version)	2021
"Yummy Yummy Love"	2022
"Rodeo"	2025
"White Spring"	2026
"Still Valid"	2026
