= Nancy (singer) =

South Korean singer and actress (born 2000)

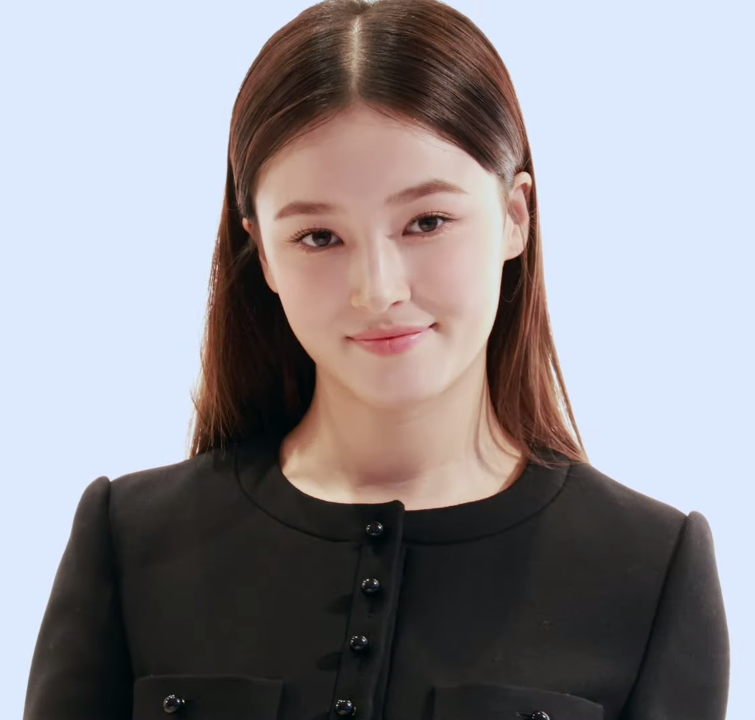
- Nancy in 2023
- Born: Nancy Jewel McDonie; April 13, 2000 (age 26); Daegu, South Korea
- Other names: Lee Seung-ri; Lee Geu-roo
- Citizenship: South Korea; United States
- Education: Hanlim Multi Art School – Musical Department
- Occupations: Singer; actress
- Agent: Sparkle
- Musical career
- Genre: K-pop
- Instrument: Vocals
- Years active: 2011–present
- Labels: MLD; Aria; ATOC; Inyeon Entertainment
- Member of: Momoland

Korean name
- Hangul: 이그루
- RR: I Geuru
- MR: I Kŭru

Nancy Jewel McDonie (born April 13, 2000), known professionally as Nancy (Korean: 낸시), is a South Korean and American singer and actress. She is a member of the South Korean girl group Momoland, which was formed on November 10, 2016, through the Mnet's reality survival show Finding Momoland.

== Early life ==
Nancy was born on April 13, 2000, in Nam District, Daegu, South Korea. In 2001, the family moved to her American father's hometown of Columbus, Ohio, where Nancy spent her early years and attended school. In an interview about her being of mixed origin and the product of two cultures Nancy said, "I have always been told by my parents that there are two cultures that I am in contact with ever since I was a child".

On March 20, 2019, it was reported that Nancy changed her Korean legal name to Lee Geu-roo from Lee Seung-ri.

=== Education ===
She graduated from Hanlim Multi Art School on February 9, 2018, where she was a student in the Musical Department.

== Career ==
=== Pre-debut ===
Nancy auditioned in Korea's Got Talent as part of a hip-hop group called "Cutie Pies" in 2011. The group reached the semi-finals.

As a teenager, she appeared in several TV programs, including The Unlimited, and also participated in Mak Ee Rae Show: Just Do It Expedition in 2012, in which she traveled to the Philippines and Saipan with South Korean actress Kim You-jung.

=== 2016: Finding Momoland, debut with Momoland, and Sunny Girls ===
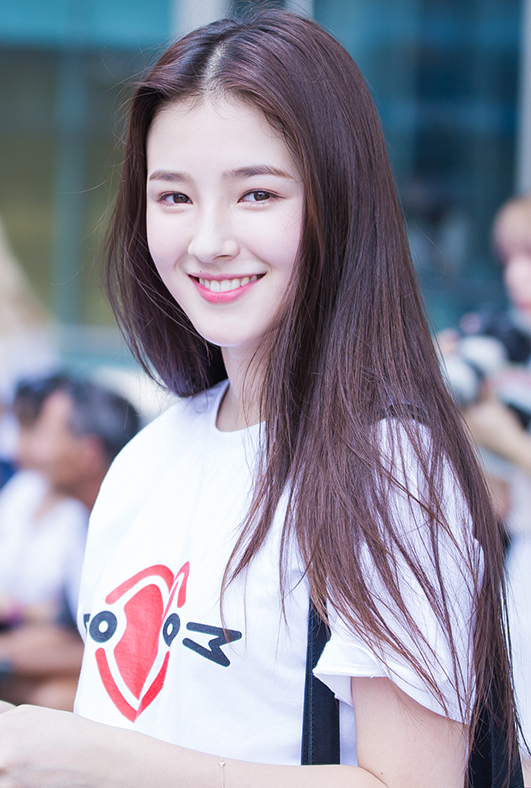
Nancy in 2016

In 2016, Nancy became a contestant on Mnet's reality survival show Finding Momoland to select the members of MLD Entertainment's new girl group Momoland. She finished the competition in first place, and had her debut with the group on November 10, 2016, with the mini-album Welcome to Momoland. Momoland made their debut stage performing at M Countdown.

On November 19, it was announced that she would join Inkigayo's project girl group Sunny Girls along with GFriend's Eunha, WJSN's Cheng Xiao, Oh My Girl's YooA and Gugudan's Nayoung. They made their official debut at SBS's Inkigayo stage, on November 27, with the title track "Taxi". The group also performed at the 2016 SBS Gayo Daejeon on December 26.

=== 2017–2024 ===
In 2017, Nancy was cast in the lead role with boy band ZE:A member Ha Min-woo in Naver TV's web music drama series Some Light. Nancy and Ha Min-woo also collaborated for the theme song of the drama series.

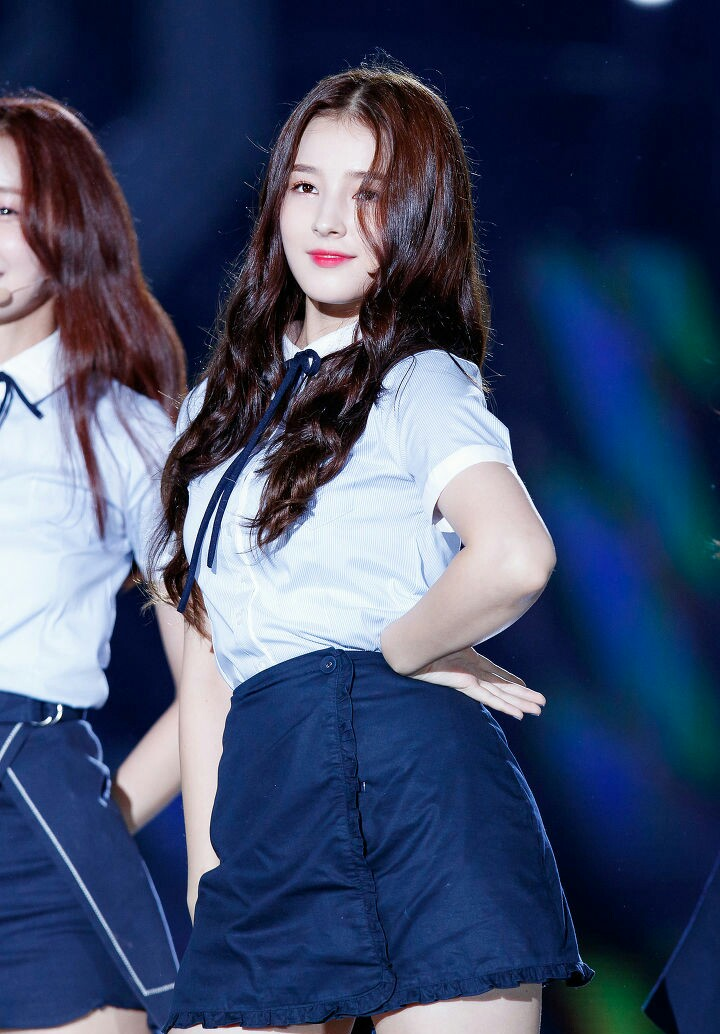
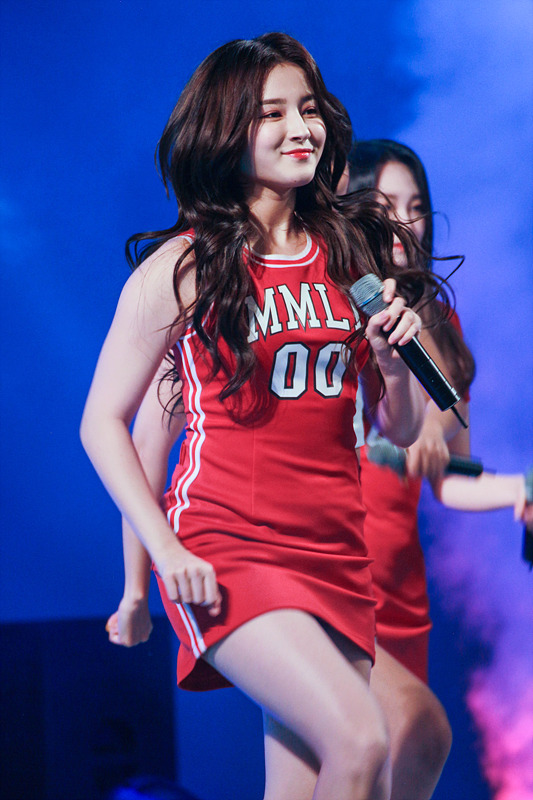
Nancy in 2017 and 2018

Nancy was selected to host the music show The Power of K alongside U-Kwon and Shownu. The show began airing in Japan and Korea in January 2018.

On January 3, 2018, Momoland released their third mini-album, Great!. As a result, the lead single, "Bboom Bboom", was a huge commercial success, reaching number two on the Gaon Digital Chart. On June 26, 2018, Momoland released their fourth mini-album Fun to the World with the lead single "Baam" becoming the 15th best-selling song of July 2018 on Gaon Music Chart.

In October 2018, Nancy appeared in episode 11 of MBC's Dae Jang Geum Is Watching, alongside her fellow-members JooE, Hyebin and Daisy as idol trainees.

On January 27, 2023, it was announced that Nancy, along with the Momoland members, departed from MLD Entertainment following expiration of the contracts. Momoland officially announced their disbandment on February 14. On March 4, Nancy announced that she signed a contract with Aria Diamond, a newly established talent agency affiliated with Aria Group, through her personal Instagram account. On September 17, Nancy revealed via Instagram that she is no longer an artist under Aria Group. On September 21, it was confirmed that Nancy has signed an exclusive contract with ATOC.

=== 2024–present ===
On April 1, 2024, Nancy signed with GMA Network's talent agency Sparkle. In October 2025, Nancy was cast in a K-pop-inspired thriller film, Perfect Girl, which was directed by Hong Won-ki of Zanybros and co-stars Adeleine Rudolph, Arden Cho, and Jeon Somi, marking her film debut.

== Other ventures ==
=== Endorsements ===
In January 2020, Nancy was chosen as the new endorsement model for the popular skincare brand Some By Mi.

== Personal life ==
In 2021, photos of Nancy undressing, which was secretly taken by a staff member backstage at the 2019 Asia Artist Awards in Vietnam, began circulating online. Nancy's then agency, MLD Entertainment, stated that the incident had left her "mentally distressed" and announced that they would file criminal and civil lawsuits against those who secretly filmed her and those who distributed the photos. The Asia Artist Awards Organizing Committee issued apology to Nancy and accepted responsibility for the incident, stating, "We will continue to cooperate with Nancy's agency, MLD Entertainment, and closely monitor the situation". The incident sparked debates about voyeurism in South Korea and sexual objectification in the K-pop industry.

== Discography ==
=== Soundtrack appearances ===
Title	Year	Peak chart positions	Album
Title	Year	KOR Gaon	Album
"Some Light" (with Ha Min-woo of ZE:A)	2017	—	Some Light OST
"—" denotes a recording that did not chart

== Filmography ==
=== Films ===
Key
†	Denotes films that have not yet been released

Year	Title	Role	Notes	Ref.
TBA	Perfect Girl †	TBA	Filming	

=== Television series ===
Year	Title	Role	Notes	Ref.
2018	Dae Jang Geum Is Watching	Idol trainee	Cameo (1 episode)	
2027	Palace Land	Ji Seul-gi		

=== Web series ===
Year	Title	Role	Notes	Ref.
2017	Some Light	Nancy	Music drama	

=== Television shows ===
Year	Title	Role	Notes	Ref.
2010	Hangul Train Chipo	Herself	As a kid	
2011	Korea's Got Talent	Contestant		
2011–2013	The Unlimited Show	Herself	Season 2–5	
2012	Mak Ee Rae Show: Just Do It Expedition	Cast member		
2014	Olala School 2	Cast member		
2016	Finding Momoland	Contestant		
2017	Idol Acting Competition	Cast member		
2017–2018	Pops in Seoul	Co-host		
2018–2020	Idol Star Athletics Championships	Contestant		
2020	King of Mask Singer	Contestant	As Jingle Bells	
2021	Godiva Show	Contestant		

=== Hosting ===
Year	Title	Notes	Ref.
2019	4th Asia Artist Awards	with Leeteuk, Ahn Hyo-seop and Lim Ji-yeon	
2019	8th Gaon Chart Music Awards	with Kim Jong-kook	
2022	Fly High K-Pop Concert	with Arin	

== Theatre ==
Year	Title	Role	Notes	Ref.
2023	The Show! Shilla	Lee Chae-rin / Princess Seung-man		
2025	Comrade	Jung Ji-yeon		
