= Momoland The Best ~Korean Ver.~ =

Compilation album by Momoland

Compilation album by Momoland
- Released: February 28, 2018
- Recorded: 2016–2017
- Genre: K-pop
- Language: Korean
- Label: King

Momoland chronology
Momoland The Best ~Korean Ver.~ (2018)	Chiri Chiri (2019)

Momoland The Best ~Korean Ver.~ is a compilation album by South Korean girl group Momoland. It was released by King Records on February 28, 2018. The album features the group's songs from their first two extended plays Welcome to Momoland and Freeze!; along with their sophomore single "Wonderful Love" and its EDM version.

Commercially, the album peaked at number twenty-six on Japan's Oricon Albums Chart.

== Commercial performance ==
In Japan, the compilation album debuted and peaked at number twenty-six on the Oricon Albums Chart. It sold 2,745 physical copies.

== Track listing ==
Standard edition
No.	Title	Lyrics	Music	Arrangement	Length
1.	"Welcome to Momoland" (from Welcome to Momoland, 2016)	Duble Sidekick; Yonghee	Jake K; Andreas Oberg; Skylar Mones	Jake K	3:26
2.	"Freeze" (꼼짝마, from Freeze!, 2017)	Duble Sidekick; Jinli	Duble Sidekick; WiiKeed; Jinli; Glory Face	WiiKeed; Glory Face	3:12
3.	"Jjan! Koong! Kwang!" (짠쿵쾅, from Welcome to Momoland, 2016)	Duble Sidekick; Tenzo & Tasco	Tenzo & Tasco; Seion	Tenzo & Tasco	3:19
4.	"Orgel" (오르골, from Freeze!, 2017)	JQ; Seong Hyeon Bae; Jinli	Glory Face; Duble Sidekick; Jinli; Jake K	Glory Face; Jake K	3:27
5.	"Oh-Gi-Yeo-Cha" (어기여차, from Welcome to Momoland, 2016)	Duble Sidekick; Yokan; Taewoon	Duble Sidekick; Yokan; Taewoon	Full8loom	3:33
6.	"Wonderful Love" (어마어마해, from Wonderful Love, 2017)	Duble Sidekick; Tenzo & Tasco; Long Candy	Duble Sidekick; Long Candy; The Cannels	Tenzo & Tasco	3:16
7.	"Love Sick" (상사병, from Welcome to Momoland, 2016)	Duble Sidekick; Yokan	Duble Sidekick; Yokan; Jake K	Yokan; Jake K	3:56
8.	"What Planet Are You From?" (너, 어느별에서 왔니, from Freeze!, 2017)	Duble Sidekick; Jinli; Kim Su Jeong	Yokan	Yokan	3:39
9.	"I Like It" (좋아, from Freeze!, 2017)	1Take; Tenzo & Tasco	Tenzo & Tasco; 1Take		3:10
10.	"Wonderful Love" (어마어마해 EDM ver.)	Duble Sidekick; Tenzo & Tasco; Long Candy	Duble Sidekick; Long Candy; The Cannels	Myo	3:19

DVD limited edition
No.	Title	Length
1.	"Jjan! Koong! Kwang!" (music video)	3:26
2.	"Jjan! Koong! Kwang!" (music video dance ver.)	3:22
3.	"Wonderful Love" (music video)	3:17
4.	"Wonderful Love" (EDM ver., dance practice video)	3:19
5.	"Freeze" (music video)	3:38
6.	"Freeze" (music video dance ver.)	3:17

== Charts ==
Chart performance for Momoland The Best ~Korean Ver.~
Chart (2018)	Peak position
Japan (Oricon Albums Chart)	26

== Release history ==
Release history of Momoland The Best ~Korean Ver.~
Region	Date	Format	Label
Japan	February 28, 2018	CD; digital download; streaming	King
Various	February 28, 2018	Digital download; streaming	King
