= Pops in Seoul =

- Genre: Music
- Country of origin: South Korea
- Original language: English

Original release
- Network: Arirang TV

Pops in Seoul, airing from 1998 to 2021, has presented Korean popular music for the past twenty-two years on the network Arirang TV. The show's VJ presented current music, news about K-pop culture, and provided overseas viewers with the latest Korean pop music and information. Former host Daniel of DMTN was caught up in a drug scandal and as a result, stepped down March 13, 2013, being replaced by BtoB's Peniel. On August 18, 2013, Wonder Girls member Woo Hye-rim became the show's newest host. On March 10, 2014, Lim officially stepped down from her duties and was succeeded by five new hosts.

Each day of the week featured different segments, including new music videos, and a closer look at stars on Mondays with Skarf's leader Tasha, the latest K-pop news and a look back at past music on Tuesdays with Nak Hun, up-and-coming stars on Wednesdays with Electroboyz's 1kyne, an interview with top stars on Thursdays with Blady's Coco (in which they pick their own questions), and the top 20 songs of the week on Fridays with Sam Ku. On June 4, 2018, Samuel became host of the show. On July 1, 2019, Felix Lee of Stray Kids took over as the new host. A.C.E's Kim Byeongkwan was the last MC from January 6, 2020 to March 31, 2021.

The final episode of this series aired on March 31, 2021 to conclude the program. The show is available on Viki, with subtitles in multiple languages.

== Programmes ==
On 13 September 2012 boy band 100%, label mates of T.O.P Media Teen Top, was the first featured group new segment, 'New Star.com'.

- Soy - 2006
- Isak - 2009
- NS Yoon-G - 2011
- Daniel (DMTN)
- Peniel (BtoB) - March 2013- August 2013
- Woo Hye-lim (Wonder Girls) - August 2013 – March 2014
- Nancy (Momoland) - March 2017 – June 2018
- Samuel - June 2018 – July 2019
- Felix (Stray Kids) - July 2019 – January 2020
- Kim Byeongkwan (A.C.E) - January 2020 – 31st March 2021

== See also ==
- Music programs of South Korea
- SBS Inkigayo
- KBS Music Bank
- MBC Show! Music Core
- Mnet M Countdown
- Arirang TV Simply K-Pop (formerly called The M-Wave and Wave K)
- JTBC Music On Top
- JTBC Music Universe K-909
- MBC M Show Champion
- SBS M The Show
