= Ready or Not (Momoland song) =

2020 single by Momoland

Single by Momoland

from the album Ready or Not
- Language: Korean
- B-side: "Merry Go Round"
- Released: November 17, 2020
- Recorded: 2020
- Genre: Dance-pop; Teen pop
- Length: 3:20
- Label: MLD Entertainment; Sony Music
- Songwriters: Psy; White99
- Lyricists: Alexander Karlsson; Alexej Viktorovitch; Louise Lindberg
- Producer: JeL

Momoland singles chronology
"Starry Night" (2020)	"Ready or Not" (2020)	"Yummy Yummy Love" (2022)

Music video
- "Ready or Not" on YouTube

"Ready or Not" is a song recorded by South Korean girl group Momoland. It was released on November 17, 2020 by MLD Entertainment and distributed by Sony Music as the group's single from their third single album of the same name. The track was written by Psy and White99, with JeL credited as the producer.

The accompanying music video for the song was uploaded onto MLD Entertainment's YouTube channel simultaneously with the single's release. To promote the single, the group performed on several South Korean music show programs, such as M Countdown and Inkigayo. Commercially, "Ready or Not" peaked at number eighty-one on South Korea's Gaon Download Chart and at number twenty-five on the Gaon Album Chart.

== Composition ==
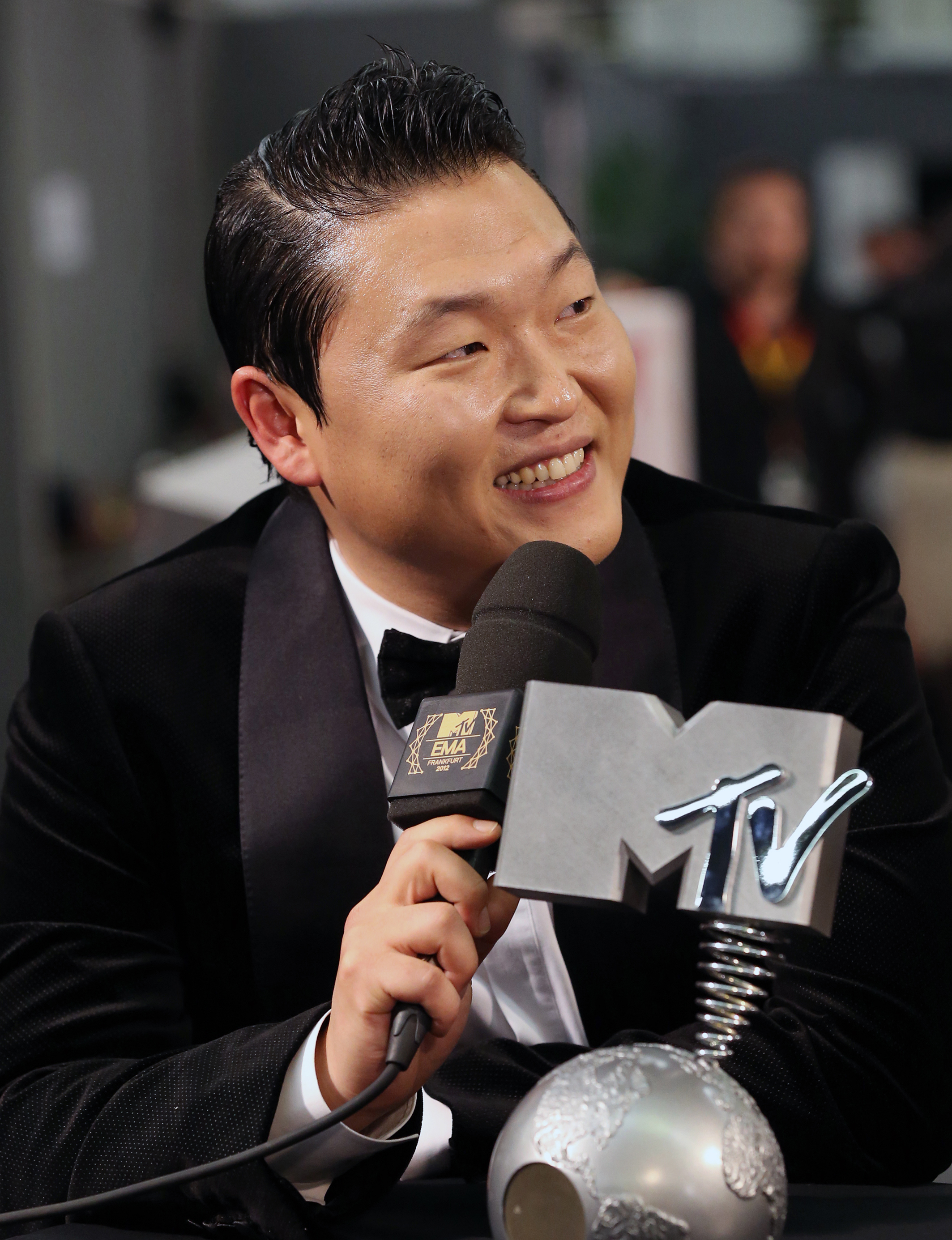
Psy lyricist of "Ready or Not" (pictured in 2012).

"Ready or Not" is a dance teen pop song. Cara Emmeline Garcia of GMA Network stated the song "shows the members' charms and confidence with its saxophone hook and upbeat." South Korean singer Psy served as a lyricist on the song along with White99. The composition of the song was made by Alexander Karlsson, Alexej Viktorovitch and Louise Lindberg. The song was produced by JeL.

== Background and release ==
Momoland released their sixth extended play Starry Night with its lead single of the same title in June 2020. Following the release of "Starry Night", MLD Entertainment announced on October 19, 2020 that the group would be making their comeback in their fourth anniversary in November 2020.

Prior to the release of "Ready or Not", teasers featuring photos of Momoland from the single album's photoshoot, and clips from the music video were released online in November 2020. The song was officially released on November 17, 2020 by MLD Entertainment and distributed by Sony Music as the group's third single album. The instrumental of "Ready or Not" was included in the single album as the third track. The dance practice video was uploaded on December 3, 2020.

"Merry Go Round", a new mid-tempo R&B track was also added in the single album, as the second track. It was composed and written by Bull$EyE, Ondine, Jindog and Kim Do Da Ri and produced by Bull$EyE and Jindog. A music video for the song was released on December 8, 2020.

== Critical reception ==
Seoul Beats stated the song "marks the beginning of a newer and mature Momoland." Kristie Chan of The Kraze Magazine complimented the rapping of Nancy and JooE, by making the song "more catchy."

== Commercial performance ==
In South Korea, "Ready or Not" debuted and peaked in the Gaon Download Chart at number eighty-one on the week of November 21, 2020. While the single album entered at number twenty-five in the Gaon Album Chart. It was the eighty-first best-selling album for the month November 2020 with 3,524 sales sold.

== Music videos ==
A scene in the music video where Momoland's Jane appears in a pastel-colored room.

The music video for "Ready or Not" was uploaded to MLD Entertainment's official YouTube channel on November 17, 2020, in conjunction with the release of the single. The video features bright and pastel colors. Kristie Chan of The Kraze Magazine stated the theme of the video, outfits and the set are reminiscent of 1980's pop. Seoul Beats described the video as "simple" and "it forgoes a fun narrative and offbeat concept in an attempt to step away from the group's quirkier image."

A "performance" version of the music video was published on November 24, 2020.

== Live performances ==
Momoland promoted "Ready or Not" by performing on several music programs in South Korea including Inkigayo, M Countdown, Music Bank, The Show, Show Champion, Show! Music Core and Simply K-Pop. In December 2020, Momoland performed the song on the 2020 KBS Gayo Daechukje and 2020 SBS Gayo Daejeon.

== Track listing ==
Digital download / streaming
No.	Title	Lyrics	Music	Arrangement	Length
1.	"Ready or Not"	Psy; White99	Alexander Karlsson; Alexej Viktorovitch; Louise Lindberg	JeL	3:20

Ready or Not - single album
No.	Title	Lyrics	Music	Arrangement	Length
1.	"Ready or Not"	Psy; White99	Alexander Karlsson; Alexej Viktorovitch; Louise Lindberg	JeL	3:20
2.	"Merry Go Round"	Bull$EyE; Ondine; Jindog; Kim Do Da Ri	Bull$EyE; Ondine; Jindog; Kim Do Da Ri	Bull$EyE; Jindog	3:17
3.	"Ready or Not" (instrumental)		Alexander Karlsson; Alexej Viktorovitch; Louise Lindberg	JeL	3:20
Total length:					6:57

== Charts ==
Chart performance for "Ready or Not"
Chart (2020)	Peak position
South Korea (Gaon Album Chart)	25
South Korea (Gaon BGM Chart)	81
South Korea (Gaon Download Chart)	81

== Credits and personnel ==
Credits adapted from Melon.

- Momoland – vocals
- Alexander Karlsson – composer
- JeL – arrangement
- Louise Lindberg – composer
- Psy – lyricist
- Alexej Viktorovitch – composer
- White99 – lyricist

== Release history ==
Release dates and formats for "Ready or Not"
Region	Date	Format	Label
South Korea	November 17, 2020	CD; digital download; streaming	MLD Entertainment; Sony Music
Various	November 17, 2020	Digital download; streaming	MLD Entertainment; Sony Music
