= Bboom Bboom =

2018 single by Momoland

Single by Momoland

from the EP Great!
- Language: Korean; Japanese
- B-side: "Welcome to Momoland"
- Released: January 3, 2018
- Recorded: 2017
- Genre: K-pop; electropop; electro swing
- Length: 3:28
- Label: Duble Kick Company; LOEN Entertainment (South Korea); King Records (Japan)
- Songwriters: Shinsadong Tiger; Beom x Nang
- Producer: Shinsadong Tiger

Momoland singles chronology
"Freeze" (2017)	"Bboom Bboom" (2018)	"Baam" (2018)

Japanese CD single cover

Music video
- "Bboom Bboom" on YouTube

"Bboom Bboom" (Korean: 뿜뿜; RR: Ppumppum, stylized as "BBoom BBoom") is a song recorded by South Korean girl group Momoland. It was released on January 3, 2018, by Duble Kick Company and distributed by LOEN Entertainment as the lead single from the group's third extended play Great!. The Japanese version of the song was released by King Records on June 13, 2018. The track was written by Shinsadong Tiger and Beom x Nang with Shinsadong Tiger credit as the producer.

The accompanying music video for the song was uploaded onto 1theK's YouTube channel simultaneously with the single's release. To promote the single, the group performed on several South Korean music show programs, such as M Countdown and Inkigayo. Commercially, "Bboom Bboom" became the group's first hit, peaking at number two on the Gaon Digital Chart. It was also the first girl group song to earn a platinum certification from Gaon Music Chart.

== Composition ==
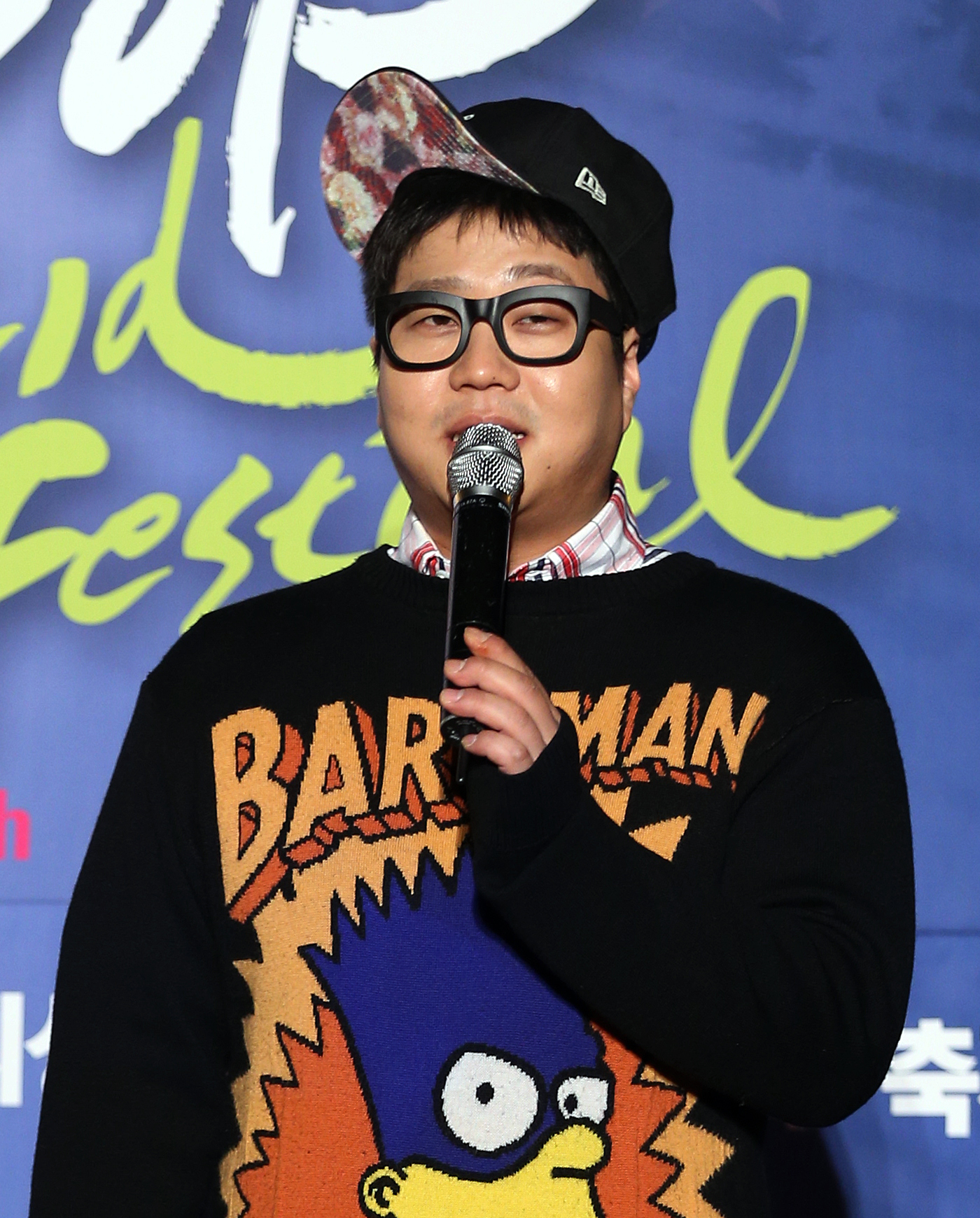
Shinsadong Tiger composer and lyricist of "Bboom Bboom" (pictured in 2013).

"Bboom Bboom" is a dance-pop and electro swing song. It was composed and written by Shinsadong Tiger and Beom x Nang. Shinsadong Tiger was credited as the producer. It is written in a key of E♭ minor and has a 126 beats per minute.

== Background and release ==
Momoland released their second extended play Freeze! with its lead single of the same name in August 2017. Following the release of "Freeze", a demo track for "Bboom Bboom" was presented by Shinsadong Tiger to Lee Hyung-Jin, the chief executive officer of Duble Kick Entertainment. The track was rejected by Momoland who refused to perform it. As a result, the song went through several revisions.

Prior to the release of the song, teasers featuring photos of Momoland from the extended play's photoshoot, a snippet of the song and clips from its music video were released online in December 2017. The song was officially released on January 3, 2018, by Duble Kick Entertainment and distributed by Kakao M as the group's fourth single. It served as the lead single of their third extended play, Great!. An instrumental of the song was included in the extended play as the fifth track. The dance practice video was uploaded on January 8, 2018.

The Japanese version was released on June 13, 2018, by King Records. It was included in the 2019 release of the group's debut studio album, Chiri Chiri.

== Critical reception ==
Jacques Peterson of Idolator ranked "Bboom Bboom" as one of the ten "best" K-pop songs of 2018, describing it as the "most fun song" of the year. Paper included the song in their "Top 20 K-Pop Songs of 2018". Dazed also included the song in their "20 best K-pop songs of 2018", stating the song "brought a sense of fun and absurdity back to K-pop". BuzzFeed included the song in their "30 Songs that Helped Define K-Pop in 2018" for its "iconicness". Seoul Beats stated the song is "catchy and has a wacky approach to instrumentation that isn’t common in current hits." The Kraze Magazine stated Yeonwoo's bridge section "exudes so much sexiness."

== Commercial performance ==
In South Korea, "Bboom Bboom" debuted at number forty-eight on the Gaon Digital Chart the week of January 20, 2018. It became Momoland's first song to enter the Gaon Music Chart. In its second week, it rose at number eighteen. The song peaked in March 2018 at number two. It was certified platinum by Gaon Chart in August 2018, for achieving 100 million streams. The song was the second to receive a platinum certification, and the first by a female artist from Gaon Chart.

In Japan, the song debuted and peaked at number four on the Oricon Singles Chart in its first week. In its second week, it dropped to number twenty. It was the seventeenth highest selling single for the month of June 2018, with 22,178 physical copies sold. While the song peaked at number nine on the Billboard Japan Hot 100. It also placed at number sixty-two at Billboard Japan Hot 100 Year End chart, and placed at number seventy-six in Top Streaming Songs.

== Music videos ==
A scene in the music video where Momoland's Daisy is depicted in a parody of a home shopping television show.

The music video for "Bboom Bboom" was uploaded to 1theK's official YouTube channel on January 3, 2018, in conjunction with the release of the single. The video features the group in a parody of a TV shopping channel. Seoul Beats described the choreography as "fun." The video went viral. It was ranked 3rd in YouTube Rewind's "Top 10 Most Popular Music Videos In Korea From 2018." In April 2021, the video hit the five-hundred million mark for YouTube views.

The music video for the Japanese version of the song was uploaded to J-Rock's official YouTube channel on May 16, 2018. A "dance" version of the music video was published on June 25, 2018.

== Live performances ==
Momoland promoted "Bboom Bboom" by performing on several music programs in South Korea including Inkigayo, M Countdown, Music Bank, The Show, Show Champion, Show! Music Core and Simply K-Pop.

== Track listing ==
Digital download / streaming
No.	Title	Lyrics	Music	Arrangement	Length
1.	"Bboom Bboom" (뿜뿜)	Shinsadong Tiger; Beom x Nang	Shinsadong Tiger; Beom x Nang	Shinsadong Tiger	3:28

Bboom Bboom - EP
No.	Title	Lyrics	Music	Arrangement	Length
1.	"Bboom Bboom" (Japanese version)	Shinsadong Tiger; Beom x Nang	Shinsadong Tiger; Beom x Nang	Shinsadong Tiger	3:28
2.	"Welcome to Momoland" (Japanese version)	Duble Sidekick; Yonghee	Jake K; Andreas Oberg; Skylar Mones	Jake K	3:27
3.	"Bboom Bboom" (Japanese version instrumental)		Shinsadong Tiger; Beom x Nang	Shinsadong Tiger	3:28
4.	"Welcome to Momoland" (Japanese version instrumental)		Jake K; Andreas Oberg; Skylar Mones	Jake K	3:27
Total length:					13:50

== Controversies ==
The same month the song was released, Russian girl group Serebro accused Momoland of plagiarizing their song "Mi Mi Mi" with "Bboom Bboom". Shinsadong Tiger denied the allegations, saying "the bass line [is] commonly heard in retro house or electro swing genres, as well as the 4-stanza chord."

== Charts ==
=== Weekly charts ===
Weekly chart performance for "Bboom Bboom"
Chart (2018)	Peak position
Japan (Billboard Japan Hot 100)	9
Japan (Oricon Singles Chart)	4
South Korea (Gaon Digital Chart)	2
South Korea (Kpop Hot 100)	2
US World Digital Songs (Billboard)	4

=== Year-end charts ===
Yearly chart performance for "Bboom Bboom"
Chart (2018)	Position
Japan (Billboard Japan Hot 100)	62
South Korea (Gaon Digital Chart)	4

== Accolades ==
The song was nominated for first place on the music show Inkigayo for twelve consecutive weeks. It won in MBC Plus X Genie Music Awards 2018 in the category Dance Track (Female).

=== Music program awards ===
Music program awards for "Bboom Bboom"
Program	Network	Date	Ref.
M Countdown	Mnet	January 11, 2018	
M Countdown	Mnet	February 22, 2018	
Show Champion	MBC M	January 31, 2018	
The Show	SBS MTV	February 6, 2018	
Music Bank	KBS	February 23, 2018	
Inkigayo	SBS	March 11, 2018	
Inkigayo	SBS	April 8, 2018	

== Certifications ==
Region	Certification	Certified units/sales
South Korea (KMCA)	Platinum	2,500,000^{*}
Streaming
South Korea (KMCA)	Platinum	100,000,000^{†}
^{*} Sales figures based on certification alone.^{†} Streaming-only figures based on certification alone.

== Credits and personnel ==
Credits adapted from Melon.

- Momoland – vocals
- Beom x Nang – composer, lyricist
- Shinsadong Tiger – composer, lyricist, arrangement

== Release history ==
Release dates and formats for "Bboom Bboom"
Version	Region	Date	Format	Label
Korean	Worldwide	January 3, 2018	Digital download; streaming	Duble Kick Entertainment; Kakao M
Japanese	Worldwide	June 13, 2018	CD single; digital download; streaming	King

== See also ==
- List of certified songs in South Korea
- List of Inkigayo Chart winners (2018)
- List of M Countdown Chart winners (2018)
