= Baam =

2018 single by Momoland

Single by Momoland

from the EP Fun to the World
- Language: Korean; Japanese
- B-side: "Only One You"
- Released: June 26, 2018
- Recorded: 2018
- Genre: K-pop; electropop; electro swing
- Length: 3:28
- Label: MLD; Kakao M (Korean); King (Japanese)
- Songwriters: Shinsadong Tiger; Beom x Nang
- Producer: Shinsadong Tiger

Momoland singles chronology
"Bboom Bboom" (2018)	"Baam" (2018)	"I'm So Hot" (2019)

Japanese CD single cover

Music video
- "Baam" on YouTube

"Baam" (stylized in all caps) is a song recorded by South Korean girl group Momoland. It was released on June 26, 2018 by MLD Entertainment and distributed by Kakao M as the lead single from the group's fourth extended play, Fun to the World. The Japanese version of the song was released by King Records on November 7, 2019. The track was written by Shinsadong Tiger and Bum x Nangi, with Shinsadong Tiger credited as the producer.

The accompanying music video for the song was uploaded onto 1theK's YouTube channel simultaneously with the single's release. To promote the single, the group performed on several South Korean music show programs, such as M Countdown and Inkigayo. Commercially, "Baam" peaked at number thirteen on South Korea's Gaon Digital Chart.

== Composition ==
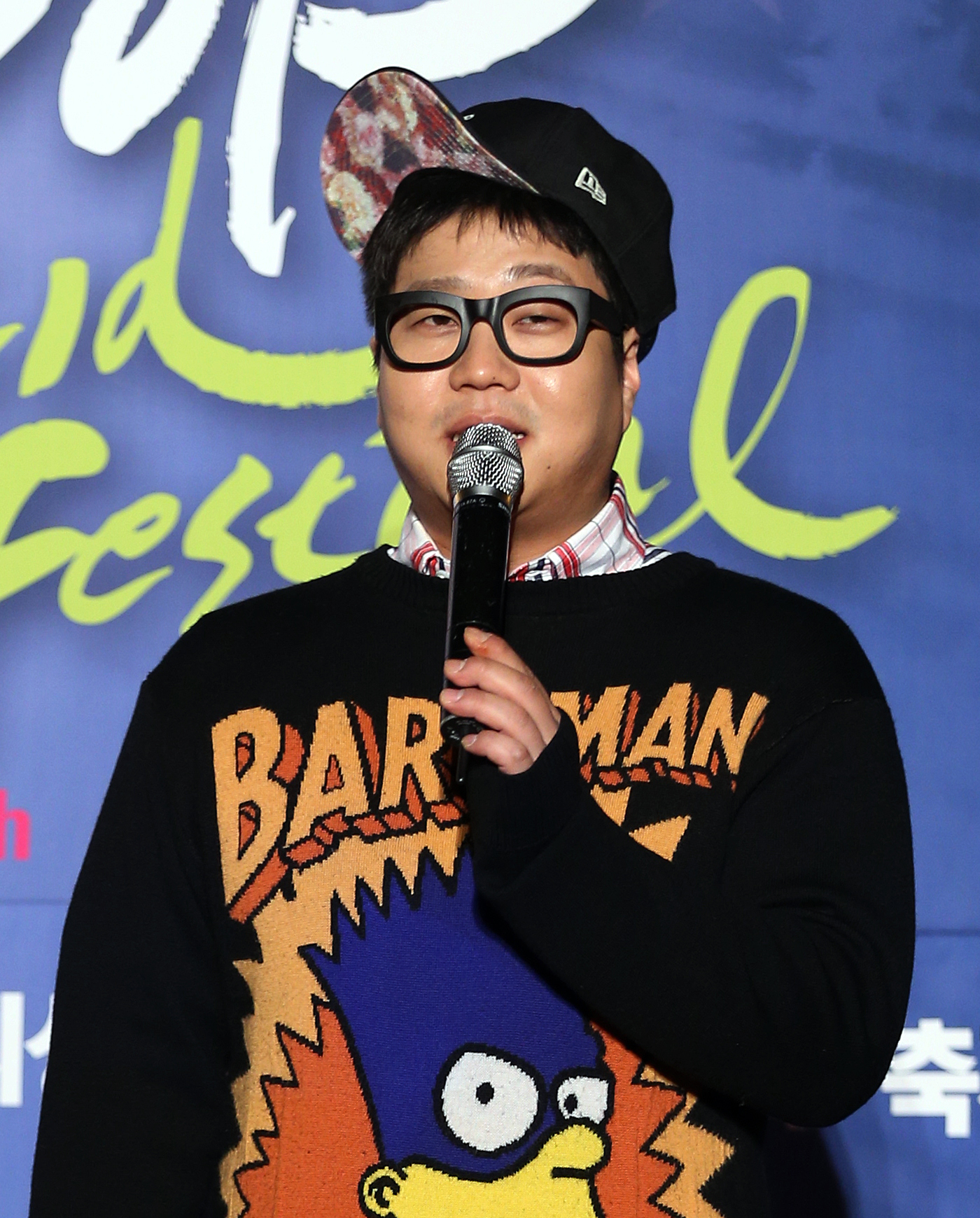
Shinsadong Tiger composer and lyricist of "Baam" (pictured in 2013).

"Baam" is a K-pop, electropop and electro swing song. The song was composed and written by Shinsadong Tiger, Bum (Lee Gil-beom) and Nangi (Jwa Haeng-suk).

== Background and release ==
Momoland released their third extended play Great! in January 2018, with its lead single "Bboom Bboom" which became a hit single. Following the success of "Bboom Bboom", it was announced on May 24, 2018 by MLD Entertainment that the group would be returning on June 26, 2018 with a dance track produced by Shinsadong Tiger.

Prior to the release of "Baam", teasers featuring photos of Momoland from the extended play's photoshoot, a snippet of the song and clips from its music video were released online in June 2018. The song was officially released on June 26, 2018 by MLD Entertainment and distributed by Kakao M as the group's fifth single. It served as the lead single of their fourth extended play, Fun to the World. An instrumental of the song was included in the extended play as the fifth track. The dance practice video was uploaded on July 2, 2018.

The Japanese version was released on November 7, 2018. It was included in the 2019 release of the group's debut studio album, Chiri Chiri.

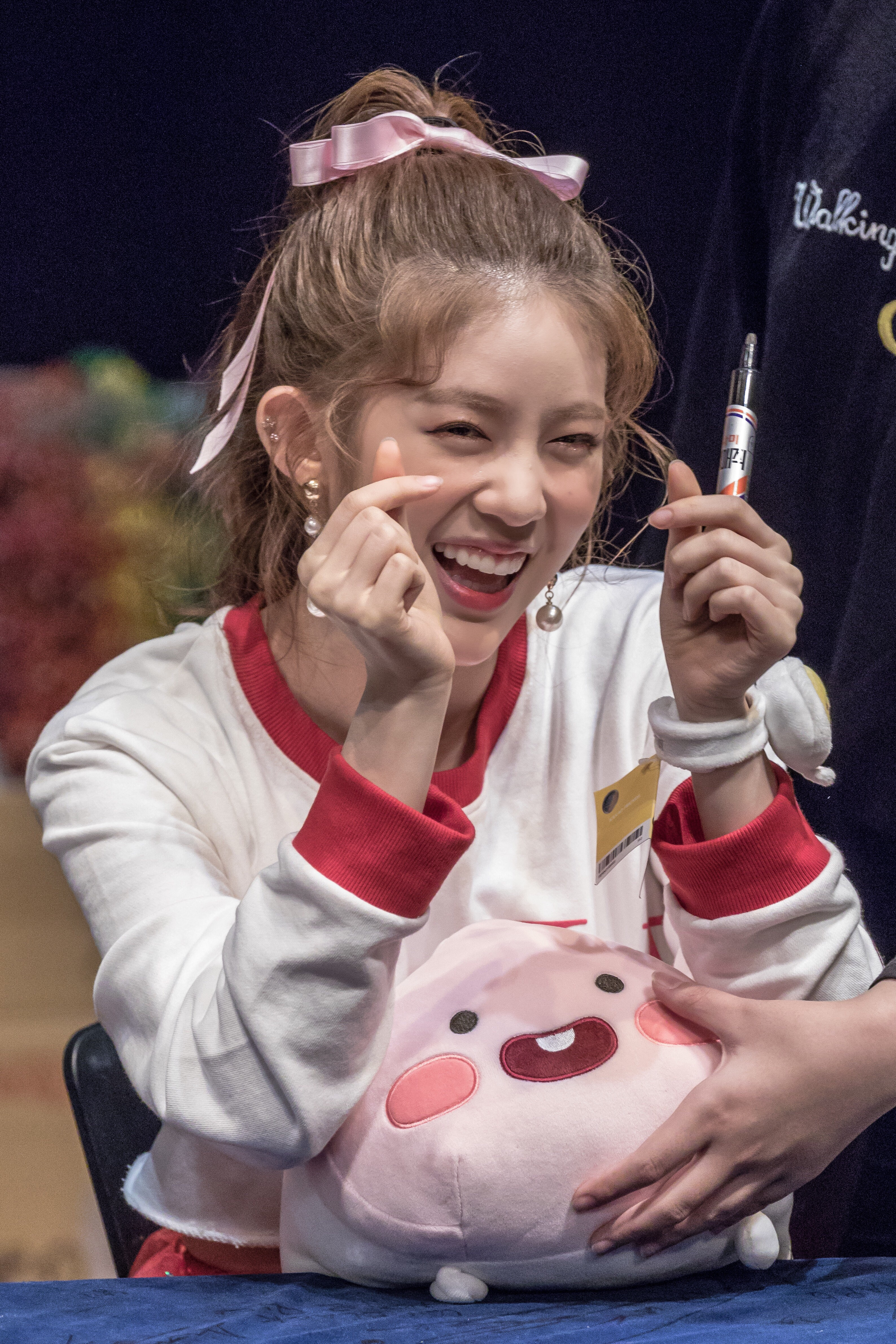
"Baam" serves as the group's final single to feature Daisy (pictured in 2018).

"Baam" is the final single of Momoland to feature members Daisy and Taeha, who left the group in 2020 and 2019 respectively.

== Critical reception ==
Seoul Beats stated the song is an "improvement" compare to the group's previous single "Bboom Bboom", and called it a "knockout." Kelly Sipko of The Kraze Magazine said the "vintage pop sound hooks up instantly before exploding into a strong, groovy tenor saxophone line."

== Commercial performance ==
In South Korea, "Baam" debuted at number twenty-seven on the Gaon Digital Chart, for the week of June 30, 2018. In its second week, the song rose to number fifteen and to number fourteen in its third week. In its fourth week, the song peaked at number thirteen. The song was the fifteenth best-selling song of July 2018. The song was also the twentieth best selling for August, fifty-third for September and ninety-second for October.

In Japan, the Japanese version of "Baam" debuted and peaked at number eight on the Oricon Singles Chart, with 12,126 physical copies sold in its first week. On the Billboard Japan Hot 100, it peaked at number twelve. The song also debuted at number eight on Billboard Japan's Top Singles Sales with 13,665 estimated sales.

== Music videos ==
A scene in the music video where Momoland's Jane, Daisy and Yeonwooappears in a backdrop depicting Vietnam, whilst wearing the traditional Vietnamese áo dài.

The music video was uploaded to 1theK's official YouTube channel on June 26, 2018, in conjunction with the release of the single. The video features the group in backdrops depicting countries around the world, including the Philippines, Korea, Vietnam, France, Mexico, Egypt and the United States. Seoul Beats said the choreography is the "stand out" of the video, but criticized the video for "few poorly thought-out moments that run the risk of overshadowing everything else." Kelly Sipko of The Kraze Magazine said the "juxtaposition of the contemporary choreography set against the vintage settings makes for such an interesting concept." It was the ninth most viewed music video in YouTube for a South Korean artist in 2018, that was released in the same year. A performance version of the music video was published on July 17, 2018.

The music video for the Japanese version of the song was uploaded to J-Rock's official YouTube channel on October 5, 2018. A dance version of the music video was published on November 19, 2018.

== Live performances ==
Momoland promoted "Baam" by performing on several music programs in South Korea including Inkigayo, M Countdown, Music Bank, The Show, Show Champion, Show! Music Core and Simply K-Pop.

== Track listing ==
Digital download / streaming
No.	Title	Lyrics	Music	Arrangement	Length
1.	"Baam"	Shinsadong Tiger; Beom x Nang	Shinsadong Tiger; Beom x Nang	Shinsadong Tiger	3:28

Baam EP
No.	Title	Lyrics	Music	Arrangement	Length
1.	"Baam" (Japanese version)	Shinsadong Tiger; Beom x Nang	Shinsadong Tiger; Beom x Nang	Shinsadong Tiger	3:28
2.	"Only One You" (Japanese version)	Monster Factory	Monster Factory	Monster Factory	3:54
3.	"Baam" (Japanese version instrumental)		Shinsadong Tiger; Beom x Nang	Shinsadong Tiger	3:28
4.	"Only One You" (Japanese version instrumental)		Monster Factory	Monster Factory	3:54
Total length:					14:44

== Charts ==
Chart performance for "Baam"
Chart (2018)	Peak position
Japan (Billboard Japan Hot 100)	12
Japan (Oricon Singles Chart)	8
South Korea (Gaon Digital Chart)	13
South Korea (Kpop Hot 100)	9
US World Digital Song Sales (Billboard)	5

== Credits and personnel ==
Credits adapted from Melon.

- Momoland – vocals
- Beom x Nang – composer, lyricist
- Shinsadong Tiger – composer, lyricist, arrangement

== Release history ==
Release dates and formats for "Baam"
Version	Region	Date	Format	Label
Korean	Worldwide	June 26, 2018	Digital download; streaming	MLD Entertainment; Kakao M
Japanese	Worldwide	November 7, 2018	CD single; digital download; streaming	King
