= Wonderful Love =

2017 single by Momoland

Single by Momoland

from the album Wonderful Love
- Language: Korean
- Released: April 26, 2017
- Recorded: 2017
- Genre: Dance-pop; teen pop
- Length: 3:16
- Label: Duble Kick Entertainment; Kakao M
- Composers: Duble Sidekick; Long Candy; The Cannels
- Lyricists: Duble Sidekick; Tenzo & Tasco; Long Candy
- Producers: Tenzo & Tasco

Momoland singles chronology
"Jjan! Koong! Kwang!" (2016)	"Wonderful Love" (2017)	"Freeze" (2017)

EDM version cover

Music video
- "Wonderful Love" on YouTube

"Wonderful Love" (Korean: 어마어마해) is a song recorded by South Korean girl group Momoland. It was released on April 26, 2017, by Duble Kick Entertainment and distributed by Kakao M as the group's single from their first single album of the same name. The track was written by Duble Sidekick, Tenzo & Tasco and Long Candy, with Tenzo & Tasco credited as the producer.

The accompanying music video for the song was uploaded onto 1theK's YouTube channel simultaneously with the single's release. An EDM version was released on June 16, 2017. To promote the single, the group performed on several South Korean music show programs, such as M Countdown and Inkigayo.

== Composition ==
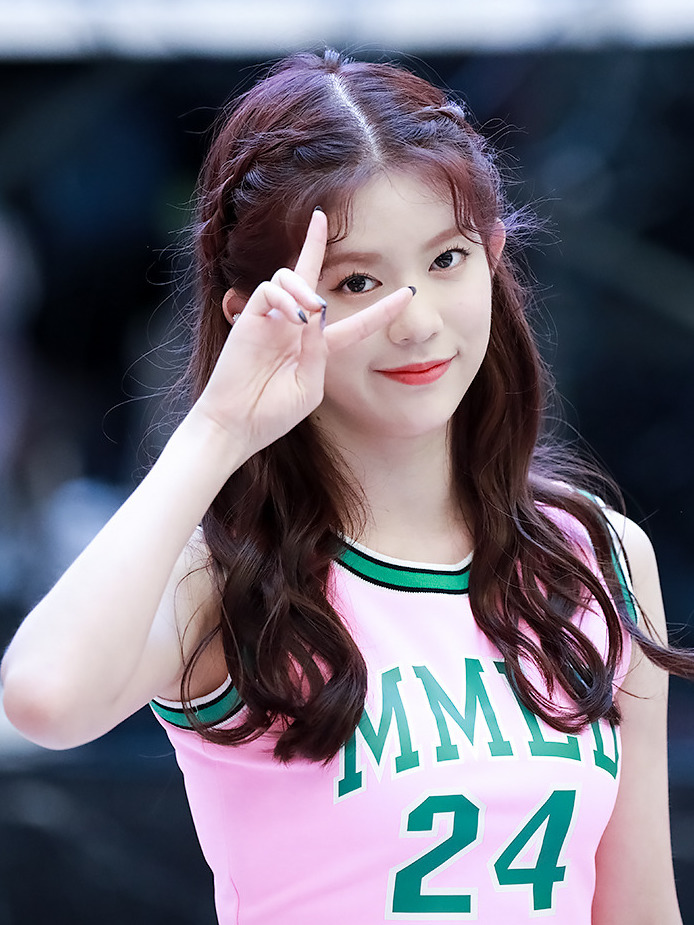
"Wonderful Love" serves as the first Momoland song with member Daisy (pictured in 2018).

"Wonderful Love" is a dance-pop song. It was composed by Duble Sidekick, Long Candy and The Cannels. Duble Sidekick, Tenzo & Tasco and Long Candy were credited as the lyricists while Tenzo & Tasco as the producer. The song served as the group's first song and single with members Daisy and Taeha. It was composed using 4/4 common time in the key of B, with a tempo of 132 beats per minute, and runs for three minutes and 17 seconds.

== Background and release ==
Momoland released their debut extended play Welcome to Momoland with its lead single "Jjan! Koong! Kwang!" in November 2016. Following the release of their debut, Daisy and Taeha joined the group as members in March 2017.

Prior to the release of "Wonderful Love", teasers featuring photos of Momoland from the single album's photoshoot, a snippet of the song and clips from its music video were released online in April 2017. The song was officially released on April 26, 2017, by Duble Kick Entertainment and distributed by Kakao M as the group's sophomore single and first single album. The single album included an instrumental of the song. The dance practice video was uploaded on May 1, 2017. The single did not chart in the Gaon Music Chart.

On June 16, 2017, an EDM version of the song was released. Myo was credited for the arrangement of the EDM version. It was included in the release of the group's sophomore extended play, Freeze! in 2017. The instrumental of the EDM version was included in the group's 2018 third extended play, Great! as the sixth track.

Both the original Korean version and the EDM version of "Wonderful Love" were included in the group's 2018 compilation album, Momoland The Best ~Korean Ver.~.

The Japanese version of the EDM version was included in the 2019 release of the group's debut studio album, Chiri Chiri.

== Critical reception ==
The Kraze Magazine called the song "a burst of energy and full of happiness." While the EDM version was described as "the perfect way to welcome the summer months", and that it has a "powerful fun club vibe." WhatTheKpop described the track as "upbeat and sweet", and it "expresses the innocent confession of a young lady." Seoul Beats criticized the song stating its a "decent song, but there is nothing that pops."

== Music video ==
A scene in the music video where Momoland's Jane and Daisy appear in an amusement park.

The music video for "Wonderful Love" was uploaded to 1theK's official YouTube channel on April 26, 2017, in conjunction with the release of the single. The video features the group playing around at an amusement park. Seoul Beats stated the video is "cute without being cutesy" and that it "leans towards obvious spring visual influences."

The music video was included in the DVD of Momoland The Best ~Korean Ver.~ (2018).

== Live performances ==
Momoland promoted "Wonderful Love" and its EDM version by performing on several music programs in South Korea including Inkigayo, M Countdown, Music Bank, The Show, Show Champion, Show! Music Core and Simply K-Pop. In October 2017, the song was performed in Global K-Pop Super Concert in Daejeon.

== Track listing ==
Digital download / streaming
No.	Title	Lyrics	Music	Arrangement	Length
1.	"Wonderful Love" (어마어마해)	Duble Sidekick; Tenzo & Tasco; Long Candy	Duble Sidekick; Long Candy; The Cannels	Tenzo & Tasco	3:16

Wonderful Love - single album
No.	Title	Lyrics	Music	Arrangement	Length
1.	"Wonderful Love" (어마어마해)	Duble Sidekick; Tenzo & Tasco; Long Candy	Duble Sidekick; Long Candy; The Cannels	Tenzo & Tasco	3:16
2.	"Wonderful Love" (어마어마해, instrumental)		Duble Sidekick; Long Candy; The Canels	Tenzo & Tasco	3:16
Total length:					6:32

"Wonderful Love" - EDM version
No.	Title	Lyrics	Music	Arrangement	Length
1.	"Wonderful Love" (어마어마해, EDM version)	Duble Sidekick; Tenzo & Tasco; Long Candy	Duble Sidekick; Long Candy; The Cannels	Myo	3:19
Total length:					3:19

== Credits and personnel ==
Credits adapted from Melon.

- Momoland – vocals
- The Cannels – composer
- Duble Sidekick – composer, lyricist
- Long Candy – composer, lyricist
- Tenzo & Tasco – lyricist, arrangement

== Release history ==
Release dates and formats for "Wonderful Love"
Version	Region	Date	Format	Label
Original	South Korea	April 26, 2017	CD; digital download; streaming	Duble Kick Entertainment; Kakao M
Original	Various	April 26, 2017	Digital download; streaming	Duble Kick Entertainment; Kakao M
EDM	Worldwide	June 16, 2017	Digital download; streaming	Duble Kick Entertainment; Kakao M
