= Chiri Chiri =

Studio album by Momoland

Studio album by Momoland
- Released: September 4, 2019
- Recorded: 2018–2019
- Genre: J-pop
- Language: Japanese
- Label: King

Momoland chronology
Momoland The Best ~Korean Ver.~ (2018)	Chiri Chiri (2019)

Singles from Chiri Chiri
- 1. "Bboom Bboom" Released: June 13, 2018; 2. "Baam" Released: November 7, 2018; 3. "I'm So Hot" Released: May 8, 2019; 4. "Pinky Love" Released: September 4, 2019

Chiri Chiri is the debut Japanese studio album by South Korean girl group Momoland. It was released by King Records on September 4, 2019. The album features the group's Japanese singles – "Bboom Bboom", "Baam", "I'm So Hot" and "Pinky Love"; along with the Japanese versions of Momoland's previously released songs and the new track "Chiri Chiri".

Commercially, the album peaked at number thirty on Japan's Oricon Albums Chart.

== Singles ==
The Japanese version of "Bboom Bboom" was released on June 13, 2018 by King Records. It was followed by "Baam" which was released on November 7, 2018. The third single "I'm So Hot" was released on May 7, 2019.

The first three Japanese singles of the group peaked on Oricon Singles Chart at number four, eight and eight respectively. The singles also peaked on the Billboard Japan Hot 100 at number nine, twelve and fifty-one respectively.

To coincide the release of their debut Japanese studio album, "Pinky Love" was released as a single in September 2019. The music video for the song was released on September 2, 2019. While the dance practice video was uploaded on June 29, 2020.

== Commercial performance ==
In Japan, the studio album debuted and peaked at number thirty on the Oricon Albums Chart. It sold 1,669 physical copies. Chiri Chiri also charted on the Billboard Hot Albums at number forty-nine.

== Track listing ==
Standard edition
No.	Title	Lyrics	Music	Arrangement	Length
1.	"Chiri Chiri"	Bull$EyE; real-fantasy; Ondine	Bull$EyE; real-fantasy; Ondine	Bull$EyE; real-fantasy; Ondine	3:02
2.	"Pinky Love"	Bull$EyE; real-fantasy; Yoske; Alive Knob; Manbo	Bull$EyE; real-fantasy; Yoske; Manbo	Bull$EyE; real-fantasy; Yoske	3:10
3.	"Bboom Bboom"	Shinsadong Tiger; Beom x Nang	Shinsadong Tiger; Beom x Nang	Shinsadong Tiger	3:30
4.	"Baam"	Shinsadong Tiger; Beom x Nang	Shinsadong Tiger; Beom x Nang	Shinsadong Tiger	3:30
5.	"I'm So Hot"	Shinsadong Tiger; Beom x Nang	Shinsadong Tiger; Beom x Nang	Shinsadong Tiger	3:22
6.	"Only One You"	Monster Factory	Stainboys	Stainboys	3:56
7.	"Wonderful Love" (EDM version)	Duble Sidekick; Tenzo & Tasco; Long Candy	Duble Sidekick; Long Candy; The Cannels	Tenzo & Tasco	3:26
8.	"Curious"	Monster Factory; ATM	Monster Factory	Monster Factory	3:17
9.	"Freeze"	Duble Sidekick; Jinli	Duble Sidekick; WiiKeed; Jinli; Glory Face	WiiKeed; Glory Face	3:15
10.	"Welcome to Momoland"	Duble Sidekick; Yonghee	Jake K; Andreas Oberg; Skylar Mones	Jake K	3:27

DVD limited edition
No.	Title	Length
1.	"Bboom Bboom" (music video)	3:34
2.	"Baam" (music video)	3:33
3.	"I'm So Hot" (music video)	3:32
4.	"Bboom Bboom" (making of music video)
5.	"Baam" (making of music video)
6.	"I'm So Hot" (making of music video)

== Charts ==
Chart performance for Chiri Chiri
Chart (2019)	Peak position
Japan (Billboard Japan Hot Albums)	49
Japan (Oricon Albums Chart)	30

== Release history ==
Release dates and formats for Chiri Chiri
Region	Date	Format	Label
Japan	September 4, 2019	CD; digital download; streaming	King
Various	September 4, 2019	Digital download; streaming	King
