= Freeze (Momoland song) =

2017 single by Momoland

Single by Momoland

from the EP Freeze!
- Language: Korean
- Released: August 22, 2017
- Recorded: 2017
- Genre: Dance pop; Teen pop
- Length: 3:12
- Label: Duble Kick Entertainment; Kakao M
- Composers: Duble Sidekick; WiiKeed; Jinli; Glory Face
- Lyricists: Duble Sidekick; Jinli
- Producers: WiiKeed; Glory Face

Momoland singles chronology
"Wonderful Love" (2017)	"Freeze" (2017)	"Bboom Bboom" (2018)

Music video
- "Freeze" on YouTube

"Freeze" (Korean: 꼼짝마) is a song recorded by South Korean girl group Momoland. It was released on August 22, 2017 by Duble Kick Entertainment and distributed by Kakao M as the group's lead single from their second extended play of the same title. The track was written by Duble Sidekick and Jinli, with WiiKEED and Glory Face credited as producers. The song interpolates "Entrance of the Gladiators" by Julius Fučík.

The accompanying music video for the song was uploaded onto 1theK's YouTube channel simultaneously with the single's release. To promote the single, the group performed on several South Korean music show programs, such as M Countdown and Inkigayo.

== Composition ==
"Freeze" is a dance-pop song that interpolates "Entrance of the Gladiators" by Julius Fučík. It was composed by Duble Sidekick, Jinli and Glory Face of Full8loom. Duble Sidekick and Jinli of Full8loom were credited as the lyricists, while WiiKEED and Glory Face of Full8loom as producers.

== Background and release ==
Momoland released their single album Wonderful Love featuring the lead single of the same name in April 2017. The single featured new members Daisy and Taeha. Following the release of "Wonderful Love", it was announced on August 8, 2017 the release of the second extended play of the group along with its lead single, "Freeze". Prior to the release, teasers featuring photos of Momoland from the extended play's photoshoot, a snippet of the song and clips from its music video were released online in August 2017.

The song was officially released on August 22, 2017 by Duble Kick Entertainment and distributed by Kakao M as the group's third single. It served as the lead single of their second extended play of the same title. An instrumental of the song was included in the extended play as the sixth track. The dance practice video was uploaded on August 28, 2017.

It was also included in the group's 2018 compilation album, Momoland The Best ~Korean Ver.~. The Japanese version of the song was included in the 2019 release of the group's debut studio album, Chiri Chiri.

== Critical reception ==
Jacques Peterson of Idolator ranked "Freeze" as one of the "best" K-pop songs of 2017. Peterson described the song as "stupidly good, with a creepy carnival sample and pounding electro-pop that builds to a huge chorus." Kim Joo-hyun of Beff Report called it a "pop dance song with a trendy composition using trap sound with a melody that fits Momoland's unique amusement park concept." The Kraze Magazine labeled the song as a "carnival masterpiece."

== Music videos ==
A scene in the music video where Kim Jae-hwan appears with Momoland's Daisy.

The music video for "Freeze" was uploaded to 1theK's official YouTube channel on August 22, 2017, in conjunction with the release of the single. Singer Kim Jae-hwan of the South Korean boy group Wanna One appeared in the music video. A "dance" version of the music video was published on September 11, 2017. Annie Martin of United Press International described the video as a "colorful" video showing Momoland "swoon over" Jae-hwan.

The music video and the dance version were included in the DVD of Momoland The Best ~Korean Ver.~ (2018).

== Live performances ==
Momoland promoted "Freeze" by performing on several music programs in South Korea including Inkigayo, M Countdown, Music Bank, The Show, Show Champion and Simply K-Pop. In October 2017, the song was performed in Global K-Pop Super Concert in Daejeon.

In August 2018, the song was performed by the group in K-Pop Live concert in the Philippines.

== Track listing ==
Digital download / streaming
No.	Title	Lyrics	Music	Arrangement	Length
1.	"Freeze" (꼼짝마)	Duble Sidekick; Jinli	Duble Sidekick; WiiKeed; Jinli; Glory Face	WiiKeed; Glory Face	3:12

== Credits and personnel ==
Credits adapted from Melon.

- Momoland – vocals
- Duble Sidekick – composer, lyricist
- Glory Face – composer, arrangement
- Jinli – composer, lyricist
- WiiKeed – composer, arrangement

== Release history ==
Release dates and formats for "Freeze"
Region	Date	Format	Label
Worldwide	August 22, 2017	Digital download; streaming	Duble Kick Entertainment; Kakao M
