= Starry Night (Momoland EP) =

Extended play by Momoland

EP by Momoland
- Released: June 11, 2020
- Recorded: 2020
- Studio: 821 Studio, Dublekick Studio (Seoul)
- Genre: K-pop
- Length: 15:41
- Language: Korean; English
- Label: MLD Entertainment; Kakao M
- Producer: Bull$EyE; real-fantasy; Ondine; Yoske

Momoland chronology
Thumbs Up (2019)	Starry Night (2020)	Ready or Not (2020)

Singles from Starry Night
- 1. "Starry Night" Released: June 11, 2020

Starry Night is the sixth and final extended play by South Korean girl group Momoland. It was released by MLD Entertainment and distributed by Kakao M on June 11, 2020. For the extended play, Momoland worked with a variety of producers including Bull$EyE, real-fantasy, Ondine and Yoske. Starry Night consists of six tracks including the single of the same name and its English version and instrumental, and the Korean version of the previously released songs "Chiri Chiri" and "Pinky Love".

Commercially, the album peaked at number twenty-one on South Korea's Gaon Album Chart.

== Background and release ==
Momoland as a six-member group, released the song "Thumbs Up" from their second single album of the same name in December 2019. Following "Thumbs Up", MLD Entertainment announced on May 15, 2020, that Momoland would be making their comeback in June 2020.

Prior to the release of Starry Night, teasers featuring photos of Momoland from the extended play's photoshoot, and snippet of the songs were released online in June 2020. The extended play was officially released on June 11, 2020, by MLD Entertainment and distributed by Kakao M, with the lead single of the same title.

== Commercial performance ==
In South Korea, the extended play debuted and peaked at number twenty-one on the Gaon Album Chart for the week ending June 13, 2020. It was the seventy-fifth most selling album on the Gaon Album Chart for the month of June 2020 with 4,817 copies sold.

== Track listing ==
Standard edition
No.	Title	Lyrics	Music	Arrangement	Length
1.	"Starry Night"	Bull$EyE; real-fantasy; Ondine; Kim Do Da Ri; Momoland	Bull$EyE; real-fantasy; Ondine; Kim Do Da Ri	Bull$EyE; real-fantasy; Ondine	3:11
2.	"Pinky Love"	Bull$EyE; real-fantasy; Yoske; Alive Knob; Manbo	Bull$EyE; real-fantasy; Yoske; Manbo	Bull$EyE; real-fantasy; Yoske	3:08
3.	"Chiri Chiri" (찌릿찌릿)	Bull$EyE; real-fantasy; Ondine	Bull$EyE; real-fantasy; Ondine	Bull$EyE; real-fantasy; Ondine	3:00
4.	"Starry Night" (English version)	Bull$EyE; real-fantasy; Ondine; Kim Do Da Ri; Keepintouch	Bull$EyE; real-fantasy; Ondine; Kim Do Da Ri	Bull$EyE; real-fantasy; Ondine	3:11
5.	"Starry Night" (instrumental)		Bull$EyE; real-fantasy; Ondine; Kim Do Da Ri	Bull$EyE; real-fantasy; Ondine
Total length:					15:41

== Charts ==
Chart performance for Starry Night
Chart (2020)	Peak position
South Korea (Gaon Album Chart)	21

== Credits and personnel ==
Credits adapted from Melon.

- Momoland – vocals (1, 2, 3, 4), lyricist (1)
- Alive Knob – lyricist (2)
- Bull$EyE – lyrics (1, 2, 3, 4), composer, arrangement
- Kim Chae-won – chorus, guitar, recorder
- Kim Do Da Ri – lyricist (1, 4), composer (1, 4, 5)
- keepintouch - lyricist (4)
- Manbo – lyricist (2), composer (2)
- Ondine – lyricist (1, 3, 4), composer (1, 3, 4, 5), arrangement (1, 3, 4, 5)
- real-fantasy – drums, programming, lyricist (1, 2, 3, 4), composer, arrangement, keyboard
- Team AMG – mixing
- Hwang Min-hee – recorder (2, 3)
- Kwon Nam Woo – mastering
- Yoske – lyricist (2), composer (2), arrangement (2)

== Release history ==
Release dates and formats for Starry Night
Region	Date	Format	Label
South Korea	June 11, 2020	CD; digital download; streaming	MLD Entertainment; Kakao M
Various	June 11, 2020	Digital download; streaming	MLD Entertainment; Kakao M
