= Show Me (EP) =

Extended play by Momoland

EP by Momoland
- Released: March 20, 2019
- Recorded: 2019
- Genre: K-pop
- Length: 19:40
- Language: Korean
- Label: MLD Entertainment; Kakao M
- Producer: Shinsadong Tiger; Byun Moo Hyuk; AlLike; Pinkmoon; Beverly Kidz; Big Bread; Judy

Momoland chronology
Fun to the World (2018)	Show Me (2019)	Thumbs Up (2019)

Singles from Show Me
- 1. "I'm So Hot" Released: March 20, 2019

Show Me is the fifth extended play by South Korean girl group Momoland. The EP was released by MLD Entertainment and distributed Kakao M on March 20, 2019. For the extended play, Momoland worked with a variety of producers including Shinsadong Tiger, Byun Moo Hyuk, Pinkmoon, Beverly Kids, Big Bread and Judy. Show Me consists of six tracks including the single "I'm So Hot" and its instrumental, and four other new tracks.

To promote the extended play, the group performed on several South Korean music show programs, such as M Countdown and Inkigayo. Commercially, the album peaked at number seven on South Korea's Gaon Album Chart. Members Daisy and Taeha didn't take part in the extended play due to health and personal reasons. The EP also marked as Yeonwoo's final comeback with the group.

== Background and release ==
On February 12, 2019, it was announced that the group will release a new album in March, almost nine month after their latest album. On March 6, it was announced that the group will release a new mini album on March 20. On March 13, MLD Entertainment announced that the group will return with seven members, while members Daisy and Taeha will not take part due to health and personal reasons, and will rejoin the group in the future

The extended play was released on March 20, 2019, by MLD Entertainment and Kakao M as a digital download through several music portals, including MelOn and Apple Music.

== Commercial performance ==
In South Korea, the extended play debuted at number seven on the Gaon Album Chart for the week ending March 23, 2019. In its second week, it fell to number twenty-seven and to number sixty-five in its third week. It was the thirty-first most selling album on the Gaon Album Chart for the month of March 2019, with 9,153 copies sold.

== Track listing ==
Standard edition
No.	Title	Lyrics	Music	Arrangement	Length
1.	"I'm So Hot"	Shinsadong Tiger; Beom x Nang	Shinsadong Tiger; Beom x Nang	Shinsadong Tiger	3:20
2.	"Falling U"	Byun Moo Hyuk	Byun Moo Hyuk	Byun Moo Hyuk; AlLike	2:53
3.	"Light Up" (빛나)	Pinkmoon	Pinkmoon	Pinkmoon	3:12
4.	"Holiday"	Beverly Kidz; Yoon Seok	Beverly Kidz; Yoon Seok	Beverly Kidz	3:30
5.	"What You Want"	Big Bread; Judy	Big Bread; Judy	Big Bread; Judy	3:25
6.	"I'm So Hot" (instrumental)		Shinsadong Tiger; Beom x Nang	Shinsadong Tiger	3:20
Total length:					19:40

== Charts ==
Chart performance for Show Me
Chart (2019)	Peak position
South Korea (Gaon Album Chart)	7

== Credits and personnel ==
Credits adapted from Melon.

- Momoland – vocals (1, 2, 3, 4, 5)
- AlLike – arrangement (2)
- Beom x Nang – lyricist (1), composer (1, 6)
- Beverly Kidz – lyricist (4), composer (4), arrangement (4)
- Big Bread – lyricist (5), composer (5), arrangement (5)
- Byun Moo Hyuk – lyricist (2), composer (2), arrangement (2)
- Judy – lyricist (5), composer (5), arrangement (5)
- Pinkmoon – lyricist (3), composer (3), arrangement (3)
- Yoon Seok – lyricist (4), composer (4)
- Shinsadong Tiger – lyricist (1), composer (1, 6), arrangement (1, 6)

== Release history ==
Release dates and formats for Show Me
Region	Date	Format	Label
South Korea	March 20, 2019	CD; digital download; streaming	MLD Entertainment; Kakao M
Various	March 20, 2019	Digital download; streaming	MLD Entertainment; Kakao M
