= Fun to the World =

Extended play by Momoland

EP by Momoland
- Released: June 26, 2018
- Recorded: 2018
- Genre: K-pop
- Length: 17:34
- Language: Korean
- Labels: MLD Entertainment; Kakao M
- Producers: Shinsadong Tiger; Pinkmoon; Stainboys; Monster Factory

Momoland chronology
Great! (2018)	Fun to the World (2018)	Show Me (2019)

Singles from Fun to the World
- 1. "Baam" Released: June 26, 2018

Fun to the World is the fourth extended play by South Korean girl group Momoland. It was released by MLD Entertainment and distributed by Kakao M on June 26, 2018. For the extended play, Momoland worked with a variety of producers including Shinsadong Tiger, Pinkmoon, Stainboys and Monster Factory. Fun to the World consists of five tracks including the single "Baam" and its instrumental and four other new tracks.

To promote the extended play, the group performed on several South Korean music show programs, such as M Countdown and Inkigayo. Commercially, the album peaked at number six on South Korea's Gaon Album Chart.

== Release ==
The extended play was released on June 26, 2018, through several music portals, including Melon and iTunes.

== Commercial performance ==
In South Korea, the extended play debuted and peaked at number six on the Gaon Album Chart for the week of June 30, 2018. It was the twentieth best-selling album for June 2018, with 9,347 physical copies sold. It has sold over 14,498 copies as of August 2018.

== Track listing ==
Standard edition
No.	Title	Lyrics	Music	Arrangement	Length
1.	"Baam"	Shinsadong Tiger; Beom x Nang	Shinsadong Tiger; Beom x Nang	Shinsadong Tiger	3:28
2.	"Very Very" (베리베리)	Pinkmoon	Pinkmoon	Pinkmoon	3:22
3.	"Bingo Game" (빙고게임)	Monster Factory	Stainboys	Stainboys	3:22
4.	"Only One You"	Monster Factory	Monster Factory	Monster Factory	3:54
5.	"Baam" (instrumental)		Shinsadong Tiger; Beom x Nang	Shinsadong Tiger	3:28
Total length:					17:34

== Charts ==
Chart performance for Fun to the World
Chart (2018)	Peak position
South Korea (Gaon Album Chart)	6

== Credits and personnel ==
Credits adapted from Melon.

- Momoland – vocals (1, 2, 3, 4)
- Beom x Nang – lyricist (1), composer (1, 5)
- Monster Factory – lyricist (3, 4), composer (4), arrangement (4)
- Pinkmoon – lyricist (2), composer (2), arrangement (2)
- Shinsadong Tiger – lyricist (1), composer (1, 5), arrangement (1, 5)
- Stainboys – composer (3), arrangement (3)

== Release history ==
Release dates and formats for Fun to the World
Region	Date	Format	Label
South Korea	June 26, 2018	CD; digital download; streaming	MLD Entertainment; Kakao M
Various	June 26, 2018	Digital download; streaming	MLD Entertainment; Kakao M
