= Great! =

2018 extended play by Momoland

EP by Momoland
- Released: January 3, 2018
- Recorded: December 2017
- Genre: K-pop
- Length: 19:59
- Language: Korean
- Labels: Duble Kick Entertainment; Kakao M
- Producers: Shinsadong Tiger; Monster Factory; Pinkmoon; Beverly Kidz

Momoland chronology
Freeze! (2017)	Great! (2018)	Fun to the World (2018)

Singles from Great!
- 1. "Bboom Bboom" Released: January 3, 2018

Great! is the third extended play by South Korean girl group Momoland. It was released by Duble Kick Entertainment and distributed by Kakao M on January 3, 2018. For the extended play, Momoland worked with a variety of producers including Shinsadong Tiger, Monster Factory, Pinkmoon and Beverly Kidz. Great! consists of six tracks including the single "Bboom Bboom" and its instrumental, three other new tracks and the instrumental version of the previously released single "Wonderful Love" (EDM ver.).

To promote the extended play, the group performed on several South Korean music show programs, such as M Countdown and Inkigayo. Commercially, the album peaked at number three on South Korea's Gaon Album Chart.

== Commercial performance ==
In South Korea, the extended play debuted at number twenty-nine on the Gaon Album Chart for the week ending January 6, 2018. The following week, it dropped to number forty-nine. In its third week, it peaked at number twenty. It was the forty-first most selling album on the Gaon Album Chart for the month of January 2018 with 5,366 copies sold. In February 2018, the extended play peaked of number three, making it the highest-charting album of Momoland on the Gaon Album Chart. It was the fourteenth most selling album on the Gaon Album Chart for the month of February 2018 with 11,920 copies sold. As of April 2018, it has sold over 22,596 copies.

== Track listing ==
Standard edition
No.	Title	Lyrics	Music	Arrangement	Length
1.	"Bboom Bboom" (뿜뿜)	Shinsadong Tiger; Beom x Nang	Shinsadong Tiger; Beom x Nang	Shinsadong Tiger	3:28
2.	"Curious (궁금해)"	Monster Factory; ATM	Monster Factory	Monster Factory	3:16
3.	"Same Same"	Pinkmoon	Pinkmoon	Pinkmoon	3:18
4.	"Fly"	Beverly Kidz; Yoon Seok	Beverly Kidz; Yoon Seok	Beverly Kidz	3:05
5.	"Bboom Bboom" (instrumental)		Shinsadong Tiger; Beom x Nang	Shinsadong Tiger	3:28
6.	"Wonderful Love" (EDM version, instrumental)		Tenzo & Tasco; Long Candy; The Cannels	Myo	3:23
Total length:					19:59

== Charts ==
Chart performance for Great!
Chart (2018)	Peak position
South Korea (Gaon Album Chart)	3

== Credits and personnel ==
Credits adapted from Melon.

- Momoland – vocals (1, 2, 3, 4)
- ATM – lyricist (2)
- Beom x Nang – lyricist (1), composer (1, 5)
- Beverly Kidz – lyricist (4), composer (4), arrangement (4)
- The Cannels – composer (6)
- Long Candy – composer (6)
- Monster Factory – lyricist (2), composer (2), arrangement (2)
- Myo – arrangement (6)
- Pinkmoon – lyricist (3), composer (3), arrangement (3)
- Shinsadong Tiger – lyricist (1), composer (1, 5), arrangement (1, 5)
- Tenzo & Tasco – composer (6)
- Yoon Seok – lyricist (4), composer (4)

== Release history ==
Release dates and formats for Great!
Region	Date	Format	Label
South Korea	January 3, 2018	CD; digital download; streaming	Dublekick Entertainment; Kakao M
Various	January 3, 2018	Digital download; streaming	Dublekick Entertainment; Kakao M
