= Welcome to Momoland =

Extended play by Momoland

EP by Momoland
- Released: November 10, 2016
- Recorded: 2016
- Genre: K-pop
- Language: Korean
- Label: Duble Kick Entertainment; Kakao M
- Producer: Jake K; Tenzo & Tasco; Yokan; Full8loom

Momoland chronology
Welcome to Momoland (2016)	Wonderful Love (2017)

Singles from Welcome to Momoland
- 1. "Jjan! Koong! Kwang!" Released: November 10, 2016

Welcome to Momoland is the debut extended play by South Korean girl group Momoland. It was released by Duble Kick Entertainment and distributed by Kakao M on November 10, 2016. For the extended play, Momoland worked with a variety of producers including Duble Sidekick, Tenzo & Tasco, Jake K, Yokan and Full8loom. Welcome to Momoland consists of six tracks including the group's debut single "Jjan! Koong! Kwang!" and its instrumental and four other new tracks. The album was crowdfunded to cover the cost for producing the physical format.

To promote the extended play, the group performed on several South Korean music show programs, such as M Countdown and Inkigayo. Commercially, the album peaked at number twenty-eight on South Korea's Gaon Album Chart.

== Background and release ==
Momoland was formed in Mnet's survival reality show Finding Momoland which premiered in June 2016. Created by Duble Kick Entertainment, which a group of seven members were selected from ten trainees. According to Duble Sidekick in September 2016, the debut single of the group was delayed due to lack of spectators and the group failed to gather the amount they needed. The group's debut was later successfully crowdfunded, raising about 10 million won.

Momoland held their debut showcase on November 9, 2016. Welcome to Momoland was released on November 10, 2016, by Duble Kick Entertainment and distributed by Kakao M as the group's debut extended play.

== Promotion ==
Momoland made their debut performance of their single "Jjan! Koong! Kwang!" on November 10, 2016, through music television program M Countdown. The group also promoted "Jjan! Koong! Kwang!" on several music programs in South Korea including Inkigayo, Music Bank, Show Champion, Show! Music Core and Simply K-Pop. "Welcome to Momoland" and "Jjan! Koong! Kwang!" were also performed on The Show.

=== Singles ===
On October 20, 2016, the group's debut single was officially announced. Duble Sidekick was also reported to have worked on the single. Prior to the release, a teaser of "Jjan! Koong! Kwang!" and its music video were released online on November 3, 2016. The single was released on November 10, 2016, by Duble Kick Entertainment and distributed by Kakao M as the group's debut single. It served as the lead single for their first extended play, Welcome to Momoland. The accompanying music video for the song was uploaded onto 1theK's YouTube channel simultaneously with the single's release. Bae Yoon Jung of Yama & Hot Chicks served as the choreographer of the video. A dance version of the music video was released on November 14, 2016. The dance practice video was uploaded on November 16, 2016.

== Commercial performance ==
In South Korea, Welcome to Momoland debuted and peaked at number twenty-eight on the Gaon Album Chart for the week of November 12, 2016. It was the fifty-third best-selling album for the month November 2016 with 1,915 physical copies sold.

== Track listing ==
Standard edition
No.	Title	Lyrics	Music	Arrangement	Length
1.	"Welcome to Momoland"	Duble Sidekick; Yonghee	Jake K; Andreas Oberg; Skylar Mones	Jake K	3:26
2.	"Jjan! Koong! Kwang!" (짠쿵쾅)	Duble Sidekick; Tenzo & Tasco	Tenzo & Tasco; Seion	Tenzo & Tasco	3:19
3.	"Love Sick" (상사병)	Duble Sidekick; Yokan	Duble Sidekick; Yokan; Jake K	Yokan; Jake K	3:56
4.	"Oh-Gi-Yeo-Cha" (어기여차)	Duble Sidekick; Yokan; Taewoon	Duble Sidekick; Yokan; Taewoon	Full8loom	3:33
5.	"Jjan! Koong! Kwang!" (짠쿵쾅 Instrumental)		Tenzo & Tasco; Seion	Tenzo & Tasco	3:19
6.	"Oh-Gi-Yeo-Cha" (어기여차 Instrumental)		Duble Sidekick; Yokan; Taewoon	Full8loom	3:33

== Charts ==
Chart performance for Welcome to Momoland
Chart (2016)	Peak position
South Korea (Gaon Album Chart)	28

== Credits and personnel ==
Credits adapted from Melon.

- Momoland – vocals (1, 2, 3, 4)
- Duble Sidekick – lyricist (1, 2, 3), composer (3, 4, 6)
- Full8loom – arrangement (4, 6)
- Jake K – composer (1, 3), arrangement (1, 3)
- Skylar Mones – composer (1)
- Andreas Oberg – composer (1)
- Seion – composer (2, 5)
- Taewoon – composer (4, 6), lyricist (4)
- Tenzo & Tasco – lyricist (2), composer (2, 5), arrangement (2, 5)
- Yokan – composer (3, 4, 6), lyricist (3, 4), arrangement (3)
- Yonghee – lyricist (1)

== Release history ==
Release dates and formats for Welcome to Momoland
Region	Date	Format	Label
South Korea	November 10, 2016	CD; digital download; streaming	Dublekick Entertainment; Kakao M
Various	November 10, 2016	Digital download; streaming	Dublekick Entertainment; Kakao M
