= Momoland =

South Korean girl group

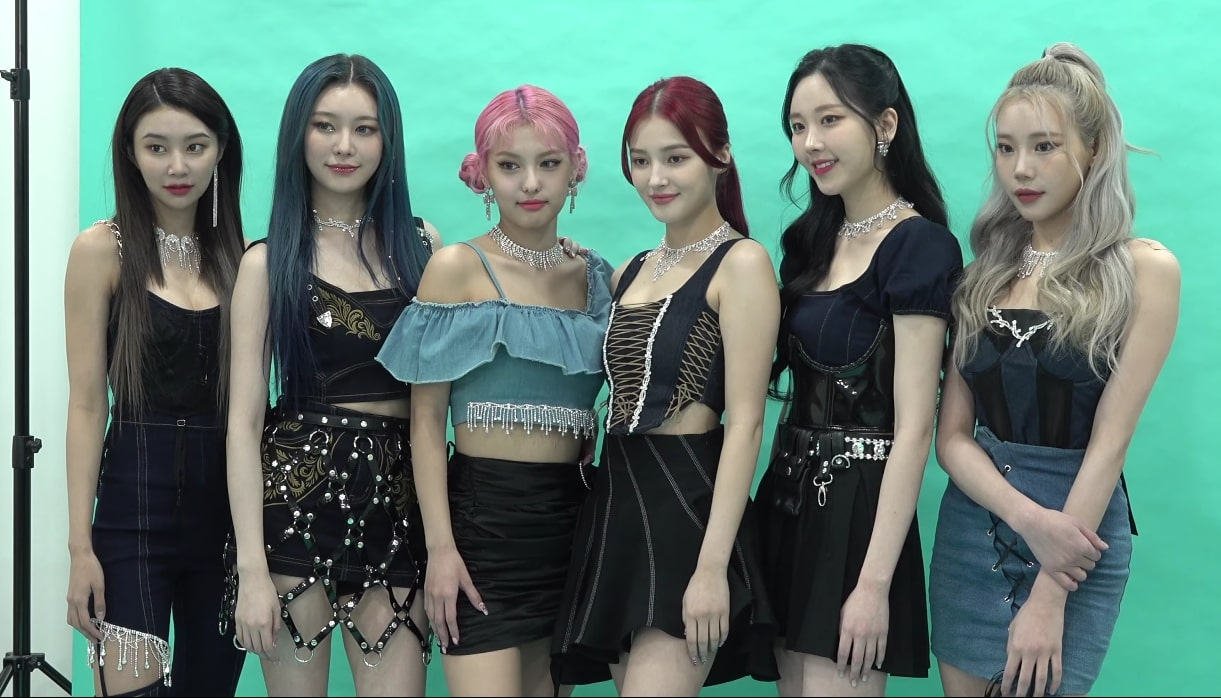
- Momoland in January 2022; L–R: Hyebin, Jane, Ahin, Nancy, Nayun, and JooE

Background information
- Also known as: MMLD
- Origin: Seoul, South Korea
- Genres: K-pop; dance-pop; electropop; J-pop
- Years active: 2016–2023; 2025–present
- Labels: MLD; King; ICM Partners; Inyeon Entertainment
- Members: Hyebin; Jane; Nayun; JooE; Ahin; Nancy
- Past members: Yeonwoo; Taeha; Daisy

Momoland (Korean: 모모랜드; RR: momolaendeu, stylized in all caps) is a South Korean girl group formed by MLD Entertainment (formerly known as Duble Kick Company) through the 2016 reality show Finding Momoland. The show's winners Hyebin, Yeonwoo, Jane, Nayun, JooE, Ahin, and Nancy served as the original members. Their debut mini album Welcome to Momoland was released on November 10, 2016. In 2017, Momoland became a nine-member group when Daisy and Taeha joined as members. In 2019, Taeha and Yeonwoo left the group, while Daisy departed in 2020. The group disbanded on February 14, 2023.

On April 10, 2025, the six members of the group signed exclusive contracts with Inyeon Entertainment and decided to continue team activities. On May 8, 2025, Inyeon Entertainment officially announced signed an exclusive contract with Momoland members Hye-bin, Jane, Nayun, Joo-E, Ahin, and Nancy and joined the team activities.

== History ==
=== 2016: Finding Momoland and Welcome to Momoland ===
In June 2016, Mnet's survival program Finding Momoland began, a reality show that was created by Duble Kick Entertainment where a group of seven members were selected from ten contestants, and they prepared their debut. The Final Mission could not collect 3,000 spectators, and the official debut was delayed. On October 26, 2016, the group was appointed as ambassadors for the International Relief Development NGO Plan Korea.

The group's debut showcase was held on November 9 of the same year. On November 10, their debut extended play Welcome to Momoland was released, and made their debut performance of their single "Jjan! Koong! Kwang!" through music television program M Countdown. The album was made possible by crowdfunding to cover the cost for producing the physical format. On December 27, the group except Yeonwoo, who stopped working due to lower back pain, attended SBS Gayo Daejeon. In October 2016, the group were appointed as the PR ambassador for the International Relief Development NGO Plan Korea, volunteered at the Phuc Luong Village in Thai Nguyen, Vietnam from December 12 to 16, 2017, to encourage Happy Mov students to participate in Kindergarten construction service.

=== 2017: Additional members, Wonderful Love and Freeze! ===
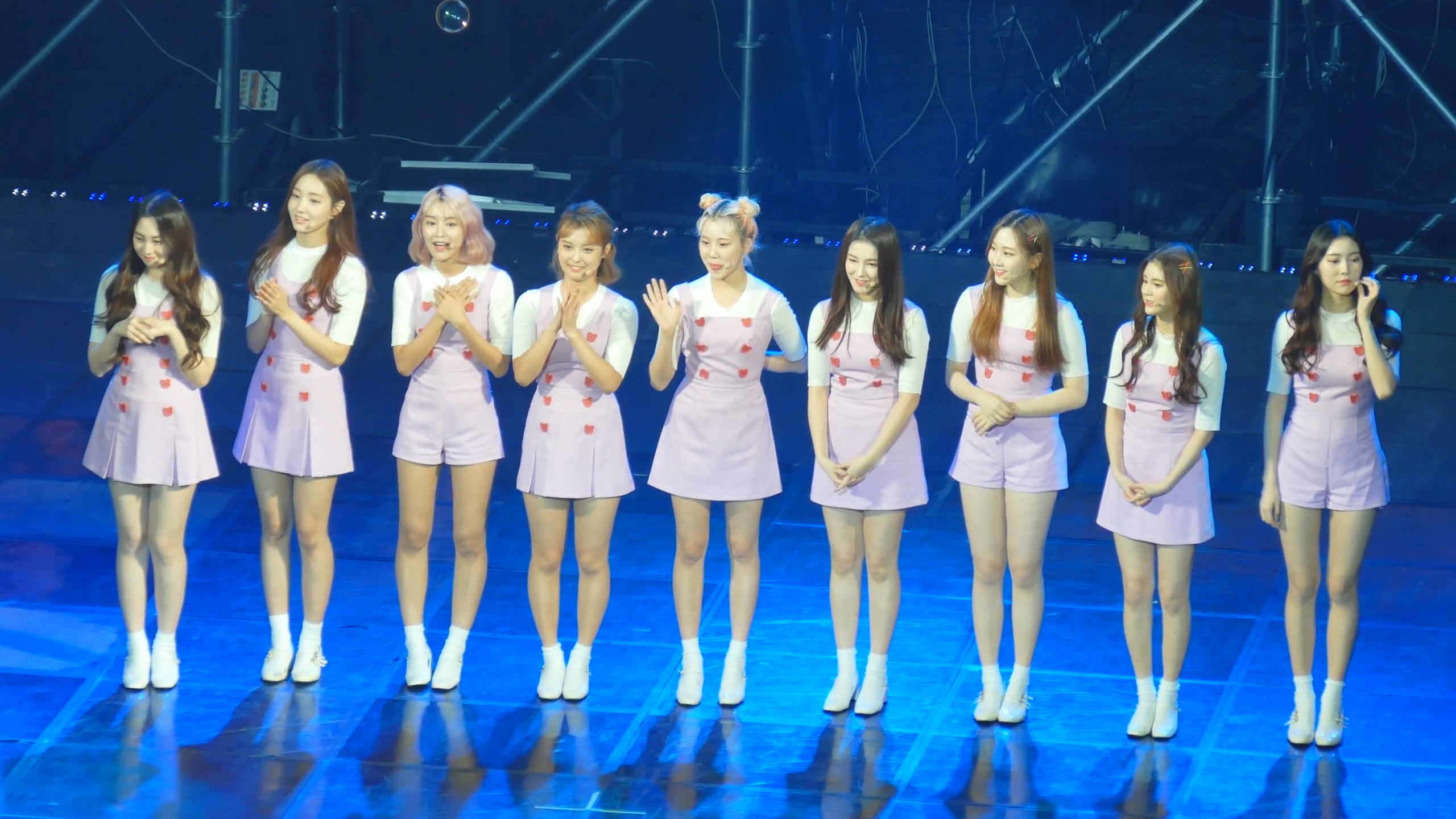
Momoland during the Hero Concert in Seoul on November 29, 2017.

On March 28, 2017, Daisy and Taeha joined the group. Daisy also appeared in the 2016 reality show Finding Momoland as a trainee. In April 2017, the group released their first single album Wonderful Love, with the lead single of the same name. On August 22, 2017, the group's second EP, Freeze! was released, with the single of the same title.

=== 2018: Great! and Fun to the World ===
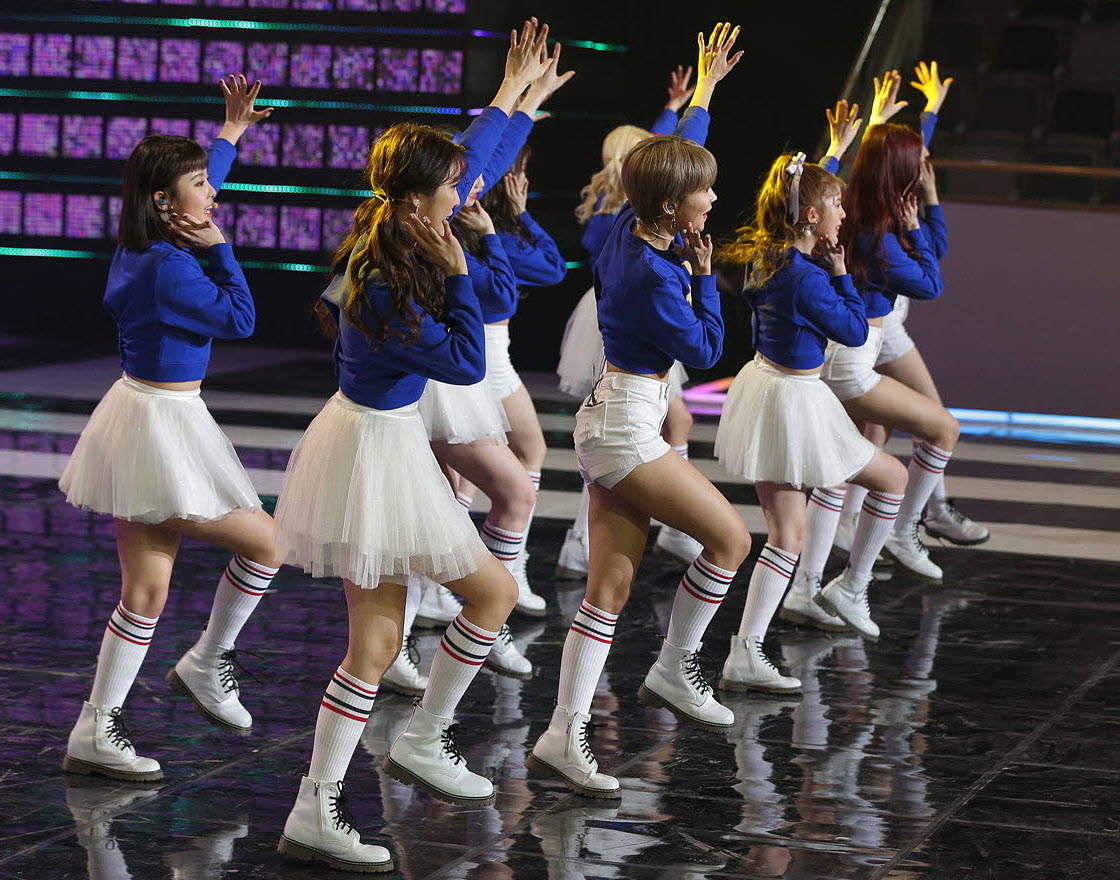
Momoland performing at the Pyeongchang Winter Olympics G-10 concert on January 30, 2018.

On January 3, 2018, the group released their third EP, Great! along with the single "Bboom Bboom". The same month, Russian girl group Serebro accused the group of plagiarizing their song "Mi Mi Mi" with "Bboom Bboom". The composer of "Bboom Bboom", Shinsadong Tiger, denied the allegations by pointing out that "the bass line [is] commonly heard in retro house or electro swing genres, as well as the 4-stanza chord." The group held promotional events in Tokyo and Osaka from February 28 to March 4, 2018. A showcase was also held at Tower Records in Shibuya.

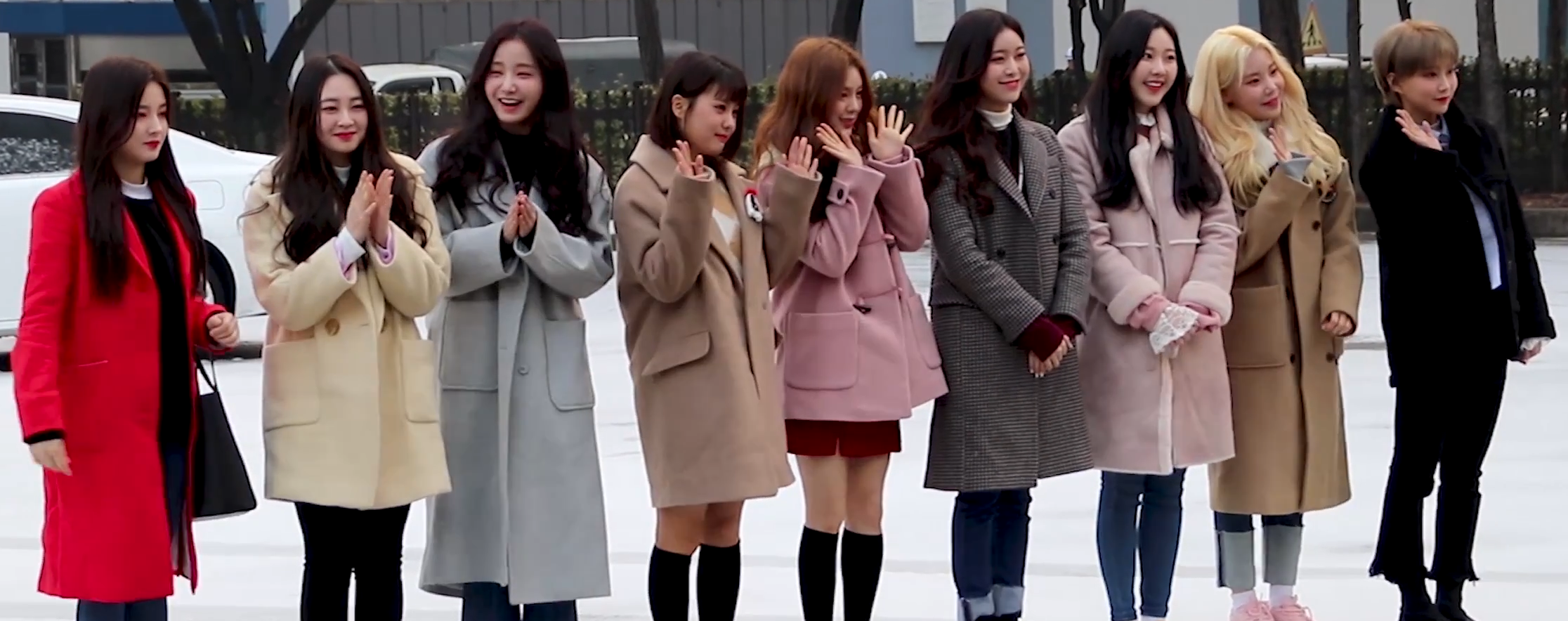
Momoland at KBS Music Bank in February 2018.

On June 26, 2018, the group's fourth EP Fun to the World was released, with the single "Baam". On August 9, 2018, the group became the first girl group and the second act to earn a Platinum certification on Gaon Music Chart, for the streams of "Bboom Bboom". In June 2018 the group released Japanese versions of their singles "Baam", "Boom Boom", and "I'm So Hot", and held concerts in Tokyo and Osaka several few months later. The group also signed with King Records and released their album in Japan.

In the summer of 2018 the group was the subject of a 5 part television miniseries called "Momoland in Saipan", a reality show which chronicled their music video production in the heart of the Northern Marians Islands in the south pacific; the project was supported by the Marianas Visitors Authority and aired in Korea on KBS World TV, and worldwide on Apple TV. In October the group was the subject of another reality television show, Lepiej późno niż wcale, a Polish reality-travel show, in which the members trained the show contestants in how to sing and dance like music stars.

Momoland has enhanced several new musical products and primarily distributes them through digital media in many languages. Unlike groups in North America and Europe, which typically release just one version MTV style music promotional video for their major releases, Momoland has released several, each one with a special theme or variation. The official video of their biggest hit, "BAAM", opens with a Momoland Jet flying around the world, featuring the band members in a traditional national dress around the world, varying quickly from scene to scene; Ahin is seen wearing a Japanese Kimono, court clothes of the Egyptian Ptolemaic Kingdom, formal wear from the Royal French Court of Louis XIV, traditional Chinese dress, and modern clothes. Another version of the video is a dance practice in which the group is wearing casual clothes, with Ahin in shorts and sneakers, rehearsing but with the choreography fully developed and a professional yet intimate feel. Another version of the BAAM music video features a nine-year-old dancer in the music video, Na Haeun (나하은), performing with high production values in a shopping mall, whom Ahin introduces in the opening. This type of video has no American or European counterpart. Another Momoland music product is the dance tutorial music video, in which band members teach their dance moves and choreography specific to their new song. These tutorial music videos are released in multiple languages with one of the girl members explaining the steps in advance, in which the polyglot members like Ahin introduce the choreography in Korean, English, Mandarin, and other languages. The impact of having multiple music videos for each song has been complemented by the planned use of colors in their costumes to complement the themes in their sound recordings, and in their performances generally.

=== 2019–2020: Show Me, Chiri Chiri, Thumbs Up and line-up changes ===
On March 20, 2019, Momoland released their fifth EP Show Me, with the lead single "I'm So Hot". The single marked their first release without Daisy and Taeha since Fun to the World. On September 4, 2019, the group released their first Japanese studio album, Chiri Chiri without members Daisy, Taeha and Yeonwoo. On October 4, 2019, the group and MLD Entertainment signed a co-management agreement with the Philippine media company ABS-CBN Corporation.

In November 2019, MLD Entertainment announced the departure of Yeonwoo and Taeha from the group, and stated that they were in discussions with Daisy about her future in the group. On December 30, 2019, the group's second single album Thumbs Up was released, with the lead single of the same name.

In January 2020, Daisy stated that the show Finding Momoland was fraudulent and had deceived viewers by manipulating the votes. She claimed that after her elimination, she was contacted by the agency with an offer to join the group. MLD Entertainment denied the claims, and stated they would be taking legal action against Daisy. On May 13, 2020, it was announced that Daisy had left the group.

Momoland experienced a delayed growth in international popularity, primarily through TikTok, Instagram Reels, and YouTube; the group members most responsible for this are Nancy Jewel McDonie and Ahin. As Instagram short form vertical videos began matching up against newer algorithms, more and more international fans become exposed to and identify with Nancy; it is not just that she is an English speaker, but she actually is American and bears an Irish surname like so many fans in Australia, North America, and Europe. As fans became more exposed to Nancy, combined with Ahin's ability to speak fluently to half the planet, Momoland started getting more and more international fans, from a much broader age range than a normal Kpop band would. The authenticity brought by Nancy and Ahin has increased the popularity of K-Pop generally with a much broader audience, and this synergy has increased the exposure of other group mates like JooE. This international exposure has built up slowly but has accelerated beginning in 2021 and 2022, years in which the pandemic years have stunted the group's creative output. While most KPop bands experience a flurry of creativity in their early years and fade when the members reach their late twenties, the broader, authentic international exposure that Nancy and Ahin have brought could be used to help the group continue to reinvent themselves in ways that other KPop bands cannot.

=== 2020–2023: Starry Night, international expansion, Ready or Not, "Yummy Yummy Love", and disbandment ===
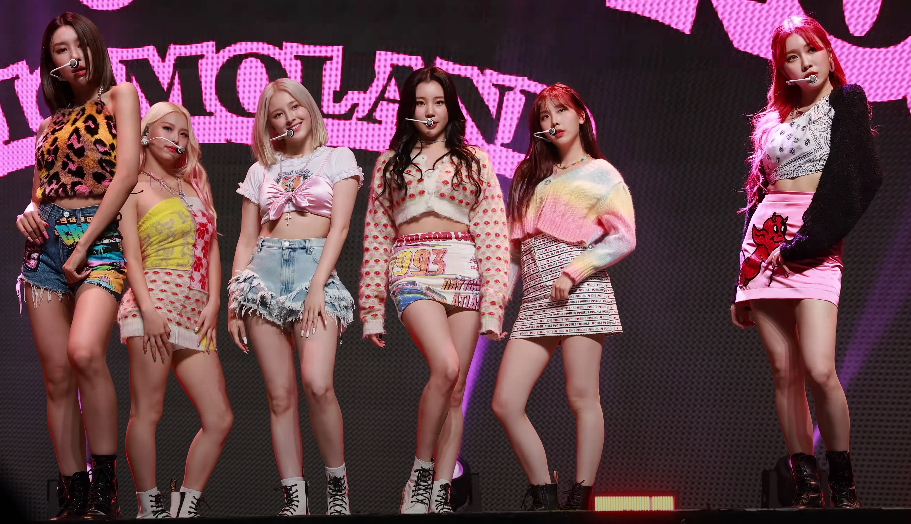
The group in year 2020

On June 11, 2020, Starry Night, a non-promoted "special" EP was released, with the lead single of the same name.

On June 29, 2020, the group signed a contract with ICM Partners, with plans to enter into the American market.

On November 17, 2020, they released their third single album Ready or Not, with the lead single of the same name. South Korean singer Psy participated as a lyricist of the song.

On February 5, 2021, the group released a cover of "Wrap Me in Plastic" by CHROMANCE.

On August 27, 2021, member Ahin was featured on EDM artist DJ Soda's single "Okay!", along with Lost Chameleon.

On January 14, 2022, the group released their English single "Yummy Yummy Love", in collaboration with Natti Natasha. The song went on to be nominated at the Latin American 2022 Juventud Awards, making Momoland the first Korean act to earn a nomination at the event. On December 16, they arrived in Hanoi for a performance at a culture and tourism festival in the city the following day.

On January 27, 2023, MLD Entertainment announced the group has departed from the label following expiration of the members' contracts. On February 14, 2023, Momoland officially announced their disbandment.

=== 2025–present: Reunion, signing with Inyeon Entertainment, and "Rodeo" ===
On April 10, 2025, MK Sports reported that Momoland members Hyebin, Jane, Nayun, JooE, Ahin, and Nancy recently signed exclusive contracts with Inyeon Entertainment. According to the report, this exclusive contract is for Momoland team activities, and they will reunite as a full group and stand on stage once again. On May 8, Inyeon Entertainment's official Instagram account welcomed Momoland to their agency and announced that they had signed exclusive contracts with all six members of Momoland. On June 30, Momoland released Festivaland, their first remix album with "Baam (EDM Remix)" serving as the album's title track. On August 13, Inyeon Entertainment told Dispatch, "Momoland is preparing a new album" and that it would be their first comeback in approximately three years and eight months. On September 1, Inyeon Entertainment announced Momoland's first digital single since their reunion, titled "Rodeo", which was released on September 8.

On January 16, 2026, it was announced that Momoland would release the digital single "White Spring" on January 23. On July 5, it was announced that Momoland would hold their 10th anniversary concert in Manila titled "Very Merry Party" and the concert would be held at EVM Convention Center, Quezon City, Metro Manila, Philippine on August 8. Momoland released "Still Valid" on November 10, 2026, to celebrate their tenth anniversary.

== Philanthropy ==
On October 26, 2016, Momoland was appointed as ambassadors for the International Relief Development NGO Plan Korea. They volunteered to fly to the Phuc Luong Village in Thai Nguyen, Vietnam, to encourage Happy Mov students to participate in Kindergarten construction service. In addition, the group had a cultural exchange event to villagers and Korean-Vietnamese culture and showed good response to the villagers by showing their songs on their debut album. On December 7, Momoland visited Seoul University Children Hospital to participate in the Pop Culture Artists Talent Donation Event, where about 100 young patients spent time with Momoland and others.

On May 20, 2017, Momoland participated in the "Plan Art Market to Help Children in the Global Village" as ambassadors of Plan Korea, that was held to support the children of Cambodia.

In February 2018, Momoland was designated as the new Korean Red Cross Blood Services ambassador. They participated in several events held by KRCBS and hosted a blood donation event while promoting Fun To The World. In May, Momoland participated in the "Seowon Valley Charity Green Concert". On June 22, 2018, Momoland became goodwill ambassador for Gangnam police. In December 2018, the group visited a sick fan in a hospital from the Philippines. In June, JooE and Yeonwoo participated in the Ice Bucket Challenge for a fund raising to build a hospital. Hyebin was also nominated, but instead of doing the challenge, she donated instead. In the same month, Momoland donated all of the proceeds of their Show Con for Fun To The World to help cover medical treatments for children who were injured through car accidents.

On May 24, 2019, Momoland participated in the "Let's Fly One & One Concert", a charity concert for victims of violence and abuse. In October, Momoland donated their earnings for their concert "Good Friends in Manila" to Filipino children in need from barangays San Jose and Calawis in Antipolo, Philippines.

In 2019 and 2020 Momoland members publicly supported Black Lives Matter. On April 21, the group donated 10,000 face mask cases (worth 100 million won) to Plan Korea to help prevent and overcome the COVID-19 pandemic. On May 8, they donated 1,180 kilograms of rice to the underprivileged through the Korean Red Cross. On June 26, they gave 1,500 sanitary pads (worth 5 million won) to multicultural families in need. The women's hygiene products were from the brand On A Precious Day, who previously announced Momoland as their exclusive endorsers. The next month, through Good Neighbors, they donated 1,500 sanitary pads from On A Precious Day to low-income families. In July, Momoland held at online concert called "Joy Angel Concert" as a social contribution project and donated the proceeds to the disadvantaged people struggling from COVID-19. In October, they participated in a charity photo shoot to introduce the reality of women's rights and the protection of women's rights worldwide. In November, Momoland participated in SBS' "Life Sharing Concert" which meant to encourage Koreans to participate in blood donation. In the same month, they also participated in the KBS1 Open Concert "Neighborhood Love Sharing Concert", a social contribution project for the underprivileged and socially disadvantaged.

In July 2022, Momoland participated in supporting the "Good Water Project" program of Gugah Nurani Indonesia, taking the role of "Heroes for Water" with the mission of supplying children with clean drinking water.

== Members ==
Adapted from their Naver profile.

- Ahin (아인)
- Hyebin (혜빈)
- Jane (제인)
- JooE (주이)
- Nancy (낸시)
- Nayun (나윤)

Former members

- Daisy (데이지)
- Taeha (태하)
- Yeonwoo (연우)

== Discography ==
- Chiri Chiri (2019)

== Filmography ==
- Finding Momoland (Mnet, 2016)
- The Liar and His Lover (2016)
- Momoland's Saipan Land (MBC Every 1, 2018)

== See also ==
- List of best-selling girl groups
