= Freeze! (EP) =

Extended play by Momoland

EP by Momoland
- Released: August 22, 2017
- Recorded: 2017
- Genre: K-pop
- Language: Korean
- Labels: Duble Kick Entertainment; Kakao M
- Producers: WiiKeed; Glory Face; Yokan; Jake K

Momoland chronology
Wonderful Love (2017)	Freeze! (2017)	Great! (2018)

Singles from Freeze!
- 1. "Freeze" Released: August 22, 2017

Freeze! is the second extended play by South Korean girl group Momoland. It was released by Duble Kick Entertainment and distributed by Kakao M on August 22, 2017. For the extended play, Momoland worked with a variety of producers including Duble Sidekick, WiiKeed, Glory Face, Tenzo & Tasco, Yokan and Jake K. Freeze! consists of six tracks including the single "Freeze" and its instrumental, three other new tracks and the EDM version of the previously released single "Wonderful Love".

To promote the extended play, the group performed on several South Korean music show programs, such as M Countdown and Inkigayo. Commercially, the album peaked at number seventeen on South Korea's Gaon Album Chart.

== Background and release ==
Momoland released their single album Wonderful Love featuring the lead single of the same name in April 2017. The single featured new members Daisy and Taeha. Following the release of "Wonderful Love", it was announced on August 8, 2017, the release of the group's second extended play. Prior to the release, teasers featuring photos of Momoland from the extended play's photoshoot, a snippet of the extended play and clips from music video of "Freeze" were released online in August 2017.

The extended play was officially released on August 22, 2017, by Duble Kick Entertainment and distributed by Kakao M as the group's third extended play, with "Freeze" serving as the lead single.

== Commercial performance ==
In South Korea, the extended play debuted and peaked at number seventeen on the Gaon Album Chart for the week of August 27, 2017. It was the sixty-third best-selling album for the month August 2017 with 2,234 physical copies sold.

== Track listing ==
Standard edition
No.	Title	Lyrics	Music	Arrangement	Length
1.	"Freeze" (꼼짝마)	Duble Sidekick; Jinli	Duble Sidekick; WiiKeed; Jinli; Glory Face	WiiKeed; Glory Face	3:12
2.	"I Like It" (좋아)	1Take; Tenzo & Tasco	Tenzo & Tasco; 1Take		3:10
3.	"What Planet Are You From?" (너, 어느 별에서 왔니)	Duble Sidekick; Jinli; Kim Su Jeong	Yokan	Yokan	3:39
4.	"Orgel" (오르골)	JQ; Seong Hyeon Bae; Jinli	Glory Face; Duble Sidekick; Jinli; Jake K	Glory Face; Jake K	3:27
5.	"Wonderful Love" (어마어마해, EDM version)	Duble Sidekick; Tenzo & Tasco; Long Candy	Duble Sidekick; Long Candy; The Cannels	Myo	3:23
6.	"Freeze" (꼼짝마, Instrumental)		Duble Sidekick; WiiKeed; Jinli; Glory Face	WiiKeed; Glory Face	3:12

== Charts ==
Chart performance for Freeze!
Chart (2017)	Peak position
South Korea (Gaon Album Chart)	17

== Credits and personnel ==
Credits adapted from Melon.

- Momoland – vocals (1, 2, 3, 4, 5)
- 1Take – lyricist (2), composer (2)
- The Cannels – composer (5)
- Duble Sidekick – lyricist (1, 3, 5), composer (1, 4, 5, 6)
- Glory Face – composer (1, 4, 6), arrangement (1, 4, 6)
- Seong Hyeon Bae – lyricist (4)
- Jake K – composer (4), arrangement (4)
- Jinli – lyricist (1, 3, 4), composer (1, 4, 6)
- JQ – lyricist (4)
- Kim Su Jeong – lyricist (3)
- Long Candy – lyricist (5), composer (5)
- Myo – arrangement (5)
- Tenzo & Tasco – lyricist (2, 5), composer (2)
- WiiKeed – composer (1, 6), arrangement (1, 6)
- Yokan – composer (3), arrangement (3)

== Release history ==
Release dates and formats for Freeze!
Region	Date	Format	Label
South Korea	August 22, 2017	CD; digital download; streaming	Dublekick Entertainment; Kakao M
Various	August 22, 2017	Digital download; streaming	Dublekick Entertainment; Kakao M
