= Duble Sidekick =

South Korean music duo

Duble Sidekick 이단옆차기
- Origin: Seoul, South Korea
- Genre: K-pop
- Occupation: Music producers
- Years active: 2010–present
- Labels: Duble Kick Entertainment; MLD Entertainment; Interscope Records; RCA
- Members: Park Jang-geun; Ham Jun Seok
- Past members: Lee Yong Hwan; Mikey

Duble Sidekick (Korean: 이단옆차기; RR: Idanyeopchagi) is a South Korean music producer and songwriting duo consisting of lyricist Park Jang-geun and composer Mikey (also known as Chancellor and formerly a member of One Way). The duo was formed in 2010, and rose to fame after producing MBLAQ's 2012 EP 100% Ver. Since then, they have produced many hit songs. From 2011 to 2013, the pair also produced songs under the mantle of 우리형과 내동생, reserved for music with a softer and sweeter atmosphere. In late 2012, they expanded their team to include more composers and started their own entertainment agency called Duble Kick Entertainment. Wellmade Yedang became the agency's largest shareholder in May 2014.

== Production discography ==
Artist	Album	Song(s)	Year
2PM	Grown	"Game Over"	2013
Ailee	Invitation	"Into the Storm" (폭풍속으로)	2012
Ailee	VIVID	Mind Your Own Business (너나잘해)	2015
Airi Suzuki	Do me a favor	"Good Night"	2018
Apink	Pink Blossom	"Mr. Chu"	2014
Apink	Pink Luv	"Once Upon a Time" (동화 같은 사랑); "Good Morning Baby"	2014
Apink	Dear	"Cause You're My Star" (별의 별)	2016
Apink	Look	"Yummy"	2020
Baek Ji-young	Good Boy	"Good Boy"	2012
B.A.P.	Crash	"Crash" (대박사건)	2012
B.A.P.	Stop It	"Stop It" (하지마)	2012
BAE173	Intersection: Trace	"Loved You" (사랑했다)	2021
Bestie	I Need You	"I Need You"; "Hot Baby"; "Thank U Very Much"	2014
Bestie	Love Emotion	"Excuse Me"	2015
Boys Republic	Dress Up	"Dress Up" (예쁘게 입고 나와)	2014
Boys Republic	Real Talk	"The Real One" (진짜가 나타났다)	2014
Boys Republic	Hello	"Hello"	2015
CLC	First Love	"Pepe"	2015
CLC	Question	"Lucky"	2015
Davichi	Mystic Ballad	"Turtle" (거북이)	2013
DMTN	State Of Emergency	"E.R"	2012
GFriend	Sunny Summer	"Sunny Summer" (여름여름해)	2018
Girl's Day	Everyday 3	"G.D.P" (Intro); "Something"; "Whistle" (휘파람); "Show You"	2014
Girl's Day	Everyday 4	"Darling"; "Look at Me"; "Timing"	2014
Girl's Day	I Miss You	"I Miss You" (보고싶어)	2014
Girl's Day	Love	"Hello Bubble"	2015
G.NA	G.NA's Secret	"Pretty Lingerie" (예쁜 속옷)	2014
g.o.d	Chapter 8	"The Lone Duckling" (미운오리새끼)	2014
Hyolyn	Love & Hate	"Don't Love Me" (사랑 하지 마); "Red Lipstick" (립스틱 짙게 바르고); "Falling"	2013
I.O.I	Chrysalis	"Knock Knock Knock"(똑 똑 똑)	2016
Jung Eun-ji	Dream	"Hopefully Sky (ft. 하림)"(하늘바라기); "Hopefully Sky (Piano Ver.)"(하늘바라기)	2016
Jung Eun-ji	The Space	"The Spring (ft. 하림)"(너란 봄); "First Farewell (ft. Kwak Jin-eon)"(처음 느껴본 이별); "Moon of Seoul"(서울의 달); "The Spring (Piano Ver.)"(너란 봄)	2017
Jun Hyoseong	Top Secret	"Good-Night Kiss"	2014
Jiyeon	Never Ever	"1 Minute 1 Second" (1분 1초)	2014
Jihu	Heroina	"Heroina"	2019
JJCC	JJCC 1st Mini Album	"OneWay"	2014
Kara	Day & Night	"Live"; "Mamma Mia"; "So Good"; "Melancholy (24/7)"; "Red Light" (빨간불)	2014
Kim Jae-hwan	Moment	"The Time I Need" (시간이 필요해); "Nuna" (누나)	2019
K.Will	Will in Fall	"You Don't Know Love"	2013
Leessang with Yoojin of The SeeYa	Duble Sidekick Vol .2	"Tears"	2013
Lyn	LYn 8th #2	"I Like This Song"	2013
Mamamoo	Melting	"You're The Best"	2016
MAP6	Swagger Time	"Swagger Time" (매력발산타임); "Love Is You" (밀당)	2016
MBLAQ	100% Ver. (and BLAQ% Ver.)	"Run"; "This Is War" (전쟁이야); "Scribble" (낙서); "She's Breathtaking" (아찔한 그녀); "Hello My EX"	2012
MBLAQ	Broken	"Key" (열쇠)	2014
Momoland	Welcome to Momoland	"Welcome to Momoland"; "Jjan! Koong! Kwang!" (짠쿵쾅); "Lovesick" (상사병); "A Fuss" (어기여차)	2016
Momoland	Wonderful Love	"Wonderful Love" (어마어마해)	2017
Momoland	Freeze!	"Freeze" (꼼짝마); "I Like It" (좋아); "What Planet Are You From?" (너, 어느 별에서 왔니); "Orgel" (오르골); "Wonderful Love EDM ver." (어마어마해)	2017
Momoland	Love is Only You	"Love is Only You (Momola X Erik)" " (사랑은 너 하나)	2019
Momoland	Thumbs Up	"Thumbs Up"	2019
NU'EST	Sleep Talking	"Sleep Talking" (잠꼬대)	2013
Secret	Secret Summer	"I'm in Love"	2014
Sistar	Loving U	"Loving U"; "Holiday"	2012
Sistar	Give It to Me	"Miss Sistar"; "Give It to Me"; "The Way You Make Me Melt" (넌 너무 야해); "A Week" (일주일); "Hey You"	2013
Sistar	Touch & Move	"Naughty Hands" (나쁜손)	2014
Sistar	Sweet & Sour	"I Swear"	2014
Sistar	"Shake It"	"Shake It"	2015
Song Jieun	25	"Twenty Five" (예쁜 나이 25살)	2014
T-ara	Again	"Don't Get Married"	2013
T-ara	And & End	"I Don't Want You" (남주긴 아까워)	2014
T-ara N4	Jeon Won Diary	"Jeon Won Diary" (전원일기; Jeon Won Ilgi) (Feat. Duble Sidekick, Taewoon); "Can We Love" (Feat. Duble Sidekick); "Jeon Won Diary (Electronic)" (Feat. Duble Sidekick, Taewoon); "Jeon Won Diary (MR ver.)"; "Can We Love (Instrumental)"	2013
T1419	Before Sunrise Part. 1	"Asurabalbalta" (아수라발발타)	2021
Turbo	Again	"Again" (다시); "Dancing Queen" (댄싱퀸); "Are You Living Well? (ft.Lena Park" (잘 지내); "Butterfly Effect" (나비효과); "Skit"; "Top 10 Song (ft. Lee Haneul, Jinu, Lee Sangmin)" (가요 톱 10); "We (ft. K.Will & Jessi)" (우리)	2015
Two X	Double Up	"Double Up"	2012
Uee	Barefooted Friends: My Story, My Song	"Hero"	2013
ZE:A	Illusion	"The Ghost of Wind" (바람의 유령)	2013
Zia	—N/a	"Tears Falling Down" (눈물이 툭)	2012

== Awards and nominations ==
=== Melon Music Awards ===
Year	Nominee / work	Award	Result
2012	Duble Sidekick (Sistar's "Loving U", Baek Ji-young's "Voice", "Good Boy")	Songwriter Award	Won

=== Gaon Chart K-Pop Awards ===
Year	Nominee / work	Award	Result
2013	Duble Sidekick	Composer of the Year	Won

== See also ==
- Shinsadong Tiger
- Brave Brothers
