= Simply K-Pop =

- Genre: Music, Entertainment
- Presented by: Wonjin, Allen (Cravity)
- Country of origin: South Korea
- Original languages: English and Korean
- No. of episodes: 619

Production
- Running time: 52 minutes (regular); 85 minutes (livestream)
- Production company: Arirang TV

Original release
- Network: Arirang TV
- Release: 2011 – present

Simply K-Pop (Korean: 심플리 케이팝; also known as Simply K-pop Con-Tour or Simply Con-tour) is a South Korean music television program broadcast by Arirang TV. Originally called The M-Wave, the show's title was changed to Wave K in 2011, and renamed again in 2012 to Simply K-Pop. It airs live worldwide every Friday at 1:00PM KST, and is broadcast from Arirang Tower in Seocho-dong, Seoul.

Currently hosted by Wonjin and Allen of Cravity, the show features K-pop stars who perform on stage and interact with the audience throughout each episode. It was previously available for online streaming via Viki with multilingual subtitles until May 2024—it was also previously available on DramaFever until the site shut down in 2018. Reruns of the show air on the free Philippine digital TV channel Hallypop every Sunday at 6:30 PM.

Since April 19, 2021, on the Mondays of each two weeks, Simply K-pop is airing Simply K-pop Con-Tour to "travel" to each country. This is livestreamed in Youtube. Simply K-pop is now also known as Simply K-pop Con-Tour.

== Simply K-Pop Awards ==
Best of Simply K-Pop awardees 2015–2016
Best Rising Star	Best Performance
2015
Male: Monsta X; Female: Twice	Male: BTS – "Run"; Female: Red Velvet – "Dumb Dumb"
2016
Male: NCT U; Female: I.O.I	Male: Infinite – "The Eye"; VIXX – "Fantasy"; Female: Apink – "Only One"; GFriend – "Navillera"; Laboum – "Journey to Atlantis"

== Awards and nominations ==
Name of the award ceremony, year presented, category, nominee of the award, and the result of the nomination
Award ceremony	Year	Category	Nominee / Work	Result	Ref.
Korea Cable TV Awards	2023	Global Award	Simply K-Pop Con-Tour	Won	

== Similar programs ==
- SBS Inkigayo
- KBS Music Bank
- MBC Show! Music Core
- Mnet M Countdown
- Arirang TV Pops in Seoul
- Arirang TV Show K-Pop
- JTBC Music Universe K-909
- MBC M Show Champion
- SBS M The Show

== See also ==
- Music programs of South Korea
