= Solo (Don McLean album) =

Live album by Don McLean
- Released: October 1976
- Recorded: October 1973
- Genre: Rock
- Label: United Artists
- Producer: John Peters, Herb Gart

Don McLean chronology
Homeless Brother (1974)	Solo (1976)	Prime Time (1977)

Solo is a Don McLean double live album. It was recorded live in Manchester, Bristol, London, and Oxford, England.

Professional ratings
Review scores
Source	Rating
Allmusic	link

== Track listing ==
All tracks composed by Don McLean except where indicated.

Side One

1. "Magdalene Lane"
2. "Masters of War" (Bob Dylan)
3. "Wonderful Baby"
4. "Where Were You, Baby?" (Josh White)
5. "Empty Chairs"
6. "Geordie's Lost His Penker" (Traditional; arranged and adapted by Don McLean)
7. "Babylon"

Side Two

1. "And I Love You So"
2. "Mactavish Is Dead" (Traditional; arranged and adapted by Don McLean)
3. "Cripple Creek/Muleskinner Blues" (Traditional; arranged and adapted by Don McLean / George Vaughn, Jimmie Rodgers)
4. "Great Big Man"
5. "Bronco Bill's Lament"
6. "Happy Trails" (Dale Evans)
7. "Circus Song"
8. "Birthday Song"
9. "On the Amazon" (Vivian Ellis, Clifford Grey)

Side Three

1. "American Pie"
2. "Over the Waterfall/Arkansas Traveller" (Traditional; arranged and adapted by Don McLean)
3. "Homeless Brother"
4. "Castles in the Air"
5. Three Flights Up"

Side Four

1. "Lovesick Blues" (Irving Mills, Cliff Friend)
2. "Winter Has Me in Its Grip"
3. "The Legend of Andrew McCrew"
4. "Dreidel"
5. "Vincent"
6. "Till Tomorrow"

== Personnel ==
- Don McLean - acoustic guitar, banjo, vocals, executive producer
- Herb Gart - producer
- John Peters - producer, mixing
- Greg Calbi - mastering
- Jesse Henderson, Vic Maile, Gil Markle - engineer
