= Dominion (Don McLean album) =

Live album by Don McLean
- Released: 1982
- Recorded: 1980
- Venue: The Dominion Theatre, London
- Genre: Rock
- Label: Festival

Don McLean chronology
Believers (1981)	Dominion (1982)	Love Tracks (1987)

Dominion is a live album by American singer-songwriter Don McLean, released in 1982. It was recorded at a performance at the Dominion Theatre, London, in 1980. It was reissued in 1990 on CD. It has also been released as Greatest Hits Live.

Professional ratings
Review scores
Source	Rating
Allmusic	link

== Track listing ==
1. "It's Just the Sun"
2. "Building My Body"
3. "Wonderful Baby"
4. "The Very Thought of You"
5. "Fool's Paradise"
6. "Baby I Don't Care"
7. "You Have Lived"
8. "The Statue"
9. "Prime Time"
10. "American Pie"
11. "Left for Dead"
12. "Believers"
13. "Sea Man"
14. "It's a Beautiful Life"
15. "Chain Lightning"
16. "Crazy Eyes"
17. "La I Love You"
18. "Dream Lover"
19. "Crying"
20. "Vincent"

== Notes ==
- "The Very Thought of You" composed by Ray Noble
- "Fool's Paradise" composed by Horace Linsley and Norman Petty
- "Baby I Don't Care" composed by Mike Stoller with lyrics by Jerry Leiber
- "Crying" composed by Joe Melson and Roy Orbison
- "Dream Lover" composed by Bobby Darin

All other songs by Don McLean.
