= Believers (Don McLean album) =

Studio album by Don McLean
- Released: October 29, 1981
- Studio: Sound Emporium (Nashville, Tennessee)
- Genre: Rock
- Length: 46:39
- Label: Millennium
- Producer: Larry Butler

Don McLean chronology
Chain Lightning (1978)	Believers (1981)	Dominion (1982)

Singles from Believers
- 1. "Castles in the Air" Released: October 1981

Professional ratings
Review scores
Source	Rating
AllMusic	3/5 stars

Believers is the eighth studio album by American singer-songwriter Don McLean, released on October 29, 1981.

The album leads off with a re-recording of "Castles in the Air", a song which originally appeared on McLean's 1970 debut album Tapestry. Released as a single, it reached #7 on the Billboard Adult Contemporary chart and #36 on the Hot 100 chart.

== Track listing ==
All tracks composed by Don McLean, except where indicated.

1. "Castles in the Air" 3:43
2. "Isn't It Strange" 4:19
3. "Left for Dead on the Road of Love" 2:57
4. "Believers" 6:16
5. "Sea Man" 4:12
6. "I Tune the World Out" 3:32
7. "Love Hurts" (Boudleaux Bryant) 3:08
8. "Jerusalem" 4:43
9. "Love Letters" (Edward Heyman, Victor Young) 3:59
10. "Crazy Eyes" 2:56
11. "Sea Cruise" (Huey "Piano" Smith) 3:06
12. "Dream Lover" (Bobby Darin) 3:48

== Chart positions ==
Chart (1981/82)	Peak position
Australian (Kent Music Report)	15
Billboard 200	156

== Personnel ==
- Don McLean – vocals, guitar
- Ray Edenton, Billy Sanford, James Capps, Jerry Shook, Steve Chapman – guitars
- Sheldon Kurland – strings
- Dennis Solee – saxophone
- Hargus "Pig" Robbins, David Briggs – piano
- Bob Moore – bass guitar
- Leon Rhodes – six–string bass guitar
- Jerry Carrigan, Gene Chrisman – drums
- Ronald Vaughan – percussion
- The Jordanaires – backing vocals
- Bill Justis – string arrangements
- Larry Butler – producer
