= Martin Watier =

Canadian actor (born 1973)

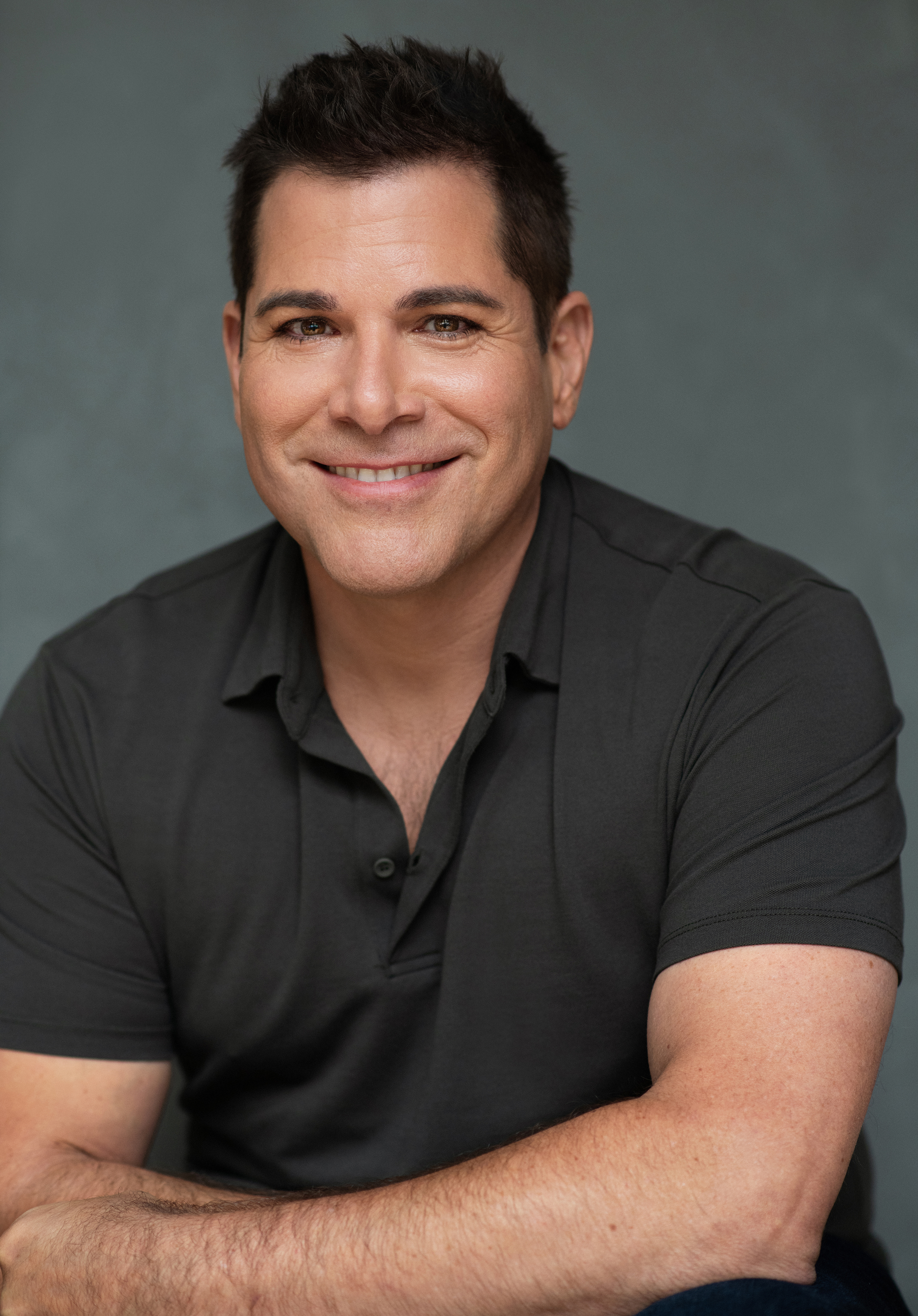
- Born: October 25, 1973 (age 53); Montreal, Quebec, Canada
- Occupations: Actor; director
- Years active: 1993–present

Martin Watier (born October 25, 1973) is a Canadian actor born in Montreal. Specializing in dubbing, he is, among other things, the official French voice of actors including Colin Farrell, Jude Law, Jake Gyllenhaal, Josh Hartnett, Kevin Hart, Mark Wahlberg, Ben Foster and Paul Walker.

== Early life ==
Born in Montreal, Watier started studying music at the age of five. During his high school years, his passion for acting developed: in 1985 he began studies in drama with Quebec actors Normand d’Amour and Henri Chassé.

In 1990, his background in music (piano and voice) along with his talent as a young actor earned him a scholarship to Upper Canada College, in Toronto, where he spent the next two years studying acting and musical theatre. In 1992, he was awarded the Robertson Davies Drama Award for outstanding onstage performance for his interpretation of Amadeus in Peter Shaffer's Amadeus.

== Career ==
=== Film and theater ===
He returned to Montreal in 1993 to launch his professional career. There he studied acting, singing and dancing with teachers such as Warren Robertson, Estelle Esse and Danielle Hotte. In a short time, Watier landed parts in plays and musicals (Jeanne, Bang Boy, Bang, Jerusalem), on English television (University, Sirens, The Hunger, Student Bodies) and French television (Watatatow, Zap, Catherine, 3 X rien, Annie et ses hommes), and in movies (Hemingway : A Portrait, Laserhawk, The Deception Trilogy, Polytechnique), and in numerous commercials.

=== Dubbing ===
In 1995 he discovered voice work. Since then, he regularly worked in the field of dubbing, narration and animation. Lending his voice to foreign actors, but also to fantastic characters and cartoons, he is able to give free rein to his creativity and overflowing imagination. Over the years, he became the official French voice of many American actors including Colin Farrell, Josh Hartnett, Jude Law, Jake Gyllenhaal, Kevin Hart, Mark Wahlberg, James Franco, Ben Foster, James Marsden, Paul Walker and Ryan Philippe. He also dubs and creates original voices for cartoons and video games, and lends his voice to audio books and documentaries of all kinds.

== Theater and musicals ==
- Amadeus : Amadeus
- Opéra - Le Prix : Bernard
- Bang Boy, Bang : Rod
- Jeanne, The Musical : Bastard of Orleans
- Jerusalem, The Musical : Hassan
- Le Royaume des Devins : Cal

== Filmography ==
=== Movie ===
- Rowing Through : The waiter
- The Deception Trilogy : Bill
- Laserhawk : Troy
- Hemingway: A Portrait : Hemingway

=== Television ===
==== Television series ====
- Heart of Courage : Ambrosio
- Watatatow : Alex (le skin head)
- Are you Afraid of the Dark? : Jacques
- Catherine : Stéphane
- Sirens : Sean Jenkins
- Zap : Gustave-Emmanuel Soleil (Gugus)
- Student Bodies : DJ
- Le Volcan tranquille : le télégraphiste
- The Hunger : Jean-Pierre
- La Courte Échelle : Gorgo
- The Hunger II : Tony
- 3X Rien : Francis
- Annie et ses hommes : Jean-Yves
- University : Sébastien

==== Television films ====
- Crosswinds : Ollie
- Terre d'espoir : Georges
- Glory: War at Sea : Hal Lawrence
- The War of 1812 : Richardson
- The Patty Duke Show: Still Rockin' in Brooklyn Heights : Anthony Baker
- P.T. Barnum : Johnson
- The Audrey Hepburn Story : Gaston

== French dubbing ==
=== Film ===
==== Feature films ====
- Colin Farrell (30 films) :
  - Hors-la-loi américains (2001) : Jesse James
  - Le Nouvel Agent (2003) : James Clayton
  - SWAT (2003) : Jim Street
  - Intermède (2003) : Lehiff
  - Alexandre (2004) : Alexandre
  - Le Nouveau Monde (2005) : John Smith
  - Deux flics à Miami (2006) : James "Sonny" Crocket
  - En toute loyauté (2008) : Jimmy Egan
  - Bienvenue à Bruges (2008) : Ray
  - Ondine (2009) : Syracuse
  - Crazy Heart (2009) : Tommy Sweet
  - Les Chemins de la liberté (2010) : Valka
  - Méchants Patrons (2011) : Bobby Pellitt
  - Vampire, vous avez dit vampire ? (2011) : Jerry Dandrige
  - Total Recall : Mémoires programmées (2012) : Doug Quaid/Hauser
  - Les Psychopathes (2012) : Marty
  - Mort et enterré (2013) : Victor
  - Sauvons Moscow (2013) : Travers Goff
  - Conte d'hiver (2014) : Peter Lake
  - Les Animaux fantastiques (2016) : Graves
  - Roman J. Israel, Esq (2017) : Georges Pierce
  - La mise à mort du cerf sacré (2017) : Steven Murphy
  - Veuves (2018) : Jack Mulligan
  - Dumbo (2019) : Holt Farrier
  - Les Gentlemen (2020) : Coach
  - Ava (2020) : Simon
  - Voyagers (2021) : Richard
  - Le Batman (2022) : Oswald Cobblepot / le Pingouin
  - Treize Vies (2022) : John Volanthen
  - After Yang (2022) : Jake
- Josh Hartnett (20 films) :
  - Les Ensaignants (1998) : Zeke Tyler
  - Cri ultime (1999) : Trip Fontaine
  - Coup de peigne (2001) : Brian Allen
  - La Chute du faucon noir (2001) : le sergent Matt Eversmann
  - La Ronde des cocus (2001) : Tom Stoddard
  - 40 jours et 40 nuits (2002) : Matt Sullivan
  - Homicide à Hollywood (2003) : K.C. Calden
  - L'Appartement (2004) : Matthew
  - Une histoire de Sin City (2005) : The Man
  - Mozart et la Baleine (2005) : Donald Morton
  - Le Dahlia noir (2006) : Dwight "Bucky" Bleichert
  - Bonne Chance Slevin (2006) : Slevin Kelevra
  - Sortis de l'ombre (2007) : Erik Kernan
  - 30 Jours de nuit (2007) : Eben Oleson
  - August (2008) : Tom Sterling
  - Suspect numéro un (2020) : Victor Malarek
  - Operation Fortune: Ruse de guerre (2023) : Danny Francesco
  - Oppenheimer (2023) : Ernest Lawrence
  - Trap (2024) : Cooper
- Jude Law (20 films) :
  - Retour à Cold Mountain (2003) : Inman
  - L'Aviateur (2004) : Errol Flynn
  - Alfie (2004) : Alfie
  - Les Vacances (2006) : Graham
  - Sherlock Holmes (2009) : Docteur Watson
  - L'Imaginarium du docteur Parnassus (2009) : Tony (2nd métamorphose)
  - Les Repreneurs (2010) : Remy
  - Sherlock Holmes : Le Jeu des ombres (2011) : Docteur Watson
  - Hugo (2011) : Hugo's Father
  - Contagion (2011) : Alan Krumwiede
  - Anna Karénine (2012) : Alexei Karénine
  - Effets secondaires (2013) : Jonathan Banks
  - Espionne (2015) : Bradley Fine
  - Genius (2016) : Thomas Wolfe
  - Le Roi Arthur : La Légende d'Excalibur (2017) : Vortigern
  - Capitaine Marvel (2019) : Yon-Rogg
  - Le Rythme de la vengeance (2020) : Boyd
  - The Nest (2020) : Rory O'Hara
  - The Order (2024) : Terry Husk
  - Eden (2024) : Ritter
- Kevin Hart (19 films) :
  - Film de Peur 3 (2003) : CJ
  - Voici Polly (2004) : Vic
  - Le Dernier Rempart (2006) : F Stop/G Spot
  - Film de Peur 4 (2006) : CJ
  - Film de super-héros (2008) : Trey
  - Chasse au Trésor (2008) : Big Bunny
  - Ados Extrêmes (2008) : Barry
  - Combat revanche (2013) : Dante Slate Jr
  - Prison 101 (2015) : Darnell Lewis
  - Mise à l'épreuve 2 (2016) : Ben Barber
  - Agence de renseignement (2016) : Calvin Joyner
  - Jumanji (2017) : Fridge
  - Cours du soir (2018) : Teddy
  - Sous un autre jour (2018) : Dell
  - Rapides et dangereux présentent Hobbs et Shaw (2019) : Air Marshall Dinkley
  - Jumanji: Le Prochain niveau (2019) : Mouse Finbar / Fridge
  - Die Hart (2023) : Kevin Hart
  - Die Hart: Die Harter (2024) : Kevin Hart
  - Borderlands (2024) : Roland
- Jake Gyllenhaal (17 films) :
  - Déroute (2002) : Pilot Kelson
  - Souvenirs de Brokeback Mountain (2005) : Jack Twist
  - La Preuve Irréfutable (2005) : Hal
  - Détention secrète (2007) : Douglas Freeman
  - Frères (2009) : Tommy Cahill
  - Code Source (2011) : Colter Stevens
  - La Force de l'ordre (2012) : Brian Taylor
  - Ennemi (2013) : Adam et Anthony
  - Prisonniers (2013) : l'inspecteur Loki
  - Le Gaucher (2015) : Billy Hope
  - Démolition (2015) : Davis Mitchell
  - Animaux nocturnes (2016) : Tony Hastings / Edward Sheffield
  - Vie (2017) : Dr David Jordan
  - Debout (2017) : Jeff Bauman
  - Spider-Man: Loin des siens (2019) : Quentin Beck / Mystério
  - Ambulance (2022) : Danny Sharp
  - Road House (2024) : Dalton
- Mark Wahlberg (15 films) :
  - Nuits Endiablées (1997) : Eddie Adams/Dirk Diggler
  - Quatre Frères (2005) : Bobby Mercer
  - Agents troubles (2006) : Dignam
  - Max Payne (2008) : Max Payne
  - Le Coup de grâce (2010) : Mickey Ward
  - Ted (2012) : John Bennett
  - Quitte ou Double (2013) : Marcus "Stig" Stigman
  - Transformers : L'Âge de l'extinction (2014) : Cade Yeager
  - Ted 2 (2015) : John Bennett
  - Crise à Deepwater Horizon (2016) : Mike Williams
  - Le jour des Patriotes (2017) : Tommy Saunders
  - Transformers : Le Dernier Chevalier (2017) : Cade Yeager
  - Cible 22 (2018) : Silva
  - Uncharted (2022) : Victor Sullivan
  - Arthur the King (2024) : Michael
- James Franco (15 films) :
  - Une ville près de la mer (2002) : Joey
  - Le Grand Raid (2005) : Captain Prince
  - L'Escadrille Lafayette (2006) : Blaine Rawlings
  - Tristan et Yseult (2006) : Tristan
  - Milk (2008) : Scott Smith
  - Le Temps d'un ouragan (2008) : Mark Flanner
  - Ananas Express (2008) : Saul Silver
  - 127 Heures (2010) : Aron Ralston
  - La Montée de la Planète des singes (2011) : Will Rodman
  - Protection (2013) : Gater
  - Oz, le magnifique (2013) : Oz
  - Honnêtes citoyens (2014) : Tom Wright
  - La Veille (2015) : James Franco
  - Pourquoi lui (2016) : Laird Mayhew
  - L'Artiste du désastre (2017) : Tommy /Johnny
- Ben Foster (14 films) :
  - Songe d'une nuit d'ados (2001) : Berke Landers
  - Le Punisher : Les Liens du sang (2004) : Spacker Dave
  - Otages de la peur (2005) : Mars Krupcheck
  - Mâle Alpha (2006) : Jake Mazursky
  - 3 h 10 pour Yuma (2007) : Charlie Prince
  - Le Messager (2009) : le sergent Will Montgomery
  - Le Mécano (2011) : Steve McKenna
  - Contrebande (2012) : Sebastian Abney
  - Warcraft : Le Commencement (2016) : Medivh
  - Inferno (2016) : Bertrand Zobrist
  - Hostiles (2017) : Philip Wills
  - The Contractor (2022) : Mike
  - Medieval (2022) : Jan Žižka
  - Sharp Corner (2024) : Josh McCall
- Paul Walker (13 films) :
  - Voici les Deedles (1998) : Phil Deedle
  - Les Pros du Collège (1999) : Lance Harbor
  - The Skulls : Société secrète (2000) : Caleb Mandrake
  - Virée d'enfer (2001) : Lewis Thomas
  - Rapides et Dangereux (2001) : Brian O'Conner
  - Rapides et Dangereux 2 (2003) : Brian O'Conner
  - Bleu d'enfer (2005) : Jared
  - Bobby Z (2007) : Tim Kearney
  - Rapides et Dangereux 4 (2009) : Brian O'Conner
  - Rapides et Dangereux 5 (2011) : Brian O'Conner
  - Rapides et Dangereux 6 (2013) : Brian O'Conner
  - Aucun détour (2013) : Michael Woods
  - Dangereux 7 (2015) : Brian O'Conner
- James Marsden (12 films) :
  - Commérages (2000) : Derrick Webb
  - Les Pages de notre amour (2004) : Lon Hammond Jr.
  - Il était une fois (2007) : le prince Edward
  - Hairspray (2007) : Corny Collins
  - Plein Gaz (2008) : Rex
  - Une seconde chance (2014) : Dawson Cole
  - Dans l'antre du grizzly (2015) : Rowan
  - Affaires non classées (2015) : Jim Spinch
  - Sonic le hérisson (2020) : Tom Wachowski
  - Sonic le hérisson 2 (2022) : Tom Wachowski
  - Knox Goes Away (2024) : Miles Knox
  - Sonic le hérisson 3 (2024) : Tom Wachowski
- Ryan Phillippe (12 films) :
  - Couples à la Dérive (1998) : Keenan
  - Studio 54 (1998) : Shane O'Shea
  - Un Pari Cruel (1999) : Sebastian Valmont
  - Antitrust (2001) : Milo Hoffman
  - Igby en chute libre (2002) : Oliver "Ollie" Slocumb
  - Crash (2004) : l'officier Hanson
  - Échec et Mort (2006) : Martin
  - Brèche (2007) : Eric O'Neill
  - Le Bang Bang Club (2010) : Greg Marinovich
  - MacGruber (2010) : le lieutenant Dixon Piper
  - Braqueurs (2011) : Vincent
  - La Défense Lincoln (2011) : Louis Roulet
- Orlando Bloom (10 films) :
  - Pirates des Caraïbes : La Malédiction de la Perle noire (2003) : Will Turner
  - Havre (2004) : Shy
  - Troie (2004) : Paris
  - Elizabethtown (2005) : Drew Baylor
  - Pirates des Caraïbes : Le Coffre du mort (2006) : Will Turner
  - Pirates des Caraïbes : Jusqu'au bout du monde (2007) : Will Turner
  - Pirates des Caraïbes : Les morts ne racontent pas d'histoires (2017) : Will Turner
  - Assiégés (2020) : le capitaine Ben Keating
  - Gran Turismo (2023) : Danny Moore
  - Deep Cover (2025) : Marlon
- Hugh Dancy (9 films) :
  - Ella l'ensorcelée (2004) : Char
  - Basic Instinct 2 (2006) : Adam Towers
  - Sang et Chocolat (2007) : Aiden
  - Confessions d'une accro du shopping (2009) : Luke Brandon
  - Adam (2009) : Adam Raki
  - Martha Marcy May Marlene (2011) : Ted
  - Notre idiot de frère (2011) : Christian
  - Fin de soirée (2019) : Charlie Fain
  - Downton Abbey : Une nouvelle ère (2022) : Jack Barber
- Johnny Knoxville (8 films) :
  - Les Voyous de Brooklyn (2002) : Vinnie Fish
  - Justice sauvage (2004) : Ray Templeton
  - La vie secrète de Daltry Calhoun (2005) : Daltry Calhoun
  - Shérif, fais-moi peur (2005) : Luke Duke
  - Les Seigneurs de Dogtown (2005) : Topper Burks
  - Le Dernier Combat (2013) : Lewis Dinkum
  - Les 2 de pique (2016) : Connor Watts
  - Jackass toujours (2021) : lui-même
- Jason Priestley (7 films) :
  - Amour et mort à Long Island (1997) : Ronnie Bostock
  - Voyeur (1999) : Gary
  - Pourchassé (2000) : Breakfast
  - Sombres Secrets (2002) : Micheal Pacer
  - Au Rythme de l'amour (2002) : Asa Gemmil
  - Chicks with Sticks (2004) : Steve Cooper
  - Zoom (2015) : Dale
- Chris Klein (6 films) :
  - Dites-moi que je rêve (2001) : Gilbert Noble
  - Nous étions soldats (2002) : lieutenant Jack Geoghegan
  - Rollerball (2002) : Jonathan Cross
  - Un long week-end (2005) : Cooper
  - American Dreamz (2006) : William Williams
  - Street Fighter : La légende de Chun-Li (2009) : Charlie Nash
- Jay Hernandez (6 films) :
  - Folle / Magnifique (2001) : Carlos Nuñez
  - Échelle 49 (2004) : Keith Perez
  - Impact fatal (2004) : Dalton
  - L'Auberge (2005) : Paxton
  - L'Auberge II (2007) : Paxton
  - Max (2015) : le sergent Reyes
  - L'Escadron suicide (2016) : Diablo
- Hayden Christensen (6 films) :
  - Star Wars, épisode II : L'Attaque des clones (2002) : Anakin Skywalker
  - Star Wars, épisode III : La Revanche des Sith (2005) : Anakin Skywalker
  - Portrait d'une muse (2006) : Billy Quinn 'Musician'
  - Instinct de tueur (2017) : Will
  - Little Italy (2018) : Leo Campo
  - Star Wars, épisode IX : L'Ascension de Skywalker (2019) : Anakin Skywalker
- Hill Harper (6 films) :
  - Infiltration (1999) : Breezy T.
  - Love, Sex and Eating the Bones (2003) : Michael
  - A Good Man Is Hard To Find (2008) : Damion Marshall
  - Le Garçon d'à côté (2015) : le principal Edward Warren
  - Commotion (2015) : Christopher Jones
  - All Eyez on Me (2017) : l'intervieweur
- Chris Pine (6 films) :
  - Star Trek (2009) : James T. Kirk
  - Star Trek vers les Ténèbres (2013) : James T. Kirk
  - Les Heures de gloire (2016) : Bernie Webber
  - Star Trek : Sans limites (2016) : James T. Kirk
  - Un raccourci dans le temps (2017) : Dr Alex Murry
  - Ne t'inquiète pas chérie (2022) : Frank
- Freddie Prinze Jr. (5 films) :
  - Elle a tout pour elle (1999) : Zach Siler
  - Des gars, des filles (2000) : Ryan Walker
  - La Fille de mes rêves (2000) : Alfred "Al" Connelly
  - Scooby-Doo (2002) : Fred Jones
  - Scooby-Doo 2 : Monstres en liberté (2004) : Fred Jones
- Patrick Fugit (5 films) :
  - Laurier blanc (2002) : Paul Trout
  - L'Assistant du vampire (2009) : Evra, le garçon-serpent
  - Nous avons acheté un zoo (2011) : Robin Jone
  - Les Apparences (2014) : l'officier James Gilpin
  - Le Premier Homme (2018) : Elliot See
- Jason Bateman (5 films) :
  - L'Ex (2007) : Chip Sanders
  - Couples en vacances (2009) : Jason Smith
  - L'invention du mensonge (2009) : Doctor
  - Jeux de pouvoir (2009) : Dominic Foy
  - Gros Mots (2013) : Guy Trilby
- Tygh Runyan (4 films) :
  - Kitchen Party (film) (1997) : Wayne
  - My Father's Angel (1999) : Enes
  - Aux aguets (2002) : Mike O'Conner
  - Mount Pleasant (2006) : Nick
- Jared Leto (4 films) :
  - Club de Combat (1999) : Angel Face
  - Retour à Brooklyn (2000) : Harry Goldfarb
  - Seigneur de guerre (2005) : Vitaly Orlov
  - Cœurs perdus (2007) : Ray Fernandez
- Lochlyn Munro (4 films) :
  - Film de Peur (2000) : Greg Phillippe
  - Au cœur du rock (2002) : Dave
  - Typiquement masculin (2003) : Ray Donovan
  - De vrais hommes (2004) : Randall
- Joe Manganiello (4 films) :
  - Spider-Man (2002) : Flash Thompson
  - Magic Mike (2012) : Big Dick Richie
  - Sabotage (2014) : Joe "Grinder" Phillips
  - Magic Mike XXL (2015) : Big Dick Richie
- Paddy Considine (4 films) :
  - La Vengeance dans la peau (2007) : Simon Ross
  - Blitz (2011) : Porter Nash
  - Maintenant ou jamais (2012) : le père de Tessa
  - Irremplaçables (2015) : Jago
- Adrian Grenier :
  - Fais-moi craquer (1999) : Chase Hammond
  - Le Diable s'habille en Prada (2006) : Nate
  - Maraudeurs (2016) : Wells
- Ryan Reynolds :
  - Blade III : La Trinité (2004) : Hannibal King
  - Amityville : La Maison du diable (2005) : George Lutz
  - La Proposition (2009) : Andrew Paxton
- Taylor Kitsch :
  - John Carter (2012) : John Carter
  - Bataille Navale (2012) : Alex Hopper
  - Poursuite sous pression (2019) : Ray
- Joseph Gordon-Levitt :
  - Brick : À la recherche d'Emily (2005) : Brendan
  - Killer Heat (2024) : Nick Bali
- Wyatt Russell :
  - Night Swim (2024) : Ray Waller
  - Thunderbolts* (2025) : John Walker
- Nick Stahl :
  - Twist (2003) : Dodge
  - Réveil inattendu (2008) : James
- Paul Rudd :
  - L'Escouade Reno 911 à Miami (2007) : Ethan, le dealer
  - Admission (2013) : John Pressman
- 1999 : La Ligne verte : Percy Wetmore (Doug Hutchinson)
- 2002 : Nicholas Nickleby : Nicholas Nickleby (Charlie Hunnam)
- 2002 : Une soirée parfaite : Kevin (Matt Damon)
- 2002 : Resident Evil : Les Créatures maléfiques : Chad Kaplan (Martin Crewes)
- 2005 : Capote : Truman Capote (Philip Seymour Hoffman)
- 2006 : Le Retour de Superman : Clark Kent / Superman (Brandon Routh)
- 2009 : Brüno : Brüno (Sacha Baron Cohen)
- 2010 : Mon nom est Khan : Rizvan Khan (Shah Rukh Khan)
- 2012 : L'Escadron Red Tails : Andrew "Smokey" Salem (Ne-Yo)
- 2014 : Nouveau Refrain : Dave (Adam Levine)
- 2016 : La Forêt : Aiden (Taylor Kinney)
- 2018 : Carnage chez les Joyeux Touffus : Vinny (Drew Massey)
- 2021 : Tom & Jerry : Ben (Colin Jost)

==== Animation films ====
- 1996 : Le Bossu de Notre-Dame : Quasimodo
- 1998 : Le Roi lion 2 : Kovu
- 1999 : Elmo au pays des grincheux : Grover
- 2000 : Titan après la Terre : Cale Tucker
- 2000 : Le Lion d'Oz : Lion
- 2001 : Shrek : les souris aveugles
- 2001 : Monstres, Inc. : Needleman
- 2002 : La Planète au trésor : Jim Hawkins
- 2002 : Lilo et Stitch : Stitch
- 2002 : Le Bossu de Notre-Dame 2 : Quasimodo
- 2003 : Stitch ! Le film : Stitch
- 2004 : Shrek 2 : les souris aveugles
- 2004 : Gang de requins : Ernie
- 2004 : Les Incroyable : Incroyable Ado et Syndrome
- 2004 : Mickey, il était deux fois Noël : Max Goof
- 2005 : Lilo et Stitch 2 : Stitch
- 2006 : Les Rebelles de la forêt : Elliot
- 2006 : Les Petits Pieds du bonheur : Mumble
- 2006 : Au royaume désenchanté : Rick
- 2007 : Shrek le troisième : les souris aveugles
- 2007 : Les Simpson, le film : Arnold Schwarzenegger
- 2007 : Bienvenue chez les Robinson : Frankie
- 2008 : Les Rebelles de la forêt 2 : Elliot
- 2008 : Kung Fu Panda : Zeng
- 2008 : Star Wars : La Guerre des clones : Anakin Skywalker
- 2009 : Monstres contre Extraterrestres : Gallaxhar
- 2009 : Planète 51 : Glar
- 2010 : Shrek 4 : Il était une fin : les souris aveugles
- 2011 : Les Petits Pieds du bonheur 2 : Mumble
- 2012 : Rebelle : le corbeau
- 2013 : Turbo : Turbo
- 2013 : Épique : Ronin
- 2013 : Les Croods : Guy
- 2014 : Opération Noisettes : Jimmy
- 2015 : Hôtel Transylvanie 2 : Dana
- 2016 : Les Trolls : Branche
- 2017 : L'Étoile de Noël : Bo
- 2017 : Opération noisettes 2 : Jimmy
- 2018 : Les Abominables petits-pieds : Percy
- 2018 : Spider-Man : Dans le Spider Verse : Peter Parker / Spider-Man du même univers que Miles
- 2019 : Le Film Lego 2 : Dave Tronçonneuse / le Purgatoire Dave
- 2020 : Les Croods 2 : Une nouvelle ère : Guy
- 2020 : Les Trolls 2 : Tournée mondiale : Branche
- 2021 : Raya et le Dernier Dragon : Benja
- 2021 : Spirit : L'Indomptable : James "Jim" Prescott
- 2021 : Le Bébé boss : Une affaire de famille : Tim
- 2021 : Encanto : La Fantastique Famille Madrigal : Mariano
- 2022 : Le Chat potté 2 : le dernier vœu : Pinocchio
- 2023 : Les Tortues Ninja : Chaos chez les mutants : Mondo Gecko
- 2023 : Les Trolls 3 : Branche
- 2023 : Il était une fois un studio : Quasimodo
- 2025 : Lilo et Stitch : Stitch

=== Television ===
==== Television films ====
- 2014 : Monsieur Hockey : L'Histoire de Gordie Howe : Bobby Hull (Lochlyn Munro)
- 2015 : Enquêtes gourmandes : Meurtre au menu : Layton (Donavon Stinson)
- 2021 : When Love Blooms : Aaron Blum (Thomas Cadrot)
- 2021 : Christmas CEO : Joe Sullivan (Paul Greene)

==== Television series ====
- Motorheads (2025) : Logan Maddox (Ryan Philippe)
- The Falcon and the Winter Soldier (2021) : John Walker (Wyatt Russell)
- Fitz (2010–2014) : Richard Fitzpatrick (Jason Priestley)
- Blackstone (2015–2016) : Victor Merasty (Nathaniel Arcand)
- Hank Zipzer (2016–2017) : Mr. Love (Nick Mohammed)
- Wind at My Back (2021) : Vanaver Mainwairing (Andrew Jackson) doublage tardif

==== Cartoon series ====
- Sacré Andy ! : Andy Larkin
- Inuk : Kimik
- Nez de Fer, le chevalier mystère : Charmant
- Les Décalés du cosmos : Flip
- La Clique : Cal
- Prezzy : Prezzy
- La Retenue : Chaz Moneranian
- Ruby Gloom : Osso Bécot
- Star Wars: The Clone Wars : Anakin Skywalker
- Wapos Bay : Talon
- 16 Hudson : Monsieur K
- Rick & Steve: The Happiest Gay Couple in All the World : Rick
- Eyeshield 21 : Unsui Kongô
- Supernoobs : Memnok
- Mouvement Deluxe : Keven (original voice)
- MaXi : Jack et Pierre (original voice)
- Monsters at Work : Needleman
- Cochon dingue/Dingue Académie : Arthur le Hérisson, Gervais le Rat, Claude La Tortue (original voice)
- Défis extrêmes : Le Retour à l'île : Dutonnerre
- Les Étoiles des défis extrêmes : Dutonnerre
- Garderie extrême : Dutonnerre
- Dounia : Ay, Mathieu (original voice)
- Dex et les humanimaux : Skung (original voice)
- Barbada : Jérémy, Fred
- L'Agent Jean et Mini-Jean et Mini-Bulle : WXT, Crémeux, Moignons (original voice)
- Les Simpson : Jimbo, Dolph, Lou, Drederick Tatum, Jésus Rainier Wolfcastle...
- L'Île des défis extrêmes 2023 : Bowie

=== Video games ===
- Skylanders: Spyro's Adventure (2011) : Spyro le Dragon
- Assassin's Creed : Revelations (2011) : Soliman le Magnifique
- Skylanders: Giants (2012) : Spyro le Dragon
- Assassin's Creed III (2012) : Gilbert du Motier de La Fayette
- Skylanders: Swap Force (2013) : Spyro le Dragon
- Deceive Inc. (2022) : Larcin

== Narration and announcer work ==
=== Audio books ===
- Votre corps en sait plus que votre cerveau (2020) : Bernard Sensfelder, aux éditions Dangles
- Bernard Landry - L'héritage d'un patriote (2020) : Jean-Yves Duthel, aux éditions Libre Expression
- N'essuie jamais de larmes sans gants (2020) : Jonas Gardell, aux Éditions Alto
- Medical medium (2020) : Anthony William, aux éditions Trédaniel
- Tristan au stade des champions (2020) : Étienne Poirier, aux éditions Héritage / Dominique et compagnie
- Escapades virtuelles (2020) : Jessica Wilcott, aux éditions Foulire
- Collé (2020) : Jean Lacombe, aux éditions Soulières éditeur
- Vaste ciel & Des Eskers de beauté (2021) : Michel X Côté, aux Éditions du Quartz
- Mammouth Rock (2021) : Eveline Payette, à La courte échelle
- Ti-Guy La Puck - Allez, les verts! (2021) : Geneviève Guilbault, aux éditions Andara
- Ti-Guy La Puck - Qui veut la coupe? (2021) : Geneviève Guilbault, aux éditions Andara
- Ti-Guy La Puck - Rendez-vous sur la glace (2021) : Geneviève Guilbault, aux éditions Andara
- Ti-Guy La Puck - La révolte des mascottes (2021) : Geneviève Guilbault, aux éditions Andara
- Le placébo, c'est vous ! Comment donner le pouvoir à votre esprit (2022) : Joe Dispenza, aux éditions Ariane

=== Documentaries and reality television series ===
In most documentary series, Watier is the narrator.

- Pilotes des Glaces (2008)
- Gasland (2010) : Josh Fox
- Dive Detective (2009–2010)
- Mangrove (2011)
- Dating in the Dark (2011)
- Top Ten (2011)
- Eaten Alive (2011)
- Maigrir ou Mourir (2012)
- Fashion Star (2012)
- Swarm Chasers (2012)
- Hélico Tout Terrain (2013)
- Cuff me if you can (2014)
- Méthane (2014)
- Mummies Alive (2015)
- Air Show (2015)
- Hélico tout terrain (2016)
- Dieux du Ciel (2016)
- 1000 jours pour la planète (2016–2017)
- Haute Sécurité (2017)
- Ultimate Pools (2018)
- Rallye Autour du Monde (2002–2018) : Phil Keoghan
- Flip or Flop (2014–2018) : Tarek El Moussa
- Swamp People (2016–2019) : Chase Landry
- World of Dance (2018–2019) : Ne-Yo
- Total Knock Out (2019) : Kevin Hart
- The Block Australia 13 (2019–2020) : Ronnie Caceres
- Repousser la Mort (2019–2020) : Timothy Caulfield
- Expedition Unpacked (2020) : Steve Backshall
- Hoarders (2017–2021) : David Tolin
- Fantômes d'Afghanistan (2021) : Graeme Smith
- MasterChef Australia (2022) : Pete
- Des gens très méchants (2020–2022) : Donnie Wahlberg
- Flipping 101 (2020–2024) : Tarek El Moussa
- The Block: Fans v Faves (2024) : Ronnie Caceres
- La malédiction du condamné (2023–2025)

=== Podcasts ===
- Tatouine (2021) : Annonceur
- L'Agent Jean (2020–2022) : WXT, Moignons, Crémeux
- Someone Knows Something (2022) : David Ridgen

=== In house announcer ===
- La soirée des Jutra (2014–2015)
- Le Gala du cinéma québécois (2016)
- Audioguides du Musée des beaux-arts de Montréal (2016–2025)
- L’orchestre symphonique de Montréal (2014–2025)
