= Playin' Favorites =

Studio album by Don McLean
- Released: October 1973
- Recorded: Summer 1973
- Studio: The Record Plant, New York City; remixed at the Record Plant, Sausalito
- Genre: Bluegrass; folk
- Length: 34:06
- Label: United Artists
- Producer: Ed Freeman

Don McLean chronology
Don McLean (1972)	Playin' Favorites (1973)	Homeless Brother (1974)

Singles from Playin' Favorites
- 1. "Everyday" Released: 23 March 1973; 2. "Mountains O' Mourne" Released: 19 October 1973; 3. "Fool's Paradise" Released: December 1973; 4. "Sitting on Top of the World" Released: 1974

Playin' Favorites is the fourth studio album by American singer-songwriter Don McLean, released in 1973. It was re-issued by BGO Records in 1995.

Professional ratings
Review scores
Source	Rating
Allmusic	link

== Track listing ==
=== Side A ===
1. "Sitting on Top of the World" (Bo Carter, Little Walter) 2:00
2. "Living With the Blues" (Brownie McGhee) 2:20
3. "Mountains O' Mourne" (Percy French) 4:36
4. "Fool's Paradise" (Sonny LeGlaire, Horace Linsley, Norman Petty) 4:10
5. "Love O' Love" (Traditional; adapted and arranged by Don McLean) :50
6. Medley: "Bill Cheetham/Old Joe Clark" (Traditional; adapted and arranged by Don McLean) 3:50

=== Side B ===
1. "Everyday" (Charles Hardin, Norman Petty) "Glen D. Hardin" was incorrectly listed on some labels as the songwriter. 2:30
2. "Ancient History" (Irene Stanton, Wayne Walker) 3:30
3. "Over the Mountains" (Irene Stanton, Wayne Walker) 3:20
4. "Lovesick Blues" (Cliff Friend, Irving Mills) 2:50
5. "New Mule Skinner Blues" (Jimmie Rodgers, George Vaughn) 2:55
6. "Happy Trails" (Dale Evans) 1:15

== Chart positions ==
Chart (1973)	Peak position
Australia (Kent Music Report)	22
United Kingdom (Official Charts Company)	42

== Personnel ==
- Steve Berg – guitar (tracks A1–A2, B4–B5)
- Dave Bromberg – dobro (track B1)
- Buzzy Feiten – tambourine (track A2), guitar (tracks A2, A4)
- John Hughey – pedal steel (track B2)
- Neil Larsen – keyboards (track A4), piano (tracks A3, B1)
- Chuck Leavell – piano (tracks A1–A2, B2, B4–B5)
- Tony Levin – bass (tracks A3–A4, B1–B2)
- Danny Manselino – percussion (track A2)
- Rick Marotta – drums (tracks A1–A2, B2, B4–B5)
- Don McLean – guitar, banjo, vocals
- Frank Orsini – fiddle (tracks A1, B5)
- Rob Rothstein – bass (tracks A1, B4–B5), vocals (tracks A1, B3, B5)
- Johnny Sandlin – percussion (tracks A1, B5)
- Russ Savakus – bass violin (tracks A1–A2, B5)
- Frank Wakefield – mandolin (tracks A1, A6, B4–B6), vocals (tracks A1, B3, B5)
- Ronnie Zito – tambourine (track B1), banjo (track A4)
- Mike Mainieri – marimba (track A4)
- Albertine Robinson – backing vocals (track A2)
- Maretha Stewart – backing vocals (track A2)
- Tasha Thomas – backing vocals (track A2)

Technical

- Ed Freeman – producer
- Frank Hubach – engineer (tracks A2–B3, B6), remixer
- Jim Reeves – engineer (tracks A1, B4–B5)
- Mike Salisbury – art direction
- Fred Conrad – photography
