= Homeless Brother =

Studio album by Don McLean
- Released: October 1974
- Studios: Regent Sound Studios, New York City; Clack Studios
- Genres: Folk; folk rock
- Length: 38:31
- Label: United Artists
- Producer: Joel Dorn

Don McLean chronology
Playin' Favorites (1973)	Homeless Brother (1974)	Solo (1976)

Singles from Homeless Brother
- 1. "Wonderful Baby" Released: June 1975

Homeless Brother is the fifth studio album by American singer-songwriter Don McLean, released in 1974. It was reissued by BGO Records in 1996.

Professional ratings
Review scores
Source	Rating
Allmusic	link
Rolling Stone	(positive) link

== Track listing ==
All tracks composed by Don McLean except where indicated.

Side One

1. "Winter Has Me in Its Grip" 3:19
2. "La La Love You" 3:46
3. "Homeless Brother" 4:22
4. "Sunshine Life for Me (Sail Away Raymond)" (George Harrison) 1:50
5. "The Legend of Andrew McCrew" 6:06

Side Two

1. "Wonderful Baby" 2:04
2. "You Have Lived" 3:42
3. "Great Big Man" 3:16
4. "Tangled (Like a Spider in Her Hair)" 3:39
5. "Crying in the Chapel" (Artie Glenn) 2:20
6. "Did You Know" 4:07

== Chart positions ==
Chart (1974)	Peak position
Australian (Kent Music Report)	65
Billboard 200	120

== Personnel ==
- Don McLean - vocals, acoustic guitar, banjo
- Richard Tee, Arthur Jenkins, Jr. - keyboards
- Hugh McCracken, David Spinozza - guitar
- Willie Weeks, George Duvivier - bass guitar
- Andrew Smith - drums
- Ralph MacDonald, David Carey - percussion
- Willis Jackson - tenor saxophone
- Charlie Fowlkes - baritone saxophone
- Yusef Lateef - flute
- Gerry Teifer - whistling
- William Eaton - arrangements, conductor
- Alfred Brown, Selwart Clarke, Emanuel Vardi, Sanford Allen, Joseph Malignaggi, Avram Weiss, Diana Halprin, Charles Libove, Harry Cykman, Emanuel Green, Harry Lookofsky, Matthew Raimondi, Kermit Moore, Charles McCracken, Max Ellen, Max Pollikoff, Gene Orloff, David Nadien, Kathryn Kienke, Julius Schachter, Harold Kohon, Julius Held, Guy Lumia - strings
- Joe Wilder, Garnett Brown, Wally King, James Buffington, Jonathan Dorn, Billy Slapin, Seldon Powell, George Barrow, Charles Williams, Dany Moore, Peter Gordon, Ray Alonge, George Marge, Brooks Tillotson - horns
- Kenny Vance, The Persuasions, Pete Seeger, Cissy Houston, Renelle Stafford, Ned Albright, Steven Soles, Deidre Tuck, Linda November, Joel Dorn, Helene Miles, Arlene Martell, Marlene VerPlanck, Norma Holes - backing vocals

Technical

- Bob Liftin - recording and remixing engineer
- Joe Ferla - additional recording
- Marcote - cover painting
