= Prime Time (Don McLean album) =

Studio album by Don McLean
- Released: 1977
- Genre: Pop
- Length: 40:01
- Label: Arista
- Producer: John Peters

Don McLean chronology
Solo (1976)	Prime Time (1977)	Chain Lightning (1978)

Prime Time is the sixth studio album by the American singer-songwriter Don McLean, released in 1977. It was produced by John Peters. Drake sampled "The Wrong Thing to Do" in his song "Doing It Wrong" from 2011's Take Care.

== Critical reception ==
Professional ratings
Review scores
Source	Rating
AllMusic	2/5 stars
The Encyclopedia of Popular Music	2/5 stars

Record World called the title track "a rock 'n roll song with a honky-tonk flavor and a good deal of strong and ironic social commentary."

== Track listing ==
All tracks composed by Don McLean, except where indicated.

1. "Prime Time" 5:02
2. "The Statue" 3:19
3. "Jump" 3:38
4. "Red Wing" 1:12
5. "The Wrong Thing to Do" 3:33
6. "The Pattern Is Broken" 2:49
7. "When Love Begins" 3:31
8. "Color TV Blues" 3:58
9. "Building My Body" 3:15
10. "Down the Road/Sally Ann" 1:34
11. "When a Good Thing Goes Bad" 4:00
12. "South of the Border" (Michael Carr, Jimmy Kennedy) 2:21
13. "If You Can Dream" 2:49

== Personnel ==
- Don McLean - guitar, banjo, vocals, electric bass on "When Love Begins"
- Rob Stoner - electric bass, backing vocals
- Howie Wyeth - drums, marimba, piano, harpsichord, backing vocals

with:

- David Sanborn - saxophone on "Jump"
- Dom Cortese - accordion on "South of the Border"
- Kenny Asher - organ, electric piano, clavinet, synthesizer, string arrangements
- Rubens Bassini - percussion
- Christine Faith, Angela Howell, Rona Wyeth - backing vocals on "Jump"
- John Farrell - electric guitar on "Prime Time"
- Ed Freeman - piano on "Building My Body"
- Gene Orloff and His Strings - strings, concertmaster
- Pat Rebillot - piano
