= Don McLean (album) =

Studio album by Don McLean
- Released: November 1972
- Recorded: Fall 1972
- Studio: Record Plant Studios, New York City
- Genre: Folk rock
- Length: 35:45
- Label: United Artists
- Producer: Ed Freeman

Don McLean chronology
American Pie (1971)	Don McLean (1972)	Playin' Favorites (1973)

Don McLean is the third studio album by American singer-songwriter Don McLean, released in 1972, peaking at number 23 on the Billboard 200 chart. It was reissued by BGO Records in 1996. The photo on the cover of the album was taken overlooking the village of Cold Spring, New York.

Record World said of the single "Dreidel" that the "intelligent lyrics sustain interest."

Record World called the single "If We Try" a "ballad beauty."

Professional ratings
Review scores
Source	Rating
Allmusic	link
Christgau's Record Guide	C−

== Track listing ==
All tracks composed by Don McLean, except where indicated.

1. "Dreidel" - 3:45
2. "Bronco Bill's Lament" - 3:36
3. "Oh, My What a Shame" - 3:30
4. "If We Try" - 3:30
5. "The More You Pay (The More It's Worth)" - 2:51
6. "Narcisissima" 3:53
7. "Falling Through Time" - 3:44
8. "On the Amazon" (Vivian Ellis, Clifford Grey, Greatrex Newman) - 3:17
9. "Birthday Song" - 2:34
10. "The Pride Parade" - 4:31

== Chart positions ==
Chart (1972/73)	Peak position
Australian (Kent Music Report)	15
Canada	15
Billboard 200	23

== Personnel ==
- Don McLean - guitar, vocals
- Warren Bernhardt - piano on "Oh My What a Shame"
- Dick Hyman - piano on "On the Amazon"
- Ralph MacDonald - percussion, conga
- Ed Trickett - hammered dulcimer
- Don Brooks - harmonica
- Howard "Buzz" Feiten - guitar
- Neil Larsen - piano
- Tony Levin - bass on "Dreidel" and "Birthday Song"
- Chris Parker - drums
- George Ricci - cello
- Bob Rothstein - bass, vocals
- Russ Savakus - bass, violin, vocals
- Ed Freeman - string arrangements
- West Forty Fourth Street Rhythm and Noise Choir - chorus

Technical

- Tom Flye, Dennis Ferrante, Ed Sprigg, Rod O'Brien - engineer
- John Olson - cover photography

== Releases ==
- CD Don McLean Beat Goes On / BGO Records 2011
