= Chain Lightning (album) =

Studio album by Don McLean
- Released: December 1978
- Recorded: June 26 – August 23, 1978
- Genre: Rock, country
- Length: 37:43
- Label: Millennium
- Producer: Larry Butler

Don McLean chronology
Prime Time (1977)	Chain Lightning (1978)	Believers (1981)

Singles from Chain Lightning
- 1. "Since I Don't Have You" Released: 1978; 2. "Crying" Released: May 1980

Chain Lightning is the seventh studio album by American singer-songwriter Don McLean. It was recorded in Nashville between June and August 1978 and featured many of that city's noted session players as well as backing vocals from the Jordanaires. It was first released in December 1978 in the UK and other markets, but not released for another two years in the US following its delayed success in European markets. The lead single "Crying" became a major hit for McLean, reaching No.1 in the UK Singles Chart in June 1980. The album was subsequently repackaged and released in the US where it also became a success with "Crying" reaching the top five in early 1981. "Since I Don't Have You" was also released as a single, reaching #23.

== Critical reception ==
Professional ratings
Review scores
Source	Rating
AllMusic	2/5 stars
Rolling Stone	2/5 stars

The Boston Globe panned the "awful, sappy version" of "Your Cheatin' Heart".

== Track listing ==
All tracks composed by Don McLean, except where indicated.

1. "Words and Music" - (3:06)
2. "Crying" (Roy Orbison, Joe Melson) - (3:35)
3. "It's Just the Sun" - (2:30)
4. "Lotta Lovin'" (Bernice Bedwell) - (2:07)
5. "Chain Lightning" - (7:48)
6. "Your Cheatin' Heart" (Hank Williams) - (3:04)
7. "Wonderful Night" - (3:01)
8. "It Doesn't Matter Anymore" (Paul Anka) - (3:02)
9. "Since I Don't Have You" (Wally Lester, Joe VerScharen, Janet Vogel, Lenny Martin, Joseph Rock, James Beaumont, Jackie Taylor) - (2:31)
10. "Genesis (In the Beginning)" - (4:48)
11. "It's a Beautiful Life" - (2:11)
12. "If You Could Read My Mind" - (Gordon Lightfoot)

== Charts ==
=== Weekly charts ===
Chart (1978–1981)	Peak position
Australian Albums (Kent Music Report)	41
Canadian Albums (RPM)	25
Canadian Country Albums (RPM)	3
UK Albums (OCC)	19
US Billboard 200	28

=== Year-end charts ===
Chart (1981)	Position
US Billboard 200	100

== Personnel ==
- Don McLean - vocals, acoustic guitar
- James D. Capps, Ray Edenton - acoustic guitar
- Tommy D. Allsup, Billy R. Sanford - electric guitar
- Pete Drake - pedal steel guitar
- Hargus "Pig" Robbins, Chuck Cochran - piano
- Bobby R. Wood - electric piano
- Bob "King" Moore - bass
- Jerry K. Carrigan - drums, percussion
- Joseph E. "Gene" Chrisman, Eddy Anderson - drums
- The Jordanaires - backing vocals
- The Nashville Strings - strings
- Bill Justis - arrangements, conductor

== Sales and certifications ==
Certifications for Chain Lightning
Region	Certification	Certified units/sales
Netherlands (NVPI)	Gold	50,000^{^}
^{^} Shipments figures based on certification alone.
