= American Pie (Don McLean album) =

Studio album by Don McLean
- Released: October 24, 1971
- Recorded: May–June 1971
- Studios: Record Plant, New York City
- Genres: Folk, folk rock
- Length: 36:24; 45:37 (2003 re-issue)
- Labels: United Artists Records UAS-5535 (original); Liberty Records (1980 reissue); Capitol Records (2003 reissue)
- Producer: Ed Freeman

Don McLean chronology
Tapestry (1970)	American Pie (1971)	Don McLean (1972)

Singles from American Pie
- 1. "American Pie" Released: November 1971 (original release); 2. "Vincent" Released: February 1972

American Pie is the second studio album by American singer-songwriter Don McLean, released by United Artists Records on October 24, 1971. The folk rock album reached number one on the Billboard 200, containing the chart-topping singles "American Pie" and "Vincent". Recorded in May and June 1971 at The Record Plant in New York City, the LP is dedicated to Buddy Holly, and was reissued in 1980 minus the track "Sister Fatima". The album was released to much acclaim, later being included in the book 1001 Albums You Must Hear Before You Die.

At the Australian 1972 King of Pop Awards the album won Most Popular Overseas L.P.

== Background ==
American Pie is McLean's second album; his first, Tapestry, having been released to only moderate commercial success and acclaim in 1970. McLean was a protégé of Pete Seeger, having played with him in the 1960s. The album American Pie was intended as a unified work, as McLean has said that he was influenced by the Beatles' Sgt Pepper album and envisioned American Pie to be a similar album. Believing that an artist's work should stand by itself, McLean generally did not offer explanations for his work's themes or meaning, though he did describe the title song as involving "a sense of loss". McLean dedicated the album to Buddy Holly, one of his childhood icons, and it was released in 1971. It has a melancholy feel and rather sparse arrangements. At the time of the writing McLean's first marriage was failing and the optimism and hopefulness of the 1960s was giving way to the nihilism and hedonism of the 1970s.

== Production ==
The album was recorded in Studio A at The Record Plant on West 44th street in New York City. The producer, Ed Freeman, decided to use accomplished musicians who were not "studio musicians who could act like a metronome" because he wanted to capture the feel of a "band that was really cooking," so he rented a rehearsal studio and they rehearsed the title song for two weeks before they recorded it. Because McLean rarely phrased his singing the same way twice there were as many as 24 takes for some of the voice parts, but the rhythm tracks are mostly one take.

The original United Artists Records inner sleeve featured a free verse poem written by McLean about William Boyd, also known as Hopalong Cassidy, along with a picture of Boyd in full Hopalong regalia. The words to this poem appear on a plaque at the hospital where Boyd died. The Boyd poem and picture tribute appear on a special remastered 2003 CD.

The title track contains references to the death of Buddy Holly (McLean being a 13-year-old paper-boy at the time). The phrase "The Day the Music Died" was used by McLean on this song, and has now become an unofficial name for the tragedy.

On the original release, the title of the song "Sister Fatima" is misspelled "Sister Faima"

The final track, "Babylon", is a close paraphrase of the 1st Verse of the 137th Psalm. It is based on the canon "By the Waters of Babylon" by Philip Hayes, originally published in 1786.

== Back-up singers ==
The final chorus of "American Pie" features multi-tracked overdubs, credited in the sleeve notes to the "West Forty Fourth Street Rhythm and Noise Choir". Although the individual choristers have never been publicly named, the album's producer, Ed Freeman, has claimed that the choir included Pete Seeger, James Taylor, Livingston Taylor and Carly Simon.

== Release and reception ==
Professional ratings
Review scores
Source	Rating
AllMusic	4/5 stars
Christgau's Record Guide	C−

The album reached number one within two weeks of release and was certified gold within six months, spending almost a year on the Billboard album charts. Its appeal cut across genres in what was becoming a fragmented music scene.

== Reissue ==
The album was reissued in 1980 without the song "Sister Fatima", and again on June 27, 2003, with the track restored, along with the addition of two bonus tracks. Also the first Spanish issue delivered by Hispavox was released without "Sister Fatima".

== Legacy ==
In February 2003 George Michael recorded a cover of "The Grave" as a protest against the imminent Iraq War. A cover of the song "Babylon" was included in a scene in the television series Mad Men.

"Empty Chairs" was an inspiration for the hit song "Killing Me Softly with His Song".

== Track listing ==
All songs written by Don McLean except where noted.

One Side
No.	Title	Length
1.	"American Pie"	8:33
2.	"Till Tomorrow"	2:11
3.	"Vincent"	3:55
4.	"Crossroads"	3:34

Another Side
No.	Title	Writer(s)	Length
5.	"Winterwood"		3:09
6.	"Empty Chairs"		3:24
7.	"Everybody Loves Me, Baby"		3:37
8.	"Sister Fatima"		2:31
9.	"The Grave"		3:08
10.	"Babylon"	Philip Hayes; arranged by Lee Hays and Don McLean	1:40
Total length:			36:24

2003 Capitol Records Reissue Bonus Tracks
No.	Title	Length
11.	"Mother Nature"	5:10
12.	"Aftermath"	4:03
Total length:		45:37

== Personnel ==
- Don McLean – vocals, acoustic guitar, banjo
- Warren Bernhardt – piano ("Crossroads")
- Ray Colcord – electric piano
- Tom Flye – drums ("The Grave"), engineering
- Ed Freeman – production, string arrangements
- Paul Griffin – piano ("American Pie")
- Lee Hays – arranger
- Mike Mainieri – marimba, vibraphone
- Roy Markowitz – drums, percussion
- Gene Orloff – concertmaster
- Bob Rothstein – bass
- David Spinozza – electric guitar ("American Pie")
- West Forty Fourth Street Rhythm and Noise Choir – chorus

== Charts ==
Chart performance for American Pie
Chart (1971–2022)	Peak position
Australian Albums (Kent Music Report)	1
Canada Top Albums/CDs (RPM)	1
German Albums (Offizielle Top 100)	31
New Zealand Albums (RMNZ)	34
Norwegian Albums (VG-lista)	12
UK Albums (Official Charts)	2
US Billboard 200	1
UK Album Downloads (Official Charts)	25

== Certifications and sales ==
Certifications and sales for American Pie
Region	Certification	Certified units/sales
Canada (Music Canada)	Gold	50,000^{‡}
United Kingdom (BPI)	Gold	100,000^{*}
United States (RIAA)	2× Platinum	2,000,000^{^}
^{*} Sales figures based on certification alone.^{^} Shipments figures based on certification alone.^{‡} Sales+streaming figures based on certification alone.
