= Tapestry (Don McLean album) =

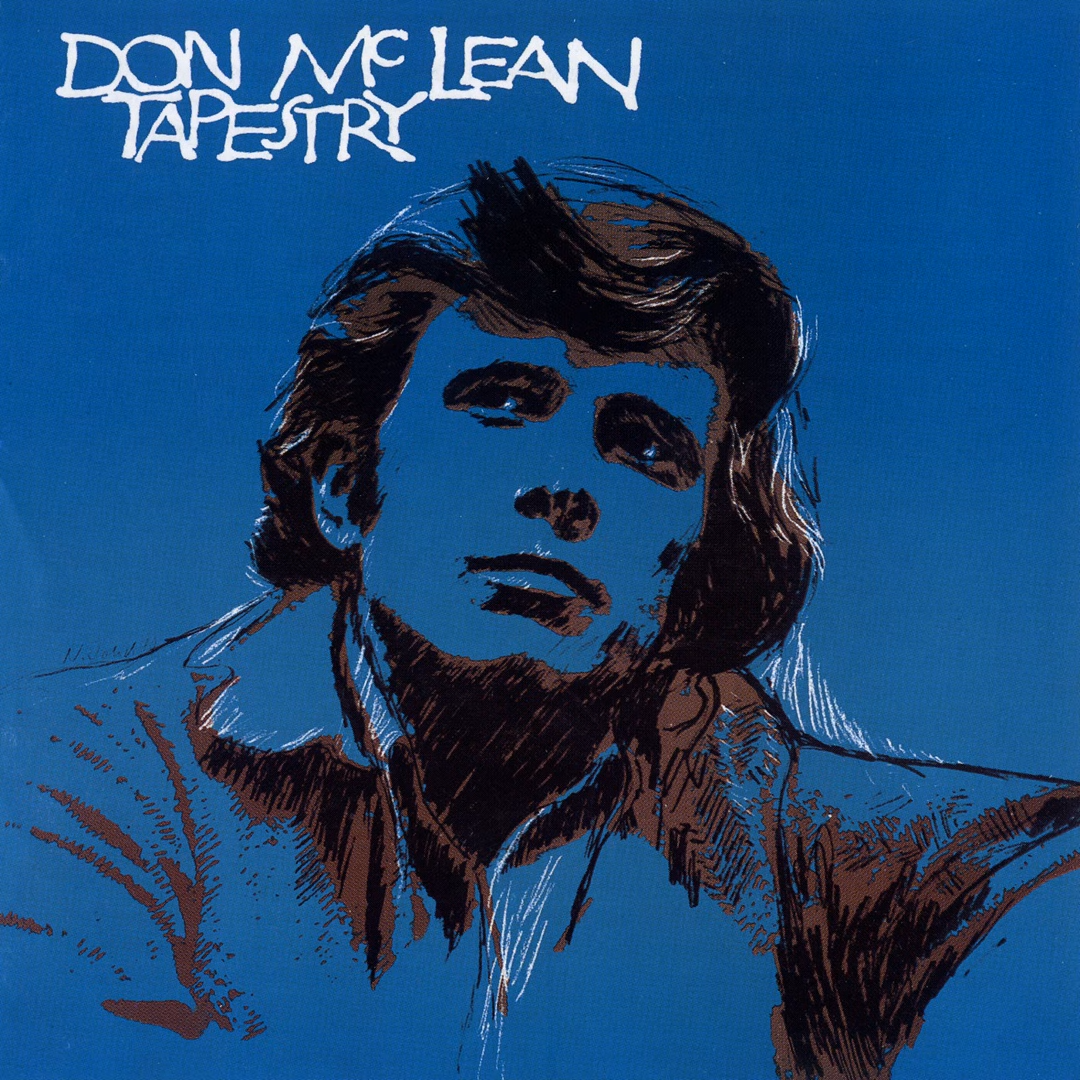

Studio album by Don McLean
- Released: October 1970
- Recorded: 1969–1970
- Studio: Sierra Sound Laboratories, Berkeley, CA
- Genre: Folk
- Length: 40:38
- Label: Mediarts
- Producer: Jerry Corbitt

Don McLean chronology
Tapestry (1970)	American Pie (1971)

Singles from Tapestry
- 1. "Castles in the Air" Released: January 1971; 2. "And I Love You So" Released: 1973

Professional ratings
Review scores
Source	Rating
AllMusic	3/5 stars

Tapestry is the debut studio album by American folk singer Don McLean. The album was originally released in October 1970 by Mediarts Records but was re-issued in 1971 by United Artists after United Artists' purchase of Mediarts. The album was also reissued in 1981 on Liberty Records, but without including the song "Three Flights Up".

The title track "Tapestry" was an inspiration for the formation of the Greenpeace environmental movement. "And I Love You So" is one of McLean's most recorded songs, with versions by artists ranging from Elvis Presley in the 1970s and to Glen Campbell nearly 30 years later. Perry Como had a huge international hit with the song in 1973.

The album was produced by Jerry Corbitt of the Youngbloods. The album was recorded at the Sierra Sound Laboratories, 1741 Alcatraz Ave, Berkeley, California, in 1969–70.

== Track listing ==
All tracks are written by Don McLean.

Side One
No.	Title	Length
1.	"Castles in the Air"	2:50
2.	"General Store"	2:53
3.	"Magdalene Lane"	4:28
4.	"Tapestry"	3:44
5.	"Respectable"	2:29
6.	"Orphans of Wealth"	4:37
Total length:		20:44

Side Two
No.	Title	Length
7.	"Three Flights Up"	5:48
8.	"And I Love You So"	4:16
9.	"Bad Girl"	3:39
10.	"Circus Song"	5:00
11.	"No Reason for Your Dreams"	2:09
Total length:		19:54

== Chart positions ==
Chart (1970)	Peak position
US Billboard 200	111
Chart (1972)	Peak position
Australian (Kent Music Report)	22
United Kingdom (Official Charts Company)	16

== Personnel ==
- Don McLean – vocals, lead guitar, banjo
- Richard Turner – guitar, bass guitar
- Peter Childs – dobro, bass guitar
- Jerry Corbitt – bass guitar
- Gregory Dewey, Jeff Meyer – drums
- Scott Lawrence – piano
- Edward Bogas – piano, string arrangements

Technical

- Bob DeSousa, Roy Ward – engineer
- Ed Freeman, Tom Flye – mixing
- Norber Jobst – cover design
- Julie Snow – photography

== Release history ==
Region	Date	Label	Format	Catalog
United States	1970	Mediarts Records	stereo LP	41-4
