= Wonderful Baby =

1975 song by Don McLean

Single by Don McLean

from the album Homeless Brother
- B-side: "Birthday Song"
- Released: June 1975
- Genre: Pop
- Length: 2:00
- Label: United Artists
- Songwriter: Don McLean
- Producer: Joel Dorn

Don McLean singles chronology
| "If We Try" (1973) | "Wonderful Baby" (1975) | "Crying" (1981) |

"Wonderful Baby" is a song written and originally recorded by Don McLean. It is a track on his album, Homeless Brother, and a tribute to Fred Astaire. The single peaked at number ninety-three on the Billboard Hot 100 and became McLean's second and last number one on the Easy Listening chart. "Wonderful Baby" also reached number one on the Canadian Adult Contemporary chart.

Record World said that "Portraying heaven as a place where soaring cherubs count their digits, McLean performs a top 40 lullabye which should fly higher than any since 'Vincent.'"

== Chart performance ==
| Chart (1975) | Peak position |
|---|---|
| Canada RPM Adult Contemporary | 1 |
| U.S. Billboard Hot 100 | 93 |
| U.S. Billboard Adult Contemporary | 1 |
| U.S. Cash Box Top 100 | 94 |

== Cover versions ==
- Fred Astaire covered the song on his 1975 album Attitude Dancing

== See also ==
- List of Billboard Easy Listening number ones of 1975
