= Castles in the Air (song) =

Single by Don McLean

from the album Believers
- B-side: "Crazy Eyes"
- Released: October 1981
- Genre: Easy listening
- Length: 3:40
- Label: Millennium
- Songwriter: Don McLean
- Producer: Larry Butler

Don McLean singles chronology
"Since I Don't Have You" (1981)	"Castles in the Air" (1981)	"He's Got You" (1987)

"Castles in the Air" is a song by American singer-songwriter Don McLean, which he originally released as his debut single in 1971 and subsequently re-recorded and re-released a decade later. The song describes a man who is unsatisfied with and weary of an urban lifestyle. Although native to the city, he decides to forsake not only his urban 'castle in the air' but also his love interest there. Because of his desire for and love of a country life, he decides to seek romance with a like-minded woman.

== History ==
Originally recorded in 1970, "Castles in the Air" was McLean's first American single release, preceding "American Pie". The original version of "Castles in the Air" was included on the Tapestry album. In January 1971, it was released as the first single from the album and reached No. 40 on the Billboard Easy Listening chart. After the success of the "American Pie" single, "Castles in the Air" was included as the B-side to its follow-up, "Vincent", and received enough radio airplay to reach the Hot 100 chart as a "flip".

In 1981, McLean re-recorded and re-released "Castles in the Air". The new version of the song, a slower ballad version compared with the more mid to uptempo version of the original, first appeared on his album Believers, and later replaced the original version on some copies of Tapestry. Billboard praised the "soft guitar backdrop and tender vocal." Record World said that "this gentle, rolling ballad has a timeless sound." The new rendition was more successful, becoming a Top 40 hit in the US (No. 36 Billboard and No. 31 Cash Box), and reaching No. 11 in Australia. It was also a top 10 hit on the Adult Contemporary charts of both the US (No. 7) and Canada (No. 2). "Castles in the Air" became McLean's final pop hit before his genre shift to country music in the mid-1980s.

== Chart performance ==
=== Weekly charts ===
Chart (1971)	Peak position
US Billboard Easy Listening	40

Chart (1981–82)	Peak position
Australia (Kent Music Report)	11
Canada Adult Contemporary	2
New Zealand	12
UK Singles Chart	47
US Billboard Hot 100	36
US Billboard Adult Contemporary	7
US Cash Box Top 100	31

=== Year-end charts ===
Chart (1982)	Rank
Australia (Kent Music Report)	85
