= American Boys =

Studio album by Don McLean
- Released: May 17, 2024
- Studios: Sunny's Lab, Nashville, Tennessee
- Length: 51:59
- Label: Self-released
- Producer: Michael Severs

Don McLean chronology
Still Playin' Favorites (2020)	American Boys (2024)

Singles from American Boys
- 1. "American Boys" Released: March 1, 2024; 2. "The Gypsy Road" Released: April 12, 2024

American Boys is the twenty-second studio album by the American musician Don McLean, self-released on May 17, 2024.

== Background ==
Don McLean has stated there are many inspirations for the album which include but are not limited to Chuck Berry, Buddy Holly, Fats Domino, Johnny Cash and Elvis Presley. As McLean told Music TImes: "It's an inspiration to see Mick Jagger running around at 80 years old. He refuses to pay any heed to anything. He's just going to do what he wants to do. I love that about him.

== Composition and lyrics ==
The first track, which is also the title track, is reportedly about "the boys who invented rock and roll". The album's ninth track, "The Ballad of George Floyd", centers around the murder of George Floyd, a man who was murdered by police on May 25, 2020, as McLean wrote "And months later, when Tyre Nichols was murdered—a young, beautiful black boy, 29 years old—by five black police officers, that theory went out the window. This is about bad actors in power, and it can happen to any American. It’s an American tragedy, and that’s why I wrote it.".

== Critical reception ==
Professional ratings
Review scores
Source	Rating
Spill Magazine	3.5/5 stars

The writers of Spill Magazine stated that "the album is almost as varied as it is long. While it does not adhere to genre description, it is essentially a retro rock RnB country project. Or is it? There are plenty of musical nods to works of the past, but McLean also takes some interesting detours", they note that "there are some outstanding tracks on American Boys, including the album’s latest single, “The Gypsy Road”, and the reggae and gospel-tinged “I Shall Find My Way”. With its memorable chorus and strong message, the latter song is classic McLean", they conclude that "Long-time fans will want to know what Don McLean has been up to. Still, despite some high points, this album is a trifle uneven."

== Track listing ==
All tracks are written by Don McLean, except "I Shall FInd My Way", written by McLean and Vip Vipperman.

No.	Title	Length
1.	"American Boys" (featuring Home Free)	3:45
2.	"Thunderstorm Girl"	2:47
3.	"Stone Cold Gangster"	3:15
4.	"Truth and Fame"	3:59
5.	"The Gypsy Road"	3:58
6.	"I Shall Find My Way"	3:46
7.	"Mexicali Girl"	2:53
8.	"Vacant Luxury"	4:13
9.	"The Ballad of George Floyd"	3:07
10.	"The Meanest Girl"	4:33
11.	"Marley's Song (Save Yourself)"	5:28
12.	"Resurrection Man"	3:05
13.	"Gotta Make You MIne" (bonus track)	3:58
Total length:		51:59

== Personnel ==
According to the liner notes:

- Don McLean – vocals and acoustic guitar
- Michael Severs – acoustic and electric guitars
- Dennis Wage – piano and Hammond B3 organ
- Tony Migliore – piano and string arrangements
- Jerry Kroone – drums
- Alison Prestwood – bass
- Vip Vipperman – electric and slide guitar
- Kerry Marx – electric guitar
- Home Free – backing vocals
