= Don McLean =

American singer-songwriter (born 1945)

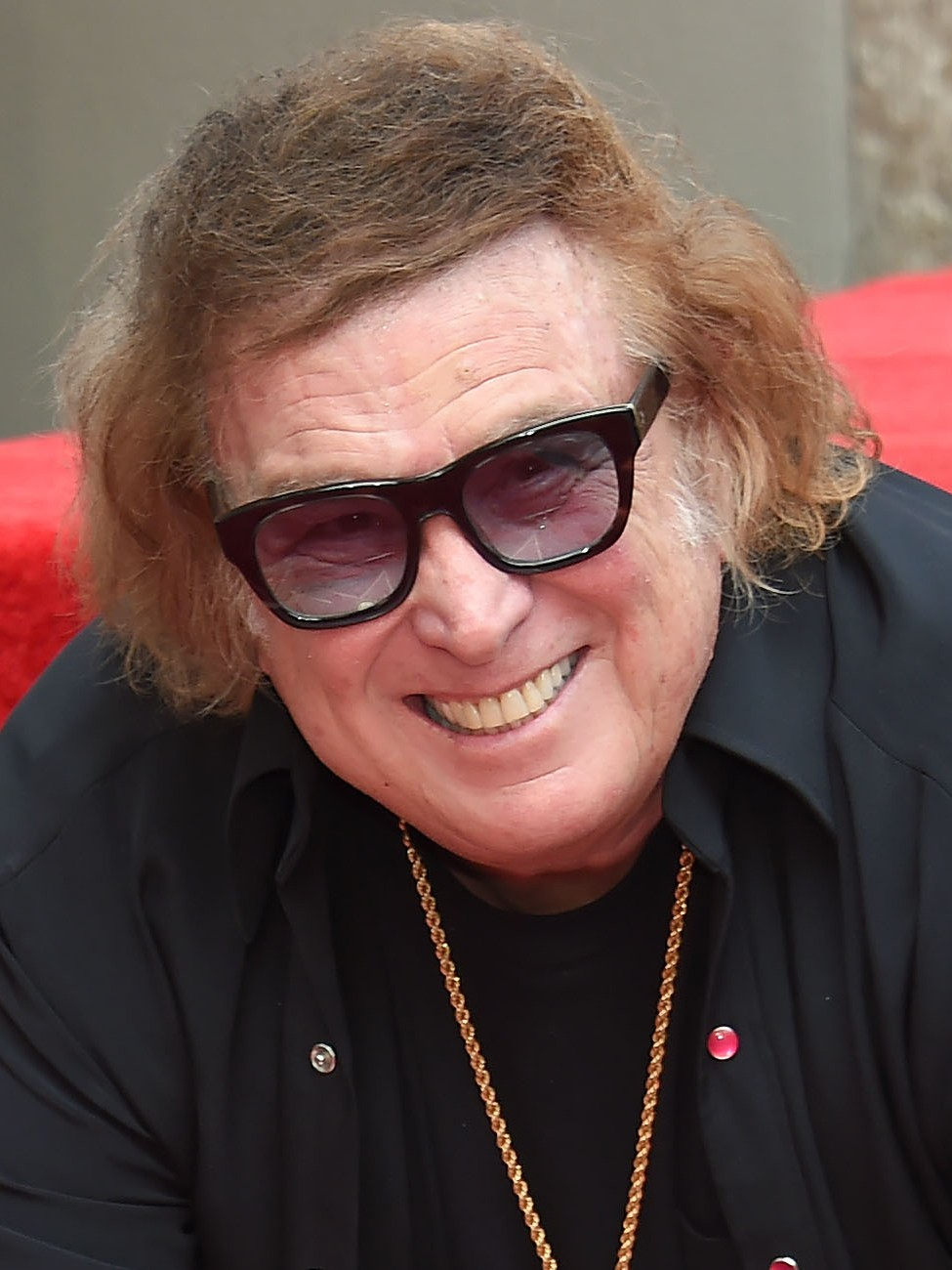
- McLean in 2021

Background information
- Born: Donald McLean III; October 2, 1945 (age 81); New Rochelle, New York, U.S.
- Genres: Folk; rock; folk rock; country
- Occupation: Singer-songwriter
- Instruments: Vocals; guitar
- Years active: 1964–present
- Labels: United Artists; EMI; Curb; Capitol
- Spouses: Carol Sauvion (m. 1969; div. 1972) Patrisha Shnier McLean (m. 1987; div. 2016)
- Website: don-mclean.com

Donald McLean III (/məˈkleɪn/; born October 2, 1945) is an American singer-songwriter and guitarist. Known as the "American Troubadour" or "King of the Trail", he is best known for his 1971 hit "American Pie", an eight-and-a-half-minute folk rock song that has been referred to as a "cultural touchstone". His other hit singles include "Vincent", "Dreidel", "Castles in the Air", and "Wonderful Baby", as well as renditions of Roy Orbison's "Crying" and the Skyliners' "Since I Don't Have You".

McLean's song "And I Love You So" has been recorded by Elvis Presley, Perry Como, Helen Reddy, Glen Campbell, and others. In 2000, Madonna had a hit with a rendition of "American Pie". In 2004, McLean was inducted into the Songwriters Hall of Fame. In January 2018, BMI certified that "American Pie" had reached five million airplays and "Vincent" three million. Though most of McLean's music is in the folk rock genre, he has experimented with easy listening, country, and other genres as well.

== Early life ==
McLean's grandfather and father, both also named Donald McLean, were of Scottish origin. McLean's mother, Elizabeth Bucci, was of Italian origin; her parents originated from Abruzzo in central Italy. McLean grew up in New Rochelle, New York, where he delivered newspapers as a boy.

=== Musical roots ===
Though some of his early musical influences included Frank Sinatra and Buddy Holly, as a teenager McLean became interested in folk music, particularly the Weavers' 1955 recording The Weavers at Carnegie Hall. He often missed long periods of school because of childhood asthma and although he slipped in his studies his love of music was allowed to flourish. By age 16 he had bought his first guitar and begun making contacts in the music business, becoming friends with the folk singers Erik Darling and Fred Hellerman of the Weavers. Hellerman said, "He called me one day and said, 'I'd like to come and visit you', and that's what he did! We became good friends – he has the most remarkable music memory of anyone I've ever known."

When McLean was 15 his father died. Fulfilling his father's request, McLean graduated from Iona Preparatory School in 1963, and briefly attended Villanova University, dropping out after four months. After leaving Villanova McLean became associated with folk music agent Harold Leventhal for several months before teaming up with his personal manager, Herb Gart. For the next six years he performed at venues and events including The Bitter End and the Gaslight Cafe in New York, the Newport Folk Festival, the Cellar Door in Washington, D.C., and the Troubadour in Los Angeles. Gart's 18-year tenure as McLean's manager ended acrimoniously in the 1980s. Following Gart's death in September 2018, McLean wrote:

I feel it is important to note that Herb did many good things for me in the beginning but could not deal with my success, as odd as that may sound.

In about 1982 Herb told me his associate Walter Hofer who ran Copyright Service Bureau (a collection business for song publishers) had stolen $90,000 from my account but had "put it back". This was a cover story and a lie. Furthermore the amount turned out to be more like $200,000 and because Gart was now complicit in this crime I fired him. He sued me but settled for a small amount and was never heard from again. There is so much of this in my business and artists usually sweep it under the rug but I don't.

I want people to know the truth about my journey.

McLean attended night school at Iona College and received a bachelor's degree in business administration in 1968. He turned down a scholarship to Columbia University Graduate School in favor of pursuing a career as a singer-songwriter, performing at such venues as Caffè Lena in Saratoga Springs, New York, and The Main Point in Bryn Mawr, Pennsylvania.

Later that year, with the help of a grant from the New York State Council on the Arts, McLean began reaching a wider audience, with visits to towns up and down the Hudson River. He learned the art of performing from his friend and mentor Pete Seeger. McLean accompanied Seeger on his Clearwater boat trip up the Hudson River in 1969 to raise awareness of environmental pollution in the river. During this time McLean wrote songs that appeared on his first album Tapestry. McLean co-edited the book Songs and Sketches of the First Clearwater Crew, with sketches by Thomas B. Allen, for which Seeger wrote the foreword. Seeger and McLean sang "Shenandoah" on the 1974 Clearwater album. McLean thought very highly of Seeger and spoke fondly of his experiences working with him: "Hardly a day goes by when I don't think of Pete and how generous and supportive he was. If you could understand his politics and you got to know him, he really was some kind of modern-day saint."

== Recording career ==
=== Early breakthrough ===
McLean recorded Tapestry in 1969 in Berkeley, California, during the student riots. After being rejected 72 times by labels, the album was released by Mediarts, a label that had not existed when he first started to look for one. He worked on the album for a couple of years before putting it out. It attracted good reviews but little notice outside the folk community, though on the Easy Listening chart "Castles in the Air" was a success, and in 1973 "And I Love You So" became a number 1 Adult Contemporary hit for Perry Como.

McLean's major break came when Mediarts was taken over by United Artists Records, thus securing the promotion of a major label for his second album, American Pie. The album launched two number one hits in the title song and "Vincent". American Pie's success made McLean an international star and piqued interest in his first album, which charted more than two years after its initial release.

=== "American Pie" ===
McLean's "American Pie" is a song inspired partly by the deaths of Buddy Holly, Ritchie Valens and J.P. Richardson (The Big Bopper) in a plane crash in 1959, and developments in American youth culture in the subsequent decade. The song popularized the expression "The Day the Music Died" in reference to the crash.

The song was recorded on May 26, 1971, and a month later received its first radio airplay on New York's WNEW-FM and WPLJ-FM to mark the closing of Fillmore East, the famous New York concert hall. "American Pie" reached number one on the Billboard Hot 100 from January 15 to February 5, 1972, and remains McLean's most successful single release, being certified six-times Platinum by RIAA. The single also topped the Billboard Easy Listening chart. With a total running time of 8:36 encompassing both sides of the single, it was also the longest song to reach number one until Taylor Swift's 10-minute version of "All Too Well" broke that record in 2021. Some stations played only part one of the original split-sided single release.

WCFL DJ Bob Dearborn unraveled the lyrics and first published his interpretation on January 7, 1972, four days after the song reached number 1 on rival station WLS, six days before it reached number 1 on WCFL, and eight days before it reached number 1 nationally (see "Further reading" under "American Pie"). Numerous other interpretations, which together largely converged on Dearborn's interpretation, quickly followed. McLean declined to say anything definitive about the lyrics until 1978. Since then McLean has stated that the lyrics are also somewhat autobiographical and present an abstract story of his life from the mid-1950s until the time he wrote the song in the late 1960s.

Once when asked what the song meant, McLean joked that "it means I don't ever have to work again if I don't want to."

The original United Artists Records inner sleeve featured a free verse poem written by McLean about William Boyd, also known as Hopalong Cassidy, along with a picture of Boyd in full Hopalong regalia. This sleeve was removed within a year of the album's release. The words to this poem appear on a plaque at the hospital where Boyd died. The Boyd poem and picture tribute do appear on a special remastered 2003 CD.

In 2001, "American Pie" was voted number 5 in a poll of the 365 Songs of the Century compiled by the Recording Industry Association of America (RIAA) and the National Endowment for the Arts.

On April 7, 2015, McLean's original working manuscript for "American Pie" sold for $1,205,000 (£809,524/€1,109,182) at Christie's auction rooms in New York City, making it the third highest auction price achieved for an American literary manuscript.

In the sale catalogue notes, McLean explained the meaning in the song's lyrics: "Basically in 'American Pie' things are heading in the wrong direction. ... It [life] is becoming less idyllic. I don't know whether you consider that wrong or right but it is a morality song in a sense." The catalogue confirmed some of the better-known references in the song's lyrics, including mentions of Elvis Presley ("the king") and Bob Dylan ("the jester"), and confirmed that the song culminates with a description of the killing of Meredith Hunter at the Altamont Free Concert, ten years after the plane crash that killed Holly, Valens and Richardson, and that the song broadly depicts how the early rock innocence of the 1950s, and a bygone simpler age, had been lost; overtaken by events and changes, which themselves had been overtaken by further changes. However, in the 2022 documentary The Day the Music Died: The Story of Don McLean's American Pie, McLean gave a different account, claiming that Presley was not the king referenced in the song, and Dylan was not the jester, although he is open to other interpretations.

Mike Mills of R.E.M. reflected on the song, that "'American Pie' just made perfect sense to me as a song and that's what impressed me the most. I could say to people this is how to write songs. When you've written at least three songs that can be considered classic that is a very high batting average and if one of those songs happens to be something that a great many people think is one of the greatest songs ever written you've not only hit the top of the mountain but you've stayed high on the mountain for a long time."

When asked about his record being broken by Taylor Swift in a Billboard interview, Don McLean said, "there is something to be said for a great song that has staying power. 'American Pie' remained on top for 50 years and now Taylor Swift has unseated such a historic piece of artistry. Let's face it, nobody ever wants to lose that No. 1 spot, but if I had to lose it to somebody, I sure am glad it was another great singer/songwriter such as Taylor." When Swift broke McLean's record, she sent him flowers and a handwritten note that read "I will never forget that I'm standing on the shoulders of giants".

=== "Vincent" ===
"Vincent" is a tribute to the 19th-century Dutch painter Vincent van Gogh. The inspiration came to McLean one morning while looking at a book about Van Gogh. As he studied a print of Van Gogh's painting The Starry Night, he realized that a song could be written about the artist through the painting. The song argues that Van Gogh had a psychiatric illness, as opposed to being insane. It reached number 12 on the Billboard Hot 100 and it proved to be a huge hit worldwide, including reaching number 1 in the UK Singles Chart. Mike Mills of R.E.M. said "You can't change a note in that song". The song was performed by NOFX on their album 45 or 46 Songs That Weren't Good Enough to Go on Our Other Records and appears on the Fat Wreck Chords compilation Survival of the Fattest. "Vincent" was sung by Josh Groban on his 2001 debut album. In 2018, singer-songwriter Ellie Goulding recorded a new, stripped back, acoustic guitar-driven version of the song.

=== Subsequent recordings ===
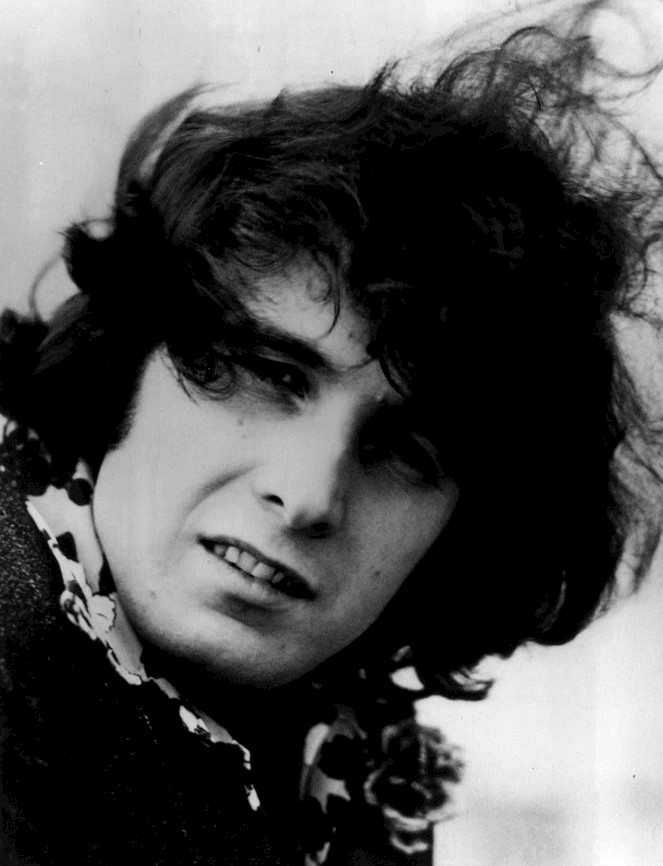
McLean in a publicity photo, 1976

Personnel from the American Pie album sessions were retained for his third album Don McLean, including the producer, Ed Freeman, Rob Rothstein on bass, and Warren Bernhardt on piano. The song "The Pride Parade" provides an insight into McLean's immediate reaction to stardom. McLean told Melody Maker in 1973 that Tapestry was an album by someone previously concerned with external situations. American Pie combines externals with internals, and the resultant success of that album makes the third one (Don McLean) entirely introspective."

Other songs written by McLean for the album include "Dreidel" (number 21 on the Billboard chart) and "If We Try" (number 58), which was recorded by Olivia Newton-John. "On the Amazon" from the 1920s musical Mr. Cinders was an unusual choice but became an audience favorite in concerts and featured in Till Tomorrow, a documentary film about McLean produced by Bob Elfstrom (Elfstrom held the role of Jesus Christ in Johnny and June Cash's Gospel Road). The film shows McLean in concert at Columbia University as he was interrupted by a bomb scare. He left the stage while the audience stood up and checked under their seats for anything that resembled a bomb. After the all-clear, McLean re-appeared and sang "On the Amazon" from exactly where he had left off. Don Heckman reported the bomb scare in his review for The New York Times titled "Don McLean Survives Two Obstacles".

The fourth album Playin' Favorites was a top-40 hit in the UK in 1973 and included the Irish folk classic, "Mountains of Mourne" and Buddy Holly's "Everyday", a live rendition of which returned McLean to the UK Singles Chart. McLean said "The last album (Don McLean) was a study in depression whereas the new one (Playin' Favorites) is almost the quintessence of optimism."

The 1974 album Homeless Brother, produced by Joel Dorn, was McLean's final studio recording for United Artists. The album featured fine New York session musicians, including Ralph McDonald on percussion, Hugh McCracken on guitar and a guest appearance by Yusef Lateef on flute. The Persuasions sang the background vocals on "Crying in the Chapel", and Cissy Houston provided a backing vocal on "La La Love You". The album's title song was inspired by Jack Kerouac's book Lonesome Traveler, in which Kerouac tells the story of America's "homeless brothers" or hobos. The song features background vocals by Pete Seeger.

The song "The Legend of Andrew McCrew" was based on an article published in The New York Times concerning a black Dallas hobo named Anderson McCrew who was killed when he leapt from a moving train. No one claimed him, so a carnival took his body, mummified it, and toured all over the South with him, calling him "The Famous Mummy Man". McLean's song inspired radio station WGN in Chicago to tell the story and give the song airplay in order to raise money for a headstone for McCrew's grave. Their campaign was successful, and McCrew's body was exhumed and buried in the Lincoln Cemetery in Dallas.

Joel Dorn later collaborated on the McLean career retrospective Rearview Mirror, released in 2005 on Dorn's label, Hyena Records. In 2006, Dorn reflected on working with McLean:

Of the more than 200 studio albums I've produced in the past 40 plus years, there is a handful; maybe 15 or so that I can actually listen to from top to bottom. Homeless Brother is one of them. It accomplished everything I set out to do. And it did so because it was a true collaboration. Don brought so much to the project that all I really had to do was capture what he did, and complement it properly when necessary.

In 1977 a brief liaison with Arista Records that yielded the album Prime Time, and in October 1978, the single "It Doesn't Matter Anymore". This was a track from the album Chain Lightning that should have been the second of four with Arista. McLean had started recording in Nashville, Tennessee, with Elvis Presley's backing singers, the Jordanaires, and many of Presley's musicians. However the Arista deal broke down following artistic disagreements between McLean and the Arista chief, Clive Davis. Consequently, McLean was left without a record contract in the United States, but through continuing deals, Chain Lightning was released by EMI in Europe and by Festival Records in Australia.

In April 1980, the Roy Orbison song "Crying" from the album began picking up airplay on Dutch radio stations and McLean was called to Europe to appear on several important musical variety shows to promote the song and support its release as a single by EMI. The song achieved number 1 status in the Netherlands first, followed by the UK and then Australia.

McLean's number 1 successes in Europe and Australia led to a new deal in the United States with Millennium Records, which issued Chain Lightning two and a half years after it had been recorded in Nashville and two years after its release in Europe. It charted on February 14, 1981, and reached number 28, and "Crying" climbed to number 5 on the pop singles chart. Orbison himself thought that McLean's version was the best interpretation he'd ever heard of one of his songs. Orbison thought McLean did a better job than he did and even went so far as to say that McLean's voice was one of the great instruments of 20th-century America. According to Brian Wilson of the Beach Boys, "McLean's voice could cut through steel – he is a very pure singer and he's up there with the best of them. He's a very talented singer and songwriter and he deserves his success."

McLean had further chart successes in the United States in the early 1980s with "Since I Don't Have You", a new recording of "Castles in the Air" and "It's Just the Sun". In 1987, the release of the country-based album Love Tracks gave rise to the hit singles "Love in My Heart" (a top-10 in Australia), "You Can't Blame the Train" (U.S. country number 49), and "Eventually". The latter two songs were written by Terri Sharp. In 1991, EMI reissued "American Pie" as a single in the United Kingdom, and McLean performed on Top of the Pops. In 1992, previously unreleased songs became available on Favorites and Rarities, and Don McLean Classics featured new studio recordings of "Vincent" and "American Pie".

McLean has continued to record new material, including River of Love in 1995 on Curb Records, and more recently, the albums You've Got to Share, Don McLean Sings Marty Robbins and The Western Album for his own Don McLean Music label. Addicted to Black was released in May 2009.

=== Other songs ===
McLean's other well-known songs include the following.

- "And I Love You So" featured on McLean's first album Tapestry first released in 1970. The song was later recorded by Elvis Presley, Helen Reddy, Shirley Bassey, Glen Campbell, Engelbert Humperdinck, Howard Keel, Claude François, and a 1973 hit for Perry Como. The song was performed at the Royal Wedding reception of Prince Harry and Meghan Markle in 2018.
- "Castles in the Air", which McLean recorded twice. His 1981 re-recording was a top-40 hit, reaching number 36 on the Billboard Hot 100 in late 1981.
- "Wonderful Baby", a tribute to Fred Astaire that Astaire himself recorded. Primarily rejected by pop stations, it reached number 1 on the Billboard Easy Listening chart.

The American Pie album features a version of Psalm 137, titled "Babylon". The song is based on a canon by Philip Hayes and was arranged by McLean and Lee Hays of the Weavers. "Babylon" was performed in the Mad Men episode of the same name despite the fact that the song would not be released until 10 years after the time in which the episode is set.

In 1981, McLean had an international number one hit with a version of the Roy Orbison classic "Crying". It was only after the record became a success overseas that it was released in the United States. The single hit reached number 5 on the Billboard Hot 100 in 1981. Orbison himself once described McLean as "the voice of the century", and in a subsequent re-recording of the song, Orbison incorporated elements of McLean's version.

For the 1982 animated movie The Flight of Dragons, produced by Jules Bass and Arthur Rankin, Jr., McLean sang the opening theme. However, no soundtrack has ever been released.

=== Later career ===
The Don McLean Story: Killing Us Softly With His Songs was published in 2007. Biographer Alan Howard conducted extensive interviews for this, the only book-length biography of the often reclusive McLean to date.

McLean attended the opening dinner service of Hell's Kitchen's eighteenth season as one of the red diners who had their food cooked by the rookies.

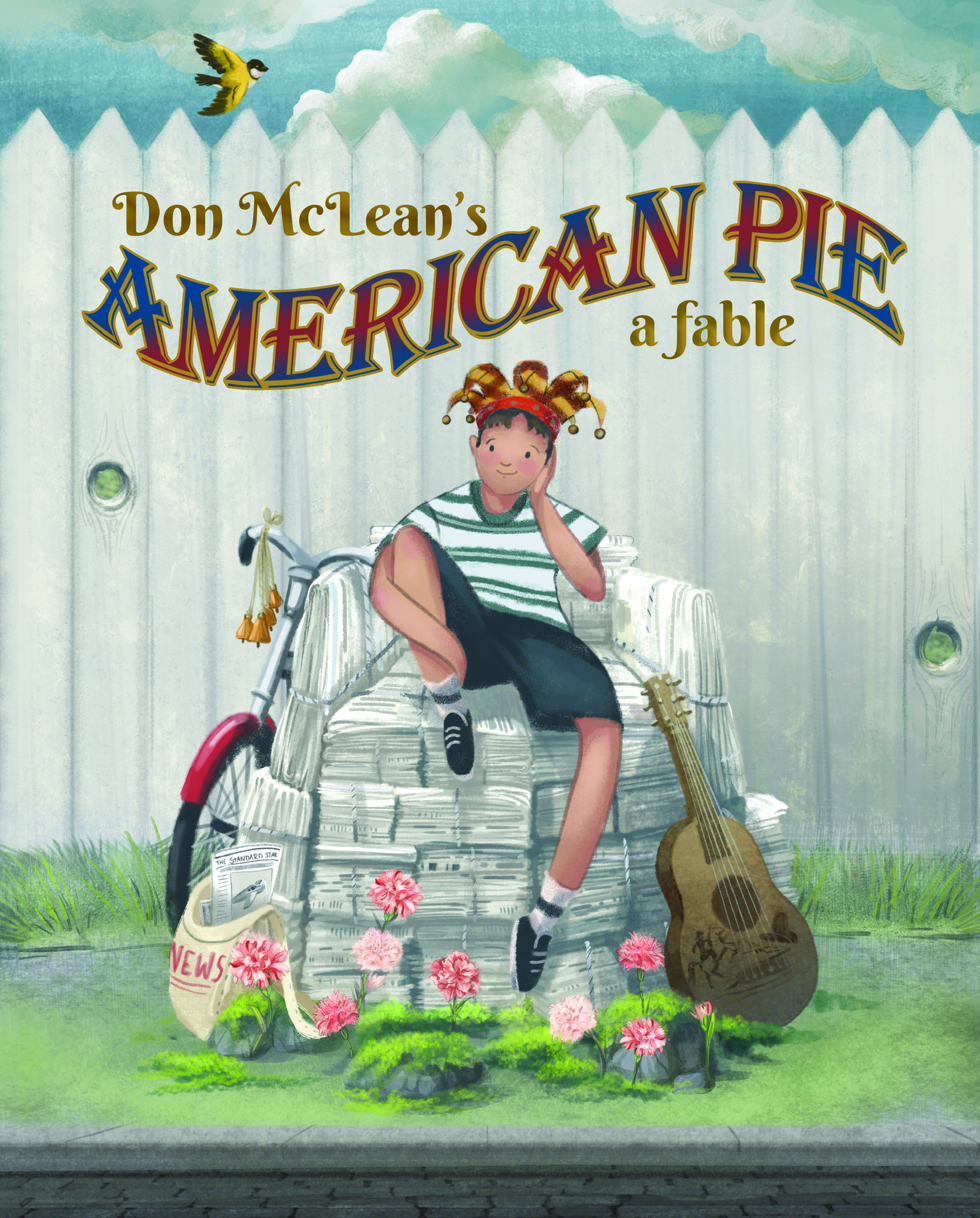
McLean co-wrote children's book American Pie: A Fable, which was inspired by his 1971 song.

McLean is credited as a co-writer on Drake's song "Doing It Wrong", featuring Stevie Wonder. The song includes lyrics from two McLean compositions – "The Wrong Thing to Do" and "When a Good Thing Goes Bad" – both of which were featured on his 1977 album Prime Time.

In a July 2022 documentary, titled The Day The Music Died, McLean discussed for the first time in 50 years the meaning of the lyrics in "American Pie".

In February 2022, McLean recorded a performance of "Vincent" at the Immersive Van Gogh exhibit in Los Angeles in honor of Van Gogh's birthday and the 50th anniversary of the song.

In April 2022, Tyson Fury teamed up with McLean to remake "American Pie". McLean won six Telly Awards for the Fury-Whyte fight opening.

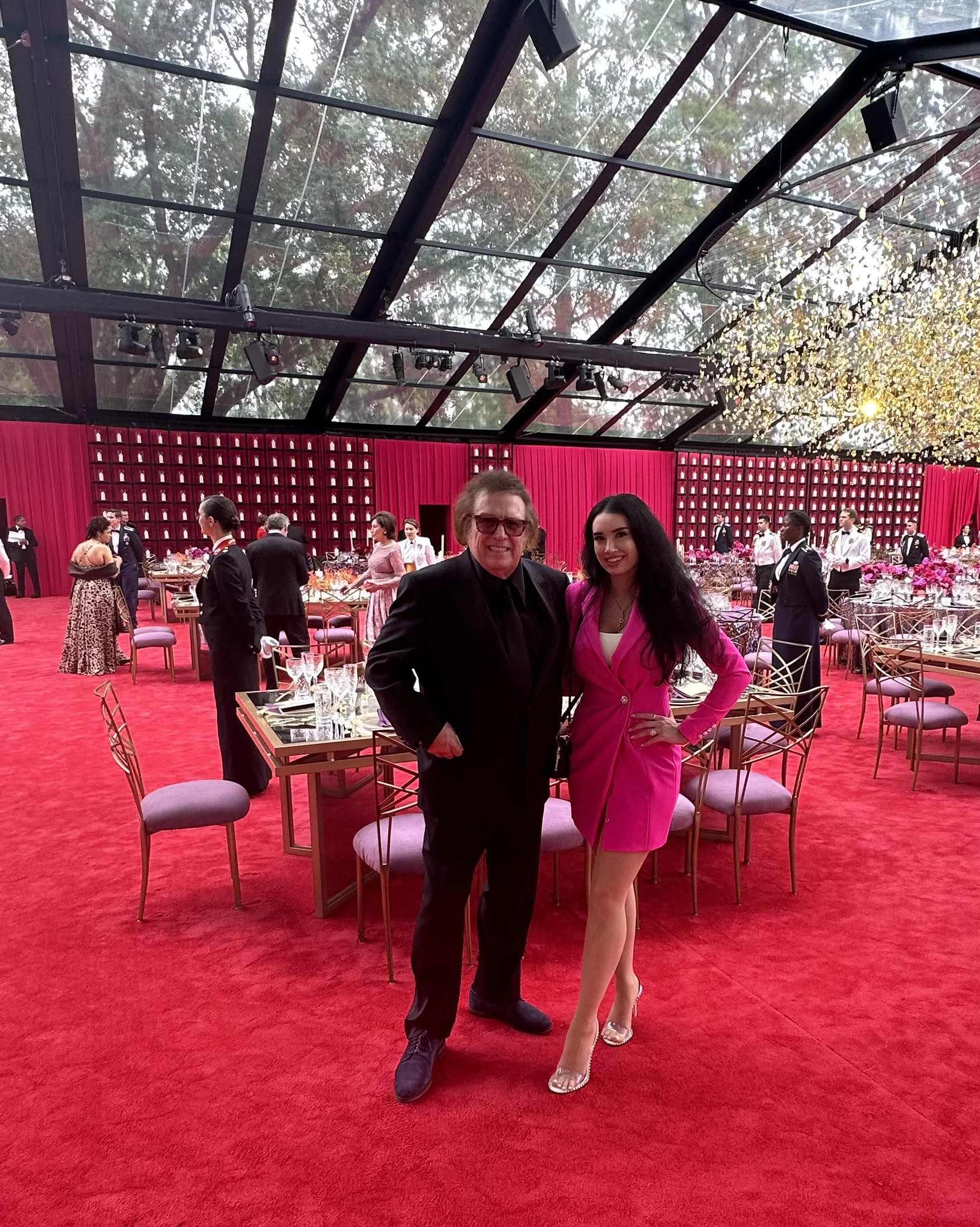
Don McLean and Paris Dylan attending state dinner at the White House

In June 2022, McLean published a children's book titled American Pie: A Fable. The story follows the emotional journey of a newspaper delivery boy in the late 1950s who discovers the joy of friendship and music, eventually learning that when you recognize what truly makes you happy, you are never really alone.

McLean led a wave of dropouts from the National Rifle Association of America (NRA) convention after the mass shooting in Uvalde, Texas, saying it would be "disrespectful and hurtful" to perform days after 19 children and two adults were killed in a mass shooting in the state. McLean was first among performers who announced they would no longer perform at the National Rifle Association's annual meeting in Houston.

In October 2022, McLean called rapper Kanye West an "attention-seeking fool" over his antisemitic rants. McLean, who briefly lived in Israel, said he stood with his Jewish friends. "Lately, a flood of antisemitic invective has been triggered by the ranting of a stupid attention-seeking fool we all know", McLean wrote in the statement that did not mention West by name. "I want to say I stand with my Jewish friends and I stand with the state of Israel. When this kind of thing happens, we should realize why the state of Israel must be respected and protected." McLean lived in Israel on-and-off from 1978 to 1982, and he "grew to love the country and the people. Living there changed [his] life forever."

In May 2025, McLean delivered an address to the Oxford Union, the University of Oxford’s historic debating society, reflecting on five decades in music and the cultural after-life of American Pie.

== Concerts ==
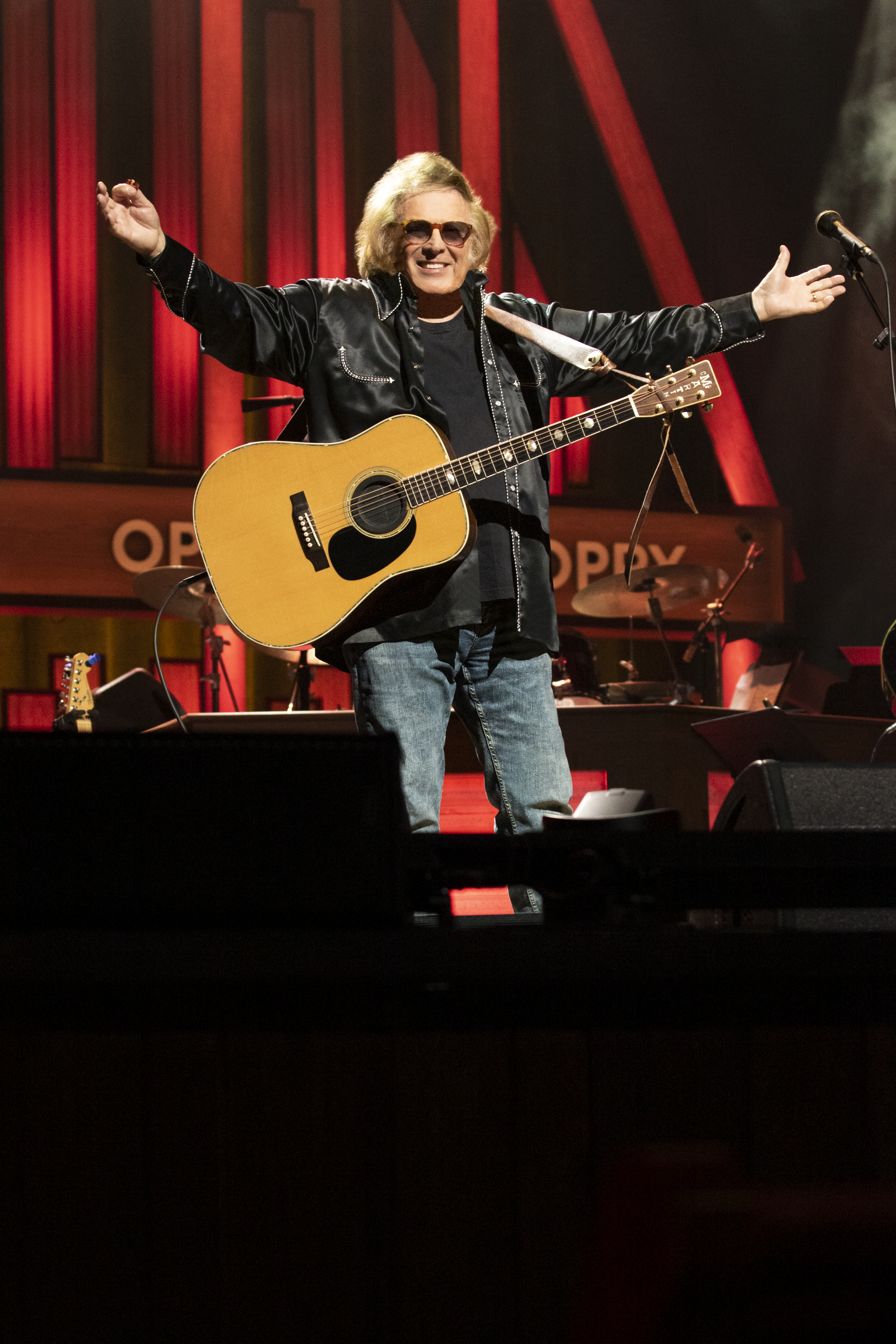
Don McLean performing in the C'Ya On the Flipside II benefit at the Grand Ole Opry in Nashville

McLean's albums did not match the commercial success of American Pie, but he became a major concert attraction in the United States and overseas. His repertoire included old concert hall numbers and the catalogues of singers such as Buddy Holly and Frank Sinatra. The years spent playing gigs in small clubs and coffee houses in the 1960s transformed into well-paced performances. McLean's first concerts at Carnegie Hall in New York and the Royal Albert Hall in London in 1972 were critically acclaimed.

In later years, McLean continued to tour the United States, Canada and Europe (2011, 2012) and Australia (2013). In June 2011, McLean appeared at the Glastonbury Festival in Pilton, UK, and in 2014 at California's Stagecoach Country Music Festival.

During 2018, McLean embarked on a world tour with concerts in North America, UK, Ireland, Belgium, Switzerland, Germany, Israel, Norway and Finland. His concert at the London Palladium was reviewed positively by The Times:

"His masterpiece ("American Pie") remains one of the great achievements of the singer-songwriter era: eight and a half minutes of allegory, reflection and melody documenting the history of rock'n'roll and the death of 1950s innocence. He played it, of course, and brilliantly, getting everyone creaking on to their feet and singing along. Before that came almost two hours of well-worn rock'n'roll and acoustic folk that placed McLean somewhere between a straight-up entertainer and a poetic maverick." – Marilynn Kingwell, The Times

The Jerusalem Post noted that "McLean was the consummate professional in presenting his master class of the Great American Songbook" in their review of his June 2018 Tel Aviv concert.

In 2022, McLean toured through Europe, starting in Wales and ending in Sweden, to celebrate the 50th anniversary of "American Pie".

In 2023, McLean's Australian tour concluded with 24 shows in Australia and New Zealand. His performances received positive critical reception.

== Legacy and influence ==
The plane crash that killed musicians Buddy Holly, Ritchie Valens and The Big Bopper has become known as "The Day the Music Died", after the expression was used repeatedly by McLean, a fan of Holly, in "American Pie". Holly's death for him symbolized the "loss of innocence" of the early rock-'n-roll generation.

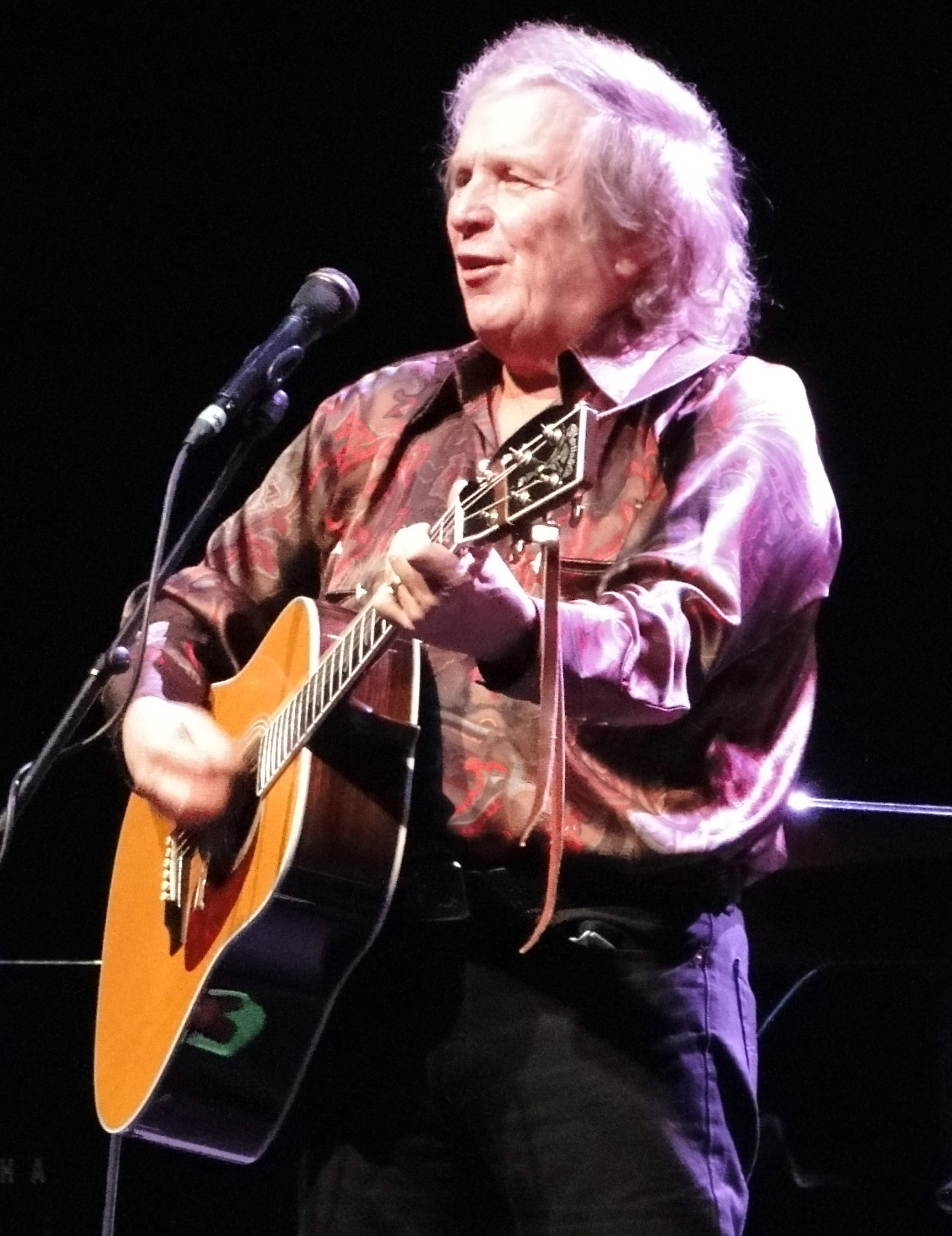
McLean at the Royal Albert Hall in London, October 2012

Musician Lori Lieberman was inspired by a McLean performance in late 1971 to co-write "Killing Me Softly with His Song". In November 1971, Lieberman, then 20, went out to see Don McLean perform at the Troubadour nightclub in Los Angeles. Lieberman was strongly affected by McLean's performance and wrote poetic notes on a paper napkin while he was performing "Empty Chairs". Afterwards she shared her reaction with her manager, Norman Gimbel, who had long been searching for a way to use a phrase he had copied from a novel translated from Spanish, "killing me softly with his blues". Gimbel passed the lyrics to his songwriting partner Charles Fox, who in turn composed the music to "Killing Me Softly with His Song". Lieberman's version, released as a single in 1972, did not chart but was heard by Roberta Flack, who recorded it with slight changes to create a number-one hit. Two decades later it was recorded by the Fugees, who had another hit. McLean said in 1973 that he was surprised to find out that the song described his singing. "I'm absolutely amazed. I've heard both Lori's and Roberta's version and I must say I'm very humbled about the whole thing. You can't help but feel that way about a song written and performed as well as this one is." After decades of confirming Lieberman's contribution, Fox and Gimbel changed their story about the song's origins to downplay her role. Gimbel threatened McLean with a lawsuit in 2008, demanding he remove from his website an assertion that McLean was the inspiration for "Killing Me Softly", but McLean responded by showing Gimbel his own words confirming the inspiration, published in 1973.

"Vincent" was rapper Tupac Shakur's favorite song. Shakur's girlfriend reportedly played the song for him when he was hospitalized and in a coma. Shakur's mother also insisted the song be included in a documentary about the rapper's life.

President Joe Biden capped the official state visit of South Korean President Yoon Suk-Yeol with a state dinner on April 27, 2023, at the White House to celebrate the two nations' 70-year alliance. Following a round of musical performances, Yoon took to the microphone himself with a rendition of "American Pie". Biden then presented Yoon with a guitar autographed by McLean.

In May 2025, “American Pie” was again invoked on the world stage when speakers at the Pontifical North American College in Rome blasted the song, along with Bruce Springsteen’s "Born in the U.S.A.", to welcome U.S. cardinals celebrating the election of Pope Leo XIV, the first American-born pontiff.

=== Honors ===
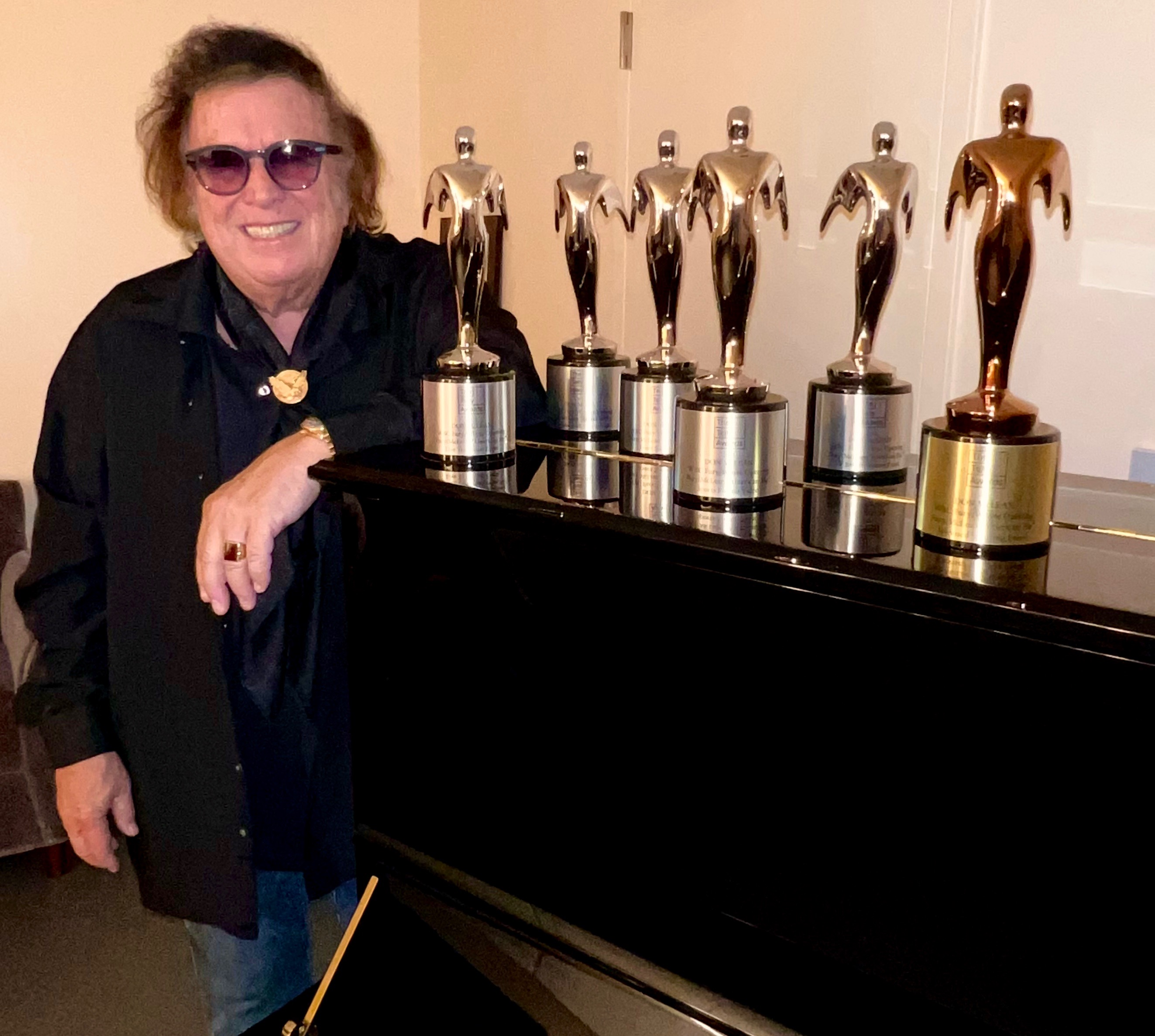
Don McLean won six Telly Awards for the Fury-Whyte fight opening.

McLean's alma mater, Iona College in New Rochelle, New York, conferred an honorary doctorate on him in 2001. McLean has since been vocal in his criticism of the college: "Iona was, in my day, a college for the average student who wanted to go home after class. The educational experience was perfect for me. I loved the small Greek revival style campus buildings and I got to put on little shows in Doorley Hall auditorium. Since those days, the Irish Christian Brothers have been virtually destroyed by the disgusting behavior of many in their order as charges of mass child molestation have destroyed their ranks. No punishment is harsh enough when you think of trusting Catholic parents giving their children over to these cynical monsters. I am very disappointed in the Irish Christian Brothers and Iona College."

In February 2002, "American Pie" was inducted into the Grammy Hall of Fame. In 2004, McLean was inducted into the Songwriters Hall of Fame.

In February 2012, McLean won the BBC Radio 2 Folk Awards Life Time Achievement award.

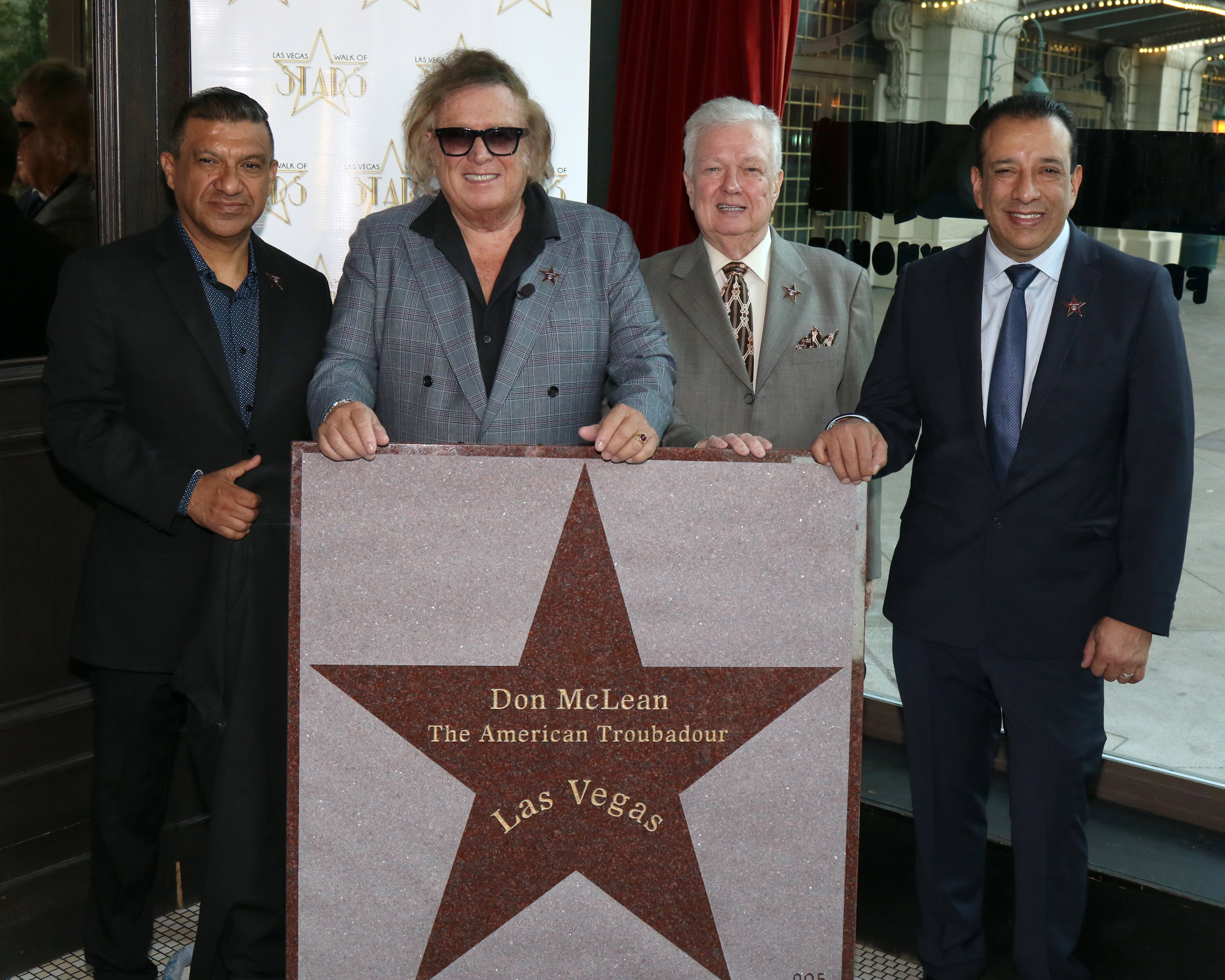
Don McLean being presented with a star on the Las Vegas Walk of Stars

In March 2012, the PBS network broadcast a feature-length documentary about the life and music of McLean called Don McLean: American Troubadour produced by filmmaker Jim Brown.

In March 2017, McLean's single "American Pie" was designated an "aural treasure" by the Library of Congress, "worthy of preservation" in the National Recording Registry "as part of America's patrimony". In 1991, a re-issue of "American Pie" reached the UK top 20 singles chart and in July 2017, "American Pie" peaked at number 6 on the Billboard Rock Digital Songs Sales chart, nearly 50 years after its first release.

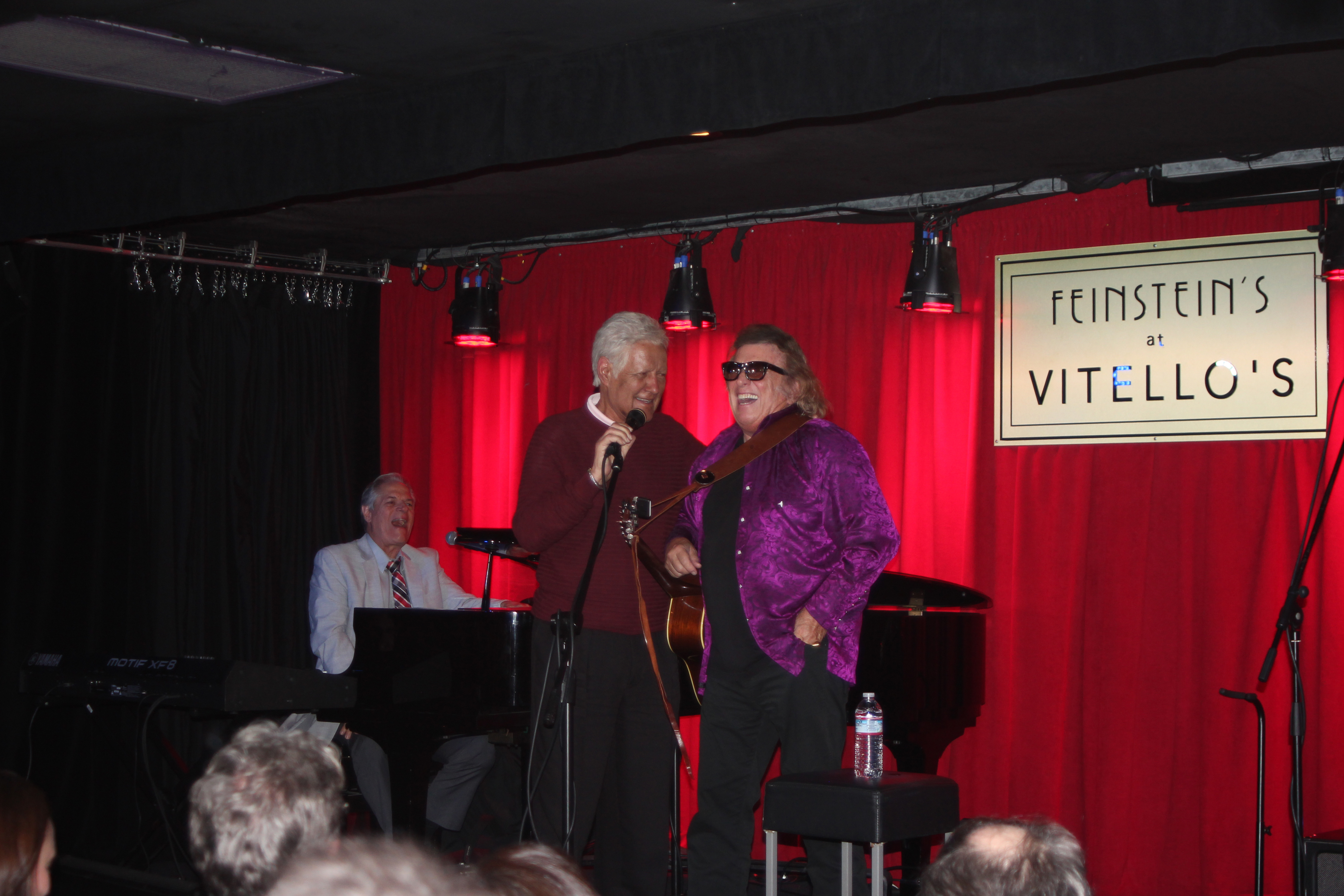
Alex Trebek and Don McLean onstage at Trebek's annual Christmas Party

In May 2019, the UCLA Student Alumni Association awarded McLean its George and Ira Gershwin Award for Lifetime Musical Achievement. However, the award was rescinded before it was formally bestowed because of McLean's conviction for domestic abuse. In response, McLean issued the following statement: "UCLA awarded this lifetime achievement award and then took it back because you found out about my squabble with my ex-wife. This has been all over the Internet for three years. Are you people morons? This is settled law. Maybe I need to give you some bribe money to grease the college wheels? I am guilty of nothing to do with assault and you had better make that clear. We live in a dark age of accusation and not law."

On November 7, 2019, McLean returned to New Rochelle to view a new mural depicting a likeness of his younger self, with lyrics from "American Pie", on the side of a building on the corner of 134 North Avenue and Bonnefoy Place, painted by artist Loic Ercolessi for a non-profit organization, Street Art for Mankind. The mural includes the likeness of singer/songwriter Alicia Keys, with lyrics to the song "Empire State of Mind", which she performed with Jay-Z.

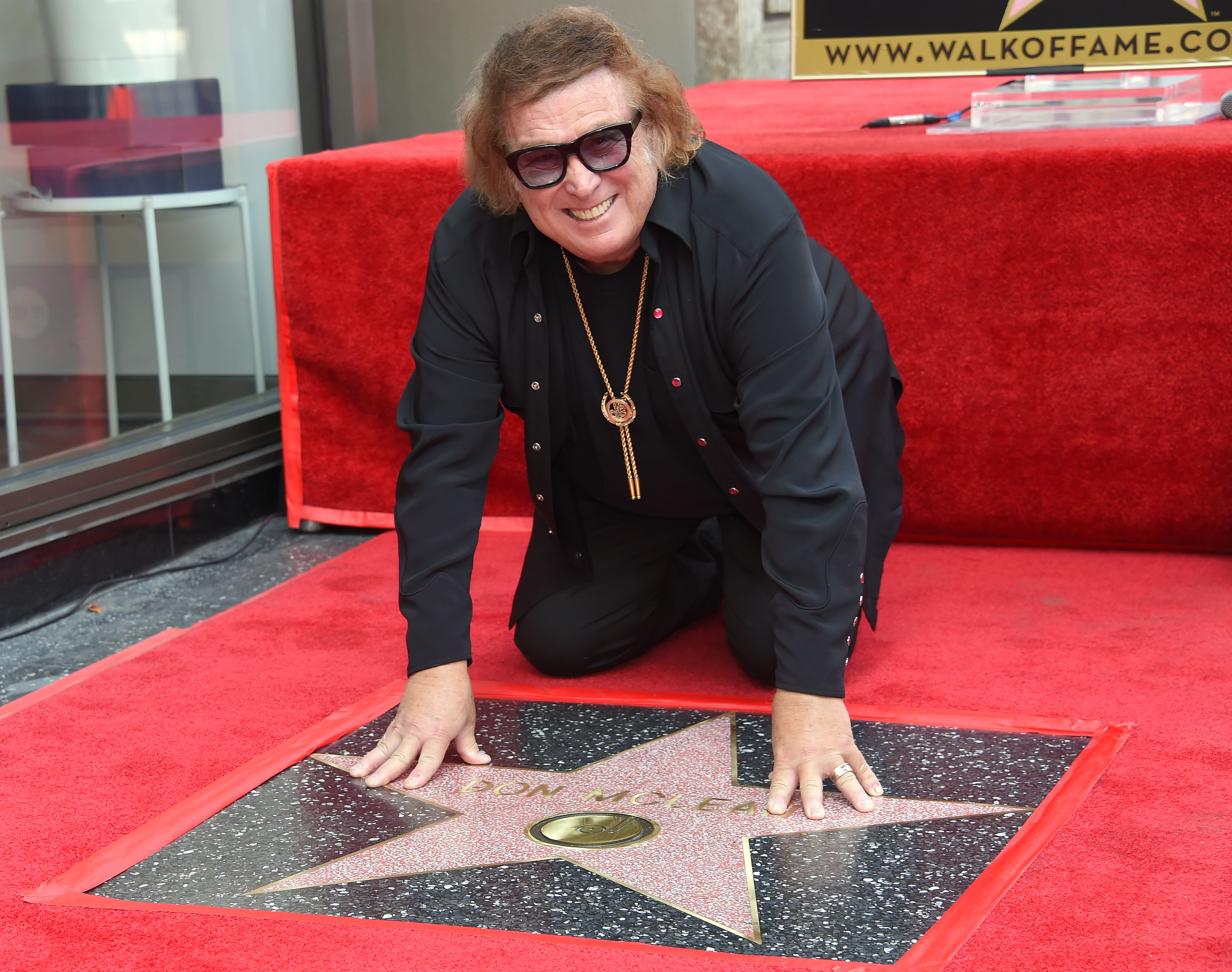
McLean at the Hollywood Walk of Fame in August 2021

Throughout McLean's career artists including George Michael, Garth Brooks, Madonna, Drake, Josh Groban and others have recorded his songs. At a ceremony in October 2019, plaques certified by the Recording Industry Association of America for gold, platinum, and multi-platinum sales in the United States as well as presentations from Australia, Austria, Belgium, France, Sweden, Switzerland, and the United Kingdom were bestowed on McLean. He said: "As a songwriter your songs are like your children, and you are hopeful everyone loves them as much as you do, but rarely is that the case. I am so grateful that songs I have written have touched so many lives and have been recorded by so many great artists."

Television host Alex Trebek asked McLean to sing for him and his Jeopardy family at his annual Christmas party in 2019. McLean was on his "bucket list". The event was held at an Italian restaurant near Trebek's home.

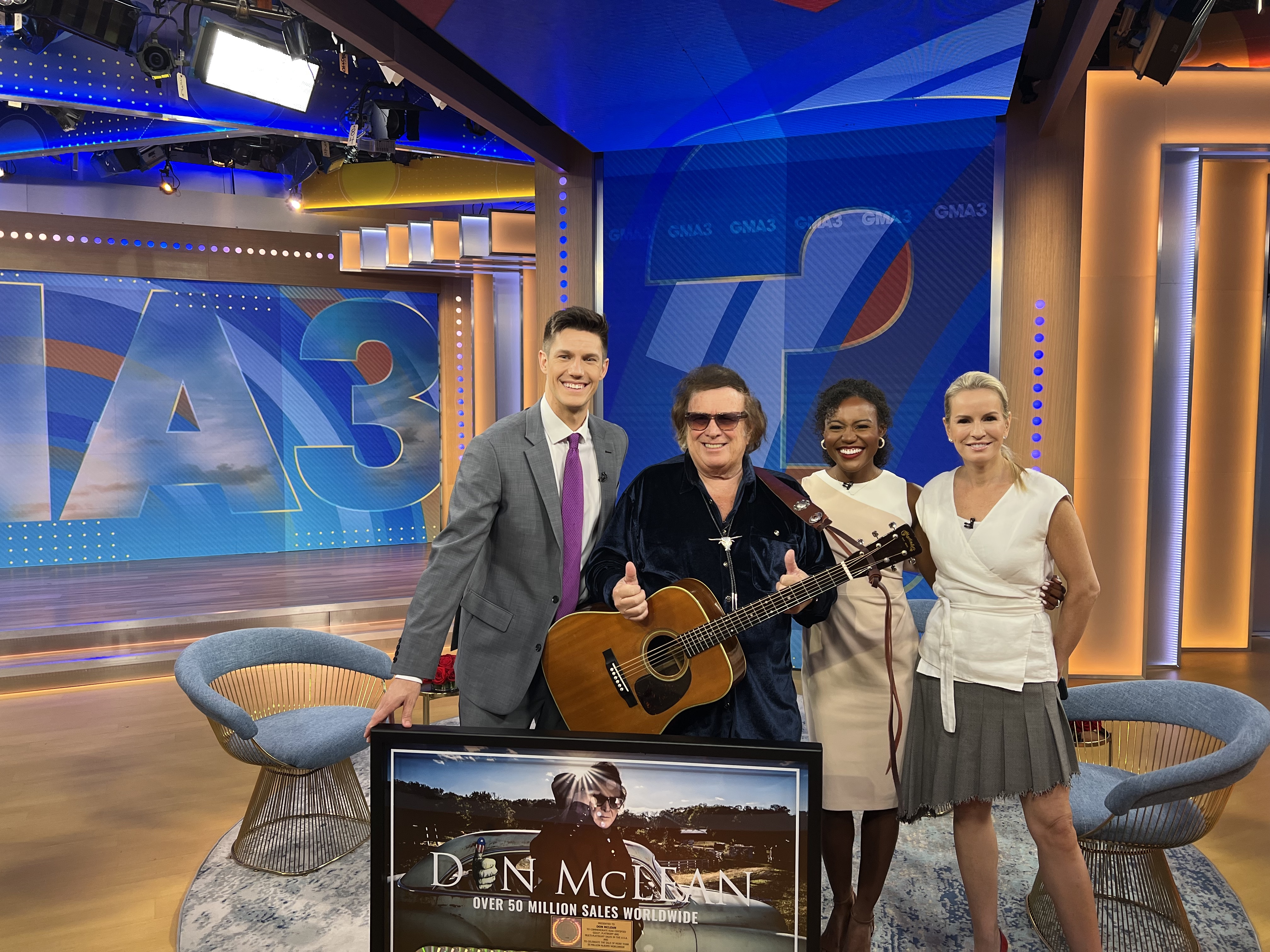
Don McLean receives a 50-million record sales plaque from the TV show Good Morning America.

In February 2021, to commemorate the 50th anniversary of "American Pie", McLean recorded an A cappella rendition with the band Home Free. He stars in the music video with the singers in a virtual collaboration. The video won three Telly Awards in 2021.

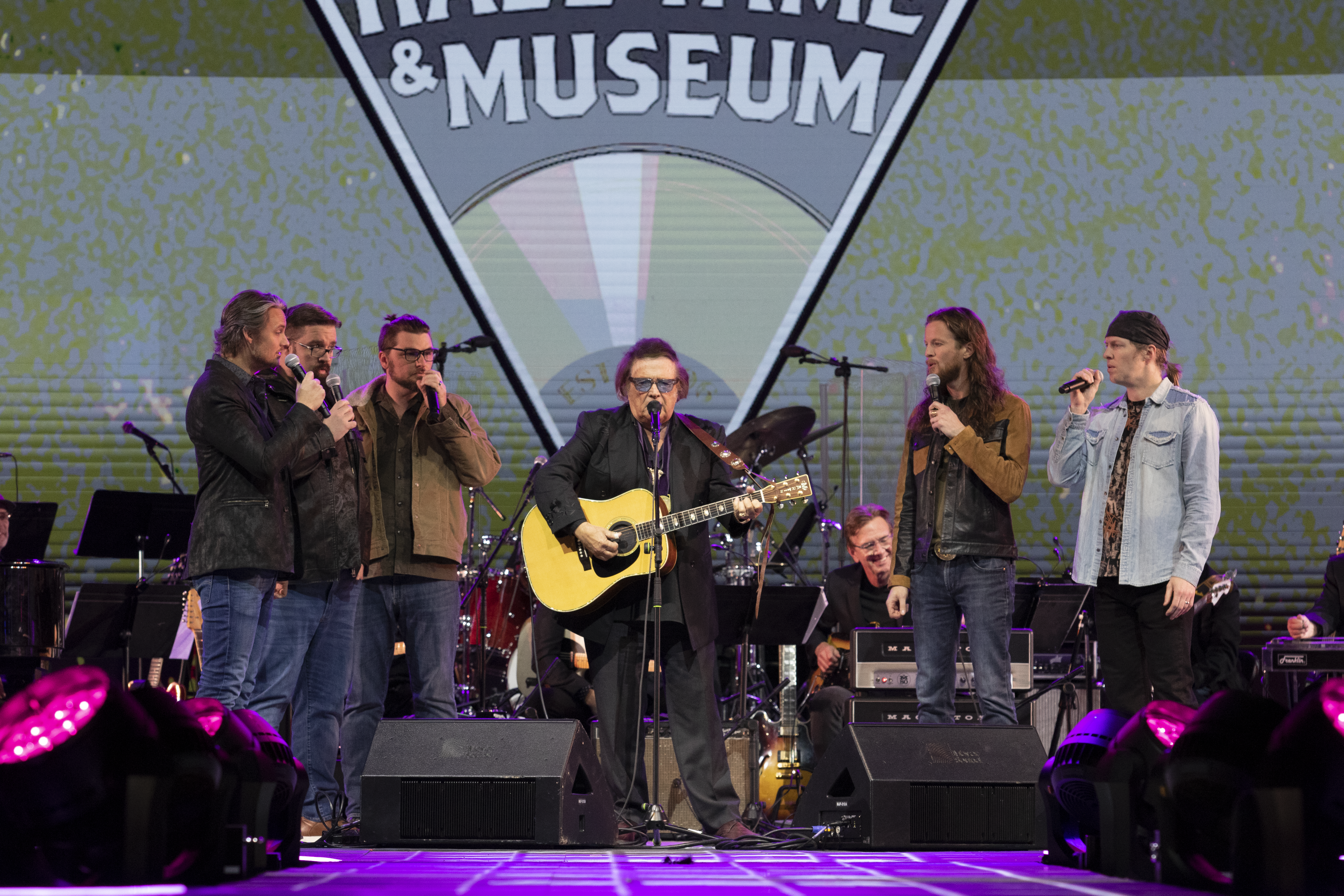
Don McLean's performance with Home Free at induction ceremony into the Nashville Musicians Hall of Fame.

McLean received a star on the Hollywood Walk of Fame on August 16, 2021, in the Music Category at 6314 Hollywood Boulevard, in front of The Pie Hole restaurant (corner of Hollywood and Vine). Joining in the festivities was McLean's friend "Weird Al" Yankovic, a fellow Hollywood Walk of Fame recipient.

In September 2022, McLean received a 50-million record sales plaque from the TV show GMA: The Third Hour.

On November 22, 2022, McLean was inducted into the Musicians Hall of Fame and Museum in Nashville, Tennessee.

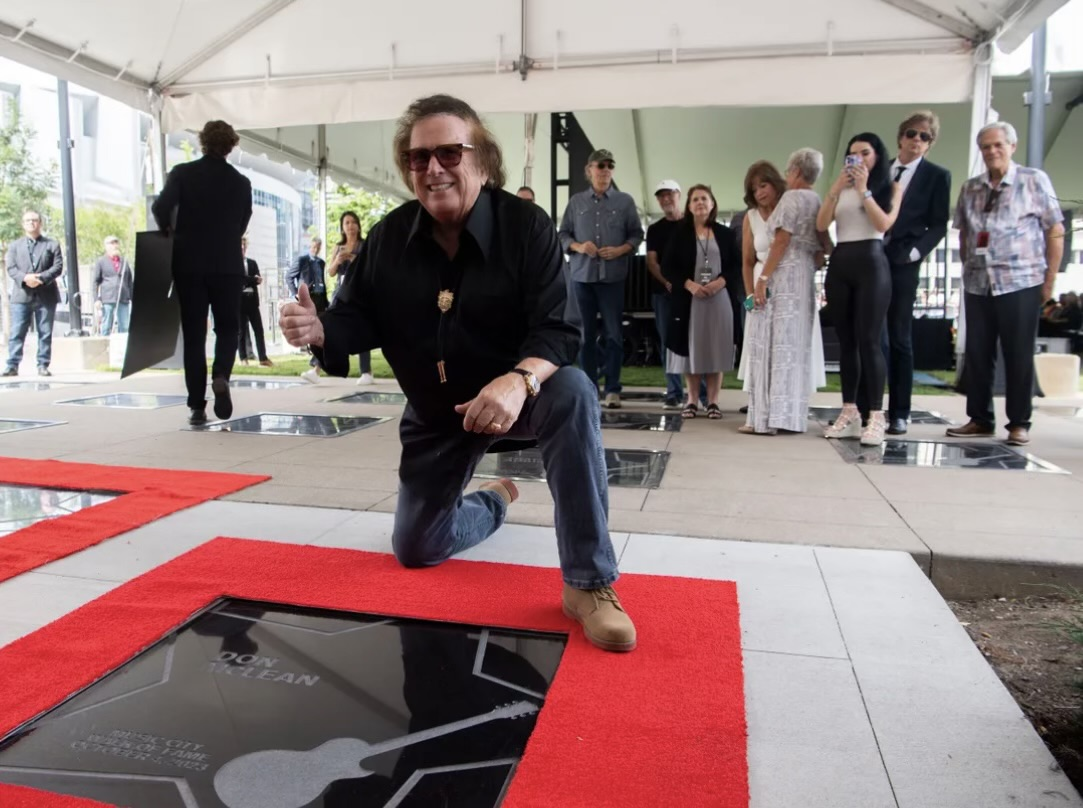
Don McLean inducted into the Music City Walk of Fame

In October 2023, Ritchie Valens' sister, Connie Valens, traveled to Nashville to induct McLean into the Music City Walk of Fame. "I am so honored to represent the families of Buddy Holly, JP Richardson, and my brother Ritchie Valens", she said. For years, she could not listen to her brother's music because "it hurt too much", but she could listen to "American Pie". The previous year, she had met McLean when she was invited to take part in the documentary The Day The Music Died. They gathered at the Surf Ballroom in Clear Lake, Iowa, where her brother (and Buddy Holly and the Big Bopper) had their last performance before the plane crash. "I thanked Don and told him he had immortalized my brother Ritchie, J.P, and Buddy. He'd taken a terrible tragedy and written rock and roll history." She went on to say that because of McLean, "the music didn't die".

== Personal life ==
McLean was raised in the Catholic faith of his mother, Elizabeth McLean; his father, Donald McLean, was a Protestant. His father died when McLean was 15. McLean has claimed that he grew up in a physically abusive household, and was abused by both his parents and his sister. Don McLean has been married twice, with both marriages ending in divorce. His first wife was Carol Sauvion, of Philadelphia, who went on to win an Emmy and Peabody Award for her PBS television series Craft in America. They were married from 1969 to 1972 and had no children.

In 1978, McLean had a romantic relationship with an Israeli girl named Orly Tzarfati (now Orly Ziv, residing in Toronto). The relationship lasted for about seven months and ended in the early 1980s.

His second marriage was to Patrisha Shnier McLean, of Montreal, Canada, from 1987 to 2016. They have two children, Jackie and Wyatt, and two grandchildren, Rosa and Mya. Their marriage ended after McLean was arrested and charged with misdemeanor domestic violence at their home in Camden, Maine, and Shnier McLean filed for divorce, citing "adultery, cruel and abusive treatment, and irreconcilable differences".

In 2018, McLean confirmed his romantic relationship with model and reality star Paris Dylan.

McLean is an ambassador for Teen Cancer America and performed at the Teen Cancer America and UCLA Health fundraising Backyard Concert in 2018. During the show, McLean sang a duet of his song "Vincent" with Ed Sheeran. The Don McLean Foundation is a charity set up by McLean to be funded by all his income in perpetuity. Its headquarters is based at Lakeview, the Don McLean Maine residence, and it will serve as a center for fundraisers and conferences as well as a nature preserve. Organizations that support the needy in the State of Maine and throughout the United States will be beneficiaries.

On May 23, 2024, McLean and Paris Dylan attended a state dinner at the White House, hosted by President Joe Biden and First Lady Jill Biden, in honor of Kenyan President William Ruto and First Lady Rachel Ruto.

=== Abuse allegations and conviction ===
On January 18, 2016 McLean's then wife, Patrisha Shnier McLean, alleged that after four hours of "terrorizing" her McLean pinned her to a bed until she broke free and ran to the bathroom, where she called the police as he tried to break down the door. McLean was arrested on suspicion of domestic violence and pled guilty to domestic violence assault, criminal restraint, criminal mischief and making domestic violence threats. McLean paid $3,660 in fines and was not sentenced to any jail time. Under Maine's deferred disposition law, the State agreed to dismiss the domestic violence assault charge if McLean complied with the court's orders for one year, and the charge was expunged a year later. Shnier McLean filed for divorce, citing "adultery, cruel and abusive treatment, and irreconcilable differences". McLean denied that he physically abused Shnier McLean, and his lawyer released a statement stating McLean agreed to the plea deal in the interest of privacy. In March 2017, a Maine court granted Shnier-McLean's request for a 10-year protection order against McLean.

In a 2020 interview, Shnier McLean alleged McLean had created a cult-like household, remarking, "I do feel there is an element of brainwashing there. I relate to a lot of the things they say about cults like the charismatic leader, and how their version of things becomes your version". McLean's daughter Jackie told Rolling Stone in 2021 that her father was emotionally abusive and, like her mother, stated her father created a cultish environment. According to Jackie, McLean used paralyzing verbal attacks, forced isolation, and threats to withhold love or financial support. The article alleged that communications between Jackie and McLean suggested "a pattern of asserting control and manipulation over Jackie, her actions and memories, and a seeming drive by the elder McLean to maintain a certain public image". In one email, McLean wrote to his daughter, "unless you support me publicly and frequently you should not expect me to lift a finger for you nor will I give you another red cent."

When interviewed for the article, McLean admitted to some aspects of Jackie's account, but denied that his behavior constituted abuse. He also mentioned that he had grown up in a physically abusive household, where he was "hurt a lot by my sister, my mother, my father; I was hit a lot." McLean denied this in a later interview, saying, "Absolutely not true. I was never abused as a child at all."

== Discography ==
- Tapestry (1970)
- American Pie (1971)
- Don McLean (1972)
- Playin' Favorites (1973)
- Homeless Brother (1974)
- Prime Time (1977)
- Chain Lightning (1978)
- Believers (1981)
- Love Tracks (1988)
- For the Memories (1989)
- Headroom (1991)
- Christmas (1991)
- The River of Love (1995)
- Christmas Dreams (1997)
- Sings Marty Robbins (2001)
- You've Got to Share: Songs for Children (2003)
- The Western Album (2003)
- Rearview Mirror: An American Musical Journey (2005)
- Addicted to Black (2009)
- Botanical Gardens (2018)
- Still Playin' Favorites (2020)
- American Boys (2024)
