= Girl's Day discography =

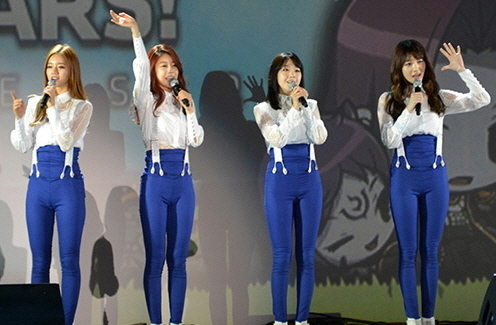
- Girl's day at Nexon Maple Story 10th anniversary event, on May 19, 2013
- Studio albums: 2
- Extended plays: 7
- Compilation albums: 1
- Singles: 20
- Music videos: 21

South Korean girl group Girl's Day has released two studio albums, one compilation album, seven extended plays, and twenty singles. The group debuted on July 7, 2010 with the EP Girl's Day Party #1, with the song "Tilt My Head" as their first single.

== Albums ==
=== Studio albums ===
Title	Album details	Peak chart positions	Sales
Title	Album details	KOR	Sales
Expectation	Released: March 14, 2013; Label: DreamTea Entertainment; Format: CD, digital download	4	KOR: 13,431
Love	Released: July 7, 2015; Label: DreamTea Entertainment; Format: CD, digital download	3	KOR: 40,510; JPN: 4,589

=== Compilation albums ===
Title	Album details	Peak chart positions	Sales
Title	Album details	JPN	Sales
Best Album	Released: November 26, 2014; Label: DreamTea Entertainment, KISS Entertainment; Format: CD, DVD, photobook	—	JPN: 1,742

=== Reissues ===
Title	Album details	Peak chart positions	Sales
Title	Album details	KOR	Sales
Female President	Released: June 24, 2013; Label: DreamTea Entertainment; Format: CD, digital download	6	KOR: 14,829

== Extended plays ==
Title	Details	Peak chart positions		Sales
Title	Details	KOR	US World	Sales
Girl's Day Party #1	Released: July 9, 2010; Label: DreamTea Entertainment; Format: Digital download	12	—	
Everyday	Released: July 6, 2011; Label: DreamTea Entertainment; Format: CD, digital download	4	—	KOR: 7,382
Everyday II	Released: April 17, 2012; Label: DreamTea Entertainment; Format: CD, digital download	11	—	KOR: 5,907
Girl's Day Everyday #3	Released: January 3, 2014; Label: DreamTea Entertainment; Format: CD, digital download	4	—	KOR: 23,014
Girl's Day Everyday #4	Released: July 14, 2014; Label: DreamTea Entertainment; Format: CD, digital download	3	—	KOR: 28,018
I Miss You	Released: October 15, 2014; Label: DreamTea Entertainment; Format: Smart card, digital download	—N/a (Note: Sales for smart cards were not recognized by Gaon Music Chart until their policy was updated in December 2017.)		
Girl's Day Everyday #5	Released: March 27, 2017; Label: DreamTea Entertainment; Format: CD, digital download	5	7	KOR: 11,301
"—" denotes releases that did not chart or were not released in that region.

== Singles ==
Title	Year	Peak chart positions					Sales (Note: Sales figures for Korean-language singles are digital downloads while Japanese-language singles are physical units, except noted.)	Album
Title	Year	KOR	KOR Hot	JPN	JPN Hot	US World	Sales	Album
"Tilt My Head" (갸우뚱) (Girl's Day Party #1)	2010	83	—N/a	—	—	—		Girl's Day Party #1
"How About Me?" (나 어때)	2010	88	—N/a	—	—	—		Non-album single
"Nothing Lasts Forever" (잘해줘봐야) (Girl's Day Party #2)	2010	63	—N/a	—	—	—		Everyday
"Twinkle Twinkle" (반짝반짝) (Girl's Day Party #3)	2011	5	—N/a	—	—	—	KOR: 2,076,188	Everyday
"Hug Me Once" (한번만 안아줘)	2011	15	96	—	—	—	KOR: 1,422,182	Everyday
"Don't Flirt" (너, 한눈 팔지마) (Girl's Day Party #4)	2011	11	14	—	—	—	KOR: 951,687	Everyday II
"Oh! My God"	2012	13	12	—	—	—	KOR: 821,818	Everyday II
"Blue Rain 2012"	2012	21	51	—	—	—	KOR: 177,312	Non-album single
"Don't Forget Me" (나를 잊지마요) (Girl's Day Party #5)	2012	14	15	—	—	—	KOR: 791,642	Expectation
"White Day"	2013	43	33	—	—	—	KOR: 122,605	Expectation
"Expect" (기대해)	2013	9	9	—	—	15	KOR: 1,108,467	Expectation
"Female President" (여자 대통령)	2013	5	7	—	—	7	KOR: 818,480	Female President (Repackage)
"Please Tell Me" (말해줘요) (Girl's Day Party #6)	2013	9	14	—	—	—	KOR: 311,648	Non-album singles
"Let's Go"	2013	49	85	—	—	—	KOR: 64,592	Non-album singles
"Something"	2014	2	2	—	—	9	KOR: 1,429,172	Girl's Day Everyday 3
"Darling"	2014	1	15	—	—	5	KOR: 1,214,795	Girl's Day Everyday 4
"I Miss You" (보고싶어)	2014	4	—N/a	—	—	—	KOR: 460,805	I Miss You
"Hello Bubble"	2015	13	—N/a	—	—	11	KOR: 258,832	Love
"Ring My Bell" (링마벨)	2015	2	—N/a	—	—	25	KOR: 883,481	Love
"Darling (Japanese Version)"	2015	—	—N/a	13	22	—	JPN: 14,707	Best Album
"I'll Be Yours"	2017	3	—N/a	—	—	11	KOR: 400,590	Girl's Day Everyday 5
"—" denotes releases that did not chart or were not released in that region.

== Other charted songs ==
Title	Year	Peak chart positions		Sales	Album
Title	Year	KOR	KOR Hot	Sales	Album
"Two of Us" (둘이서)	2012	175	—		Everyday II
"Please Don't Go" (그녀를 믿지마)	2013	193	—		Expectation
"Timing"	2014	88	84	KOR: 19,441	Everyday 4
"Look At Me"	2014	82	90	KOR: 20,985	Everyday 4
"With Me"	2015	81	—	KOR: 31,671	Love
"Macaron" (마카롱)	2015	— (Note: Macaron did not enter the Gaon Digital Chart but peaked at number 51 on the Download chart for the 29th Week of 2015.)	—	KOR: 28,063	Love
"Thirsty"	2017	—	—	KOR: 17,946	Everyday 5
"Love Again"	2017	—	—	KOR: 16,233	Everyday 5
"—" denotes releases that did not chart or were not released in that region.

== Soundtracks ==
Year	Title	Album
2011	"If You Give Me Your Heart"	Sparkling OST
2011	"Cupid"	City Hunter OST
2011	"Honey Honey"	The Woman of Our Home OST
2011	"New Trial"	Dungeon & Fighter
2012	"Vine Song"	My Husband Got a Family OST
2012	"Nungcool Song"	My Husband Got a Family OST
2014	"You And I"	Doctor Stranger OST
2014	"들려줘요"	Dad For Rent OST
2014	"One Person"	The King's Face OST
2015	"Ajjil Ajjil"	The Family Is Coming OST
2015	"I Am Korea"	I Am Korea
2015	"It Hurts"	Mask OST
2015	"Everyday With You "	Reply 1988 OST

== Collaborations ==
The following releases are in Korean, unless otherwise specified.

Year	Information	Song
2011	Ready!: Artist: Nami Tamaki; Released: February 23, 2011; Language: Japanese	"Girlie Night"
2015	National Grand Chorus: I Am Korea: Artist: Various Artists; Released: May 15, 2015	"The Day We Meet"
2015	'One K' Campaign Song: Artist: Various Artists; Released: September 21, 2015	"One Dream One Korea"
2016	HOOXI THE BEGINNING: Artist: Various Artists; Released: December 22, 2016	"Beautiful World"

== Videography ==
=== Music videos ===
List of music videos, showing year released and director
Title	Year	Director(s)	Ref.
"Tilt My Head"	2010	Cho So-young	
"How About Me"	2010	Unknown	
"Nothing Lasts Forever"	2010	Kwon Soon-wook	
"Twinkle Twinkle"	2011	Kwon Soon-wook	
"If You Give Your Heart For Me"	2011	Unknown	
"Hug Me Once"	2011	Kwon Soon-wook	
"Don't Flirt"	2011	Kwon Soon-wook	
"Oh My God"	2012	Kwon Soon-wook	
"Don't Forget Me"	2012	Unknown	
"White Day"	2013	Unknown	
"Expect"	2013	Shin Seung-hwan	
"Expect (Dance Version)"	2013	Shin Seung-hwan	
"Female President"	2013	Lim Sung-kwan	
"Female President (Dance Version)"	2013	Lim Sung-kwan	
"Let's Go"	2013	Unknown	
"Something"	2014	Lim Sung-kwan	
"Something (Dance Version)"	2014	Lim Sung-kwan	
"Darling"	2014	Cho Seung-jun	
"I Miss You"	2014	Lim Sung-kwan	
"Hello Bubble"	2015	Unknown	
"Ring My Bell"	2015	PDEEBELL (Kim Jong-wan)	
"Darling (Japanese Version)"	2015	PDEEBELL (Kim Jong-wan)	
"I'll Be Yours"	2017	Digipedi	
