= List of Gaon Digital Chart number ones of 2014 =

The Gaon Digital Chart of the Gaon Music Chart is a chart that ranks the best-performing songs in South Korea. The data is collected by the Korea Music Content Association. It consists of weekly (listed from Sunday to Saturday), monthly and yearly charts. Below is a list of songs that topped the weekly and monthly charts. The Digital Chart ranks songs according to their performance on the Gaon Download, Streaming, and BGM charts.

== Weekly charts ==
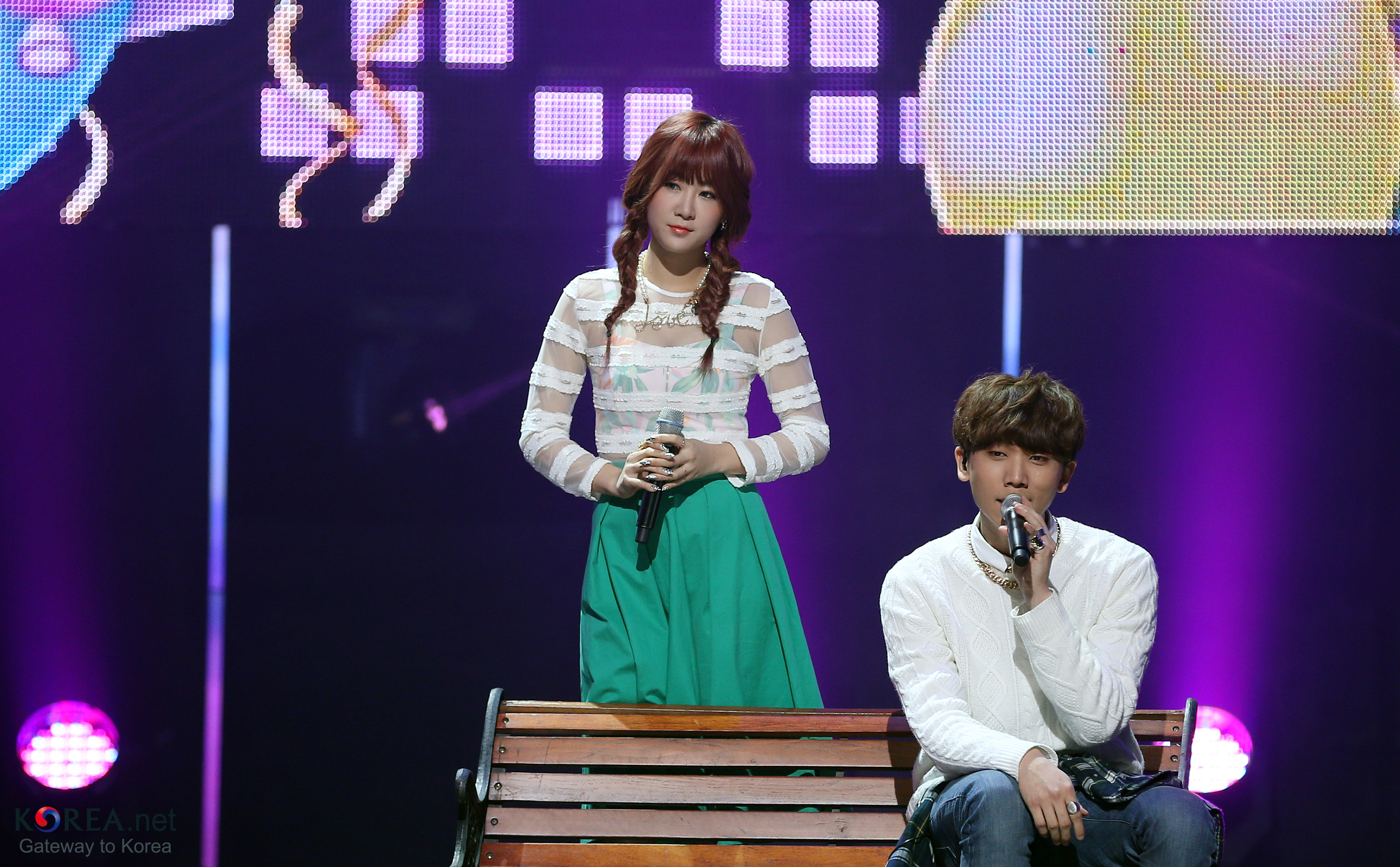
Soyou and Junggigo's "Some" was the best performing song of the year.

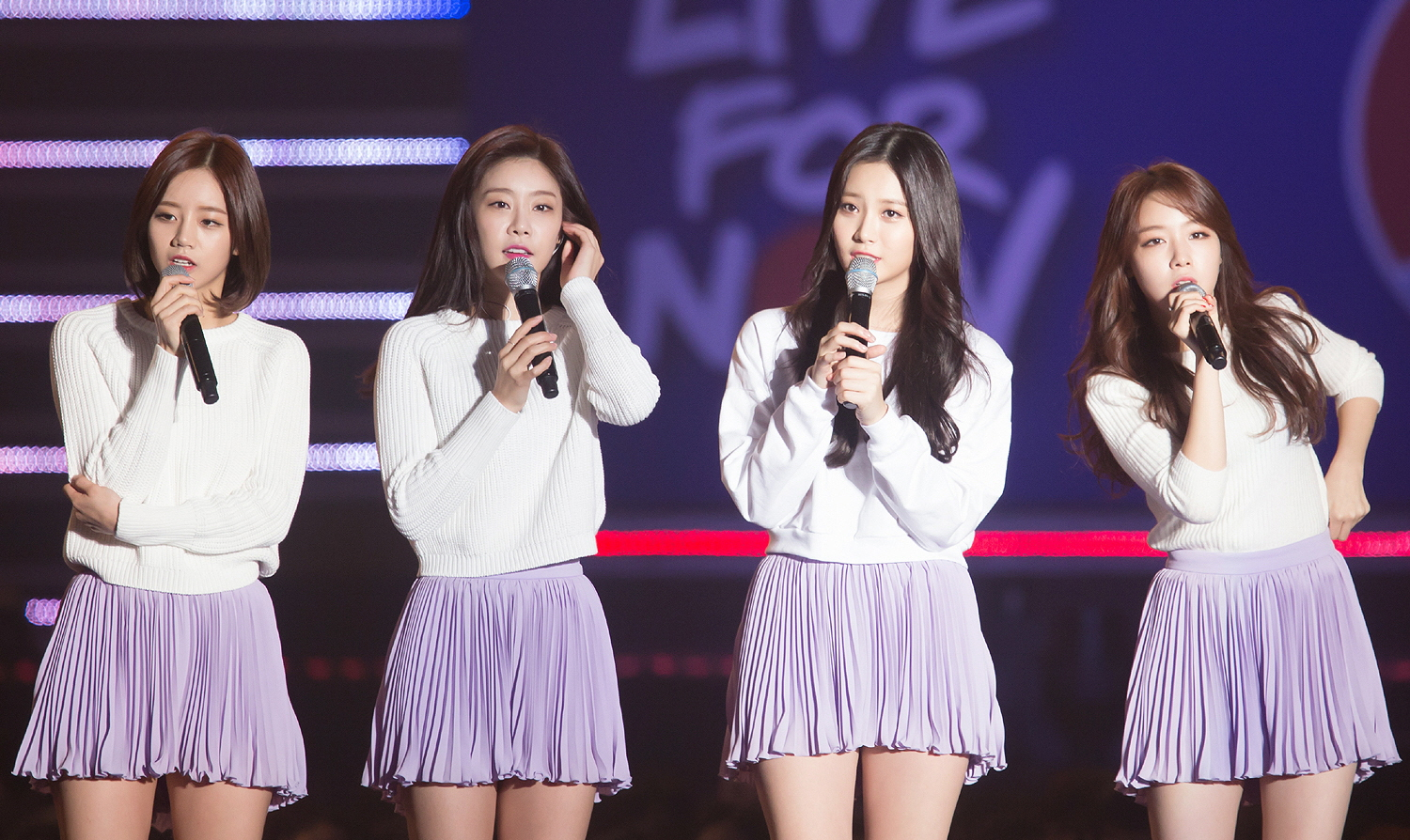
Girls' Day's "Something" was the best-selling single of January, despite not reaching number-one.

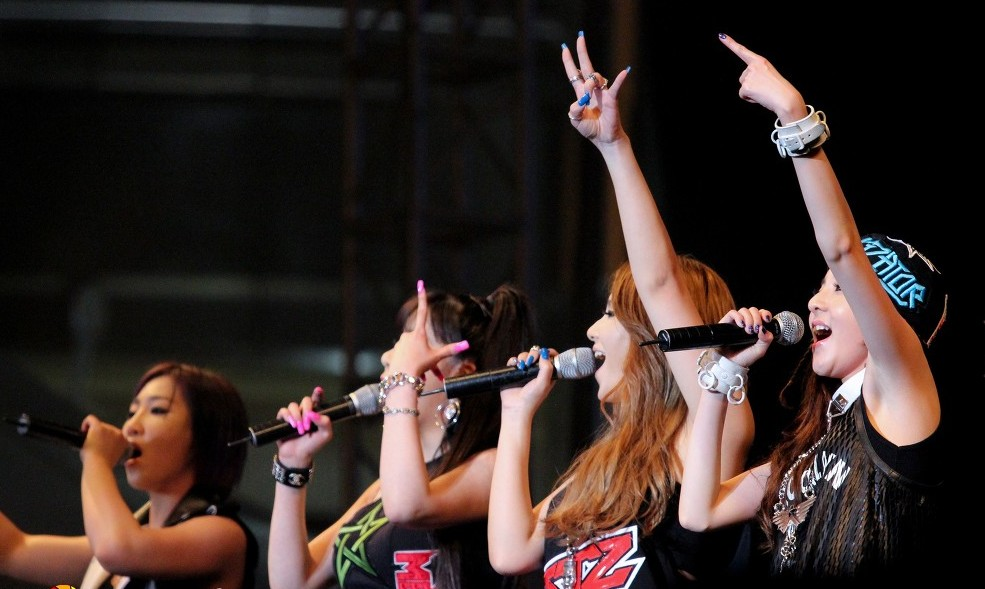
2NE1's "Come Back Home" peaked at number-one for two weeks and was the best performing song of March.

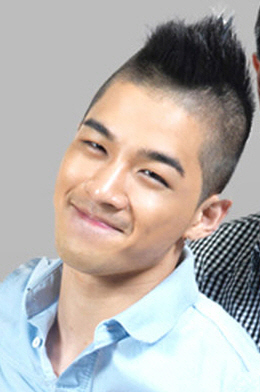
Taeyang's "Eyes, Nose, Lips" was the number-one song of June and became one of the year's top sellers.

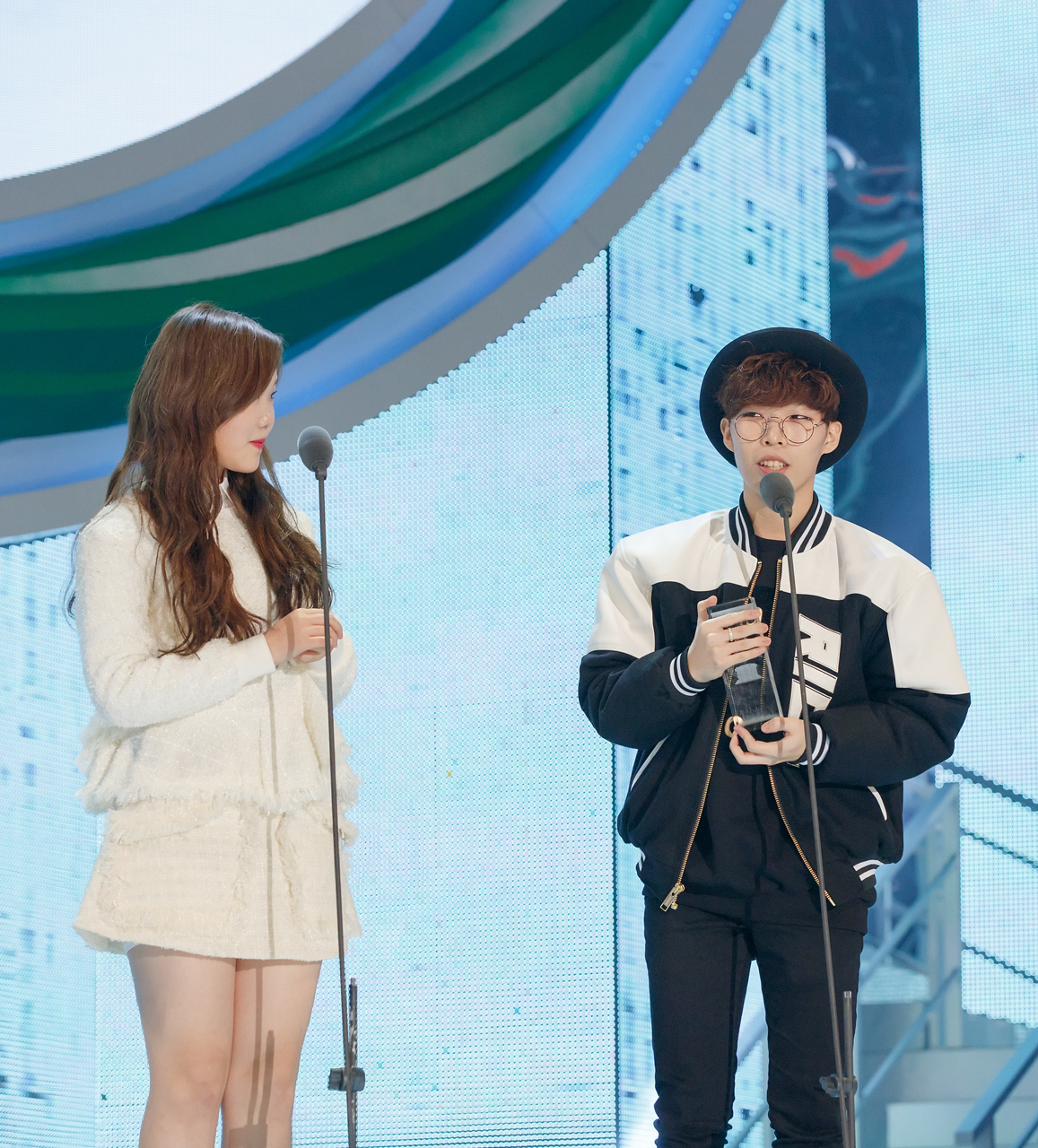
Akdong Musician held the number-one spot for three weeks in 2014 with two different singles.

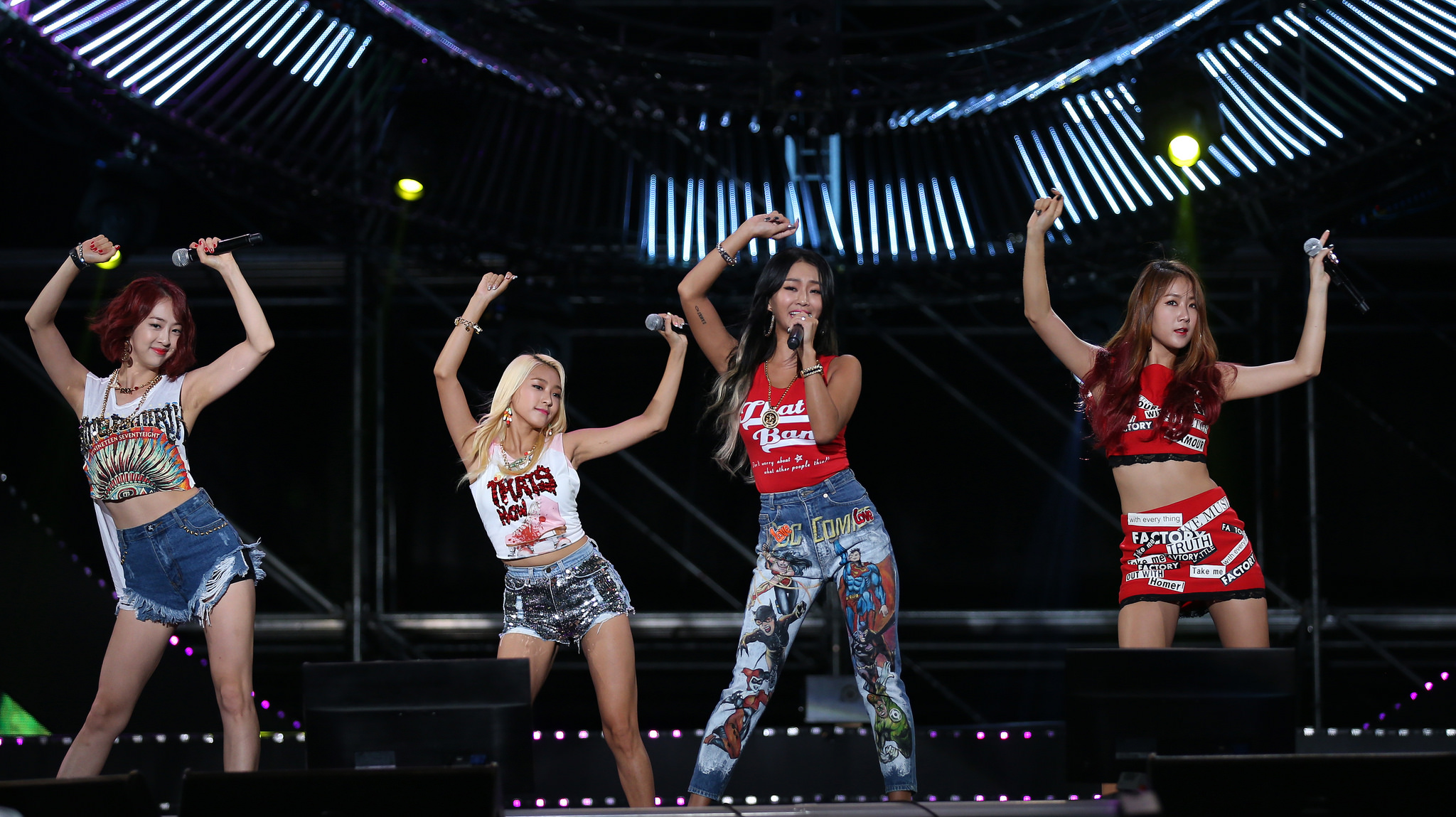
Sistar also held the number-one spot for three weeks with "Touch My Body" and "I Swear".

Key
†	Indicates best-performing single of 2014

Week end date	Song	Artist(s)	Total downloads
January 4	"We Back Then" (그대가 분다)	MC the Max	251,089
January 11	"Singing Got Better" (노래가 늘었어)	Ailee	259,226
January 18	"Shower Later" (조금 이따 샤워해)	Gary ft. Crush	310,405
January 25	"Hello" (안녕)	Hyolyn	295,690
February 1	"Let It Go"	Idina Menzel	184,498
February 8	"Let It Go"	Idina Menzel	138,969
February 15	"Some" (썸) †	Soyou & Junggigo	333,575
February 22	"Some" (썸) †	Soyou & Junggigo	182,729
March 1	"Mr.Mr."	Girls' Generation	309,297
March 8	"Come Back Home"	2NE1	293,909
March 15	"Come Back Home"	2NE1	120,481
March 22	"Whatcha Doin' Today?" (오늘 뭐해?)	4Minute	184,353
March 29	"That Kind of Guy" (그런 남자)	Bro	242,435
April 5	"Wild Flower" (야생화)	Park Hyo-shin	252,290
April 12	"200%"	Akdong Musician	468,279
April 19	"Can't Hide It" (티가 나나봐)	15&	251,677
April 26	"200%"	Akdong Musician	101,237
May 3	"Not Spring, Love or Cherry Blossoms" (봄,사랑,벚꽃 말고)	IU & HIGH4	93,335
May 10	"The Lone Duckling" (미운 오리 새끼)	g.o.d.	342,131
May 17	"Want U" (너를 원해)	Junggigo ft. Beenzino	221,970
May 24	"You You You" (너를 너를 너를)	Fly to the Sky	358,644
May 31	"Your Scent" (사람냄새)	Jung-in & Gary	366,141
June 7	"Eyes, Nose, Lips" (눈, 코, 입)	Taeyang	322,577
June 14	"No More" (이젠 아니야)	Beast	232,101
June 21	"Good Luck"	Beast	224,992
June 28	"A Midsummer Night's Sweetness" (한여름밤의 꿀)	San E, Raina	141,996
July 5	"Umbrella" (우산)	Younha	298,781
July 12	"Break Up to Make Up" (이제 그만 싸우자)	Huh Gak & Jung Eun-ji	276,153
July 19	"Darling"	Girl's Day	273,168
July 26	"Touch My Body"	Sistar	378,883
August 2	"Touch My Body"	Sistar	188,427
August 9	"Body Language"	San E ft. Bumkey	255,429
August 16	"Empty" (공허해)	Winner	397,791
August 23	"Difficult Woman" (어려운 여자)	Jang Beom-june	302,780
August 30	"I Swear"	Sistar	231,426
September 6	"I Love You" (너를 사랑해)	Yoon Mi-rae	191,015
September 13	"Can't Go to Shinchon" (신촌을 못가)	Postmen	220,540
September 20	"Can't Go to Shinchon" (신촌을 못가)	Postmen	140,009
September 27	"Only You" (당신만이)	Kwak Jin-eon, Kim Feel & Lim Do-hyuk	187,995
October 4	"How I Am" (그게나야)	Kim Dong-ryul	295,603
October 11	"How I Am" (그게나야)	Kim Dong-ryul	175,833
October 18	"Time and Fallen Leaves" (시간과 낙엽)	Akdong Musician	197,132
October 25	"Happen Ending" (헤픈엔딩)	Epik High ft. Cho Won Sun of Rollercoaster	362,592
November 1	"Happen Ending" (헤픈엔딩)	Epik High ft. Cho Won Sun of Rollercoaster	152,663
November 8	"Miss Me or Diss Me" (내가 그리웠니)	MC Mong ft. Jinsil of Mad Soul Child	403,269
November 15	"I'm Different" (나는 달라)	Hi Suhyun ft. Bobby	273,016
November 22	"Three of Us" (세 사람)	Toy ft. Sung Si-kyung	331,170
November 29	"Happy Together"	Park Hyo-shin	334,508
December 6	"Don't Forget" (잊지 말기로 해)	Sung Si-kyung & Kwon Jin-ah	219,817
December 13	"I Want to Fall in Love" (사랑에 빠지고 싶다)	Jung Seung-hwan	207,674
December 20	"I Want to Fall in Love" (사랑에 빠지고 싶다)	Jung Seung-hwan	88,226
December 27	"December, 2014 (The Winter's Tale)"	Exo	99,538

== Monthly charts ==
Source: Gaon Monthly Digital Chart
Month	Song	Artist	Total Downloads – Streams	Ref
January	"Something"	Girl's Day	661,811 – 16,483,368	
February	"Some" (Korean: 썸) †	Soyou & Junggigo	843,839 – 20,705,232	
March	"Come Back Home"	2NE1	547,474 – 19,255,908	
April	"200%"	Akdong Musician	791,216 – 21,180,840	
May	"The Lone Duckling" (Korean: 미운 오리 새끼)	g.o.d.	679,892 – 17,490,054	
June	"Eyes, Nose, Lips" (Korean: 눈,코,입)	Taeyang	765,833 – 21,786,190	
July	"A Midsummer Night's Sweetness" (Korean: 한여름밤의 꿀)	San E, Raina	421,426 – 21,054,828	
August	"Beautiful" (Korean: 예뻐졌다)	Park Boram ft. Zico	552,772 – 15,879,444	
September	"Can't Go to Shinchon" (Korean: 신촌을 못가)	Postmen	511,014 – 17,187,871	
October	"How I Am" (Korean: 그게나야)	Kim Dong-ryool	668,193 – 18,409,999	
November	"Miss Me Or Diss Me" (Korean: 내가 그리웠니)	MC Mong ft. Jinsil of Mad Soul Child	614,383 – 19,965,538	
December	"Luv"	A Pink	349,328 – 17,993,189	

== See also ==
- 2013 in South Korean music
