= MC Mong discography =

- Studio albums: 9
- Extended plays: 1
- Compilation albums: 1
- Singles: 16
- Music videos: 19
- Digital singles: 2
- Collaborations: 15

The discography of South Korean artist MC Mong consists of nine studio albums, one compilation album, one extended play (EP), sixteen singles (including two digital singles), and fifteen collaborations with other artists.

== Albums ==
=== Studio albums ===
Title	Album details	Peak chart positions		Sales
Title	Album details	KOR RIAK	KOR Gaon	Sales
180 Degree	Released: April 23, 2004; Label: M.A Wilddog Entertainment; Format: CD, cassette, digital download	17	—	KOR: 53,649
His Story	Released: May 14, 2005; Label: M.A Wilddog Entertainment; Format: CD, cassette, digital download	11	—	KOR: 114,619
The Way I Am	Released: September 25, 2006; Label: Fantom Entertainment; Format: CD, cassette, digital download	3	—	KOR: 47,210
Show's Just Begun	Released: April 17, 2008; Label: Fantom Entertainment; Format: CD, digital download	12	—	KOR: 86,644
Humanimal	Released: July 23, 2009; Label: M.A Wilddog Entertainment, Mnet Media; Format: CD, digital download; Track listing: 1. Intro; 2. Indian Boy (feat. Jang-geun, B.I); 3. JFAR (Juliet's Father Who's Against Romeo) (feat. Simon (DMTN)); 4. The Truth Even In Heaven (feat. Kim Hee-sun); 5. Words More Beautiful Than Love (feat. Sookhee); 6. Dalmatian Love; 7. Lucky Man; 8. Love Is; 9. Love You Even When I Die 2 (feat. Jo Sung-mo); 10. Little Sunshine (feat. Jung-in); 11. The Saddest Poem In The World (feat. MAC); 12. Luv D.N.A (feat. Navi); 13. Hottrack (feat. B.S); 14. Outro	—N/a	—	
Miss Me or Diss Me	Released: November 3, 2014; Label: Wellmade Yedang, DreamT Entertainment; Format: CD, digital download; Track listing: 1. Greatest Time (feat. Huh Gak); 2. Miss Me Or Diss Me (feat. Jinsil (Mad Soul Child)); 3. Be Strong (feat. Ailee); 4. New York (feat. Baek Ji-young); 5. Run Away (feat. Lyn); 6. Broken Fan (feat. Gary, Hyolyn (Sistar)); 7. What Could I Do (feat. Bumkey); 8. Scandal (feat. The Channels); 9. 0904; 10. Pain Near Death Part.2 (feat. Sweden Laundry); 11. Whatever (feat. Minah (Girl's Day)); 12. My Love (feat. Seong You-jin); 13. E.R (feat. The Channels)	—N/a	2	KOR: 8,815
U.F.O	Released: November 2, 2016; Label: Wellmade Yedang, DreamT Entertainment; Format: CD, digital download; Track listing: 1. Black Hole (feat. Ailee); 2. Visual Gangster (feat. Jung Eun-ji (Apink)); 3. Tears (feat. Darin (Highcolor)); 4. Give Me A Bite of Your Chocolate Lips (feat. Lee Bada); 5. And You (feat. Highcolor (Chanmi, New-A)); 6. Flower (feat. Kim Tae-woo (g.o.d)); 7. Chemistry (feat. Eunha (GFriend)); 8. U.F.O (feat. Suran, Woo Tae-woon, Penomeco); 9. I Can't Do Everything (feat. Babylon); 10. Show's Just Begun (TAK Mashup); 11. Ringing Ringing At Dawn (feat. Park Bo-ram); 12. Black Hole (inst.); 13. Visual Gangster (inst.)	—N/a	59	KOR: 1,485
Channel 8	Released: October 25, 2019; Label: Million Market; Format: CD, digital download; Track listing: 1. Intro; 2. Fame (feat. Song Ga-in, Chancellor); 3. Chanel (feat. Park Bom); 4. Desert Island (feat. MOON); 5. Greatest Time Part.2 (feat. Yang Da-il); 6. Temperature (feat. Suran); 7. I Know (feat. Hynn); 8. Jonber (feat. Coogie, Jiselle); 9. Temperature (Acoustic Ver.) (feat. Suran); 10. Fame (inst.); 11. Blind (Cookie Ver.)	—N/a	41	KOR: 1,515
Flower 9	Released: March 2, 2021; Label: Million Market; Format: CD, digital download; Track listing: 1. Myosotis (feat. Shin Yong-jae (2F)); 2. Blind; 3. There Can't Be A Good Breakup (feat. Jo Hyun-ah (Urban Zakapa)); 4. Star (feat. Chancellor, D.Ark); 5. A Resting Place (feat. Kim Young-heum); 6. Can I Go Back (feat. Kim Se-jeong); 7. Hwa-byung; 8. Turtle (Remix Ver.) (feat. Hyolyn); 9. Cold (Piano Ver.) (feat. Kim Jae-hwan); 10. Blind (inst.)	—N/a	59	—N/a
"—" denotes releases that did not chart.

=== Compilation albums ===
Title	Album details
Best of Best: Red Hot + Cool 2004–1998 New Arrival (MC Mong & People Crew)	Released: May 14, 2004; Label: M.A Wilddog Entertainment; Format: CD, digital download

== EPs ==
Title	Details	Peak chart positions	Sales
Title	Details	KOR Gaon	Sales
Song For You	Released: March 2, 2015; Label: Wellmade Yedang, DreamT Entertainment; Format: CD, digital download	9	KOR: 2,054

== Singles ==
Title	Year	Peak chart positions	Sales	Album
Title	Year	KOR	Sales	Album
"180°"	2004	—		180 Degree
"Because I'm a Man" (그래도 남자니까)	2004	—		180 Degree
"Invincible" (천하무적)	2005	—		His Story
"I Love U, Oh Thank U" (feat. Kim Tae-woo)	2005	—		His Story
"Invincible! Shoot Dori!" (천하무적! 슛돌이!)	2006	—		Non-album single
"Ice Cream"	2006	—		The Way I Am
"So Fresh" (feat. Kim Tae-woo)	2007	—		Non-album single
"Circus" (feat. Lim Yook-yung, $howgun)	2008	—		Show's Just Begun
"Feel Crazy" (미치겠어) (feat. M.A.C)	2008	—		Show's Just Begun
"Indian Boy" (feat. Jang-geun, B.I)	2009	—		Humanimal
"Horror Show" (feat. Kang Ho-dong, Whale)	2009	—		Humanimal
"I Am..." (나는...) (feat. Ivy)	2009	92		Humanimal
"Bubble Love" (with Seo In-young)	2010	3	KOR: 1,243,020	Cho Young Soo All Star 2.5
"Sick Enough to Die" (죽을만큼 아파서) (feat. Mellow)	2010	1	KOR: 2,698,185	Blue Brand Part 2: Trauma
"Miss Me or Diss Me" (내가 그리웠니) (feat. Jinsil of Mad Soul Child)	2014	1	KOR: 1,007,367	Miss Me or Diss Me
"Be Strong" (마음 단단히 먹어) (feat. Ailee)	2014	4	KOR: 517,911	Miss Me or Diss Me
"Run Away" (도망가자) (feat. Lyn)	2014	5	KOR: 500,672	Miss Me or Diss Me
"Love Mash" (사랑 범벅) (feat. Chancellor of The Channels)	2015	1	KOR: 825,972	Song For You
"Like Nobody Knows" (아무도 모르게)	2015	12	KOR: 137,966	Like Nobody Knows
"Black Hole" (블랙홀) (feat. Ailee)	2016	16	KOR: 173,367	U.F.O
"Visual Gangster" (널 너무 사랑해서) (feat. Jung Eun-ji)	2016	5	KOR: 413,072	U.F.O
"Band-Aid" (반창고) (with Huh Gak)	2017	22	KOR: 108,931	Non-album single
"Fame" (인기) (feat. Song Ga-in and Chancellor)	2019	1		Channel 8
"Chanel" (샤넬) (feat. Park Bom)	2019	6		Channel 8
"Cold" (봄 같던 그녀가 춥대) (with Kim Jae-hwan, feat. Penomeco)	2020	35		Non-album single
"Blind" (눈이 멀었다)	2021	68		Flower 9
"There Can't Be A Good Breakup" (좋은 이별이 있을 리가 없잖아) (feat. Jo Hyun-ah of Urban Zakapa)	2021	31		Flower 9
"—" denotes releases that did not chart or were not released in that region. Note: Gaon Chart was established in February 2010. Releases before this date have no chart data.

== Other charted songs ==
Title	Year	Peak chart positions	Album
Title	Year	KOR	Album
"Greatest Time" (feat. Huh Gak)	2014	2	Miss Me or Diss Me
"New York" (feat. Baek Ji-young)	2014	6	Miss Me or Diss Me
"Broken Fan" (feat. Gary, Hyolyn)	2014	7	Miss Me or Diss Me
"What Could I Do" (feat. Bumkey)	2014	9	Miss Me or Diss Me
"Scandal" (feat. The Channels)	2014	10	Miss Me or Diss Me
"0904"	2014	14	Miss Me or Diss Me
"Pain Near Death Part 2" (feat. Sweden Laundry)	2014	3	Miss Me or Diss Me
"Whatever" (feat. Minah)	2014	8	Miss Me or Diss Me
"My Love" (feat. Seong You-jin)	2014	11	Miss Me or Diss Me
"E.R" (feat. The Channels)	2014	15	Miss Me or Diss Me
"Bored Addiction" (feat. Sunwoo Jung-a)	2015	8	Song For You
"The White" (feat. Richard Parkers)	2015	19	Song For You
"Doom Doom (Daishi Dance Track)"	2015	34	Song For You
"Tears" (feat. Darin of Highcolor)	2016	35	U.F.O
"Give Me A Bite of Your Chocolate Lips" (feat. Lee Bada)	2016	57	U.F.O
"And You" (feat. Chanmi, New-A of Highcolor)	2016	82	U.F.O
"Flower" (feat. Kim Tae-woo)	2016	50	U.F.O
"Chemistry" (feat. Eunha of GFriend)	2016	62	U.F.O
"I Can't Do Everything" (feat. Babylon)	2016	90	U.F.O
"Ringing Ringing At Dawn" (feat. Park Bo-ram)	2016	78	U.F.O
"Desert Island" (feat. MOON)	2019	67	Channel 8
"Greatest Time Part.2" (feat. Yang Da-il)	2019	17	Channel 8
"Temperature" (feat. Suran)	2019	49	Channel 8
"I Know" (feat. Hynn)	2019	79	Channel 8
"Jonber" (feat. Coogie, Jiselle)	2019	83	Channel 8
"Myosotis" (feat. Shin Yong-jae (2F))	2021	99	Flower 9
"Star" (feat. Chancellor, D.Ark)	2021	128	Flower 9
"A Resting Place" (feat. Kim Young-heum)	2021	137	Flower 9
"Can I Go Back" (feat. Kim Se-jeong)	2021	118	Flower 9
"Hwa-byung"	2021	195	Flower 9
"Turtle (Remix Ver.)" (feat. Hyolyn)	2021	124	Flower 9

== Others works ==
Artist	Album Information	Track
Haha	The Beautiful Rhyme Diary: Released: February 19, 2005	18. Disrespect You (ft. MC Mong)
Han Kyung Il	B.O.Y.: Because Of You: Released: January 18, 2006	4. My Lover (ft. MC Mong)
Byul	Lachrymal Glands: Released: February 6, 2006	3. 괜찮은 오늘 (Today is Alright) (ft. MC Mong)
Brown Eyed Girls	Vol. 1 - Your Story: Released: August 30, 2006	3. Far Away (ft. MC Mong)
Kim Tae-woo	Vol. 1 - Solo Special: Released: October 28, 2006	6. I Love U Oh Thank U (ft. MC Mong)
Leo Kekoa	Ill Skill: Released: February 13, 2007	6. Hot Buda 82.2 (ft. MC Mong)
Kim Dong Wan	Kimdongwan is: Released: July 9, 2007	6. 삼총사 (Three Musketeers) (ft. MC Mong, Ho In Chang)
Eru	Eru Digital Single Album: Released: March 28, 2008	5. Last Concert (ft. Mithra of Epik High, Brian of Fly to the Sky & MC Mong)
K.Will	Mini Album - Love 119: Released: December 2, 2008	1. Love 119 (ft. MC Mong)
Lyn	Digital Single - Charm: Released: December 4, 2008	1. Charm (ft. MC Mong)
Various Artists	Blue Brand Part 1: 12 Doors: Released: April 17, 2009	1. Simple Love (MC Mong ft. Navi)
Various Artists	OST Part 2 - Invincible: Lee Pyung Kang: Released: November 9, 2009	1. 나란 남자 (Who's The Man) (MC Mong ft. MayBee)
KCM	Digital Single - Color Flower: Released: February 9, 2010	1. 꽃을 든 남자 (Man with a Flower) (ft. MC Mong)
NS Yoon-G	Sincerely: Released: March 20, 2015	1. Wifey (ft. MC Mong)

== Music videos ==
Title	Year
"180°"	2004
"Letter to You"	2004
"Because I'm a Man"	2004
"Invincible"	2005
"I Love U Oh Thank U"	2005
"Chun Ha Moo Juk! Shoot Dori!"	2006
"Ice Cream"	2006
"Circus"	2008
"Feel Crazy"	2008
"Love You 'Till Death"	2008
"Indian Boy"	2009
"Horror Show"	2009
"I Am..."	2009
"Bubble Love"	2010
"Sick Enough to Die"	2010
"Miss Me Or Diss Me"	2014
"Love Mash"	2015
"Visual Gangster"	2016
"Tears"	2016
"Fame"	2019
"Desert Island"	2019
