= Everyday II =

EP by Girl's Day
- Released: April 18, 2012
- Genre: K-pop; Dance; Ballad
- Length: 15:34
- Language: Korean
- Label: Dream T Entertainment, LOEN Entertainment

Girl's Day chronology
| Everyday (2011) | Everyday II (2012) | Expectation (2013) |

Singles from Everyday II
- 1. "Don't Flirt" Released: September 2, 2011; 2. "Oh! My God" Released: April 18, 2012

'Everyday II' is the third extended play by the South Korean girl group Girl's Day. It was released on April 18, 2012.

== Track listing ==
The tracks are as follows:

| No. | Title | Length |
|---|---|---|
| 1. | "Two of Us" | 3:02 |
| 2. | "Oh! My God" | 3:09 |
| 3. | "Don't Flirt" | 3:08 |
| 4. | "Telepathy" | 3:08 |
| 5. | "Oh! My God (Instrumental)" | 3:07 |
