= I Miss You (EP) =

EP by Girl's Day
- Released: October 15, 2014
- Recorded: 2013–2014
- Genre: K-pop, R&B
- Length: 19:13
- Label: Dream Tea Entertainment
- Producer: Duble Sidekick

Girl's Day chronology
Girl's Day Everyday 4 (2014)	I Miss You (2014)	Best Album (2014)

Singles from I Miss You
- 1. "I Miss You" Released: October 15, 2014

I Miss You (Korean: 보고싶어; RR: Bogosipeo) is the first special (third overall) mini album by the South Korean girl group Girl's Day. It was released on October 15, 2014 with the song of the same name used as title track for the album.

== Background ==
Dream Tea Entertainment announced on October 2, 2014, that the group would be releasing a ballad song in the middle of October. The song was produced by Duble Sidekick, who had worked with the group for "Something" and "Darling".

On October 8, 2014, the group's agency revealed that the album would be released in the form of a smart card, touted as a world first. The card would include the title track along with four previously released songs and would require a near field communication (NFC) capable smartphone to access the content through Kihno.

The music video for the lead track was released on October 15, 2014.

== Promotions and release ==
Girl's Day announced that they would not be promoting "I Miss You" on the weekly music shows.

== Track listing ==
Tracklist
No.	Title	Lyrics	Music	Length
1.	"I Miss You" (보고싶어; Bogosipeo)	Duble Sidekick	Duble Sidekick	3:37
2.	"Look at Me"	Duble Sidekick, Tenjo, Tasko	Duble Sidekick, Tenjo, Tasko	3:40
3.	"Show You"	Duble Sidekick	Duble Sidekick	4:01
4.	"I Don't Mind"	Girl's Day, Kang Jeon-myung	Gregg Pagani, 1023Productions	4:48
5.	"White Day"	Nam Ki-sang, Daniel R.	Nam Ki-sang, Radio Galaxy	3:07
Total length:				19:13

== Chart performance ==
=== Singles chart ===
Title	Peak positions
Title	KOR
"I Miss You"	4

== Release history ==
Region	Date	Format	Label
South Korea	October 15, 2014	Smart card	Kihno
South Korea	October 15, 2014	Digital download	Dream Tea Entertainment, LOEN Entertainment
Worldwide	October 15, 2014	Digital download	Dream Tea Entertainment, LOEN Entertainment

== Credits and personnel ==
- Sojin – vocals
- Yura – vocals, rap
- Minah – vocals
- Hyeri – vocals
- Duble Sidekick – producing, songwriting, arranger, music
