= Park So-jin =

South Korean singer and actress (born 1986)

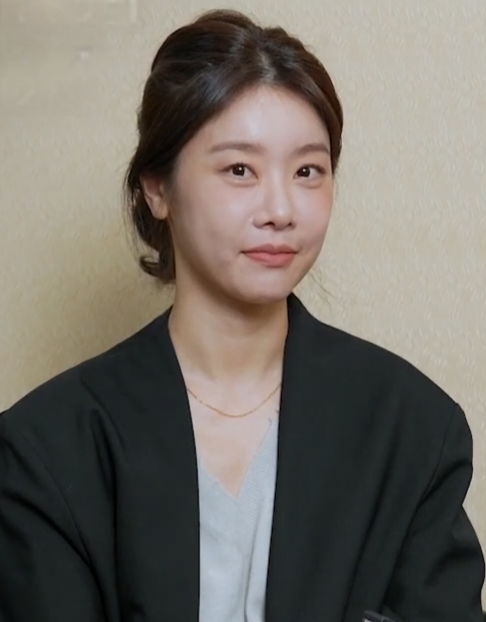
- Park in August 2024
- Born: May 21, 1986 (age 40); Daegu, South Korea
- Education: Yeungnam University
- Occupations: Singer; actress
- Agent: Noon Company
- Spouse: Lee Dong-ha (m. 2023)
- Musical career
- Genre: K-pop
- Instrument: Vocals
- Years active: 2010–present
- Label: Dream T
- Member of: Girl's Day

Korean name
- Hangul: 박소진
- Hanja: 朴素珍
- RR: Bak Sojin
- MR: Pak Sojin

Park So-jin (born May 21, 1986), better known mononymously as Sojin, is a South Korean singer and actress. She is best known as the leader of South Korean girl group Girl's Day.

== Early life and education ==
Park So-jin was born on May 21, 1986, in Seo-gu, Daegu, South Korea. She attended Lee Hyun Elementary School, Seojin Middle School and Kyungduk Girls' High School. She majored in mechanical engineering at Yeungnam University.

== Career ==
=== Pre-debut ===
Prior to her debut, Sojin worked as a vocal trainer for the K-pop boy band Ulala Session.

=== 2010–2012: Debut, Flames of Desire OST and songwriting ===
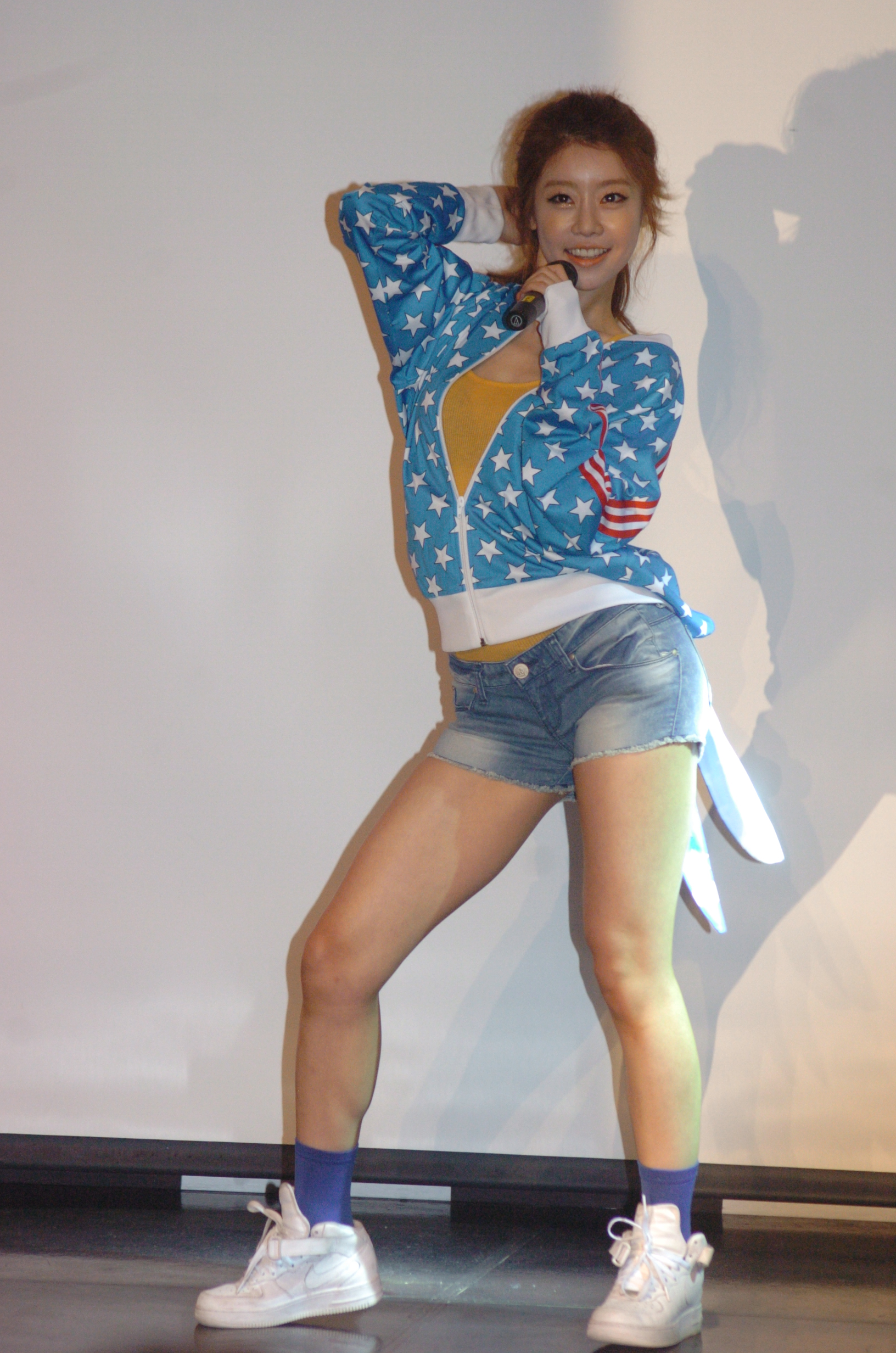
Park performing in 2012

On July 7, 2010, Sojin debuted as a member of Girl's Day on KBS' Music Bank with their debut single, "Tilt My Head" (갸우뚱).

On January 9, 2011, Sojin released her first solo single for the Flames of Desire OST, "Our Love Like This".

On April 19, 2012, Girl's Day made a comeback with the mini album Everyday II. The album included the song "Telepathy", which was composed by Sojin. On the same year, Sojin and a male composer wrote the song "It's Snowing" for Tokyo Girl. The song was later released on December 7.

=== 2013–2016: Collaborations and Family Outing OST ===
On March 14, 2013, Girl's Day released the full-length album Expectation. Sojin wrote the intro song "Girl's Day World", and co-wrote the lyrics for "I Don't Mind" with her fellow members. On October 15, Girl's Day released the song "Let's Go", written and composed by Sojin.

On March 2, 2014, Sojin collaborated with hip hop artist Crucial Star on a remake of Park Hye-kyung's song "Three Things I Want to Give You".

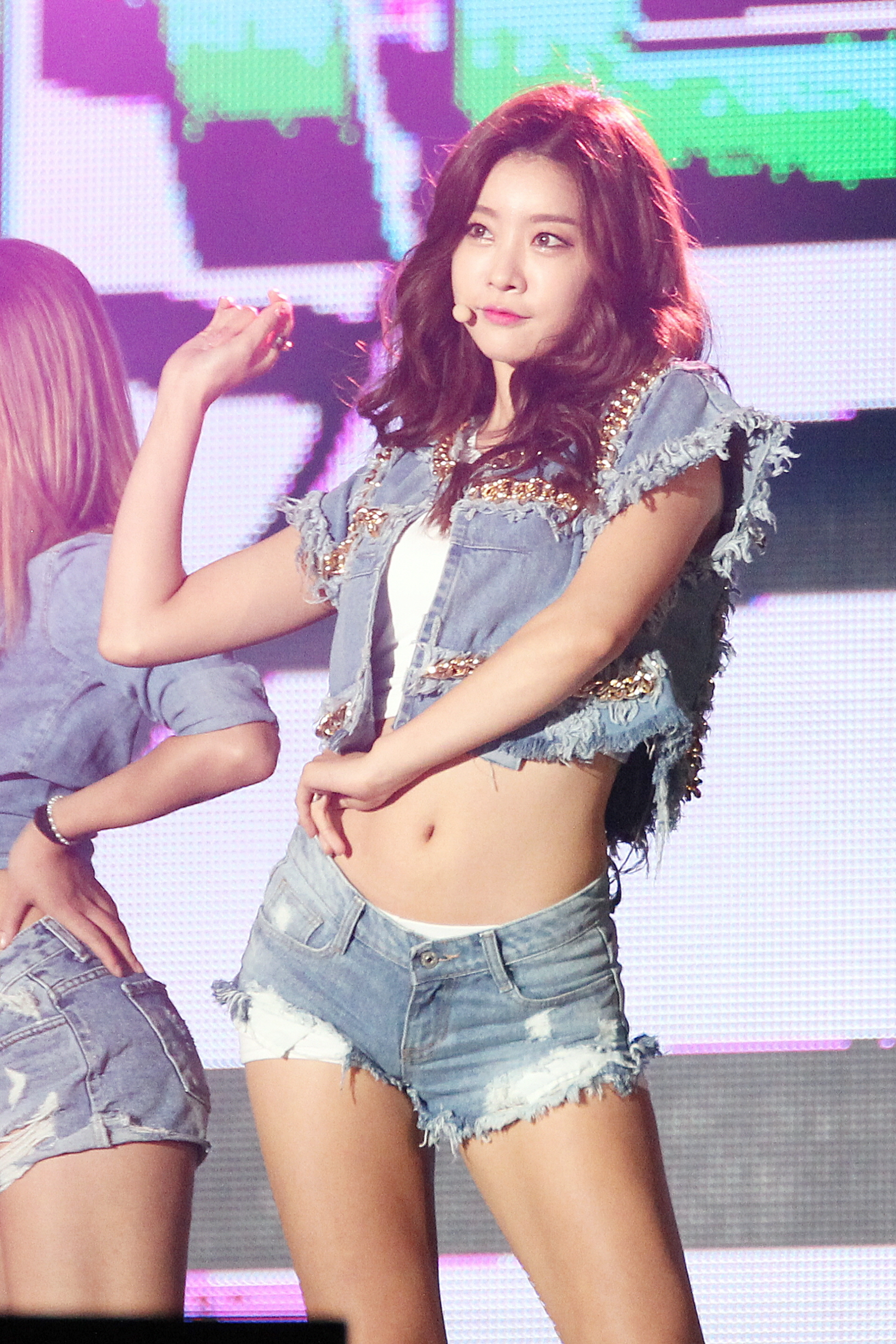
Park performing at the KBS Music Bank Sky Festival in 2015

On January 30, 2015, Sojin lent her voice for "Dizzy Dizzy" for Part 2 of her SBS' weekend drama Family Outing OST.

=== 2017–present: Acting career ===
On June 24, 2020, So-jin has confirmed her appearance in MBC's 'The Spies Who Loved Me', which will be aired in October.

On June 23, 2021, So-jin cast as the drama Alchemy of Souls. On September 15, 2021, So-jin cast as the main in Sh**ting Stars.

On June 17, 2022, So-jin cast as the one act-drama Don't Announce Your Husband's Death as role Yoo Young-joo.

== Personal life ==
=== Relationship ===
On October 6, 2023, Sojin announced on her fan cafe that she will marry actor Lee Dong-ha in November 2023. They married in a private ceremony on November 18 somewhere in Seoul, attended by their close acquaintances and friends of both families.

=== Influence ===
Sojin said that her biggest influence in life is Uhm Jung-hwa. She describes her as a long time leader of her generation who shows abundant expressiveness and depth.

== Filmography ==
=== Film ===
Year	Title	Role	Notes	Ref.
2021	Zombie Crush : Heyri	Kim Ga-yeon		
2021	Ghost Mansion	Seon-hwa		
2021	Tomorrow's Lovers	Son Ae	Short Film	
2022	When Spring Comes	Eun Ok		
2023	Swallow	Eun-mi		
2024	Can we get married?	Kang Hye-young		
2026	Layover Hotel	Min-hee		

=== Television series ===
Year	Title	Role	Notes	Ref.
2011	I Trusted Him		Cameo	
2014	The Greatest Marriage	Lee Yoo-ri		
2015	The Family is Coming	Choi Dong-joo		
2018	Essence of Happiness	Jung-soo		
2019	Vroom Vroom Pegasus Market	Jenny		
2019–2020	Hot Stove League	Kim Yeong-chae		
2020	The King: Eternal Monarch	Jo Hae-In		
2020	The Spies Who Loved Me	Bae Doo-rae		
2022	Shooting Stars	Jo Ki-bum		
2022	Alchemy of Souls	Joo Wol		
2022	O'PENing: "Don't Announce Your Husband's Death"	Yoo Young-joo	One act-drama; season 5	
2022–2023	Alchemy of Souls: Light and Shadow	Joo Wol		
2023	True to Love	Lee Yoo-jeong		
2023	Delightfully Deceitful	Mo Jae-in		
2024	Cinderella at 2 AM	Lee Mi-jin		
2027	Palace Land	Yoon Young-hee		

=== Web series ===
Year	Title	Role	Ref.
2017	Hong Ik Super	Yeon Hee	
2022	May It Please the Court	Jang Yi-yeon	

=== Television show ===
Year	Title	Role	Notes	Ref.
2015	King of Mask Singer	Contestant	"Faux-naif Red Fox" (Episode 7)	
2017	Living Together in Empty Room	Cast member	With Kim Min-jong and Yura (Episode 19–21)	
2017–2019	My Daughter's Men	Host	Season 2–4	

== Theater ==
List of Stage Play(s)
Year	Title		Role	Theater	Date	Ref.
Year	English	Korean	Role	Theater	Date	Ref.
2021	Perfetti Sconosciuti	완벽한 타인	Bianca	Sejong Centre for the Performing Arts M Theatre	May 18 – Aug 1	
2021	Perfetti Sconosciuti	완벽한 타인	Bianca	GS Caltex Yeulmaru Grand Theatre, Yeosu	August 13–14	

== Discography ==
=== Singles ===
Title	Year	Album
As lead artist
"In the Summer" (Sojin feat. Zico)	2013	Deux 20th Anniversary Tribute Album
As featured artist
"Three Things I Want to Give You" (Crucial Star feat. Sojin)	2014	Non-album single
Collaboration
"Finale" (Sojin & Dok2)	2014	Non-album single
"On Rainy Days" (Kim Taebum (Party Street) and Sojin)	2015	Non-album single

=== Soundtrack appearances ===
Title	Year	Album
"Our Love Like This"	2011	Flames of Desire OST
"I Want to Turn Back Time"	2013	Passionate Love OST
"Ajjil Ajjil"	2015	Family Outing OST
"I Am Korea" (With various artists)	2015	I Am Korea theme song
"It Hurts" (Sojin & Zico)	2015	Mask OST
"Everyday With You"	2015	Reply 1988 OST

== Awards and nominations ==
Award ceremony	Year	Category	Nominee / Work	Result	Ref.
MBC Drama Awards	2020	Best New Actress	The Spies Who Loved Me	Nominated	
