= MC Mong =

South Korean rapper (born 1979)

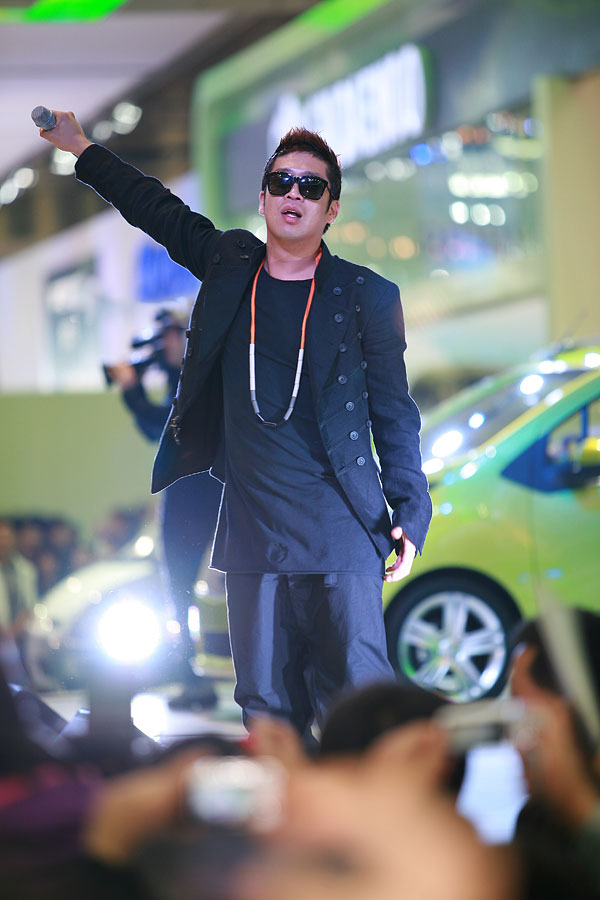
- MC Mong in April 2009
- Born: Shin Dong-hyun; September 4, 1979 (age 47); Seoul, South Korea
- Other names: Mong; Black Edition
- Occupations: Rapper; record producer; radio personality; actor; television personality
- Musical career
- Genre: Hip hop
- Instrument: Vocals
- Years active: 1998–2010; 2014–present
- Labels: IS Entermedia Group; M.A Wilddog; Fantom; Wellmade Yedang; Dream T; Million Market

Korean name
- Hangul: 신동현
- RR: Sin Donghyeon
- MR: Sin Tonghyŏn

Stage name
- Hangul: MC 몽
- RR: MC mong
- MR: MC mong

Shin Dong-hyun (Korean: 신동현; born September 4, 1979), better known by his stage name MC Mong, is a South Korean hip hop recording artist, record producer, radio personality, actor and television personality who is known for his comic disposition and his upbeat songs. He is one of the most commercially successful hip hop artists in Korea. He gained popularity in the early 2000s as an actor on the sitcom, Nonstop, before releasing his debut album, 180 Degree, in 2004. He was also a cast member of the variety show, 2 Days & 1 Night from 2007 to 2010. He was charged in 2010 with draft dodging, after which he was banned from appearing on major Korean broadcast networks. His 2014 comeback album, Miss Me Or Diss Me, topped music charts upon its release.

== Career ==
=== Music and acting debuts ===
MC Mong debuted in 1998 as a member of hip hop group People Crew. Between 1999 and 2002, the group released three albums, titled, Hiphop Spirit Forever, 태산북두, and We Believe We Can Fly, respectively. However, MC Mong's break came not from rapping but from acting, when he appeared on the sitcom Nonstop 4 in 2003. His acting abilities on the show won him mainstream popularity.

In 2004, he made his solo debut as a rapper with the album, 180 Degree. The following year, he released his second album, titled, His Story. In 2005, he also had a role in the TV drama, Sad Love Story.

=== Growing popularity ===
MC Mong's third album, 2006's The Way I Am, showed a more serious side of the rapper, who had become known for his light-hearted image. The track "Secret" deals with his parents' divorce and his poor relationship with his father. The album, which also features guest vocals from Japanese singer Lisa and Korean singers Park Hyo Shin and Ivy, topped the charts after it was released, beating out "big names" like Rain and Se7en.

In 2007, he starred in a live-action TV adaption of the Korean web comic, The Great Catsby. That same year, he began hosting MC Mong's Donggo Dongrak on SBS Radio, and he joined the cast of the popular TV variety show, 2 Days & 1 Night. He was the center of controversy in July 2008, when 2 Days & 1 Night aired a scene showing him smoking. The show publicly apologized for not editing out the scene, as all major Korean broadcasting stations had agreed in 2004 not to air smoking scenes before midnight.

MC Mong released his fourth album, Show's Just Begun, in 2008. The album's first single, "Circus," was immensely popular, winning the number one spot five weeks in a row on the TV music countdown show, Music Bank. He followed up "Circus," with the single, "Feel Crazy."

In 2009, he released his fifth album, Humanimal. Pre-order sales of the album reached over 55,000 copies, and the album's tracks topped numerous music charts shortly after they were released. MC Mong wrote the single, "Jin Shil, Even If You're in Heaven," for the late actress Choi Jin-sil, who had committed suicide the year before. MC Mong's management company said that sales for this single would be donated to charity.

=== Hiatus and comeback ===
In 2010, MC Mong's career was put on hold when he was accused of evading South Korea's mandatory military service by having healthy teeth extracted to gain exemption. He was ultimately sentenced to a suspended six-month jail term for dodging conscription. Following his sentence, two major TV networks, the Korean Broadcasting System and Munhwa Broadcasting Corporation, banned MC Mong from appearing on their programs.

He made his comeback in 2014 with the album, Miss Me Or Diss Me, which topped nine Korean music charts shortly after its release. Despite the album's popularity, MC Mong also received backlash from members of the public who were still angered over his alleged draft dodging.

In 2015, he held his first concert in six years. He also released the single, "Love Jumble," from EP Song For You, which topped music charts after its release.

== Controversies ==
=== Draft dodging controversy ===
In September 2010, allegations regarding MC Mong's mandatory national service prompted the South Korean Military Manpower Administration (병무청) to conduct an investigation. Following public outcry, he stopped all public appearances for several years, including TV programs. According to reporters, one of his dentists publicly stated that he received money from MC Mong to remove two teeth instead of repairing them. MC Mong strongly denied the allegations. On October 10, he was officially charged with violating military service laws by the Seoul Central District Court. At the second trial held on November 29, 2010, after four of MC Mong's dentists came forward to support his case, the fifth (and previously aforementioned) dentist, who originally said he had removed teeth number 46 and 47, changed his statement. He explained that there was a hole in tooth number 46 and he could not know why the hole was there so he extracted it. Tooth number 47 was acutely damaged, so he removed it also. He further explained that MC Mong had not taken good care of his teeth and as such, most of them needed either care or removal. He also said that the police told him to write words such as "forceful" and "intense" in his account, and that he was bothered about this constantly when he did not. He explained that he had never talked to MC Mong about enlistment evasion, that, unlike the reports suggested, he had never received any money from MC Mong for pulling the teeth out, and that the reason he took the teeth out was not from MC Mong's request. The third trial was held on December 20. The fourth, initially scheduled for January 24, 2011, was postponed to February 8.

On April 11, 2011, MC Mong was cleared of intentionally pulling out healthy teeth in order to be exempted from military duty but was sentenced to a suspended jail term of six months, probation for one year, and 120 hours of community service, for deliberately delaying enlistment on false grounds. The court acknowledged that there was a delay in his military enlistment, however, they were unable to determine whether he was guilty for extracting teeth for the purpose of avoiding his military draft.

=== Homophobic comments ===
In 2004, MC Mong attracted controversy for making homophobic comments during an interview on the television show Most Wanted. In the interview, he said that if gun ownership were legalised in South Korea, gay people should be shot dead, adding, "The Bible clearly states that [homosexuality] is a sin". The show's production team edited the remarks out. The incident drew widespread online backlash, and LGBT rights groups demanded Mong apologise. Mong's agency stated in response that Mong had been sexually assaulted by a gay person in the past, and that his comments were solely about the perpetrator.

=== Violation of foreign exchange laws ===
In March 2022, MC Mong was caught trying to leave the country carrying $70,000 in cash, which he had not reported to customs. This was in violation of the Foreign Exchange Transactions Act, which states that amounts exceeding $10,000 must be reported to the relevant customs office when entering or leaving the country. MC Mong's agency responded that he had intended to report the money, but was distracted and forgot.

=== Ignoring court summons ===
In February 2024, MC Mong was fined three million won for refusing to appear as a witness in a fraud case involving golfer Ahn Sung-hyun. Ahn had planned to acquire a 5% stake in Mong's company, BPM Entertainment, using investment provided by Kang Jong-hyun, another defendant in the case. Kang accused Ahn of failing to return the money when the investment was cancelled. Mong, described as a "key witness", was summoned by the court on three occasions, but refused to appear each time, changing his phone number to avoid being contacted. The judge threatened to issue a warrant for his arrest if he did not comply. Mong subsequently attended the trial, where he denied having any knowledge of the transactions between Ahn and Kang, and the court cancelled the fine.

== Philanthropy ==
On February 10, 2023, MC Mong donated 100 million won to help 2023 Turkey–Syria earthquake, by donating money through Hope Bridge National Disaster Relief Association.

== Discography ==
- 180 Degree (2004)
- His Story (2005)
- The Way I Am (2006)
- Show's Just Begun (2008)
- Humanimal (2009)
- Miss Me Or Diss Me (2014)
- U.F.O (2016)
- Channel 8 (2019)
- Flower 9 (2021)

== Filmography ==
=== Television series ===
Year	Title	Role	Ref.
2003–2004	Nonstop 4		
2005	Sad Love Story	Jang Jin-pyo	
2007	The Great Catsby	Catsby	

=== Television variety ===
Year	Title	Ref.
2007–2010	2 Days & 1 Night	
2008–2009	Ya Shim Man Man 2	
2009	Dr Mong Goes to School	
2009–2010	SNSD's Hello Baby	
2010	HahaMong Show	
2015	Unpretty Rapstar	

=== Film ===
Year	Title	Role	Ref.
2003	Deus Machina		
2006	Riverbank Legends		
2007	Myodo Wild Flower		
2008	Space Chimps	Ham III	

=== Radio ===
Year	Title	Ref.
2003–2004	Haha & Mong's Young Street	
2007–2008	MC Mong's Donggo Dongrak	

== Awards and nominations ==
Award	Year	Category	Nominee / Nominated work	Result	Ref.
Cyworld Digital Music Awards	2007	Song of the Month (July)	"So Fresh" (featuring Kim Tae-woo)	Won	
Cyworld Digital Music Awards	2009	Best 10 Award	"Indian Boy"	Won	
Cyworld Digital Music Awards	2010	Song of the Month (March)	"Bubble Love" (with Seo In-young)	Won	
Gaon Chart Music Awards	2014	Artist of the Year in Digital Music (November)	MC Mong	Won	
Gaon Chart Music Awards	2015	Artist of the Year in Digital Music (March)	MC Mong	Won	
Gaon Chart Music Awards	2019	Artist of the Year in Digital Music (October)	MC Mong	Won	
Golden Disc Awards	2005	Album Bonsang	His Story	Won	
Golden Disc Awards	2006	Best Hip Hop Award	"Ice Cream"	Won	
Golden Disc Awards	2008	Digital Bonsang	"Circus"	Won	
KBS Music Awards	2004	Singer of the Year (Bonsang)	MC Mong	Won	
KBS Music Awards	2005	Singer of the Year (Bonsang)	MC Mong	Won	
KBS Music Awards	2005	Best Lyricist Award	MC Mong	Won	
MAMA Awards	2004	Best Male Video	"180°"	Nominated	
MAMA Awards	2005	Digital Popularity Award	"Invincible"	Won	
MAMA Awards	2005	Best Male Artist	"Invincible"	Nominated	
MAMA Awards	2006	Best Hip Hop Performance	"Ice Cream"	Won	
MAMA Awards	2008	Best Male Artist	"Circus"	Nominated	
MAMA Awards	2008	Best Hip Hop Performance	"Circus"	Nominated	
MAMA Awards	2009	Best Male Artist	"Indian Boy"	Nominated	
MAMA Awards	2010	Best Digital Single	"Sick Enough to Die" (featuring Mellow)	Nominated	
MBC Entertainment Awards	2003	PD's Award	MC Mong	Won	
MBC Entertainment Awards	2004	PD's Award	MC Mong	Won	
Seoul Music Awards	2006	Main Prize (Bonsang)	MC Mong	Won	

== See also ==
- MC Mong discography
- 2 Days & 1 Night
