= The Apartment Is Beautiful =

- Drama Stage episode
- Official poster
- Episode no.: Season 5 Episode 7
- Directed by: Jo Eun-sol
- Written by: Lee Yi-young
- Original air date: July 1, 2022
- Hangul: 아파트는 아름다워
- RR: Apateuneun areumdawo
- MR: Ap'at'ŭnŭn arŭmdawŏ

Episode chronology
← Previous "Don't Announce Your Husband's Death"	Next → "How to Distinguish Voices"

"The Apartment Is Beautiful" (Korean: 아파트는 아름다워; RR: Apateuneun areumdawo) is the seventh episode of the fifth season of the South Korean anthology series Drama Stage. Directed by Jo Eun-sol and produced by Studio Dragon and Fantagio, it stars Park Hyo-joo and Seo Young-hee. This drama is story of the protagonist who won the lease confronts 'unbeautiful neighbors' in the 'beautiful apartment' in her own way. The episode was aired on tvN on July 1, 2022, at 12:10 (KST).

== Cast ==
=== Main ===
- Park Hyo-joo as Seo Hee-jae

In late 30s, artist, The Shenu, Building 201, Room 1401

- Seo Young-hee as Moon Se-yeon

In late 30s, Sociology Professor, The Shenu, Building 201, Room 1604

- Hwang Sun-hwa as Choi Eun-joo

In late 30s, N Job, The Shenu 101, Room 505

- Kim Gyu-na as Ha Seung-yoon

8 years old, Hee-jae's daughter

- Kim Ji-yu as Kim Ah-jeong

8 years old, Se-yeon's daughter

- Koh Dong-ha as Park Joon-hee

8 years old, Eun-ju's son

- Kwon Hyuk as Ha Young-seok

In early 30s, Heejae's husband, documentary director

- Yoon Byung-hee as Gil Joo-nam

In mid 40s, Small and Medium Business Manager

=== Others ===
- Kim Dae-ryeong as Kim Wang-cheol

In 40s, Se-yeon's husband

- Ryu Ye-ri as Eun Jeong-hyeon

In 30s, Hee-jae's classmate

- Kim Ji-hwan as Oh Jae-hyeong

8 years old

- Lee Cho-ah as Mo Jae-hyeong

In 30s

- Kim Shin-yong as Principal

In 50s

- Joo-hyun as Gallery CEO

40 big

== Production ==
The one-act play is produced by Studio Dragon and Fantagio with the lead cast consisting of Park Hyo-joo, Seo Young-hee, Hwang Seon-hwa, Kwon Hyuk, and Yoon Byung-hee.

== Original soundtrack ==
The Apartment Is Beautiful

Soundtrack album by Haze Moon
- Released: 2022
- Genre: Soundtrack
- Languages: Korean; English
- Labels: Genie Music; Stone Music Entertainment

Released on July 2, 2022
No.	Title	Lyrics	Music	Artist	Length
1.	"Hello" (안녕)	Han Jae-Wan, Oh Ji-Eun, Flum3n	Han Jae-Wan, Oh Ji-Eun, Flum3n	Haze Moon	3:50
2.	"Hello" (inst.)				3:50

== Ratings ==
Average TV viewership ratings
Original broadcast date	Average audience share (Nielsen Korea)
Original broadcast date	Nationwide
July 1, 2022	0.945%
