= The Lone Duckling =

Single by g.o.d

from the album Chapter 8
- Language: Korean
- Released: May 7, 2014
- Genre: R&B
- Length: 4:24
- Label: CJ E&M
- Composer: Duble Sidekick
- Lyricists: Duble Sidekick, Danny Ahn

single
- The Lone Duckling on YouTube

"The Lone Duckling" (Korean: 미운오리새끼; RR: Miun orisaekki) is a song by South Korean pop music group g.o.d and released on May 7, 2014, as a teaser for their comeback and reunion to celebrate fifteen years since their debut in 1999. It was their first release since going on hiatus in December 2005.

== Overview ==
The song is categorized as a ballad and was written and composed by Duble Sidekick, with the rap composed by Danny Ahn. Billboard describes the song as having "classic boy band harmonies with modern-day electronic elements for a hit that boasts a hint of nostalgia for old-school fans".

The title is a reference to the story of "The Ugly Duckling". The lyrics are sung from the perspective of an observer watching the duckling "crying" alone and likening one's own personal struggles to that of the duckling.

== Track listing ==
- Digital download
1. "The Lone Duckling" – 4:24
2. "The Lone Duckling" (instrumental) – 4:24

== Release and reception ==
Despite being a pre-release for the upcoming eighth album, the single achieved what is known in the industry as an "all-kill", topping ten online music websites within 24 hours its release and temporarily displacing popular boy band EXO in the #1 spot on the Gaon Charts. It peaked at #1 on Billboard's Korea K-Pop Hot 100 and remained in the Top 30 for five consecutive weeks until the chart was discontinued in early July. The single finished second in the Inkigayo rankings for May 18 despite g.o.d not promoting the song at any music programs or being present at the show. Based on data compiled by the Gaon Music Chart it was the top-selling single for the month of May and remained in the top 50 for nine consecutive weeks. The first and only time g.o.d have performed the song as a quintet on a televised program was their appearance on You Hee-yeol's Sketchbook in September 2014.

As the single was intended to raise funds for victims of the Sewol ferry disaster, a music video was not made and the YouTube video uploaded by label CJ E&M only contains a screenshot of the group's logo and the song title. The video still garnered over a million views and was eighth most watched (internationally) K-pop music video in May.

The song was well received by fans and critics, who have noted the meaningful lyrics and "comforting" melody as a welcome respite in a tragic time and also praised group's decision to retain their unique and signature blend of R&B and rap rather than follow the current K-pop trends.

== Charts ==
Country	Chart	Peak position		
Country	Chart	Weekly	Monthly	Yearly
South Korea	Korea K-Pop Hot 100	1	—	—
South Korea	Gaon Digital Chart	1	1	41

== Awards and nominations ==
Year	Award	Category	Result
2014	Golden Disc Awards	Single of the Year (Digital bonsang)	Nominated
2015	Gaon Chart Music Awards	Song of the Year (May)	Won

== See also ==
- List of Korea K-Pop Hot 100 number ones
- List of Gaon Digital Chart number ones of 2014
