= Girl's Day Everyday 5 =

Girl's Day Everyday #5

EP by Girl's Day
- Released: March 27, 2017
- Recorded: 2016–2017
- Genre: K-pop
- Length: 23:51
- Language: Korean
- Labels: Dream Tea Entertainment; LOEN Entertainment

Girl's Day chronology
Love (2015)	Girl's Day Everyday #5 (2017)

Singles from Girl's Day Everyday #5
- 1. "I'll Be Yours" Released: March 27, 2017

Music video
- "I'll Be Yours'" on YouTube

Girl's Day Everyday #5 is the sixth extended play promoted as (seventh) by South Korean girl group Girl's Day. It was released by Dream Tea Entertainment and distributed by Loen Entertainment on March 27, 2017. "I'll Be Yours" was released as the title track from the EP, and was used to promote on several South Korean music programs, including Music Bank and Inkigayo. A music video for the title track was also released on March 27.

It was the last album the group would release under Dream T Entertainment as the group to go on an indefinite hiatus.

== Background and release ==
The EP was released on March 27, 2017, at noon KST through several South Korean music portals, including Melon, and iTunes for the global market.

== Promotion ==
Girl's Day held their first comeback stage on SBS MTV's The Show on March 28, 2017, performing "Love Again" and title track "I'll Be Yours". They continued on MBC Music's Show Champion on March 29, Mnet's M Countdown on March 30, KBS's Music Bank on March 31, MBC's Show! Music Core on April 1 and SBS's Inkigayo on April 2.

== Singles ==
The title track "I'll Be Yours", entered and peaked at number 3 on the Gaon Digital Chart on the chart issue dated March 26 - April 1, 2017. In its second week, the song fell to number 11.

The title track entered at number 76 on the Gaon Digital Chart for the month of March 2017, with 109,375 downloads sold.

== Commercial performance ==
Girl's Day Everyday #5 entered and peaked at number 5 on the Gaon Album Chart on the chart issue dated March 26 - April 1, 2017. In its second week, the EP fell to number 52 and in its third week, the EP rose to number 27. The EP also entered and peaked at number 7 on Billboard's World Albums for the week ending April 15, 2017.

The EP entered at number 15 on the Gaon Album Chart for the month of March 2017, with 8,104 physical copies sold in five days.

== Track listing ==
Digital download
No.	Title	Lyrics	Music	Arrangement	Length
1.	"I'll Be Yours"	Mafly; Oh Yuwon; Yura	Ryan S. Jhun; Emile Ghantous; Denzil Remedios; Keith Hetrick; K NITA; Alicia Stamkos	Denzil Remedios; Ryan S. Jhun	3:10
2.	"Thirsty"	Seo Jieum; Yura	LDN Noise; Alice Sophie Penrose; Carolyn Jordan; Ryan S. Jhun; Jo Miswell	LDN Noise; Alice Sophie Penrose; Carolyn Jordan; Ryan S. Jhun; Jo Miswell	3:06
3.	"Love Again"	Jeongyun	Hyuk Shin	Hyuk Shin	3:47
4.	"Kumbaya (Come by Here)" (Sojin's Solo)	Sojin; Jo Miswell	Daniel Durn; Sebastian Owens; Marcus Elkjer; Natalie Major; Jo Miswell; Ryan S. Jhun	Denzil Remedios; Ryan S. Jhun	4:11
5.	"Truth" (Minah's Solo)	Minah; Mafly	Ryan S. Jhun; David Quinones; Bert Elliot; Jaden Michaels	Ryan S. Jhun; David Quinones; Bert Elliot; Jaden Michaels	3:16
6.	"Don't Be Shy"	Sojin; Mafly	Courtney Jenae; Wondrboy; 999; Chek Parren	999; Chek Parren	3:16
7.	"I'll Be Yours" (Instrumental)		Ryan S. Jhun; Emile Ghantous; Denzil Remedios; Keith Hetrick; K NITA; Alicia Stamkos		3:05
Total length:					23:51

== Charts ==
=== Weekly charts ===
Chart (2017)	Peak position
South Korea (Gaon Album Chart)	5
United States (Billboard's World Albums)	7

=== Monthly charts ===
Chart (2017)	Peak position
South Korea (Gaon Album Chart)	15

== Release history ==
Region	Date	Format	Label
South Korea	March 27, 2017	CD, Digital download	DreamTea Entertainment, Loen Entertainment
Worldwide	March 27, 2017	Digital download	DreamTea Entertainment, Loen Entertainment
