= Don't Announce Your Husband's Death =

- Drama Stage episode
- Official poster
- Episode no.: Season 5 Episode 6
- Directed by: Choi Dong-suk
- Written by: Lim Soo-rim
- Original air date: June 24, 2022
- Hangul: 남편의 죽음을 알리지 마라
- RR: Nampyeonui jugeumeul alliji mara
- MR: Namp'yŏnŭi chugŭmŭl alliji mara

Episode chronology
← Previous "Find the 1st Prize"	Next → "The Apartment Is Beautiful"

"Don't Announce Your Husband's Death" (Korean: 남편의 죽음을 알리지 마라; RR: Nampyeonui jugeumeul alliji mara) is the sixth episode of the fifth season of the South Korean anthology series Drama Stage, produced by Studio Dragon and GTist for tvN. Directed by Choi Dong-suk and starring Kim Nam-hee and Park So-jin, this drama depicts an unprecedented safety pregnancy project that takes place when a man with a 1% chance of pregnancy lies for the safe delivery of a moody pregnant woman who doesn't know where to go. The episode will be aired on tvN on June 24, 2022, at 12:10 (KST).

== Synopsis ==
A man and a woman are unfamiliar with the biological mother and father of a child. The two men and women end up protecting the child in their womb and becoming a better person.

== Cast ==
- Kim Nam-hee as Yoon Jae-young

34 years old, CEO of digital funeral service 'Digital Cleaner'

- Park So-jin as Yoo Young-joo

38 years old, pregnant woman, a badminton player, but she withdrew due to her panic disorder.

- Kim Yoon-seo as Seo Do-yeon

39 years old, head of Content Planning Department, One-Top Study

- Danny Ahn as Chan-beom Yoon

42 years old, Korean language instructor at Denian Admissions Academy One-Top Study

== Original soundtrack ==
Don't Announce Your Husband's Death

Soundtrack album by Jung Yu-bin
- Released: 2022
- Genre: Soundtrack
- Languages: Korean; English
- Labels: Genie Music; Stone Music Entertainment

Released on June 25, 2022
No.	Title	Lyrics	Music	Artist	Length
1.	"Listen"	Goohyun Jung, Aseul	Goohyun Jung	Jung Yu-bin	4:07
2.	"Listen" (inst.)				4:07

== Ratings ==
Average TV viewership ratings
Original broadcast date	Average audience share (Nielsen Korea)
Original broadcast date	Nationwide
June 24, 2022	0.536%
