= Love (Girl's Day album) =

- Physical cover. The digital cover is text-only image with pink background, the group's name, album's title, and the main song's title.

Studio album by Girl's Day
- Released: July 7, 2015
- Recorded: 2013; 2014–2015
- Genre: K-pop; dance-pop
- Label: Dream Tea Entertainment; LOEN Entertainment (Distributor)
- Producer: Duble Sidekick

Girl's Day chronology
| Everyday 4 (2014) | Love (2015) | Girl's Day Everyday #5 (2017) |

Singles from Love
- 1. "Hello Bubble" Released: May 12, 2015; 2. "Ring My Bell" Released: July 7, 2015

Love is the second full-length studio album by South Korean girl group Girl's Day. It was released by Dream Tea Entertainment and distributed by LOEN Entertainment on July 7, 2015. It consists of fourteen songs, including the title track "Ring My Bell", used to promote the album on several music programs, including Music Bank and Inkigayo. A music video for the title track was also released on July 7.

The album was a commercial success peaking at number 3 on the Gaon Album Chart. It has sold over 30,212 physical copies as of December 2015.

== Release and promotion ==
The full album was released on July 7, 2015.

The promotions of the song "Ring My Bell" started on July 6, 2015 on The Show. The song was also promoted on the shows, Show Champion, Music Bank, M! Countdown, Music Core and Inkigayo.

== Commercial performance ==
Love entered and peaked at number 3 on the Gaon Album Chart on the chart issue dated July 5–11, 2015. In its second week, the album fell to number 11 and in its third week to number 37. It spent a total of nine consecutive weeks on the album chart.

The album entered at number 10 on the Gaon Album Chart for the month of July 2015, with 28,499 physical copies sold. It also charted at number 63 for the month of August for a total of 29,207 copies sold. The album charted at number 64 on the Gaon Album Chart for the year-end 2015 with 30,212 physical copies sold.

== Track listing ==
| No. | Title | Lyrics | Music | Arrangement | Length |
|---|---|---|---|---|---|
| 1. | "With Me" | Duble Sidekick, Long Candy | Duble Sidekick, Homeboy, Long Candy | Glory Face | 3:30 |
| 2. | "Ring My Bell" (링마벨) | ₩uNo, Long Candy, THE CHANNELS | Homeboy, Radio Galaxi, Long Candy | Radio Galaxi, eastwest | 3:20 |
| 3. | "Macaron" (마카롱) | Duble Sidekick, Long Candy | Duble Sidekick, Long Candy, Glory Face | Glory Face, 진리 | 3:13 |
| 4. | "Come Slowly" | Seion, Park Jang Geun, David Kim | Long Candy, Seion | Seion | 4:11 |
| 5. | "Top Girl" | 남기상, Daniel R., 강전명 | 남기상, 권선익, 박기현, 정택준 | 정택준, 박기현, 정규성 | 3:48 |
| 6. | "Darling" | Duble Sidekick | Duble Sidekick | Duble Sidekick | 3:15 |
| 7. | "Whistle" (휘파람) | Duble Sidekick | Duble Sidekick, Radio Galaxi | Duble Sidekick, Radio Galaxi | 3:36 |
| 8. | "Look At Me" | Duble Sidekick, David Kim | Duble Sidekick, Tenzo and Tasco | Tenzo and Tasco | 3:43 |
| 9. | "Something" | Duble Sidekick | Duble Sidekick | Duble Sidekick | 3:22 |
| 10. | "Timing" | Duble Sidekick | Duble Sidekick, Radio Galaxi | Duble Sidekick, Radio Galaxi | 3:21 |
| 11. | "I Miss You" (보고싶어) | Duble Sidekick, David Kim, Seion | Duble Sidekick, Seion | Seion | 3:39 |
| 12. | "Show You" | Duble Sidekick, David Kim | Duble Sidekick, Tenzo and Tasco | Tenzo and Tasco | 4:03 |
| 13. | "Hello Bubble" | Duble Sidekick, David Kim | Duble Sidekick, Tenzo and Tasco | Tenzo and Tasco | 3:25 |
| 14. | "Ring My Bell" (Instrumental) | | Homeboy, Radio Galaxi, Long Candy | Radio Galaxi, eastwest | 3:19 |

== Charts ==
| Chart | Peak position |
|---|---|
| Gaon Weekly Album Chart | 3 |
| Gaon Monthly Album Chart | 10 |

=== Sales and certifications ===
| Chart | Amount |
|---|---|
| Gaon physical sales | 40,510 |
