= Dream T Entertainment =

South Korean record label

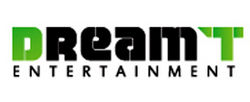
- Native name: 드림티엔터테인먼트
- Industry: Music; Entertainment
- Genre: K-pop
- Founded: July 28, 2009
- Founder: Lee Jong-seok
- Defunct: June 30, 2021
- Headquarters: Seoul, South Korea
- Key people: Park Seong-yeop (CEO)
- Revenue: ₩6,619,520,577 (2014)
- Operating income: ₩2,106,883,362 (2014)
- Net income: ₩1,908,848,437 (2014)
- Owner: Imagine Asia (100%)
- Subsidiaries: YMC Entertainment (41% – since July 2015)
- Website: dreamtenter.com

Dream T Entertainment Co., Ltd. (Korean: 드림티엔터테인먼트) was a South Korean entertainment company established in 2009 by Lee Jong-seok.

In 2013, Imagine Asia became a majority shareholder of Dream T after they acquired 100% of the entire company.

In July 2015, Dream T Entertainment announced that they had acquired 41% of YMC Entertainment's shares along Dream T Entertainment parents company, Imagine Asia also acquired 39% of YMC Entertainment's shares.

On June 30, 2021, Dream T officially shut down.

== Former artists ==
- Girl's Day (2010–2019)
  - Jisun (2010)
  - Jiin (2010)
  - Jihae (2010–2012)
  - Sojin (2010–2019)
  - Yura (2010–2019)
  - Minah (2010–2019)
  - Hyeri (2010–2019)
- Jevice (2012–2014)
- MC Mong (2016–2018)
- MAP6 (2016–2018)
- I'M (2016–2018)
- Ji Hyun-woo (2016–2019)
- Hyang Un-mi
- Lee Ji-an
- Kim Min-jun (2017–2019)
- Baek Seung-heon (2017–2019)
- Hong Soo-ah (2016–2019)

== Filmography ==
- Secrets of Women (KBS2 serial, 2016) (with DK E&M)
