= Bullsone =

Automotive Company

Bullsone (Korean: 불스원) is an automotive products company headquartered in Seoul, Korea.

Its products include total fuel system cleaners, engine oil treatments, car shampoos, car waxes, rain repellents, the wide mirror, and air fresheners.

== Brands ==
- Bullsoneshot, a fuel system cleaner, is the main product of Bullsone.
- Grasse, it is the brand name for luxury car perfume series.
- Rain OK is the brand name for glass care products.
- Crystal and Lunatic are for surface care products.
- BalanceOn is the brand for healthe care products

== Concept ==
Bullsone Co., Ltd. began as an independent entity in 2001, branching off from Oxy Co., Ltd., a leading Korean enterprise. Since then it has developed into Korea's No. 1 auto care products manufacturer. The following are factors that contributed to Bullsone's success: corporate philosophy that gives priority to the trust of customers, competitive spirit that does not accept failure, cultivation of creative minds with a desire to always pursue something new. Bullsone, in particular, has been preparing for a sustainable future by actively developing products based on the idea of low-carbon green growth. As a result, it has laid the foundation to expand its business into the global market and become a global company.

== Products ==
- Engine care
  - Total fuel system cleaner (Bullsoneshot)
  - Oil treatment: Engine coating treatment (Bullspower)
  - Air intake system cleaner
  - Engine degreaser
  - Multi purpose lubricant
  - Antifreeze / Coolant
  - Water remover
- Wide mirror
- Surface care
  - Car shampoo for self washing and washing shop
  - Coating
  - Premium carnauba wax
  - Foaming shampoo
  - Tire coating gel
  - Tire shine
  - Wheel clean&shine
  - Leather cleaner
  - Leather lotion
  - Scratch remover
  - Compound
  - Sticker & tar remover
  - Bug cleaner
- Glass care
  - Rain repellent
  - Washer fluid
  - Ultimate glass clean
  - Deicer
  - Anti-fog
  - Wiper blade
- Air care
  - Air fresheners (Grasse, Pola family)
  - Deodorizers (Saladdin)
  - Diffuser lines (Objet) for Car & Home

== See also ==
- Auto parts
- Economy of South Korea
