= Show's Just Begun =

Studio album by MC Mong
- Released: April 17, 2008
- Recorded: October 2007–April 2008
- Genre: K-pop, hip hop
- Length: 59:44
- Language: Korean
- Label: M.A. Wilddog Entertainment

MC Mong chronology
The Way I Am (2006)	Show's Just Begun (2008)	Humanimal (2009)

Singles from Show's Just Begun
- 1. ""서커스" ("Circus")" Released: April 21, 2008; 2. ""미치겠어" ("Feel Crazy")" Released: June 13, 2008

Show's Just Begun is MC Mong's fourth album, which was released 17 months after his third album, The Way I Am, on April 17, 2008. MC Mong took part in composing, writing, arranging, and producing all tracks on this album. The first title track off this album was "Circus", followed by "Feel Crazy". As the title of his fourth album suggests, the concept for this album revolves around a circus theme.

== Featurings ==
Like his previous albums, this album features a variety of artists including female artists such as Korean American R&B singer Lena Park, MayBee, and R&B group Big Mama.

It also features rapper $howgun (a.k.a. Park Jang Geun), comedian Noh Hong-cheol, rapper and MC Defconn, comedian and good-friend Haha, and many others.

== Music video ==
Three music videos were released for this album. The first being "서커스Circus", then "죽도록사랑해 (Love You Even When I Die)" and "미치겠어 (Feel Crazy)".

=== "서커스" ("Circus") ===
The music video for "서커스" ("Circus") features rapper Park Jang Geun and two young boys who performed with MC Mong during most of his performances for "서커스" ("Circus").

In the beginning of the music video, Noh Hong-cheol makes a cameo appearance as a master of ceremonies (MC) and introduces MC Mong. Behind the curtains, MC Mong is nervously waiting in a waiting room for a circus show. Next, rappers Inati, Dayday and Dari of Dalmatian (pre-debut) come out of a silver car and enter into the waiting room with a surprise. MC Mong gets up from the chair and allows them to sit while he stands. Next, MC Mong leaves the waiting room where he starts singing on stage for his first broadcast. In the waiting room, Dalmatian's rapping line starts pointing and laughing at MC Mong. After that, MC Mong is seen with a bouquet of flowers with many paparazzi taking pictures of him for winning the popularity award. After becoming popular, the next scene shows MC Mong and a girl being caught in a car by the paparazzi. He then holds a press conference to explain the situation. Next, he becomes famous and re-enters the same waiting room in the beginning of the scene where he "shoos" off the three members of Dalmatian and sits in their place. Noh Hong-cheol re-appears at the end saying "Did it bring you tears". As the camera zooms out, MC Mong stares into the TV that Noh Hong-cheol was in with a straight face. Lastly, he turns off the television set, which ends with his stage name and the name of the track ("Circus") in bright, lively colors.

=== "죽도록사랑해" ("Love You Even When I Die") ===
At the beginning of the video, it features South Korean citizens saying "I Love You" to their loved ones. For the rest of the music video, it is a compilation of clips of MC Mong's concerts, clips of him and Lena Park in the recording studio producing the song "죽도록사랑해" ("Love You Even When I Die") with fellow friends and producers, and behind the scenes of his fourth album jacket with a message at the end of the music video thanking the fans and wishing them the best.

=== "미치겠어" ("Feel Crazy") ===
The music video for "미치겠어" ("Feel Crazy") features MC Mong's manager, Lee Heon-suk, male duo M.A.C and also rapper Park Jang Geun and actress Park Ye-jin.

The music video starts off with MC Mong getting out of a black convertible presenting Park Ye-jin a bouquet of flowers which she tosses in the air and then leaves. He then returns to his car touching a panel screen where scenes of him dancing and other scenes take place. In the end, Park Ye Jin falls for MC Mong. In the last couple seconds of the music video, the video was unedited where you could see rapper Park Jang Geun leaving the set while MC Mong lays down in the black background setting after dancing tiredly.

== Track listing ==
No.	Title	Writer(s)	Length
1.	"Radio Revers and Rhyme"	MC Mong, Kim Gun Woo	1:08
2.	"서커스 (Circus)" (featuring Lim Yoo Kyung & $howgun)	MC Mong, Kim Gun Woo	3:38
3.	"페르시안 고양이 (Persian Cat)"	MC Mong, Keeproots	3:18
4.	"아홉번째 구름 (Cloud Nine)" (featuring Yangpa)	MayBee, MC Mong, Kim Gun Woo	4:09
5.	"죽도록사랑해 (Love You Even When I Die)" (featuring Lena Park)	MC Mong, Kim Hee Won	5:24
6.	"그녀에 취해 (Drunk For Her)" (featuring Hoo Na Hoon)	MC Mong, Kim Gun Woo	5:04
7.	"미치겠어 (Feel Crazy)" (featuring M.A.C)	MC Mong	4:01
8.	"내 맘속 사랑을 죽이다 (The Love In My Heart Is Dead)" (featuring $howgun & Jandi)	MC Mong, Park Jang Geun, Kim Gun Woo	4:50
9.	"Beautiful Life" (featuring Big Mama)	MC Mong, Kim Gun Woo	4:59
10.	"숨바꼭질 (Hide And Seek)"	MC Mong, David Kim, Kim Gun Woo	3:43
11.	"삐에로 (Clown)" (featuring M.A.C)	MC Mong, K Soul	4:12
12.	"말해 (Tell Me)"	MC Mong	3:53
13.	"옛날 옛적에 (In The Old Days)"	Heo In Chang, Hoo Na Hoon, Jang In Tae, MC Mong, Park Jang Geun, David Kim, Ee Dari, Shinsadong Horaengi	5:33
14.	"몽이 유랑단 (Mong's Wanderings)" (featuring Noh Hong-cheol, Defconn, Haha & Dalmatian)	MC Mong, Kim Gun Woo	5:22
Total length:			59:44

== Response and chart recognition ==
Within a matter of weeks, mobile service providers such as KTF, SK Telecom, and LG Telecom said that there were about 30,000 downloads a day for MC Mong's songs from his fourth album, receiving almost 300,000 downloads within the first week. Among the downloads, not only "Circus" was doing well, but also other tracks like "Love You Even When I Die", "Cloud Nine", and "Beautiful Life" were popular downloads.

With the success of "Circus", the album was very successful and won him 5 weekly awards from KBS' Music Bank between April and May 2008. MC Mong also won the Digital Bonsang Award at the 23rd Golden Disk Awards for this album.

== Awards ==
- KBS Music Bank K-Chart, First Place (5 weeks, April - May)
- 23rd Golden Disk Awards, Digital Bonsang Award
