= Girl's Day Everyday 3 =

Girl's Day Everyday #3

EP by Girl's Day
- Released: January 3, 2014
- Recorded: 2013–2014
- Length: 15:50
- Label: Dream Tea Entertainment; LOEN Entertainment
- Producer: Duble Sidekick; Radio Galaxi; David Kim; Tenzo&Tasco

Girl's Day chronology
Expectation (2013)	Girl's Day Everyday #3 (2014)	Girl's Day Everyday #4 (2014)

Singles from Girl's Day Everyday #3
- 1. "Something" Released: January 3, 2014

Music video
- "Something'" on YouTube

Girl's Day Everyday #3 (also stylized as Girl's Day Everyday III) is the fourth mini-album released by South Korean girl group, Girl's Day. It was released by Dream Tea Entertainment and distributed by Loen Entertainment on January 3, 2014. It consists of five songs, including the title track "Something", used to promote the EP on several South Korean music programs, including Music Bank and Inkigayo. A music video for the title track was also released on January 3.

The EP was a commercial success peaking at number 3 on the Gaon Album Chart. The EP has sold over 20,814 physical copies as of December 2014.

== Background and release ==
The EP was released on January 3, 2014, at midnight KST, through several music portals, including Melon, and iTunes for the global market.

== Commercial performance ==
Girl's Day Everyday #3 entered and peaked at number 3 on the Gaon Album Chart on the chart issue dated December 29, 2013 - January 4, 2014. In its second week, the EP fell to number 11 and in its third week to number 29. In its fourth week, the EP saw a rise to number 12 and again in its eighth week to number 11. The EP spent a total of thirteen consecutive weeks on the album chart.

The EP entered at number 12 on the Gaon Album Chart for the month of January 2014, with 9,593 physical copies sold. It also charted at number 24 for February, at number 66 for March and at number 70 for April, with a total of 17,585 copies sold. The EP also charted at number 77 on the Gaon Album Chart for the year-end of 2014, with 20,814 copies sold in that year.

== Track listing ==
Digital download

No.	Title	Lyrics	Music	Length
1.	"G.D.P. Intro"	David Kim	Radio Galaxi; David Kim	1:35
2.	"Something"	Duble Sidekick	Duble Sidekick	3:20
3.	"Whistle" (휘파람)	Duble Sidekick	Duble Sidekick; Radio Galaxi	3:34
4.	"Show You"	Duble Sidekick; David Kim	Duble Sidekick; Tenzo&Tasco	4:01
5.	"Something" (Instrumental)		Duble Sidekick	3:20
Total length:				15:50

== Charts ==
=== Weekly charts ===
Chart (2014)	Peak position
South Korea (Gaon Album Chart)	3

=== Monthly charts ===
Chart (2014)	Peak position
South Korea (Gaon Album Chart)	12

=== Year-end charts ===
Chart (2014)	Peak position
South Korea (Gaon Album Chart)	77

== Release history ==
Region	Date	Format	Label
South Korea	January 3, 2014	CD, Digital download	DreamTea Entertainment, Loen Entertainment
Worldwide	January 3, 2014	Digital download	DreamTea Entertainment, Loen Entertainment
