= Imagine Asia =

South Korean company

Imagine Asia Co., Ltd.
- Native name: 주식회사 이매진아시아
- Company type: Public
- Traded as: KRX: 036260
- Industry: Entertainment; Production
- Founded: 1976 (as Banpo Industries)
- Headquarters: 3/F Newtown Building, 113 Apgujeong-ro, Gangnam-gu, Seoul, South Korea
- Services: Artist Management; Television Production; Film Production; Music Production
- Owner: Chungho Comnet Co. (8.9%)
- Divisions: Wellmade Film; Happy Campus; On Da Com
- Subsidiaries: Dream T Entertainment (2013–2020); Dreamcatcher Company (since 2016); Cashmere Records (since 2014); MLD Entertainment (since 2014); YMC Entertainment (2015–2020); Blue Star Entertainment
- Website: imagineasia.com

Imagine Asia (Korean: 이매진아시아; formerly known Wellmade Yedang), is a South Korean entertainment company established in 1976. The company operates as a talent agency, television production company, event management, concert production company, and music publishing house.

== History ==
The company was founded in 1976 as Banpo Industries, an industrial tent manufacturer that was previously headquartered at Seongnam in Gyeonggi Province. In 2000, the company name was changed to Banpo Tech.

Banpo Tech merged in 2006 with Star M Entertainment, becoming Star M. Among the first artists on its roster were actors Shin Min-a, Jang Dong-gun and Hyun Bin. The company was listed on KOSDAQ in 2007.

In 2008, the company name was again changed, to Wellmade Star M. Its headquarters were moved to Gangnam District, Seoul.

In 2013, Wellmade Star M acquired Dream T Entertainment majority shareholders. In 2014, it merged with Yedang Company to form Wellmade Yedang. In 2015, the company acquired 39% shares of YMC Entertainment, its subsidiaries Dream T Entertainment also acquired 41% shares of YMC Entertainment and became a majority shareholders after having 80% shares of YMC. The company also acquired BLUE STAR Entertainment in the same year.

In March 2016, Yedang Entertainment officially renamed to Banana Culture and following Wellmade also renamed to Imagine Asia in June. However, Wellmade Yedang had continued as an independent company.

== Artists ==
=== Actors/actresses ===
- Cha Hwa-yeon (2018–present)
- Choi Jung-won (2017–present)
- Go Yoo-ahn
- Hwang Young-hee
- Im Soo-hyun
- Jang Seo-hee (2017–present)
- Jeon In-hwa
- Jung Na-on
- Kim Da-hyun
- Kim Ho-jin
- Kim Jae-woon
- Kim So-Ra
- Lee Ho-suk
- Lee Il-hwa (2016–present)
- Lee Jung-jun
- Na Hye-mi
- Park Sang-myun
- Park Sang-nam
- Rho Sang-bo
- Shim Eun-jin
- Son Sung-yoon
- Suh Ji-hee
- Yoo Dong-geun
- Yoo Gun-woo
- Yook Jin-su

=== Entertainers ===
- Jung Yi-rang

=== MCs ===
- LJ

== Subsidiaries ==
=== Dream T Entertainment ===
Dream T Entertainment was founded by Lee Jong-suk in 2009. Imagine Asia acquired it in December 2013. The label shut down in 2021.

=== YMC Entertainment ===
YMC Entertainment was founded in 2010 by Cho Yoo-myung, the eldest son of singer Tae Jin-ah. Imagine Asia along with Dream T Entertainment acquired it in July 2015. The label is now closed down as of 2020. Its website is now inaccessible.

=== Blue Star Entertainment ===
Blue Star Entertainment was founded by Byun Dong-jin and Park Chang-jae, former executives of Core Contents Media (now MBK Entertainment). Imagine Asia acquired it in 2015.

Groups

- AA
- C'est si bon

Actors

- Nam Kyung-hee
- Shin Ji-ae

== Divisions ==
=== Wellmade Film ===
Wellmade Film (웰메이드 필름) is a film production company.

Films

- The Warrior's Way (2010)
- The Yellow Sea (황해) (2010)
- As One (코리아) (2012)
- The Show Must Go On (우아한세게) (2007)
- The Huntresses (조선 미녀 삼총사) (2014)

Dramas

- Soul Mechanic (영혼수선공) (2020, in association with Monster Union)
- Doctor Prisoner (닥터 프리즈너) (2019, in association with Jidam Inc.)
- The Third Charm (제3의 매력) (2018, in association with JYP Pictures)
- Come and Hug Me (이리와 안아줘) (2018, in association with Company Ching)
- Mad Dog (매드 독) (2017, in association with Celltrion Entertainment)
- Here Comes Mr Oh (오자룡이 간다) (2011–2013)
- Couples Too Rosy (장미빛 연인들) (2014–2015)

=== Happy Campus Projects ===
Happy Campus Projects (재미난 프로젝트) is a drama production company under Imagine Asia, led by CEO Jung Ah-reum.

Drama

- Entertainer (딴따라) (2016)
- Wanted (원티드) (2016)
- Schoolgirl Detectives (선얌여고 탐정단) (2014–2015)

=== On Da Com ===
On Da Com (also known as On多com) is a multimedia production company in Seoul, South Korea.

Reality television

- Dad! Where Are We Going? (아빠! 어디가?) (2014–2015)
- Section TV (섹션 TV) (1999–Current)
- Good Morning (좋은아침) (1996–Current)
- Southern Boy Northern Girl (남남 북녀) (2015–Current)
- Peony Stick Club (모란봉 클럽) (2015–Current)
- Infinite Girls (무한걸스) (2010–2013)
- Real Story (猫) (2006–2010)

== Former artists ==
=== Actors ===
- Ha Ji-won (2003–13)
- Lee Jong-suk (2011–15)
- Oh Yeon-seo (2006–17)
- Seo Hyo-rim (2015–17)
- Lee Joon-hyuk
- Lee Sun-bin
- Jo Sung-min
- Jin Ji-hee (2016–19)
- Shin Won-sik
- Bae Hyo-won
- Go Yoon
- Im Ho-gul
- Jo Yun-seo
- Kang Min-ah
- Kim Ga-hwa
- Kim Geum-bi
- Kim Hyo-jin
- Kim Youn-jun
- Park Seul-maro
- Park Min-su
- Ryu Hwa-young (2013–2020)
- Shim Min-chul
- Shim Mina
- Song Kyung-chul
- Yoo A-ran

=== Recording artists ===
- C-Clown (2012–2015)
- Seo Ji-an

Blue Star Entertainment

- Kim Jin-hong (AA, 2013–2015)
- Aoora (AA, 2011–2016)

== Assets ==
- ETN (cable TV channel)
- Park&Noorigae (restaurant)
- OnDaCom (production company)
