= Expectation (album) =

Studio album by Girl's Day
- Released: March 14, 2013
- Recorded: 2011–2013
- Genre: K-pop, Dance-pop, Synthpop
- Length: 46:01 (Expectation); 42:33 (Female President)
- Language: Korean
- Label: DreamTea Entertainment / LOEN Entertainment

Girl's Day chronology
Everyday II (2012)	Expectation (2013)	Girl's Day Everyday 3 (2014)

Singles from Expectation
- 1. "Don't Forget Me" Released: October 26, 2012; 2. "White Day" Released: February 21, 2013; 3. "Expect" Released: March 14, 2013

Alternative cover
- re-release as Female President

Singles from Female President
- 1. "Female President" Released: June 24, 2013

Expectation (Korean: 기대; RR: Gidae) is the first studio album by South Korean girl group Girl's Day. The album was released on March 14, 2013, with the song "Expect" (기대해; Gidaehae) serving as the promotional track. The album's release date coincides with White Day. The album was re-released under the title Female President on June 24, 2013. The song "Female President" (여자 대통령; Yeoja Daetongryeong), was used as the re-release's promotional track.

== Background ==
The album was initially slated for a February 2013 release, however, it was delayed until March 14 for unknown reasons. On March 5, 2013, it was reported that member Yura will be the female lead for the group's music video for "Expect". The album was available for pre-order on South Korean online music stores on March 7, 2013, revealing the album cover and track list. On March 9, a 30-second music video preview for "Expect" was aired on the SBS variety show Star King, showing a more mature and sexy side to them. The official teaser for the music video was released on March 11, 2013, on the group's YouTube channel. Both the music video and album were digitally released at 12:00 p.m. KST.

Three months later, after the release on March 7, Dream Tea Entertainment announced that the group would come back on June 24 with a repackaged version of the album. It was also announced that the group will be also making a 'pool party' showcase for the re-release in the same day. The repackaged album, titled Female President, includes one new song, used as promotional track of it, and an instrumental of the track, replacing the last three tracks of the original album's track list, making the repackaged album's track list include thirteen tracks.

== Composition ==
Expectation is composed of fourteen tracks: an intro, five new songs, five previously released singles, a remix and two instrumentals. "Girl's Day World", the intro of the album, was written and produced by the group's leader So-jin, along with Kwon Seok-in, Choe Dok-wan and Cosmic Sound. Nam Ki-sang produced a major part of the album, with the songs "Expect", "White Day", "Twinkle Twinkle", "Hug Me Once", "Don't Forget Me" and "Don't Let Your Eyes Wander!" being written by him. "I Don't Mind" was written by the members of the group along with Kang Jeon-myung, with production handled by Gregg Pagani and 1023Productions. "Easy Go" was written by Han Sang-won, known for composing the song "Go Go Summer!" by Kara, along with production by Yoon Young-min. "Don't Trust Her" was written by Shina-e and Glory Face, who also produced the song along with Gentleman. "Oh, Great!" was written by Eva and produced by Soul Jin.

The second half of the album consists of singles from their past releases. The songs "Twinkle Twinkle" and "Hug Me Once" are from the extended play Everyday, the remix of "Don't Let Your Eyes Wander!" was released on the digital single "Girl's Day Party #4", "Oh! My God" was first released on their Everyday 2 EP, "Don't Forget Me" was released digitally on the single Girl's Day Party #5. and "White Day" was released as a teaser for the album.

The repackaged version of the album, titled Female President, include only the song "Female President" and its instrumental. The song was written by Kang Jeon-myung, Nam Ki-sang, Daniel R and composed Nam Ki-sang, Kwon Seok-in and Choe Dok-wan. The instrumentals of "Expect", "White Day" and the remix of the song "Don't Flirt!", included on the original edition, were removed for the re-release edition of the album.

== Singles ==
=== "Don't Forget Me" ===
"Don't Forget Me" was released as the digital single album, Girl's Day Party #5, on October 26, 2012. The single is the first release of the group as a quartet after the withdrawal of Ji-hae, who left the group after the promotions of the mini-album Everyday 2. A representative of the group called the single's concept "sexy and feminine". "Don't Forget Me" was composed and produced by Nam Ki-sang, known for producing the group's previous singles "Twinkle Twinkle", "Hug Me Once" and "Don't Flirt". The music video features member Hyeri as the lead star of the story, and also includes the members performing the song in different scenarios. The promotions of "Don't Forget Me" started on October 26, on KBS2's show Music Bank, and ended on December 16, on SBS' Inkigayo.

"Don't Forget Me" debuted at number 142 on South Korea's Gaon Chart. On the following week the song climbed to the position number fourteen, the highest peak of the song on the overall chart. It also peaked at number 15 on Billboard's Korea K-Pop Hot 100.

=== "Expect" ===
The promotions for "Expect" started on March 14, the same day as the album's release, on Mnet's music TV show M! Countdown and finished on April 26, on KBS' Music Bank.

"Expect" debuted at number 11 in its first week on Gaon Chart. In its second week, the song climbed to the number 9 position. It is their second Top 10 hit of the group.

=== "Female President" ===
The promotions for "Female President" started on June 27, on Mnet's M! Countdown. The song won its first music show award (and also first award of the group) on the episode of July 7 of Inkigayo, but due to a coverage of the Asiana Airlines crash, the episode was not aired. They received the award on July 14, on Inkigayo's Mid-Year Special. The songs "Please Don't Go", "I Don't Mind" and "Girl's Day World" were also performed. All music show promotions for the album ended on July 27, on MBC's Show! Music Core.

"Female President" debuted at number 5 on the Gaon Digital Chart. It is their third Top 10 hit and second Top 5, tying with the peak of the song "Twinkle Twinkle". The song also peaked at number 7 on Billboard's K-Pop Hot 100.

== Track listing ==
Expectation track list
No.	Title	Lyrics	Music	Arrangement	Length
1.	"Girl's Day World" (intro)	So-jin, Kwon Seok-in, Choe Dok-wan	So-jin, Cosmic Sound	Cosmic Sound	1:21
2.	"Expect" (기대해; Gidaehae)	Nam Ki-sang, Daniel R.	Nam Ki-sang, Kwon Seok-in, Choe Dok-wan	Nam Ki-sang, Kwon Seok-in, Choe Dok-wan	3:15
3.	"I Don't Mind"	Girl's Day, Kang Jeon-myung	Gregg Pagani, 1023Productions	Gregg Pagani, 1023Productions	4:48
4.	"Easy Go."	Han Sang-won	Han Sang-won, Yoon Young-min	Han Sang-won, Yoon Young-min	3:24
5.	"Don't Trust Her" (그녀를 믿지마; Geunyeoreul Midjima)	Shina-e, Glory Face	Gentleman, Glory Face	Glory Face	3:35
6.	"White Day"	Nam Ki-sang, Daniel R.	Nam Ki-sang, Radio Galaxy	Radio Galaxy	3:08
7.	"Oh, Great!" (어쩜 좋아; Eojjeom Joha)	Eva	Soul Jin	Yang Seung-taec (stereo)	3:10
8.	"Twinkle Twinkle" (반짝반짝; Banjjak Banjjak)	Nam Ki-sang, Park Keon-ho, Kang Jeon-myung	Nam Ki-sang	Nam Ki-sang	3:05
9.	"Hug Me Once" (한번만 안아줘; Hanbeonman Anajwo)	Nam Ki-sang, Kang Jeon-myung	Nam Ki-sang	Nam Ki-sang	3:14
10.	"Oh! My God"	Kang Ji-won, Kim Ki-bum	Kang Ji-won, Kim Ki-bum	Kang Ji-won	3:08
11.	"Don't Forget Me" (나를 잊지마요; Nareul Itjimayo)	Nam Ki-sang	Nam Ki-sang	Kwon Seok-in, Choe Dok-wan	3:10
12.	"Don't Flirt!" (DJ stereo club mix; 너, 한눈 팔지마!; Neo, Hannun Paljima!)	Nam Ki-sang, Kang Jeon-myung	Nam Ki-sang	Nam Ki-sang	4:26
13.	"Expectation" (instrumental; 기대해; Gidaehae)		Nam Ki-sang, Kwon Seok-in, Choe Dok-wan	Nam Ki-sang, Kwon Seok-in, Choe Dok-wan	3:15
14.	"White Day" (instrumental)		Nam Ki-sang, Radio Galaxy	Radio Galaxy	3:08
Total length:					46:01

Female President re-release track list
No.	Title	Lyrics	Music	Arrangement	Length
1.	"Girl's Day World" (intro)	So-jin, Kwon Seok-in, Choe Dok-wan	So-jin, Cosmic Sound	Cosmic Sound	1:21
2.	"Female President" (여자 대통령; Yeoja Daetongryeong)	Kang Jeon-myung, Nam Ki-sang, Daniel R.	Nam Ki-sang, Kwon Seok-in, Choe Dok-wan	Kwon Seok-in, Choe Dok-wan	3:33
3.	"Expect" (기대해; Gidaehae)	Nam Ki-sang, Daniel R.	Nam Ki-sang, Kwon Seok-in, Choe Dok-wan	Nam Ki-sang, Kwon Seok-in, Choe Dok-wan	3:15
4.	"I Don't Mind"	Girl's Day, Kang Jeon-myung	Gregg Pagani, 1023Productions	Gregg Pagani, 1023Productions	4:48
5.	"Easy Go."	Han Sang-won	Han Sang-won, Yoon Young-min	Han Sang-won, Yoon Young-min	3:24
6.	"Don't Trust Her" (그녀를 믿지마; Geunyeoreul Midjima)	Shina-e, Glory Face	Gentleman, Glory Face	Gentleman	3:35
7.	"White Day"	Nam Ki-sang, Daniel R.	Nam Ki-sang, Radio Galaxy	Radio Galaxy	3:08
8.	"Oh, Great!" (어쩜 좋아; Eojjeom Joha)	Eva	Soul Jin	Yang Seung-taec (Stereo)	3:10
9.	"Twinkle Twinkle" (반짝반짝; Banjjak Banjjak)	Nam Ki-sang, Park Keon-ho, Kang Jeon-myung	Nam Ki-sang	Nam Ki-sang	3:05
10.	"Hug Me Once" (한번만 안아줘; Hanbeonman Anajwo)	Nam Ki-sang, Kang Jeon-myung	Nam Ki-sang	Nam Ki-sang	3:14
11.	"Oh! My God"	Kang Ji-won, Kim Ki-bum	Kang Ji-won, Kim Ki-bum	Kang Ji-won	3:08
12.	"Don't Forget Me" (나를 잊지마요; Nareul Itjimayo)	Nam Ki-sang	Nam Ki-sang	Kwon Seok-in, Choe Dok-wan	3:10
13.	"Female President" (instrumental; 여자 대통령; Yeoja Daetongryeong)		Nam Ki-sang, Kwon Seok-in, Choe Dok-wan	Kwon Seok-in, Choe Dok-wan	3:32
Total length:					42:33

== Chart performance ==
=== Expectation ===
Chart	Peak position
Gaon Weekly album chart	4
Gaon Monthly album chart	9

=== Female President ===
Chart	Peak position
Gaon Weekly album chart	6
Gaon Monthly album chart	16

== Release history ==
Country	Date	Format	Label	Edition
South Korea	March 14, 2013	Digital download	DreamTea Entertainment; LOEN Entertainment	Expectation
South Korea	March 15, 2013	CD	DreamTea Entertainment; LOEN Entertainment	Expectation
South Korea	June 24, 2013	Digital download	DreamTea Entertainment; LOEN Entertainment	Female President
South Korea	June 26, 2013	CD	DreamTea Entertainment; LOEN Entertainment	Female President
