= Girl's Day Everyday 4 =

Girl's Day Everyday #4

EP by Girl's Day
- Released: July 14, 2014
- Length: 14:42
- Label: Dream Tea Entertainment; LOEN Entertainment
- Producer: Duble Sidekick; David Kim; Radio Galaxi; Tenzo&Tasco

Girl's Day chronology
Girl's Day Everyday #3 (2014)	Girl's Day Everyday #4 (2014)	Love (2015)

Singles from Girl's Day Everyday #4
- 1. "Darling" Released: July 14, 2014

Music video
- "Darling'" on YouTube

Girl's Day Everyday #4 is the fifth EP released by South Korean girl group, Girl's Day. It was released by Dream Tea Entertainment and distributed by LOEN Entertainment on July 14, 2014. It consists of five songs, including the title track "Darling". The song was used to promote the EP on several music programs, including Music Bank and Inkigayo. A music video for the title track was also released on July 14.

The EP was a commercial success peaking at number 3 on the Gaon Album Chart. The EP has sold over 23,773 physical copies as of December 2014.

== Release ==
The EP was released on July 14, 2014, at midnight KST, through several music portals, including Melon and iTunes for the global market.

== Commercial performance ==
Girl's Day Everyday #4 entered and peaked at number 3 on the Gaon Album Chart on the chart issue dated July 13–19, 2014. In its second week, the EP fell to number 7 and to number 20 in its third week. In its fourth week, the EP saw a rise to number 10. The EP spent a total of twenty-one consecutive weeks on the album chart.

The EP entered at number 10 on the Gaon Album Chart for the month of July 2014, with 10,667 physical copies sold. It also charted at number 22 for August, at number 29 for September and at number 54 for October, for a total of 22,932 copies sold. The EP also charted at number 74 for the year-end of 2014, with 23,773 copies sold.

== Track listing ==
Digital download

No.	Title	Lyrics	Music	Length
1.	"Summer Party (Intro)" (feat. David Kim)	David Kim	David Kim; Radio Galaxi	1:17
2.	"Darling"	Duble Sidekick	Duble Sidekick	3:13
3.	"Look at Me"	Duble Sidekick	Duble Sidekick; Tenzo&Tasco	3:40
4.	"Timing"	Duble Sidekick	Duble Sidekick; Radio Galaxi	3:19
5.	"Darling" (Instrumental)		Duble Sidekick	3:13
Total length:				14:42

== Charts ==
=== Weekly charts ===
Chart (2014)	Peak position
South Korea (Gaon Album Chart)	3

=== Monthly charts ===
Chart (2014)	Peak position	Sales
South Korea (Gaon Album Chart)	10	10,667 (physical copies)

=== Year-end charts ===
Chart (2014)	Peak position	Sales
South Korea (Gaon Album Chart)	74	23,773 (physical copies)

== Release history ==
Region	Date	Format	Label
South Korea	January 3, 2014	CD, Digital download	DreamTea Entertainment, Loen Entertainment
Worldwide	January 3, 2014	Digital download	DreamTea Entertainment, Loen Entertainment
