= Girl's Day =

South Korean girl group

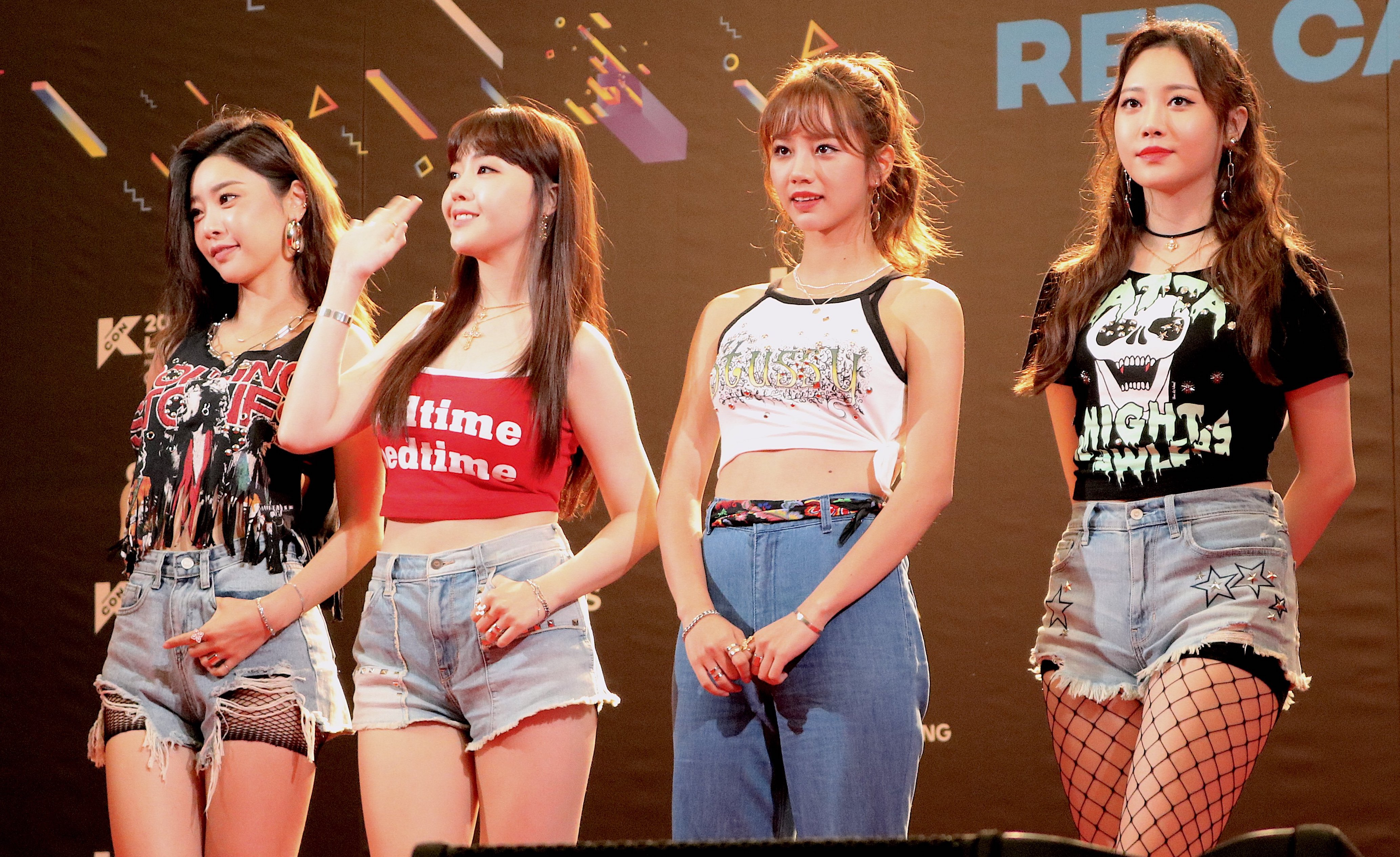
- Girl's Day in 2017; From left to right: Sojin, Minah, Hyeri, Yura

Background information
- Origin: Seoul, South Korea
- Genres: K-pop; dance-pop; electro swing
- Years active: 2010–2019 (Note: Indefinite hiatus)
- Labels: Dream T; Kiss
- Members: Sojin; Yura; Minah; Hyeri
- Past members: Jihae; Jisun; Jiin

Girl's Day (Korean: 걸스데이) is a South Korean girl group formed by Dream T Entertainment in 2010. The group consists of members Sojin, Minah, Yura, and Hyeri. Members Jisun and Jiin officially left the group in 2010, while Jihae left in late 2012.

After said member departures, the quartet went on to become one of the most popular and commercially successful groups of its era. In order of release, the group's biggest hits include "Twinkle Twinkle", "Hug Me Once", "Expect", "Something", "Darling", and "Ring My Bell", all of which have sold more than one million digital copies each.

Over the span of their career, Girl's Day has endorsed over 20 brands, including LG Electronics, Ezaki Glico's Pocky, Lotte World, Nexon and Bullsone. Girl's Day ranked 13th in Korea Power Celebrity in 2015, a list ranking Korea's most powerful and influential celebrities. In 2016, the group ranked 26th, whereas member Hyeri ranked 3rd.

In 2019, the four members decided not to renew their contracts with Dream T Entertainment, but have stated that they haven't disbanded. Their last release was the EP Everyday #5 in 2017.

== Career ==
=== 2010–2011: Debut and Everyday ===
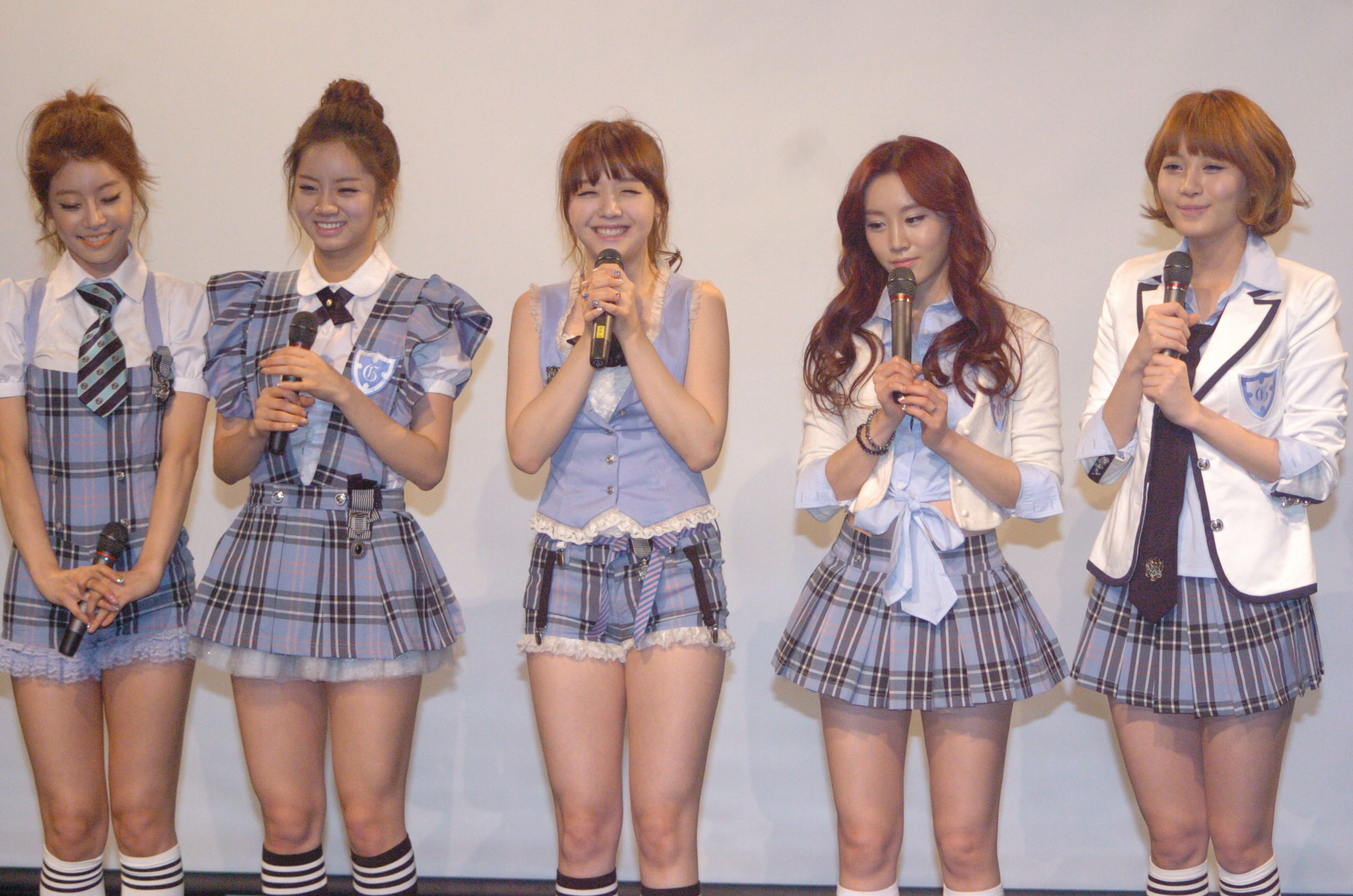
Girl's Day in 2012

In July 2010, Girl's Day debuted with five members: Jihae, Jisun, Jiin, Sojin, and Minah. The first song by Girl's Day, "Tilt My Head" ("갸우뚱"), was released on July 7. Their debut EP Girl's Day Party #1 was released two days after. The group followed up promotions for "Tilt My Head" with the song "How About Me" ("나어때"), for which they released a music video on July 21. Two months after the group debuted, members Jisun and Jiin left the group to pursue individual interests. Current members Yura and Hyeri were then added to the group to replace them. The new lineup's digital release Girl's Day Party #2 became available on October 29. The song "Nothing Lasts Forever" ("잘해줘봐야") was used as the lead track of the digital single.

In March 2011, Girl's Day digitally released Girl's Day Party #3, with the single "Twinkle Twinkle" ("반짝반짝"). The song was a commercial success, ranking 4th on Melon's digital monthly chart in April. Overall, the song ranked 39th on the service's annual chart. On May 7 the group performed in their first overseas concert held in Taiwan. The concert was organized by the Korea Tourism Organization, and also featured performances by U-KISS and Super Junior M.

In July, Girl's Day released a second EP titled Everyday, with "Hug Me Once" ("한번만 안아줘") as the title track. The group released Girls' Day Party #4 in September, with the track "Don't Flirt" ("너, 한눈 팔지마!"). Both releases performed well digitally, ranking in the top 50 of Melon's digital monthly chart following their release. The song was written and produced by Gang Jeon-hyong and Nam Ki-san, who also produced previous singles "Twinkle Twinkle" and "Hug Me Once".

=== 2012–2013: Everyday 2, Expectation and rising popularity ===
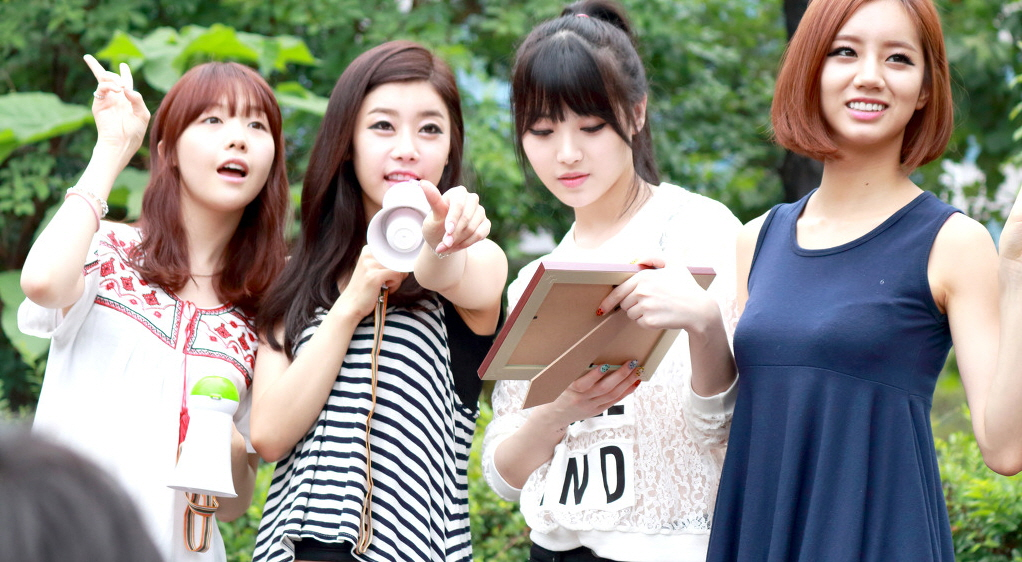
At a fan meeting in 2013

Girl's Day's third EP, Everyday 2, was released on April 17, 2012. It contained the song "Telepathy"-written and produced by Sojin-in addition to the title track "Oh! My God". On October 17, Dream T Entertainment revealed that Jihae had left the group for personal reasons. The remaining four members returned with the song "Don't Forget Me" ("나를 잊지마요") from Girl's Day Party #5.

In February 2013, Girl's Day released the single "White Day", followed by their first full-length album Expectation on March 14. The album's title track, "Expectation" ("기대해"), became a commercial success and was awarded the 'Long-Run Song of the Year' award at the third Gaon Chart K-Pop Awards and ranked 36th overall on Melon's digital annual chart. They also promoted the track "Female President" ("여자대통령"), which was named one of the "20 Best K-pop Songs of 2013" by Billboard. Following Expectation, the group released Girl's Day Party #6 with "Please Tell Me" as the title track. They released "Let's Go" ("렛츠 고"), a motivational song written and composed by Sojin.

=== 2014–2016: Everyday #3, Everyday #4, I Miss You, Love and Japanese debut ===
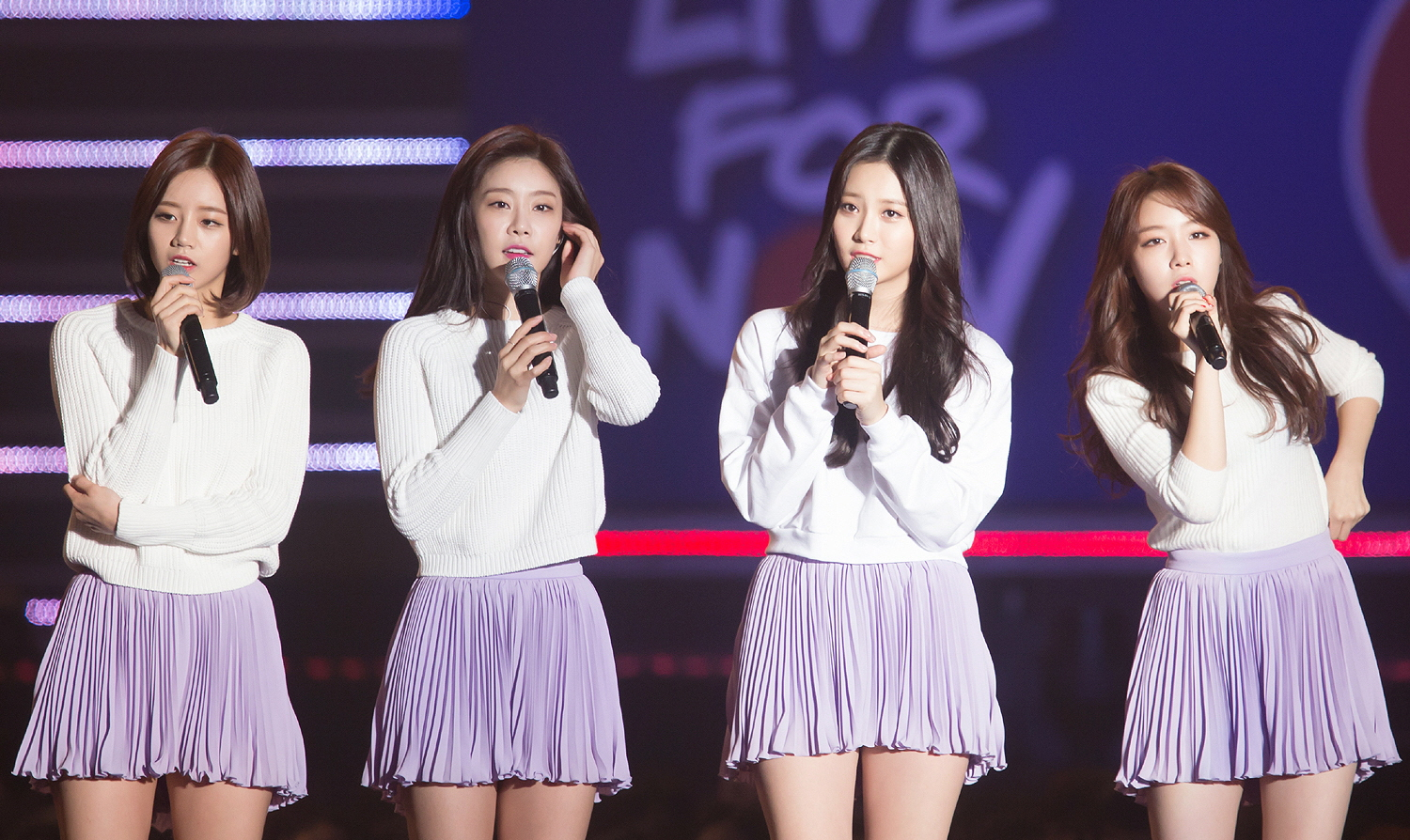
Girl's Day in 2014

On January 3, 2014, Girl's Day released their fourth EP, Everyday 3, which was largely produced by Duble Sidekick. The music video for the title track "Something" ("썸씽") reached over a million views within a day. It became their highest-charting single, peaking at #2 on both Billboard's Korea K-Pop Hot 100 and the Gaon Digital Chart. The song also ranked first on the monthly Gaon Digital Chart, and remained in the top 10 of the Korea K-Pop Hot 100 for eight weeks. Girl's Day live promotions for "Something" won five music show awards, and later won 'Best Dance Performance by a Female Group' at the 2014 Mnet Asian Music Awards. The song ranked 9th on Melon's digital annual chart. In July, the group released their fifth EP, Everyday 4, with the lead single "Darling", which ranked 27th on Melon's digital annual chart. On October 15, the group released the EP and ballad single "I Miss You" ("보고싶어").

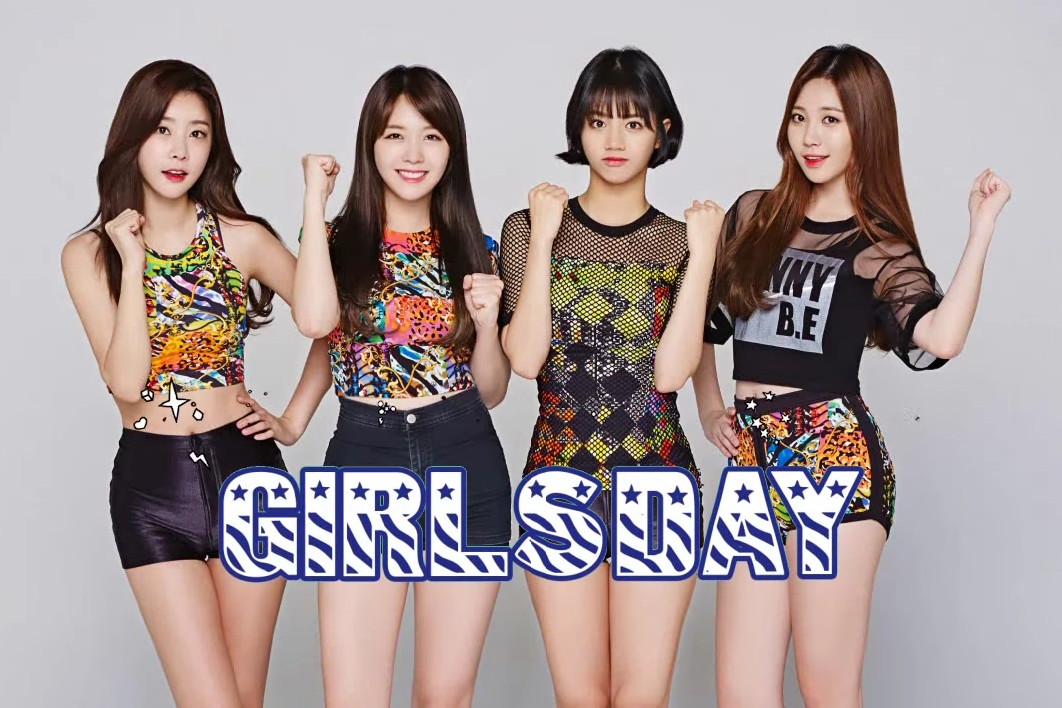
Girl's Day in 2015

In May 2015, Girl's Day released the single "Hello Bubble" in an endorsement with haircare brand Mise-en-scène. The group traveled to Okinawa in June to film for the MBC reality programme One Fine Day. Girl's Day released their second full-length album Love, along with its title track "Ring My Bell", in July 2015. During promotions for the album, the group faced controversy over their July 7 appearance on a Korean internet-streamed program, ChoiKoon TV. The Girl's Day members were criticized by audiences for what was seen as disrespectful behavior, and appeared on the stream the following day to offer an apology. Nevertheless, "Ring My Bell" remained in the top 10 of Melon's monthly digital chart in July despite controversy. On September 30, Girl's Day made their Japanese debut with the album Girl's Day 2015 Autumn Party. It contained Japanese versions of the singles "Darling", "Twinkle Twinkle" and "Ring My Bell". The group also held a showcase in Taipei on November 1, performing twelve of their songs to an audience of 2,000 fans.

=== 2017–2019: Everyday #5 and departure from Dream T ===
On March 2, 2017, Dream T Entertainment announced that Girl's Day was set to comeback after 21-month long hiatus during which the members focused on solo activities. The agency revealed that the group is in the process of wrapping up recording for their title track, and the comeback was set for late March 2017. On March 10, Dream T Entertainment confirmed that Girl's Day was set to make their comeback on March 27 with their new mini album. On March 17, Dream T Entertainment released the group's comeback schedule and revealed that the new album would be the fifth part of the "Everyday" series.

On the day of their comeback, the official music video for "I'll Be Yours", the title track, was released simultaneously on the official Girl's Day YouTube channel and 1theK's channel; the music video on 1theK's channel surpassed 2 million views in less than 24 hours. Their new EP, Everyday #5, debuted at No. 7 on Billboard's World Albums chart this week. Domestically, the title track ranked 2nd on the Genie chart and 11th on the Melon chart.

In 2018, all four members were torchbearers at the 2018 Winter Olympics.

On January 11, 2019, it was reported that all of the members would not re-sign with Dream T Entertainment and they would join separate agencies while not officially disbanding.

== Ambassadorship for Plan Korea ==
In August 2013, Girl's Day were appointed honorary ambassadors for the Plan Korea campaign "Because I Am a Girl". That month the group visited Chiang Rai, Thailand, where they carried out volunteer work. The group returned to Thailand a year later to participate in a campaign for girls' birth registration. The entire proceeds from the group's concert in 2014 were donated to support the birth registration of girls in developing countries. In February 2016, Sojin and Yura represented Girl's Day as Plan Korea ambassadors in Cambodia, volunteering at a school where they held art and music workshops. Minah and Hyeri did not join the trip due to illness and drama commitments respectively. In 2017, Hyeri was appointed as one of the ambassadors for the Count Every Child birth registration campaign.

== Discography ==
- Expectation (2013)
- Love (2015)

== Concerts ==
=== South Korea ===
- 2014: Summer Party

=== Japan ===
- 2012: Girl's Day Party in Zepp
- 2014: Winter Party
- 2015: Autumn Party

== Filmography ==
=== TV shows ===
| Year | Show | Network | Note |
|---|---|---|---|
| 2011 | Kira Kira Slim | Mnet Japan | Documentary, 26 Episodes |
| 2014 | Human Documentary | MBC | Documentary |
| 2014 | Picnic Live | MBC Music | Show |
| 2015 | One Fine Day | MBC Music | Series, 9 Episodes (8 + 1 Special) |
