= Don McLean discography =

- Don McLean performing for the 2026 Founders Ball at the Andrew W. Mellon Auditorium, Washington D.C.
- Studio albums: 22
- Live albums: 4
- Compilation albums: 10
- Singles: 16

The discography of American singer Don McLean consists of 22 studio albums, four live albums, 15 compilation albums, 20 singles, and 2 rarities.

== Albums ==
=== Studio albums ===
Year	Album	Chart positions				Certifications
Year	Album	US	AUS	CAN	UK	Certifications
1970	Tapestry (Note: Tapestry did not chart in Australia or the UK until 1972 after the success of American Pie.)	111	22	—	16	
1971	American Pie	1	1	1	2	RIAA: 2× Platinum; MC: Gold; BPI: Gold
1972	Don McLean	23	15	15	—	
1973	Playin' Favorites	—	22	—	42	
1974	Homeless Brother	120	65	—	—	
1977	Prime Time	—	—	—	—	
1978	Chain Lightning (Note: Chain Lightning also peaked at #3 on the RPM Country Albums chart in Canada.)	28	41	25	19	
1981	Believers	156	15	—	—	
1987	Love Tracks	—	—	—	—	
1990	Headroom	—	—	—	—	
1991	Christmas	—	—	—	—	
1995	The River of Love	—	—	—	—	
1997	Christmas Dreams	—	—	—	—	
2001	Sings Marty Robbins	—	—	—	—	
2003	You've Got to Share: Songs for Children	—	—	—	—	
2003	The Western Album	—	—	—	—	
2005	Rearview Mirror: An American Musical Journey	—	—	—	—	
2009	Addicted to Black	—	—	—	—	
2018	Botanical Gardens	—	—	—	—	
2020	Still Playin' Favorites	—	—	—	—	
2024	American Boys	—	—	—	—	
"—" denotes releases that did not chart or were not released in that territory.

=== Live albums ===
Year	Album
1976	Solo
1982	Dominion
2001	Starry, Starry Night
2014	Don McLean: Live in Manchester

=== Compilation albums ===
Year	Album	Chart positions		Certifications
Year	Album	AUS	UK	Certifications
1980	The Very Best of Don McLean	2	4	ARIA: Platinum; BPI: Gold
1986	For the Memories	63	—	
1987	Don McLean's Greatest Hits · Then & Now	—	—	
1989	For the Memories Vols I & II	—	—	
1989	And I Love You So	—	—	
1991	The Best of Don McLean	—	—	
1992	Classics	—	—	RIAA: Gold; MC: Gold
1992	Favorites and Rarities	—	—	
2000	American Pie – The Greatest Hits	—	30	BPI: Gold
2002	Classic Collection	57	—	
2003	Legendary Songs of Don McLean	—	71	
2004	Christmastime!	—	—	
2007	The Legendary Don McLean	—	—	
2008	American Pie & Other Hits	—	—	
2012	American Troubadour	—	—	
"—" denotes releases that did not chart.

== Singles ==
Year	Title	Peak chart positions									Certifications	Album
Year	Title	US	US A/C	US Cou.	AUS	CAN	CAN A/C	CAN Cou.	IRE	UK	Certifications	Album
1971	"Castles in the Air" (Note: The original version of "Castles in the Air" was included on the Tapestry album. In January 1971, it was released as the first single from the album and reached No. 40 on the Billboard Easy Listening / Adult Contemporary chart. After the success of the "American Pie" single, "Castles in the Air" was included as the B-side to its follow-up, "Vincent", and received enough radio airplay to reach the Hot 100 chart as a "flip". McLean's 1981 version of the song, a slower ballad version of the more mid- to up-tempo original, first appeared on his album Believers, and later replaced the original version on some copies of Tapestry.)	—	40	—	—	—	—	—	—	—		Tapestry
1971	"American Pie"	1	1	—	1	1	1	—	7	2	RIAA: 6× Platinum; MC: 5× Platinum; BPI: 2× Platinum; RMNZ: 5× Platinum	American Pie
1972	"Vincent"	12	2	—	3	3	13	—	1	1	RIAA: Platinum; MC: Platinum; BPI: Platinum; RMNZ: Platinum	American Pie
1973	"And I Love You So"	—	—	—	—	—	—	—	—	—		Tapestry
1973	"Dreidel"	21	7	—	34	16	5	—	—	56 (Note: Chart position is from the official UK "Breakers List".)		Don McLean
1973	"If We Try"	58	12	—	9	82	22	—	—	—		Don McLean
1973	"Everyday"	—	—	—	—	—	—	—	—	38		Playin' Favorites
1974	"Mountains O'Mourne"	—	—	—	90	—	—	—	2	—		Playin' Favorites
1974	"Fool's Paradise"	107	25	—	—	—	90	—	—	—		Playin' Favorites
1974	"La La Love You"	— (Note: "La La Love You" reached No. 111 on the Cashbox singles chart.)	—	—	—	—	—	—	—	—		Homeless Brother
1975	"Wonderful Baby"	93	1	—	—	—	—	—	—	60		Homeless Brother
1980	"Crying"	5	2	6	27	7	—	1	1	1	BPI: Silver	Chain Lightning
1981	"Since I Don't Have You"	23	6	68	—	45	2	—	—	—		Chain Lightning
1981	"It's Just the Sun"	83	20	—	92	—	12	—	—	—		Chain Lightning
1981	"Castles in the Air"	36	7	—	11	—	2	—	—	47		Believers
1987	"He's Got You"	—	—	73	—	—	—	—	—	—		Greatest Hits Then & Now
1987	"You Can't Blame the Train"	—	—	49	—	—	—	—	—	—		Love Tracks
1988	"Love in My Heart"	—	—	65	—	—	—	—	—	—		Love Tracks
1991	"American Pie" (reissue)	—	—	—	—	—	—	—	9	12		The Best of Don McLean
2012	"American Pie" (2nd reissue)	—	—	—	—	—	—	—	—	78		The Best of Don McLean
"—" denotes releases that did not chart or were not released in that territory.

== Rarities ==
Year	Title	Additional information
1982	"The Flight of Dragons"	This song was recorded for the film The Flight of Dragons in the early 1980s.
1994	"Vincent" (live version)	Grammy's Greatest Moments Volume III
