= Starry Night (disambiguation) =

The Starry Night is an 1889 painting by Vincent van Gogh.

Starry Night may also refer to:

== Paintings ==
- Starry Night Over the Rhône, an 1888 painting by Vincent van Gogh
- Starry Night (Millet), an 1850 painting by Jean-François Millet
- Starry Night (Munch), an 1893 painting by Edvard Munch

== Music ==
=== Albums ===
- Starry Night (album), by Julio Iglesias, 1990
- Starry Night, an album and video by Ike Moriz, 2009
- Starry Night (BoA EP) or the title song, 2019
- Starry Night (Momoland EP) or the title song (see below), 2020

=== Songs ===
- "Starry Night" (Chris August song), 2010
- "Starry Night" (Fifty Fifty song), 2024
- "Starry Night" (Joe Satriani song), 2002
- "Starry Night" (Mamamoo song), 2018
- "Starry Night" (Momoland song), 2020
- "Starry Night", by Hixxy from Bonkers 3: A Journey into Madness, 1997
- "Starry Night", by Suho from Self-Portrait, 2020
- "Vincent", by Don MacLean (often erroneously titled after its opening refrain, "Starry, Starry Night"), 1972

== Television and film ==
- "Starry Night" (Boy Meets World), a television episode
- "Starry Night" (Modern Family), a television episode
- "The Starry Night" (Squid Game), a television episode
- Starry Night (1999 film), a film by Paul Davids
- Starry Night (2005 film), a short film by Ben Miller
- Starry Night, a 2006 television commercial for Halo 3
- Starry Night Productions, a television production company owned by Reinhold Weege

== Other ==
- Starry Night (Portland, Oregon), now the Roseland Theater, in Portland, Oregon
- Starry Night, a module in the screensaver After Dark
- Starry Nights, a 1991 novel by Shobha De
- Starry Night, a Jägermeister cocktail

== See also ==
- Stargazing
- Starry Starry Night (disambiguation)
