= Starry Starry Night =

Starry Starry Night may refer to:

- Starry, Starry Night (album), a 2001 album by Don McLean
- "Starry, starry night", the opening line of Don McLean's 1971 song "Vincent", often referred to by that name
- Starry Starry Night (film), a 2011 Taiwanese film

== See also ==
- Starry Night (disambiguation)
