= Legendary Songs of Don McLean =

Compilation album by Don McLean
- Released: March 25, 2003
- Genre: Rock
- Label: Capitol

Don McLean chronology
Favourites and Rarities (1993)	Legendary Songs of Don McLean (2003)

Legendary Songs of Don McLean is a compilation album by Don McLean. The album was released on March 25, 2003.

== Track listing ==
1. Words and Music - 3:05
2. American Pie - 8:33
3. Since I Don't Have You - 2:35
4. Maybe Baby - 2:23
5. Crying - 3:49
6. Castles in the Air - 3:43
7. If I Only Had a Match - 4:40
8. Your Cheatin' Heart - 3:04
9. And I Love You So - 4:16
10. Vincent - 4:00
11. Winterwood - 3:10
12. If We Try - 3:35
13. Everyday - 2:26
14. Wonderful Baby - 2:05
15. Crossroads - 3:39
16. Jerusalem - 3:43
17. Dreidel - 3:47
18. Headroom - 4:12
19. Have You Seen Me - 4:25
20. Just to Hold My Hand - 2:26
21. Empty Chairs - 3:26
