= Classics (Don McLean album) =

Compilation album by Don McLean
- Released: February 3, 1992
- Genres: Rock; pop; folk
- Length: 46:51
- Label: Curb

Don McLean chronology
Christmas (1991)	Classics (1992)	Favorites and Rarities (1993)

Classics is a compilation album by the American singer-songwriter Don McLean released in 1992. The album was certified gold for selling 500,000 copies by the Recording Industry Association of America on August 23, 2024.

== Reception ==
Professional ratings
Review scores
Source	Rating
AllMusic	2.5/5 stars
The Encyclopedia of Popular Music	3/5 stars
MusicHound Rock: The Essential Album Guide	3.5/5 stars

Stephen Thomas Erlewine of AllMusic notes that the collection "features some of his biggest hits" but suggests "there are better collections available, offering more songs and better sound for not much more money."

== Track listing ==
All songs written by Don McLean unless otherwise noted.

No.	Title	Writer(s)	Length
1.	"American Pie" (Original Version)		8:34
2.	"Vincent"		5:19
3.	"And I Love You So"		4:47
4.	"Crying"	Roy Orbison; Joe Melson	3:50
5.	"Since I Don't Have You"	Wally Lester; Joe VerScharen; Janet Vogel; James Beaumont; Jackie Taylor	2:36
6.	"Castles in the Air"		3:43
7.	"It's Just the Sun"		2:32
8.	"Jerusalem"		4:43
9.	"It's a Beautiful Life"		8:56
11.	"American Pie" (Extended Version)		8:56
Total length:			45:51

== Certifications ==
Region	Certification	Certified units/sales
Canada (Music Canada)	Gold	50,000^{^}
United States (RIAA)	Gold	500,000^{‡}
^{^} Shipments figures based on certification alone.^{‡} Sales+streaming figures based on certification alone.
