= Favorites and Rarities =

Compilation album by Don McLean
- Released: 1993
- Genre: Rock
- Label: EMI America

Don McLean chronology
The Very Best of Don McLean (1977)	Favorites and Rarities (1993)	Legendary Songs of Don McLean (2003)

Favorites and Rarities is a 1993 compilation album by American musician Don McLean.

Professional ratings
Review scores
Source	Rating
Allmusic	link

== Track listing ==
=== Disc one ===
1. "Castles in the Air" (Mediarts version) - 2:55
2. "And I Love You So" - 4:18
3. "American Pie" - 8:35
4. "Vincent (Starry, Starry Night)" - 4:01
5. "Babylon" - 1:44
6. "Empty Chairs" - 3:26
7. "Dreidel" - 3:47
8. "If We Try" (United Artists version) - 3:34
9. "Fool's Paradise" (Single version) - 3:51
10. "Sitting on Top of the World" - 1:58
11. "La La Love You" - 3:46
12. "Wonderful Baby" - 2:06
13. "Crying in the Chapel" - 2:21
14. "Magdalene Lane" (Live) 4:06
15. "Crying" - 3:43
16. "Since I Don't Have You" - 2:36
17. "Castles in the Air" (Millennium version) - 3:43
18. "He's Got You" - 4:51
19. "Superman's Ghost" - 4:47
20. "You Can't Blame the Train" - 3:06

=== Disc two ===
1. "Good Old Wagon" - 2:25
2. "Milkman's Matinee" - 5:22
3. "Aftermath" - 4:05
4. "Mother Nature" - 6:57
5. "Every Day" (BBC version) - 2:33
6. "That's All Right" - 3:22
7. "Profiteering Blues" - 3:02
8. "Hit Parade of Love" - 2:35
9. "The Carnival Has Ended" - 5:39
10. "I'm Blue, I'm Lonesome" - 2:14
11. "Nature Boy" - 1:08
12. "Black Sheep Boy" - 2:44
13. "Mountains o' Mourne" (Live) - 5:14
14. "And Her Mother Came Too" (Live) - 2:45
15. "Yonkers Girl" (Live) - 3:05
16. "Turkey in the Straw" - 0:39
17. "Dubuque" - 0:50
18. "Sally Ann/Muleskinner Blues/Old Joe Clark" - 3:26
19. "If We Try" (EMI America version) - 4:00
20. "Perfect Love" - 3:21
21. "Little Child" - 3:05
22. "Gotta Make You Mine" - 3:15

== Notes ==
- "You Can't Blame the Train" composed by singer/songwriter Terri Sharp.
