= Christmastime! =

Compilation album by Don McLean
- Released: 2004
- Genre: Rock, Christmas
- Label: Don McLean

Don McLean chronology
The Western Album (2003)	Christmastime! (2004)	Rearview Mirror: An American Musical Journey (2005)

Christmastime! is an album by American singer-songwriter Don McLean, released in 2004. It is a complete collection of Don McLean's Christmas recordings and contains all of the songs previously released on Christmas and Christmas Dreams as well as two songs new to this collection.

== Track listing ==
1. "Winter Wonderland"
2. "O Little Town of Bethlehem"
3. "Blue Christmas"
4. "The Christmas Waltz"
5. "Santa Claus Is Comin' to Town"
6. "Toyland"
7. "Rudolph the Red-Nosed Reindeer"
8. "I'll Be Home for Christmas/Have Yourself a Merry Little Christmas"
9. "The Christmas Song (Chestnuts Roasting on an Open Fire)"
10. "White Christmas"
11. "Let It Snow! Let It Snow! Let It Snow!"
12. "Silent Night"
13. "Oh Holy Night"
14. "I Heard the Bells on Christmas Day"
15. "Go Tell It on the Mountain"
16. "God Rest Ye Merry Gentlemen"
17. "The Last Month of the Year"
18. "The Burgundian Carol"
19. "Little Child"
20. "It Came Upon a Midnight Clear"
21. "Pretty Paper"
22. "'Twas the Night before Christmas"
