= Second Thoughts =

Second Thought(s) may refer to:

== Film and television ==
- Second Thoughts (1938 film), a British film directed by Albert Parker
- Second Thoughts (1983 film), an American film starring Lucie Arnaz
- Second Thoughts (TV series), a British situation comedy
- "Second Thoughts" (The Outer Limits), a 1997 television episode
- "Second Thoughts" (The Upper Hand), a 1995 television episode

== Other uses ==
- Second Thoughts (album), a 1976 album by Split Enz
- Second Thoughts (Shobhaa De novel), a 1996 novel by Shobha De
- Second Thoughts (Michel Butor novel), a 1957 novel by Michel Butor
- Second Thoughts, a series of conferences organized by Peter Collier and David Horowitz
- "2nd Thought", song by Orchestral Manoeuvres in the Dark from the album Organisation
