= The Very Best of Don McLean =

Greatest hits album by Don McLean
- Released: 1980
- Genre: Rock
- Label: United Artists Records

Don McLean chronology
The Very Best of Don McLean (1980)	Favourites and Rarities (1993)

The Very Best of Don McLean is the first greatest hits album by American singer and guitarist Don McLean. It features 15 of McLean's songs.

Professional ratings
Review scores
Source	Rating
Allmusic	4.5/5 stars

== Track listing ==
1. American Pie
2. Vincent
3. Castles in the Air
4. Dreidel
5. Winterwood
6. Everyday
7. Building My Body
8. And I Love You So
9. Mountains of Mourne
10. Fools Paradise
11. Wonderful Baby
12. La La Love You
13. Prime Time
14. Jump
15. Crying

== Chart positions ==
Chart (1982)	Peak position
Australia (Kent Music Report)	2

== Certifications ==
Region	Certification	Certified units/sales
Australia (ARIA)	Platinum	50,000^{^}
^{^} Shipments figures based on certification alone.
