= And I Love You So =

And I Love You So may refer to:

- "And I Love You So" (song), 1970 song by Don McLean
- And I Love You So (Shirley Bassey album), 1972 album by Shirley Bassey
- And I Love You So (Perry Como album), 1973 album by Perry Como
- And I Love You So (Don McLean album), 1989 album by Don McLean
- And I Love You So (film), 2009 film
- And I Love You So (TV series), 2015 television drama series
