= Christmas Dream (disambiguation) =

Christmas Dream may refer to:

- "Christmas Dream", a 1974 song by Andrew Lloyd Webber and Tim Rice
- A Christmas Dream, a 1945 Czechoslovak short film by Karel Zeman and Bořivoj Zeman
- The Christmas Dream, a 1900 French short film by Georges Méliès

== See also ==
- Christmas Dreams, a 1997 album by Don McLean
