= Eventually =

Eventually may refer to:

== Music ==
=== Albums ===
- Eventually (album), 1996 album

=== Songs ===
- "Eventually", by Ornette Coleman from The Shape of Jazz to Come
- "Eventually", by Pink from Missundaztood
- "Eventually", by Don McLean from And I Love You So
- "Eventually", by The Naked Brothers Band from I Don't Want to Go to School
- "Eventually", by Tame Impala from Currents
- "Eventually", by Beach Bunny from Emotional Creature
- "Eventually" (The Wildhearts song)

== Other uses ==
- Eventually (mathematics), a mathematical concept
