= Love Tracks =

Love Tracks may refer to:

- Love Tracks (Don McLean album), 1987
- Love Tracks (Gloria Gaynor album), 1978
