= River of Love (disambiguation) =

"River of Love" is a 2008 song by George Strait.

River of Love may also refer to:

- "River of Love" (Rick Price song), 1995
- River of Love, an album by David Foster, or its title song, 1990
- "River of Love", a song by Lynch Mob from Wicked Sensation, 1990
- "River of Love", a song by Juice Newton from Juice_(Juice_Newton_album), 1981
- "River of Love", a song by T-Bone Burnett from T-Bone Burnett, 1986
- The River of Love (album), by Don McLean, 1995
- The River of Love (1960 film), an Egyptian film
