= Socialite Evenings =

- Author: Shobha De
- Language: English
- Genre: Novel
- Publisher: Penguin Books
- Publication date: 1989
- Publication place: India
- Media type: Print (Paperback)
- ISBN: 0-14-012267-2
- OCLC: 21599147
- LC Class: MLCS 89/00052 (P)
- Followed by: Starry Nights

Socialite Evenings (1989) is Shobha De's first novel. It describes Mumbai high society and explores the lives of bored, rich housewives trapped in loveless marriages and engaging in ill-fated extramarital affairs, smug selfish husbands who use their wives more for social respectability than for love, fashionable parties, false spiritual leaders, and a portrait of the general moral, spiritual and intellectual bankruptcy and decadence of the elite who have traded their traditional culture for Westernization and materialism.

== Plot summary ==
Karuna, the main protagonist and narrator, seeks a more glamorous wealthy lifestyle than that of her traditional, middle-class background. She pursues a career as a model, through which she meets the socialite Anjali. Following Anjali's model, Karuna marries a wealthy man. However, she finds that she is not satisfied living with her husband, who has little consideration for her. She has an affair with her husband's friend, and eventually divorces him. She writes successful memoirs, and achieves a measure of fame and pride in herself as she becomes an active socialite and eventually uses her newfound prominence as a celebrity to get herself a position as an advertising copywriter and creator of a television series.

The novel's storyline parallels Shobha De's own rise to fame and appeared to be partially autobiographical.

== Reception ==
Socialite Evenings received poor reviews at its release, with complaints that it relied too much on racy content without satisfying substance. In the years since its first publication, scholars have studied it as an example of women's oppression, especially in the realm of marriage.

== Release details ==
- 1989, India, Penguin, New Delhi ISBN 0-14-012267-2, Pub date ? ? 1989, paperback
- 1995, India, Penguin, New Delhi ISBN ?, Pub date ? ? 1995, paperback (as part of The Shobha De Omnibus)
