= Thumbs Up (song) =

2019 single by Momoland

Single by Momoland
- Released: December 30, 2019
- Recorded: 2019
- Genre: K-pop; dance-pop
- Length: 3:18
- Label: MLD Entertainment; Kakao M
- Composers: Duble Sidekick; Bull$EyE; Ondine; De view; Kim Do Da Ri
- Lyricists: Duble Sidekick; Bull$EyE; Ondine; De view; Kim Do Da Ri
- Producers: De view; Bull$EyE; Ondine

Momoland singles chronology
"Pinky Love" (2019)	"Thumbs Up" (2019)	"Starry Night" (2020)

Music video
- "Thumbs Up" on YouTube

"Thumbs Up" is a song recorded by South Korean girl group Momoland. It was released on December 30, 2019, by MLD Entertainment and distributed by Kakao M as the group's single from their second single album of the same name. The track was written by Duble Sidekick, Bull$EyE, Ondine, De view and Kim Do Da Ri, with De view, Bull$EyE and Ondine credited as producers.

The accompanying music video for the song was uploaded onto 1theK's YouTube channel simultaneously with the single's release. To promote the single, the group performed on several South Korean music show programs, such as M Countdown and Inkigayo. Commercially, "Thumbs Up" peaked at number one hundred thirty-seven on South Korea's Gaon Digital Chart and at number four on the Gaon Album Chart.

== Composition ==
"Thumbs Up" is a dance-pop song. It was composed and written by Duble Sidekick, Bull$EyE, Ondine, De view and Kim Do Da Ri. De view, Bull$EyE and Ondine served as the producers.

== Background and release ==
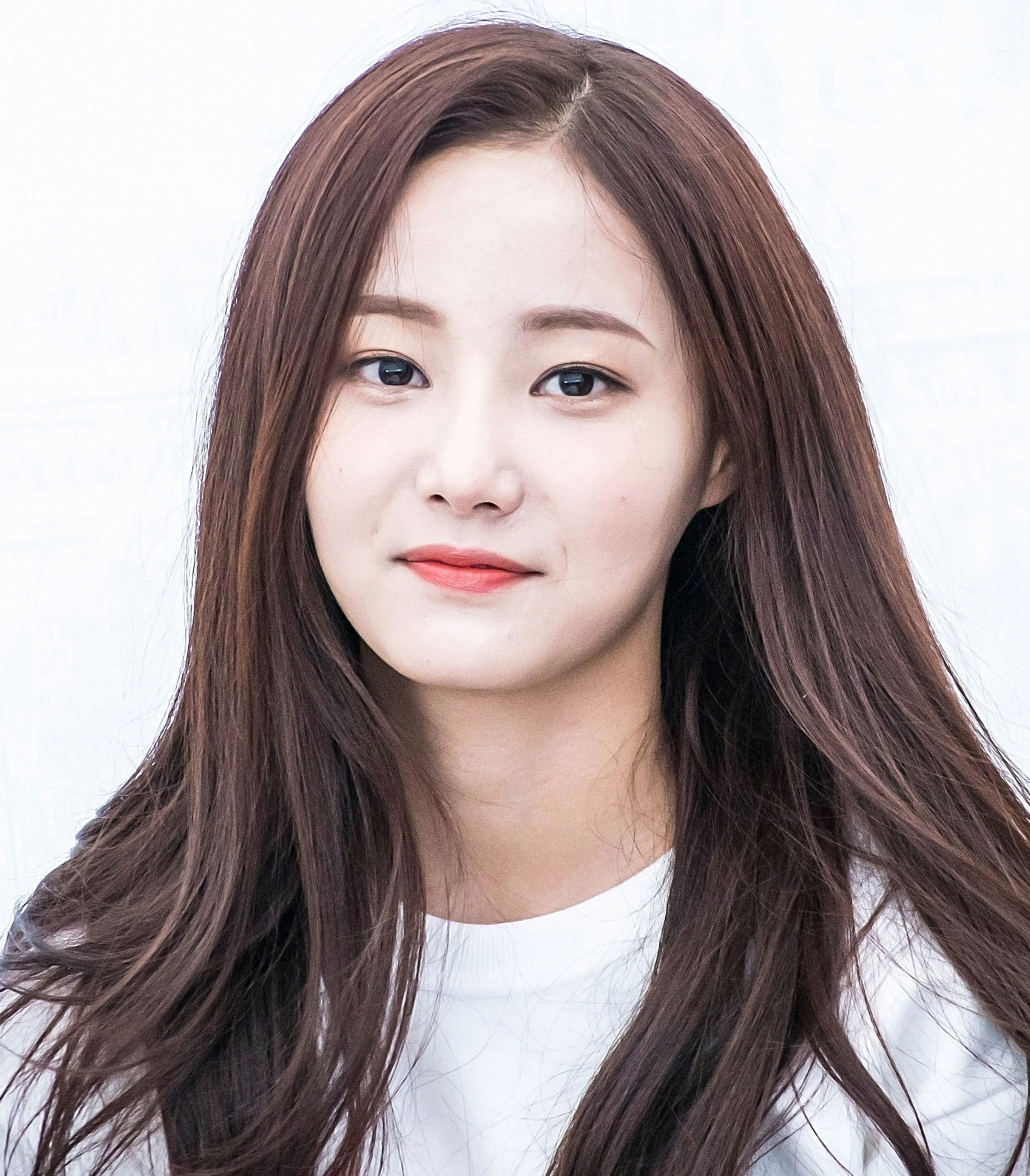
"Thumbs Up" serves as the group's first Korean-language single not to feature Yeonwoo (pictured in 2016).

Momoland as a seven-member group, released the song "I'm So Hot" from their fifth extended play Show Me in April 2019. Following the release of "I'm So Hot", the group's studio album Chiri Chiri and the six-member single "Pinky Love" were released in Japan in September 2019. On November 29, 2019, members Yeonwoo and Taeha had officially left the group. On December 10, 2019, MLD Entertainment announced that the group will return as a six-member group at the end of the year. While Daisy was still in discussion about her contract. On December 12, it was announced that the group will release a single album titled Thumbs Up with the single of the same name on December 30, 2019. The song was stated to have a "newtro" sound and "will show a new image" for the group.

Prior to the release of "Thumbs Up", teasers featuring photos of Momoland from the single album's photoshoot, and clips from the music video were released online in December 2019. The song was officially released on December 30, 2020, by MLD Entertainment and distributed by Kakao M as the group's second single album. An English version, a remix and an instrumental of "Thumbs Up" were included in the single album. The dance practice video was uploaded on January 16, 2020.

== Critical reception ==
Seoul Beats described the song as "obvious shift for the group, away from blatant carnival fun towards a more retro, glam and sophisticated look and feel." The Kraze Magazine stated the song "showcased" the identity of the group – "an energetic, hard-working group of women while giving a re-introduction."

== Commercial performance ==
In South Korea, "Thumbs Up" debuted and peaked at number one hundred thirty-seven on the Gaon Digital Chart for the week ending January 4, 2020, making it the fourth song from Momoland to enter the chart. The single album debuted at number four on the Gaon Album Chart for the week ending January 4, 2020. In its second week, the album dropped to number sixty-seven and to number seventy-five in its third week. In its fourth and final week, the album dropped to number one hundred. It was the forty-first most selling album on the Gaon Album Chart for the month of January 2020 with 5,688 copies sold.

== Music videos ==
A scene in the music video where Momoland's Jane appears as a delivery worker for Momo Express.

The music video for "Thumbs Up" was uploaded to 1theK's official YouTube channel on December 30, 2019, in conjunction with the release of the single. The video features the group playing two sets of characters: express delivery workers and showgirls. Seoul Beats criticized the choreography calling it "disappointing, simple and repetitive" and that it was "clearly made to be viral." The Kraze Magazine stated the group "delivered" in the choreography, adding that it was "simple and easy to follow."

A "performance" version of the music video was published on January 3, 2020.

== Live performances ==
Momoland promoted "Thumbs Up" by performing on several music programs in South Korea including Inkigayo, M Countdown, Music Bank, Show! Music Core and Simply K-Pop.

== Track listing ==
Digital download / streaming
No.	Title	Lyrics	Music	Arrangement	Length
1.	"Thumbs Up"	Duble Sidekick; Bull$EyE; Ondine; De view; Kim Do Da Ri	Duble Sidekick; Bull$EyE; Ondine; De view; Kim Do Da Ri	De view; Bull$EyE; Ondine	3:18

Thumbs Up - single album
No.	Title	Lyrics	Music	Arrangement	Length
1.	"Thumbs Up"	Duble Sidekick; Bull$EyE; Ondine; De view; Kim Do Da Ri	Duble Sidekick; Bull$EyE; Ondine; De view; Kim Do Da Ri	De view; Bull$EyE; Ondine	3:18
2.	"Thumbs Up" (English version)	Duble Sidekick; Bull$EyE; Keepintouch; Ondine; De view; Kim Do Da Ri	Duble Sidekick; Bull$EyE; Ondine; De view; Kim Do Da Ri	De view; Bull$EyE; Ondine	3:18
3.	"Thumbs Up" (S2 & SJ Remix)	Duble Sidekick; Bull$EyE; Ondine; De view; Kim Do Da Ri	Duble Sidekick; Bull$EyE; Ondine; De view; Kim Do Da Ri	Kang Min Kyu; Lee Shin Jae	3:30
4.	"Thumbs Up" (instrumental)		Duble Sidekick; Bull$EyE; Ondine; De view; Kim Do Da Ri	De view; Bull$EyE; Ondine	3:18
Total length:					13:24

== Charts ==
Chart performance for "Thumbs Up"
Chart (2019–2020)	Peak position
South Korea (Gaon Album Chart)	4
South Korea (Gaon Digital Chart)	137
South Korea (K-pop Hot 100)	83
US World Digital Songs (Billboard)	13

== Accolades ==
=== Music programs wins ===
Music program wins for "Thumbs Up"
Program	Network	Date
M Countdown	Mnet	January 9, 2020

== Credits and personnel ==
Credits adapted from Melon.

- Momoland – vocals
- Duble Sidekick – composer, lyricist
- Bull$EyE – composer, lyricist, arrangement
- Ondine – composer, lyricist, arrangement
- De view – composer, lyricist, arrangement
- Kim Do Da Ri – composer, lyricist

== Release history ==
Release dates and formats for "Thumbs Up"
Region	Date	Format	Label
Worldwide	December 30, 2019	Digital download; streaming	MLD Entertainment; Kakao M

== See also ==
- List of M Countdown Chart winners (2020)
