= Shobhaa De =

Indian novelist, columnist (born 1948)

Shobha De
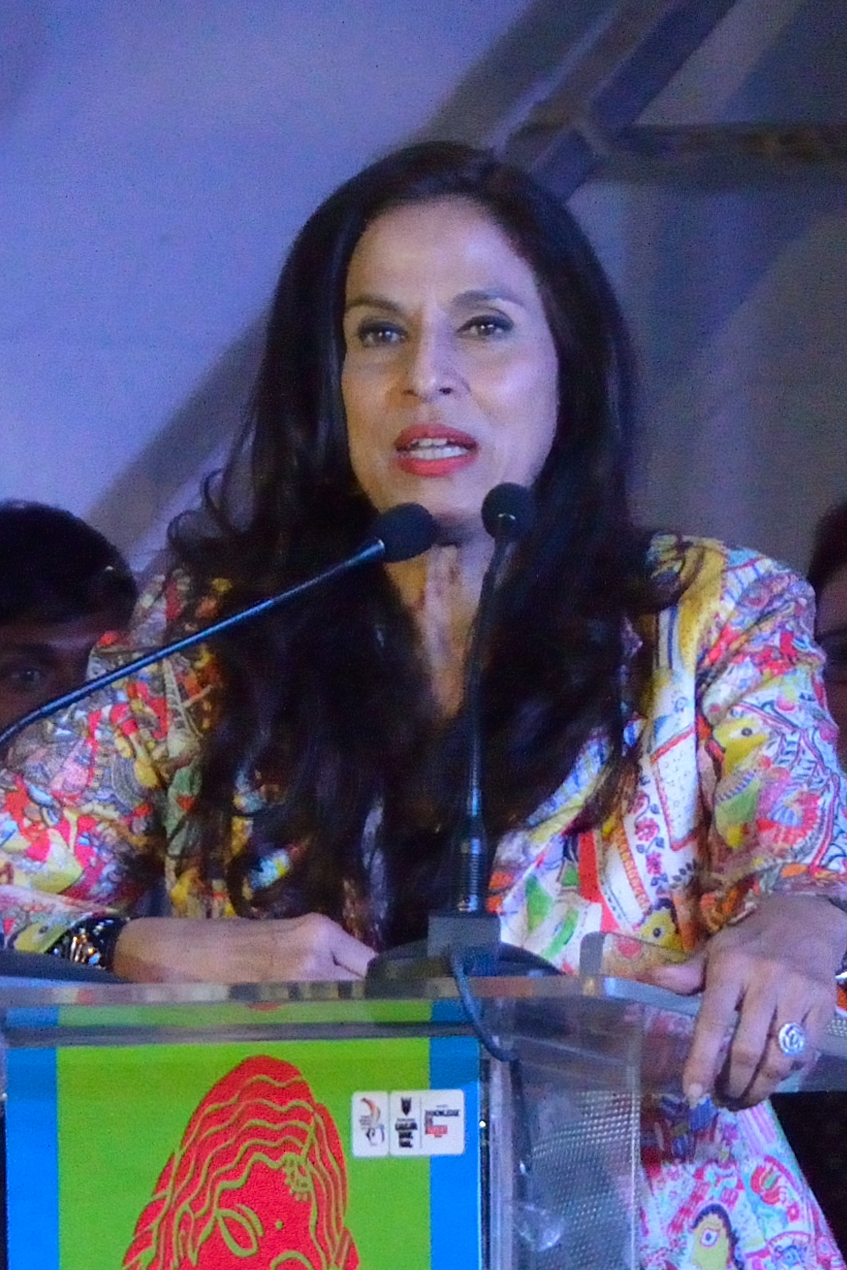
- De at an event in 2015
- Born: Shobha Rajadhyaksha; 7 January 1948 (age 78); Satara District, Province of Bombay, Dominion of India (present-day Maharashtra, India)
- Occupations: Author; columnist; novelist
- Spouse(s): Sudhir Vrajlal Kilachand; Dilip De
- Children: 6

Shobha De (née Rajadhyaksha, formerly Kilachand; born 7 January 1948) is an Indian novelist and columnist. She is best known for her depiction of socialites and sex in her works of fiction, for which she has been referred to as the "Jackie Collins of India."

== Early life and education ==
Shobhaa De was born on 7 January 1948 in the Satara district of Maharashtra and was brought up in Bombay (now Mumbai), in a Marathi family. Her father was a district court judge, and her mother was a homemaker. The youngest of four siblings, she has two sisters and a brother. She studied at the Queen Mary School, Mumbai. She then graduated in Psychology from St. Xavier's College, Mumbai.

== Career ==
At age 17, she began her career as a model, which lasted for five years. At age 20, she began her career as a journalist, writing "agony aunt" advice columns and features for society magazines. She was the editor of the magazine Stardust from 1971, which included Bollywood interviews, gossip, and photographs.

In the 1980s, she contributed to the Sunday magazine section of The Times of India. She has since been a regular columnist for several newspapers. She has also written several popular soaps on television.

Ankita Shukla wrote for The Times of India, in 2016, that "unignorable has been Shobhaa De's unabashed description of the womenfolk in her novels. De's women range from traditional, subjugated and marginalized to the extremely modern and liberated women. De's novels take a leaf the urban life and represent realistically an intimate side of urban woman's life, also revealing her plight in the present day society." In 1992, Mark Fineman of the Los Angeles Times described her as "India's hottest-selling English-language novelist," and how her second novel, Starry Nights (1991), had "a drawing of a nude woman on the front cover," and according to De, "they said it was the first time they’d broken through the ‘F’ barrier, the first time they’d run the F-word without asterisks." Urmee Khan writes for The Guardian in 2007, "Her books are steeped in a lifetime's observation of Bollywood," and "They describe a side of the country that western audiences rarely encounter, her central themes being power, greed, lust and sex."

In 2010, De and Penguin Books created the publishing imprint Shobhaa De Books.

De has also participated in several literary festivals, including the Bangalore Literature Festival, having been part of it since its first edition.

== Personal life ==
De has been married twice, and is a mother of six children with six grandchildren.

After graduation, Shobha married Sudhir Vrajlal Kilachand of the Kilachand Marwari business family, with whom she has a son and a daughter. The marriage ended in divorce.

Shobha then married Dilip De, a Bengali businessman in the shipping industry, with whom she has two daughters. Dilip also has two children from his previous marriage.

== Books ==
- Srilaaji – Diary of a Marwari Matriarch, Simon & Schuster (2020)
- Lockdown Laisons (2020)
- Small Betrayals − Hay House India, New Delhi, 2014
- Seventy And to Hell with It (2017)
- Shobhaa: Never a Dull De − Hay House India, New Delhi, 2013
- Shethji −2012
- Shobhaa at Sixty −Hay House India, New Delhi, 2010
- Sandhya's secret −2009
- Superstar India – From Incredible to Unstoppable
- Strange Obsession
- Snapshots
- Spouse: The truth about marriage (2005)
- Speedpost – Penguin, New Delhi. 1999.
- Surviving Men – Penguin, New Delhi, 1998
- Selective Memory – Penguin, New Delhi. 1998.
- Second Thoughts – Penguin, New Delhi. 1996.
- Small betrayals – UBS Publishers' Distributors, 1995
- Shooting from the hip – UBS, Delhi, 1994.
- Sultry Days – Penguin, New Delhi. 1994.
- Sisters – Penguin, New Delhi. 1992.
- Starry Nights – 1989, India, Penguin, New Delhi ISBN 0-14-012267-2, Pub date ? ? 1989, paperback
- Socialite Evenings – 1989, India, Penguin, New Delhi ISBN 0-14-012267-2, Pub date ? ?

== See also ==
- Indian literature
- List of Indian writers
