= Terri Sharp =

American songwriter and singer (born 1948)

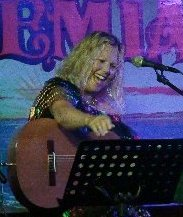
- Sharp performing in 2010

Background information
- Born: March 24, 1948
- Origin: Houston, Texas, United States
- Died: December 17, 2015 (aged 67)
- Genres: Pop, adult contemporary, country, Spanish
- Occupation(s): Singer, songwriter
- Instrument(s): Vocals, guitar
- Years active: 1966–2015

Terri Sharp (March 24, 1948 – December 17, 2015) was an American songwriter and singer. While writing on Music Row in Nashville, Sharp's songs were recorded by many artists including Don Mclean and Hank Williams Jr. She lived in Texas, composing and performing the majority of her work in Spanish.

== Early career ==
Sharp's 1966 recording of her song "A Love That Will Last" stayed on the charts for three months in her hometown of Houston, Texas. She then moved to New Orleans, Louisiana in 1967 to record for White Cliff Records. There she met her arranger Allen Toussaint, who became a lifelong friend.

== The Nashville scene ==
Sharp did three tours of duty as a songwriter on Music Row in Nashville, Tennessee. During that time, she wrote for Bocephus Music and had the distinction of being the only writer that Hank Williams Jr. ever signed to his Bocephus publishing company. She then wrote for Merle Kilgore's Paradise Cove Music for two years, before signing on with Acuff-Rose.

Sharp was awarded a gold record for the song "Wild Streak", which she co-wrote with Hank Williams Jr. The song was also used as the title of Williams' 1987 album and tour. Around the same time, two of Terri's songs ("Eventually" and "You Can't Blame the Train") were recorded by Don Mclean for his 1987 album Love Tracks. The latter reached No. 49 on the U.S. country charts in 1987 and is also featured on Mclean's 1993 compilation album Favorites and Rarities. Sharp co-wrote the song "Old-Fashioned Broken Heart" with Donny Kees, which was recorded by Lisa Stewart on her self-titled 1993 album. In Don Mclean's 2007 biography, Terri Sharp is referred to as "one of the most talented songwriters on the Nashville scene".

== Recent activity ==
Sharp has hundreds of songs to her credit. She wrote and performed in the San Antonio area of Texas. The majority of her later work was composed and performed in Spanish, adding ever more depth to her intelligent, melodic songwriting and vocal style.

== Discography ==
=== Albums featuring ===
- 1987: Wild Streak - Hank Williams Jr.
- 1987: Love Tracks - Don Mclean
- 1993: Favorites and Rarities - Don Mclean

=== Compositions ===
- 1966: "A Love That Will Last"
- 1985: "Are You Looking for Me?"
- 1986: "Sea of Cortez"
- 1986: "Out of the Blue"
- 1986: "Smokin' Gun"
- 1987: "Stark Ravin' Crazy"
- 1987: "The Piper's Song"
- 1987: "Wild Streak" - co-written with Hank Williams Jr. (Wild Streak)
- 1987: "You Can't Blame the Train" - Don Mclean (Love Tracks, Favorites and Rarities)
- 1987: "Eventually" - Don Mclean (Love Tracks)
- 1992: "Perfect Common Stone"
- 1993: "Old-Fashioned Broken Heart" - co-written with Donny Kees
- 1997: "Taken with You" - written about her friend Don Mclean and his wife

=== Compositions in Spanish ===
- 2000: "A la larga"
- 2001: "Me andas buscando a mi?"
