= Speedpost (book) =

1999 book by Shobhaa De

- Author: Shobha De
- Language: English
- Genre: Essay
- Publisher: Viking Books
- Publication date: 1999
- Publication place: India

Speedpost is a book written in 1999 by Shobha De. The book is a series of letters to her six children, either grown, or nearly so. The subjects she approaches through the medium of letters include: growing pains and adolescent anxieties about love, sex and friendship; religion and God; the challenge of being a responsible parent, death, remembrance and family traditions, the place of career, sex and of values in the lives of her children.
