= Starry Night (Millet) =

Painting by Jean-François Millet

- Nuit Étoilée (French)
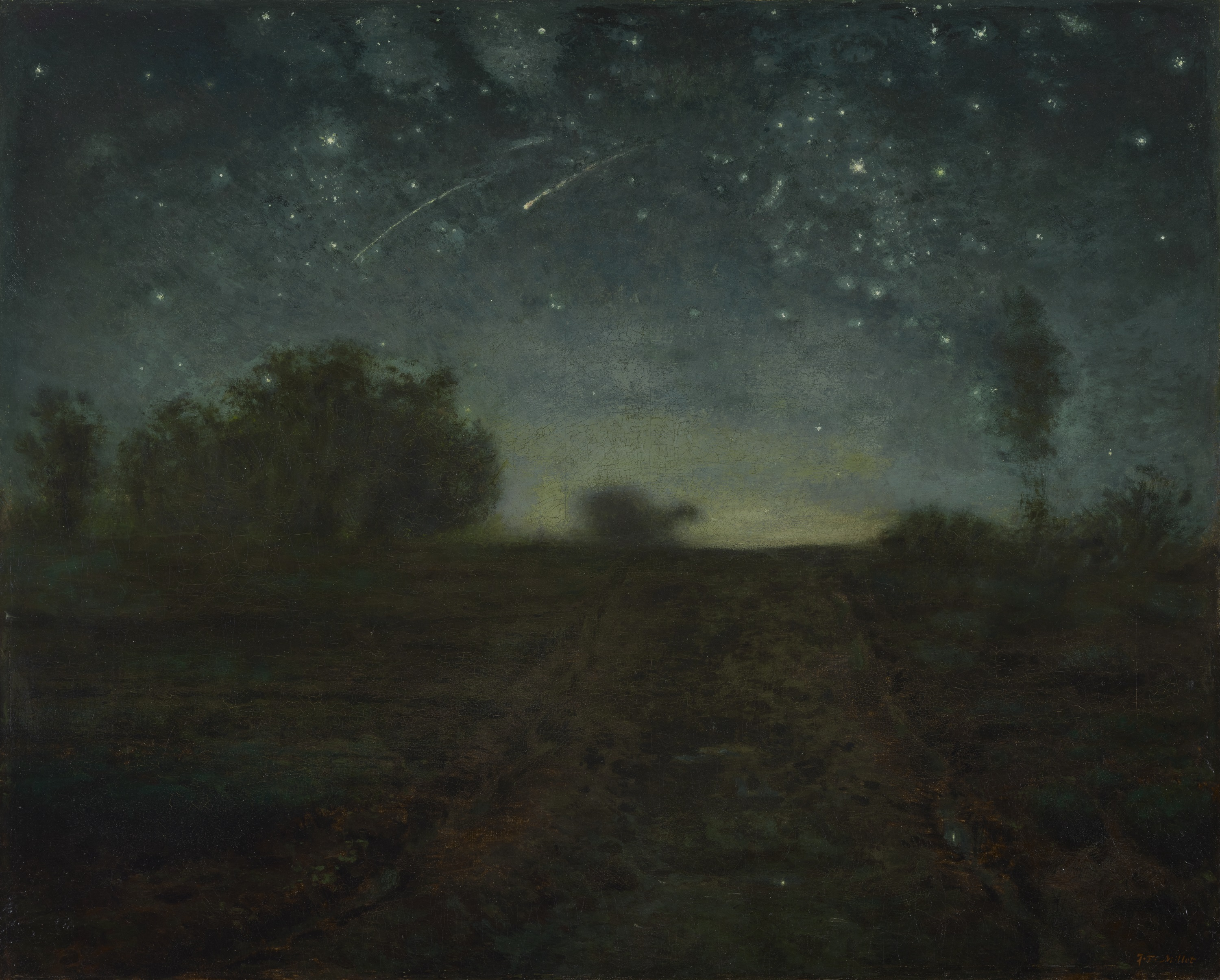
- Artist: Jean-François Millet
- Year: c. 1850–1865
- Medium: Oil on canvas
- Movement: realism
- Dimensions: 65.4 cm × 81.3 cm (25.75 in × 32 in)
- Location: Yale University Art Gallery, New Haven

Starry Night is an oil-on-canvas painting by Jean-François Millet completed in 1850 and retouched in 1865. One of Millet's few paintings that is exclusively a landscape, it is in Yale University Art Gallery, in New Haven.

== History ==
In 1849, Millet left Paris, a city that he had lived in for almost a decade. He moved to Barbizon, a small village on the edge of the Fontainebleau forest in the northern part of the center of France, due to a cholera outbreak and political and social unrest caused by the Revolutions of 1848.

However, it was not until after his death in 1875 when it appeared on the markets. It first appeared in Hôtel Drouot, a famous auction house in Paris, on May 10-11, 1875. It later surfaced again in Galerie Goupil, a leading art dealership in France in the 19th century that specialized in auctioning off paintings and sculptures. From 1878 onwards, it was in the possession of George Lillie Craik and his descendants. Craik was a Scottish writer and literary critic who lived in London at the time of this acquisition. The painting was passed throughout his family, eventually ending up with J.S. Knapp Fisher. From him, it was purchased by the Yale University Art Gallery through the use of the Leonard C. Hanna, Jr., Class of 1913 fund. It is now in their permanent collection.

== Composition ==
One of Millet's students, Edward Wheelwright, wrote that, according to Millet, "Every landscape, however small, should contain the possibility of being indefinitely extended on either side; every glimpse of the horizon should be felt to be a segment of the great circle that bounds out vision...". Millet executed Starry Night with this philosophy in mind. He did so over the span of two years, painting a darkened path lit up by a star-filled night sky. In the foreground, there is a dark, almost black expanse of grass and dirt. The middle ground is complete with some dark green trees and shrubs and the remainder of the canvas shows a sky showered with stars and different hues of green and blue. There is a horizon near the center of the canvas, shown through a light green pigment that blends away into a darker blue color. The silhouette of a cart is in this horizon, contrasting sharply from the rest of the lighter colors in the sky.

The sky is mostly astronomically accurate. Millet greatly enjoyed looking up at the stars, especially when in Barbizon; in a letter to his brother, he wrote, "If only you knew how beautiful the night is ... the calm and grandeur of it are so awesome that I find that I actually feel overwhelmed." This love for nighttime provided him with a solid base of memories and direct observations of the night sky to paint from, meaning that his paintings of night landscapes had skies with mostly accurate constellations and stars. This style of painting a night sky contrasted greatly from most other artists of his time, who would paint night skies with bright dot-like stars that were not seen anywhere in the real sky and organized in made up constellations. Instead, in Starry Night, he included parts of real constellations, such as the sword of Orion and Canis Major. In fact, according to Dr. Martin Beech, a professor of astronomy at Campion College at the University of Regina, "the season during which Nuit Étoilée is set can possibly be dated with some accuracy." It is also possible that Millet observed the shooting stars he painted in the sky in a meteor shower known as the Orionids. This meteor shower is active during the month of October and would indicate that the light green horizon is the sun rising, not setting. There is, however, one inaccuracy with Millet's sky; at the edge of the three stars that make up Orion's belt, a star that is usually faint is represented as quite vibrant. It is possible that this is a reference to the origins of the Orionid meteor shower occurring at that time, as these meteors seem to radiate from the constellation Orion.

== Exhibitions ==
From March 2 to June 8, 2008, Starry Night was displayed in the National Gallery of Art in an exhibition called "In the Forest of Fontainebleau: Painters and Photographers from Corot to Monet". This was a show formulated around paintings, photographs, prints and drawings that depicted the forest in Fontainebleau, France. In addition to Millet, it included artists such as Claude Monet, Gustave LeGray, and Théodore Rousseau.

== Legacy ==
Although the two artists never met, Vincent van Gogh was hugely influenced by Millet. In his early years, van Gogh painted numerous copies of Millet's works that pertained to peasants, such as The Sower, and was in awe of his style and technique. Although he had probably heard of Millet's Starry Night, there is no evidence that van Gogh ever saw it before painting one of his own in the same name.

Claude Monet and Camille Pissarro – two Impressionist painters who were active in the late 19th and early 20th century – were also significantly influenced by Millet's landscape paintings. However, there is no record that they were directly influenced by Millet's Starry Night.
