= Sings Marty Robbins =

Studio album by Don McLean
- Released: 2001
- Genre: Country
- Length: 45:13
- Label: Madacy

Don McLean chronology
Christmas Dreams (1997)	Sings Marty Robbins (2001)	Starry Starry Night (2001)

Professional ratings
Review scores
Source	Rating
Allmusic	3.5/5 stars

Don McLean Sings Marty Robbins is the fifteenth studio album by American singer-songwriter Don McLean, released in 2001. It consists of songs written by or recorded by country music singer-songwriter Marty Robbins.

== Track listing ==
1. "Singing the Blues" (Melvin Endsley) – 2:22
2. "Kaw-Liga" (Fred Rose, Hank Williams) – 2:56
3. "Among My Souvenirs" (Edgar Leslie, Horatio Nicholls) – 4:25
4. "Don't Worry 'Bout Me" (Marty Robbins) – 4:58
5. "Ribbon of Darkness" (Gordon Lightfoot) – 2:42
6. "The Story of My Life" (Burt Bacharach, Hal David) – 3:05
7. "El Paso" (Robbins) – 5:30
8. "I Can't Quit" (Robbins) – 2:31
9. "Love Me" (Jeanne Pruett) – 4:31
10. "Devil Woman" (Robbins) – 4:51
11. "Time Goes By" (Robbins) – 2:49
12. "You Gave Me a Mountain" (Robbins) – 4:33
