= Addicted to Black =

Studio album by Don McLean
- Released: May 2009
- Genre: Folk rock
- Length: 43:54
- Label: Don McLean Records
- Producer: Don McLean, Pat Severs, Mike Severs

Don McLean chronology
Rearview Mirror: An American Musical Journey (2005)	Addicted to Black (2009)	Botanical Gardens (2018)

Addicted to Black is the nineteenth studio album by singer-songwriter Don McLean, released in May 2009. It is his first album of original material in 14 years.

== Track listing ==
All tracks are written by Don McLean, except "Lovers Love the Spring", poem by William Shakespeare.

Addicted to Black
No.	Title	Length
1.	"Addicted to Black"	4:23
2.	"Run, Diana Run"	5:52
3.	"Beside Myself"	2:49
4.	"Mary Lost a Ring"	3:26
5.	"Lovers Love the Spring"	2:45
6.	"Promise to Remember"	3:47
7.	"The Three of Us"	4:10
8.	"Shadowland"	3:46
9.	"I Was Always Young"	5:01
10.	"This Is America (Eisenhower)"	3:41
11.	"In a Museum"	4:14
Total length:		43:54

== Personnel ==
- Don McLean – vocals, acoustic guitar, five-string banjo
- Pat Severs – acoustic, electric, dobro and steel guitars
- Mike Severs – electric and acoustic guitars, ukulele, additional drum and keyboard programming
- Mark Prentice – electric bass
- Hank Singer – fiddle
- Jerry Kroon – drums on "Mary Lost a Ring"

Production

- Don McLean – producer
- Pat Severs – producer, engineering, mastering
- Mike Severs – producer, engineering, mastering
- Phyllis Arnett Dumond – art direction
- Keith Perry – CD disc photo
- Patrisha McLean – back booklet photo

== Release history ==
Region	Date	Label	Format	Catalog
United States	May 2009	Don McLean Records	stereo CD	
United States	April 19, 2010	Proper Records	stereo CD	
