= Rearview Mirror: An American Musical Journey =

Studio album by Don McLean
- Released: 2005
- Genre: Rock
- Label: Hyena Records

Don McLean chronology
Christmastime! (2004)	Rearview Mirror: An American Musical Journey (2005)	Addicted to Black (2009)

Professional ratings
Review scores
Source	Rating
Allmusic	3.5/5 stars

Rearview Mirror: An American Musical Journey is the eighteenth studio album by American singer-songwriter Don McLean, released in 2005.

== Track listing ==
1. If You Could Read My Mind
2. Vincent (Starry, Starry Night)
3. Wonderful Baby
4. Love Me Tender
5. (It Was) A Very Good Year
6. El Paso
7. My Saddle Pals and I
8. And I Love You So
9. Crying
10. Empty Chairs
11. Homeless Brother
12. TB Blues
13. Magdalene Lane
14. Infinity
15. Prime Time
16. American Pie
17. Run, Diana Run
18. You've Got to Share

== Notes ==
- "If You Could Read My Mind" composed by Gordon Lightfoot
- "Love Me Tender" composed by George R. Poulton and Ken Darby, credited to Vera Matson and Elvis Presley
- "(It Was) A Very Good Year" composed by Ervin Drake
- "El Paso" composed by Marty Robbins
- "My Saddle Pals and I" composed by Roy Rogers
- "Crying" composed by Joe Melson and Roy Orbison
- "TB Blues" composed by Jimmie Rodgers
