= The Western Album =

Studio album by Don McLean
- Released: 2003
- Length: 40:03
- Label: Don McLean Records

Don McLean chronology
You've Got to Share: Songs for Children (2003)	The Western Album (2003)	Christmastime! (2004)

Professional ratings
Review scores
Source	Rating
Allmusic	3.5/5 stars

The Western Album is the seventeenth studio album by American singer-songwriter Don McLean, released in 2003.

== Track listing ==
1. "Timber Trail" (Tim Spencer) – 3:01
2. "Ridin' Down the Canyon" (Gene Autry, S. Burnett) – 2:13
3. "Pal O' Mine" (Bob Nolan) – 2:18
4. "I Ride an Old Paint" (Public Domain) – 2:53
5. "I've Got Spurs (That Jingle)" (Lilley, Frank Loesser) – 2:47
6. "The Trail to Mexico" (Public Domain) – 4:03
7. "Blue Prairie" (Nolan, Tim Spencer) – 2:59
8. "The Wild West Is Where I Wanna Be" (T. Lehrer) – 4:21
9. "Tulsa Time/Deep in the Heart of Texas" (Public Domain, M. Walkins) – 4:10
10. "Lyndon Has a Bear Hug on Dallas" (Don McLean) – 3:26
11. "(Take Me Back to My) Boots and Saddles" (Powell, Samuels, Whitcup) – 3:38
12. "Song of the Bandit" (Bob Nolan) – 3:03
13. "Philadelphia Lawyer" (Woody Guthrie) – 3:36
14. "I'm an Old Cowhand" (Johnny Mercer) – 2:02
15. "Sioux Indians" (Public Domain) – 3:53
16. "My Saddle Pal and I" (Rogers) – 1:40
