= Starry Night (Momoland song) =

2020 single by Momoland

Single by Momoland

from the EP Starry Night
- Language: Korean
- Released: June 11, 2020
- Recorded: 2020
- Studio: 821 Sound (Seoul)
- Genre: K-pop
- Length: 3:11
- Label: MLD Entertainment; Kakao M
- Composers: Bull$EyE; real-fantasy; Ondine; Kim Do Da Ri
- Lyricists: Bull$EyE; real-fantasy; Ondine; Kim Do Da Ri; Momoland
- Producers: Bull$EyE; real-fantasy; Ondine

Momoland singles chronology
"Thumbs Up" (2019)	"Starry Night" (2020)	"Ready or Not" (2020)

Music video
- "Starry Night" on YouTube

"Starry Night" is a song recorded by South Korean girl group Momoland. It was released on June 11, 2020 by MLD Entertainment and distributed by Kakao M as the lead single of their sixth extended play of the same title. The track was written by Bull$EyE, real-fantasy, Ondine, Kim Do Da Ri and Momoland. Bull$EyE, real-fantasy and Ondine produced the song.

The accompanying music video for the song was uploaded onto 1theK's YouTube channel simultaneously with the single's release. Commercially, "Starry Night" peaked at number 160 on South Korea's Gaon Download Chart.

== Composition ==
"Starry Night" is a dance-pop song. It was composed and written by Bull$EyE, real-fantasy, Ondine and Kim Do Da Ri. Momoland were also credited as lyricists, marking it the first writing credit of the group. Bull$EyE, real-fantasy and Ondine served as the producers. For the English version of the song, keepintouch was credited for the lyrics instead of Momoland. The track is described as a "city pop dance song about wanting to confess on a starry night." It was composed using 4/4 common time in the key of C♯ and D♭, with a tempo of 113 beats per minute, and runs for three minutes and 11 seconds.

== Background and release ==
Momoland as a six-member group, released the song "Thumbs Up" from their second single album of the same name in December 2020. Following "Thumbs Up", MLD Entertainment announced in May 15, 2020, that Momoland would be making their comeback in June 2020.

Prior to the release of "Starry Night", teasers featuring photos of Momoland from the extended play's photoshoot, and a snippet of the song were released online in June 2020. The song was officially released on June 11, 2020 by MLD Entertainment and distributed by Kakao M as the group's lead single of their sixth extended play of the same title. An English version and the instrumental of the song were included in the group's 2018 extended play of the same title.

== Critical reception ==
Misa of Motto Korea described the song of "someone who hesitates to confess feelings under a starry night sky." Kristine Chan of The Kraze Magazine called the song a "city pop track that is perfect for a summer night." Ilse Van Den Heede of The K Meal labeled it a "soft pop song with some funky instrumentation."

== Commercial performance ==
In South Korea, "Starry Night" debuted and peaked in the Gaon Download Chart at number 160 on the week of June 13, 2020.

== Music video ==
A scene in the music video where Momoland's JooE appears in the vertically shot scene of the video.

The music video for "Starry Night" was uploaded to 1theK's official YouTube channel on June 11, 2020, in conjunction with the release of the single. The video was shot vertically. Cara Emmeline Garcia of GMA Network described the music video to be "reminiscent of polaroid photos designed with stickers" in a pic-nic like setting.

== Track listing ==
Digital download / streaming
No.	Title	Lyrics	Music	Arrangement	Length
1.	"Starry Night"	Bull$EyE; real-fantasy; Ondine; Kim Do Da Ri; Momoland	Bull$EyE; real-fantasy; Ondine; Kim Do Da Ri	Bull$EyE; real-fantasy; Ondine	3:11

== Charts ==
Chart performance for "Starry Night"
Chart (2020)	Peak position
South Korea (Gaon BGM Chart)	98
South Korea (Gaon Download Chart)	160

== Credits and personnel ==
Credits adapted from Melon.

- Momoland – vocals, lyrics
- Bull$EyE – lyrics, composer, arrangement
- Kim Chae-won – chorus, guitar, recorder
- Kim Do Da Ri – lyrics, composer
- Ondine – lyrics, composer, arrangement
- real-fantasy – drums, programming, lyrics, composer, arrangement, keyboard
- Team AMG – mixing
- Kwon Nam Woo – mastering

== Release history ==
Release dates and formats for "Starry Night"
Region	Date	Format	Label
Worldwide	June 11, 2020	Digital download; streaming	MLD Entertainment; Kakao M
