= You've Got to Share Songs for Children =

You've Got to Share: Songs for Children

Studio album by Don McLean
- Released: July 27, 2004
- Genre: Children’s music
- Label: Don McLean

Don McLean chronology
Starry Starry Night (2001)	You've Got to Share: Songs for Children (2004)	The Western Album (2003)

You've Got to Share: Songs for Children is the sixteenth studio album by American singer-songwriter Don McLean, released in 2003.

== Track listing ==
1. Little Rooster
2. Be Kind to your Parents
3. You've got to Share
4. This Old Man
5. Windy Old Weather
6. I'm an Old Cowhand
7. The Eagle
8. You have no right (solo Jackie McLean)
9. Luby Lu
10. The Cat came Back
11. The Horse Named Bill
12. Pick it up
13. Hush Little Baby
14. Blackberry Blossom
15. Birdies Three (A la Volette)
16. Where Have All the Flowers Gone?
17. Going to the Chapel/Goodnight Sweetheart

== Notes ==
- "Be Kind to your Parents" composed by Harold Rome
- "I'm an Old Cowhand" composed by Johnny Mercer
- "Pick it up" composed by Woody Guthrie
- "Birdies Three (A la Volette)" composed by A. Kevess
- "Where Have All The Flowers Gone" composed by Pete Seeger
- "Going to the Chapel/Goodnight Sweetheart" composed by Barry, Carter, Greenwich, Hudson and Spector
