= Starry Nights =

1991 novel by Shobhaa De

- Author: Shobha De
- Original title: Starry Nights
- Cover artist: Sunil Sil (cover design), Gautam Rajadhyaksha (cover and author photographs)
- Language: English
- Genre: Novel
- Publisher: Penguin Books
- Publication date: 1991
- Publication place: India
- Media type: Print (Paperback)
- Pages: 234 pp
- ISBN: 0-14-015456-6
- OCLC: 27082797
- Dewey Decimal: 823 20
- LC Class: PR9499.3.D4 S56 1991
- Preceded by: Socialite Evenings
- Followed by: Shooting From the Hip

Starry Nights is Shobha De's second novel. It was a best seller in India and cemented its authors reputation as being a provocative and daring author. The novel's frank portrayal of the sexploitation and intrigue of Bollywood contributed to its success.

== Plot summary ==
The protagonist of the book is Aasha Rani, a dark, chubby girl from Madras who has striven for seven years to become a famous Bollywood starlet. Her mother, Amma, has pushed her to attain this status by selling herself into the world of blue films before she was twelve years old, and when she was fifteen to Kishenbhai, a once-famous producer who was encouraged by Amma to take her as a lover in exchange for a film role. Kishenbhai, unable to secure a role for her any other way, finances a film with his own money after promoting her as the newest Bollywood starlet and having her sleep with the appropriate people to secure her attention and renaming her from Viji to Aasha Rani. He then proceeds to fall madly in love with her, who abandons him as she strives to get ahead in the filmi world, fully aware that she was just being used by him at first and is thus unable to return the affection of the older man.

She falls in love with Akshay Arora, a famous Bollywood sex symbol who stars in a string of hits with her. Amma, who had been living with her in Mumbai, was sent away to Madras by Aasha for objecting to Akshay beating her one day. Eventually Akshay gets bored with her and after his wife confronts her unsuccessfully about her affair with her husband, he reveals to Showbiz magazine that she was a former pornographic actress, and effectively has her blackballed from making further films. When she accosts him at a society party about this, he beats her. Sheth Amirchand, a Member of Parliament and the gangster that controls most of the Mumbai underworld, then takes an interest in Aasha Rani and she becomes his lover and restarts her career under his protection. She then has an affair with Linda, a gossip columnist for Showbiz magazine and Abhijit Mehra, the son of an industrialist, who is about to be married. Linda advises her to go to the south and do an art film, which she does, where she tries to seduce the director only to find that he is impotent. Her interest in her work declines as she continue to obsess over Akshay Arora. She confronts him at a traffic light as their cars are next to each other and their affair is rekindled for a short time. She attempts to get Akshay to marry her, but when it becomes apparent that his interest in her is only due to his flagging stardom and not out of affection for her, she attempts suicide.

Her lesbian lover Linda, meanwhile, writes a juicy scoop on her suicide attempt. After she recovers she rekindles her affair with Abhijit Mehra, but Malini, Akshay's wife, reports this to his father and he has his weak-willed son Abhijit cut the affair off and sends Aasha to New Zealand with instructions to keep out of Abhijit's life. Aasha then retires to New Zealand and decided to leave the film business. She marries a New Zealander named Jamie Phillips (Jay) and has a child with him. Since Jay is not Indian and not in the film business, it occurs to her that she does not have to retire once she is married as is the custom in India. It is then revealed that Akshay has succumbed to AIDS as a result of his promiscuous lifestyle. Sudha Rani claims that Jay tried to seduce her and in revenge, Aasha Rani initiates an affair with Jojo, the producer of her next film.

Aasha Rani is forced out of the film industry by Jojo's wife, who sends goondahs to threaten her. She flies back to New Zealand and meets a man called Gopalakrishnan who she has sex with in the bathroom of the plane. She discovers that her husband is having an affair with her babysitter and they decide that their marriage is over. Her daughter, Sasha rejects her and begins to have her own identity crisis as a multiracial child. Aasha then meets a young lady named Shonali who she begins to spend a lot of time with. She is a London socialite and call girl and introduces Aasha to London High Society. At a party, Aasha notices Gopalakrishnan, the man she had sex with on the flight to London. He turns out to be an arms dealer. She accosts him and later he has an assassin quartered at her house and threatens to have her daughter murdered if she tells. Shonali murders the assassin and ushers Aasha Rani out of the country.

Sudha Rani has meanwhile had a film financed by the mob and she begins to doctor the books instead of repaying her debts. The gangsters have her assaulted by some thugs and they set her on fire. Sudha Rani is badly burned and is forced out of the film industry, and Aasha reconciles with her. As Appa weakens, he reveals that he has kept position of a studio that Aasha can use to support herself by preparing her daughter, Sasha, to take her place as Bollywood's next starlet.

== Characters ==
- Aasha Rani, (Viji Iyengar), the South Indian protagonist.
- Akshay Arora, a famous Bollywood heartthrob and libertine, Aasha's lover.
- Kishenbhai, has-been film producer, Aasha's jilted lover.
- Malini Arora, Akshay's wife.
- Shethji, (Sheth Amirchand), a Mumbai gangster and M. P.
- Amma, (Geetha Devi), Aasha's mother and madam.
- Linda, a gossip columnist and Aasha's lesbian lover.
- Abhijit Mehra, son of an industrialist and Aasha's lover.
- Jamie (Jay) Phillips, Aasha's husband from New Zealand.
- Sudha Rani, Aasha's younger sister.
- Appa, Aasha's alcoholic father, a former Kollywood film producer.
- Jojo (Jitendra) Mehta, film producer and Aasha's lover.
- Gopalakrishnan, arms dealer and Aasha's lover.
- Shonali Leclerc, a socialite call-girl whom Aasha met in London.
- Sasha, Aasha's daughter.

== Release details ==
- 1991, India, Penguin, New Delhi ISBN 0-14-015456-6, Pub date ? ? 1991, paperback
- 1995, India, Penguin, New Delhi ISBN ?, Pub date ? ? 1995, paperback (as part of The Shobha De Omnibus)
