= Headroom (Don McLean album) =

Studio album by Don McLean
- Released: 1991
- Genre: Rock
- Length: 37:36
- Label: Curb
- Producer: Dave Burgess, Don McLean

Don McLean chronology
And I Love You So (1989)	Headroom (1991)	Christmas (1991)

Professional ratings
Review scores
Source	Rating
AllMusic	3.5/5 stars

Headroom is the eleventh studio album by American singer-songwriter Don McLean, released in 1991.

== Track listing ==
All songs written by Don McLean.

1. "Headroom"
2. "Fashion Victim"
3. "1967"
4. "Infinity"
5. "One in a Row"
6. "You Who Love the Truth"
7. "Lady in Waiting"
8. "Have You Seen Me"
9. "Siamese Twins (Joined at the Heart)"
10. "A Brand New World"
