= Starry, Starry Night (album) =

Starry, Starry Night (LIVE)

Live album by Don McLean
- Released: 2001
- Genre: Rock
- Label: Madacy
- Producer: Don McLean

Don McLean chronology
Sings Marty Robbins (2001)	Starry, Starry Night (LIVE) (2001)	You've Got to Share: Songs for Children (2003)

Professional ratings
Review scores
Source	Rating
Allmusic	3/5 stars

Starry, Starry Night is a live album by American singer-songwriter Don McLean, released in 2001. The album was recorded in Austin, Texas, at The Paramount Theatre on November 2, 1999, as part of a PBS special called Don McLean, Starry, Starry Night.

The song "Vincent" is a tribute to the artist Vincent van Gogh and references his masterpiece The Starry Night.

== Track listing ==
1. "Every Day"
2. "La La Love You"
3. "Homeless Brother"
4. "If We Try"
5. "Winterwood"
6. "Crossroads"
7. "Castles in the Air"
8. "Tulsa Time/Deep in the Heart of Texas"
9. "Castles in the Air" [Retake]
10. "Angry Words"
11. "My Love Was True"
12. "Singin' the Blues"
13. "You Gave Me a Mountain"
14. "Crying"
15. "And I Love You So" (duet with Nanci Griffith)
16. "Raining in My Heart" (duet with Nanci Griffith)
17. "Jerusalem"
18. "You're My Little Darlin'"
19. "American Pie"
20. "Superman's Ghost"
21. "Fashion Victim"
22. "Headroom/Dreidel"
23. "It Was a Very Good Year"
24. "Vincent (Starry, Starry Night)"

== Notes ==
- "Every Day" composed by Buddy Holly and Norman Petty
- "Tulsa Time" composed by Danny Flowers
- "Deep in the Heart of Texas" composed by Geraint Watkins
- "Singin' the Blues" composed by Melvin Endsley
- "You Gave Me a Mountain" composed by Marty Robbins
- "Crying" composed by Joe Melson and Roy Orbison
- "Raining in My Heart" composed by Boudleaux Bryant
- "It Was a Very Good Year" composed by Ervin Drake

All other songs by Don McLean
