= Second Thoughts (Shobhaa De novel) =

1996 novel by Shobhaa De

- Author: Shobha De
- Language: English
- Genre: Novel
- Publisher: Penguin Books
- Publication date: 1996
- Publication place: India
- Media type: Print (Paperback)
- Pages: 296
- ISBN: 0-14-025567-2
- OCLC: 35152014
- Dewey Decimal: 823 21
- LC Class: PR9499.3.D4 S43 1996
- Preceded by: Small Betrayals
- Followed by: Selective Memory

Second Thoughts is a novel by Shobhaa De.

== Synopsis ==
Second Thoughts is a love story about Maya, a pretty girl who is eager to escape her dull, middle-class home in Calcutta for the glamour of Mumbai, where she moves after marriage to Ranjan, a handsome, ambitious man who has an American university degree and a wealthy family background.

Maya is determined to be the ideal wife, but finds herself trapped and stifled by the confines of her arranged marriage to a man who, she discovers, is rigidly conservative and completely indifferent to her desires. She begins to experience great loneliness in suburban Mumbai.

She strikes up a friendship with Nikhil, her charming, college-going neighbor, leading to love and betrayal.
