= You Can't Blame the Train =

1987 song by Don McLean

"You Can't Blame the Train" is a song written by American singer-songwriter Terri Sharp. The original version was recorded by American singer-songwriter Don McLean in 1987 and family country group The Hollanders recorded their own version in 1991.

== Don McLean version ==
"You Can't Blame the Train"

Single by Don McLean

from the album Love Tracks
- B-side: "Perfect Love"
- Released: October 1987
- Genre: Country
- Length: 3:07
- Label: Capitol
- Songwriter: Terri Sharp
- Producer: Dave Burgess

Don McLean singles chronology
"He's Got You" (1987)	"You Can't Blame the Train" (1987)	"Love in My Heart" (1988)

"You Can't Blame the Train" was recorded by Don McLean in 1987, and was released as the lead single from his ninth studio album Love Tracks (1988). The song was produced by Dave Burgess.

McLean would also record another Sharp-penned song, "Eventually", for the same album. Sharp recalled in 2012 of how McLean came to record the two tracks, "I was signed by Hank Williams Jr. to Bocephus Music in 1987 because of 'You Can't Blame the Train' and 'Eventually', which Don would also record. Dave Burgess was the administrator for my and Hank's catalogue and he was producing a record for Don – that's how the recording happened."

After having no record contract for five years, McLean returned with his ninth studio album Love Tracks in 1988. "You Can't Blame the Train" was released as the album's lead single in 1987 and reached number 49 on the Billboard Hot Country Singles chart. Commenting on the song's appearance on the charts, along with the follow-up single "Love in My Heart", McLean told the Milwaukee Journal in 1988, "Two songs from the LP are already on the country charts, so we are starting to crack the country charts, which is not an easy thing to do. There is a lot of competition."

=== Writing ===
Sharp wrote "You Can't Blame the Train" in 1986. In 2012, she recalled,

"I wrote the song when I was on the way to a gig in Rosenberg, Texas by a Southern Pacific train. The trains in Texas take very long. During the journey the level crossing gate was coming down and there was a little red car in front of me. They scooted under the gate and got across the tracks. I was amazed and also very happy I hadn't had to watch a tragedy. As the journey was long I had time to write the song; I usually find paper or napkins in my car when a song starts "coming". I thought that if the train had hit the little red sports car the family would have probably tried to sue Southern Pacific, but it wouldn't have been the train's fault. I then came up with the song's chorus: "When the gates are all down and the signals are flashing and the whistle is screaming in vain..." etc. I then thought about how I tried to blame some of my personal woes with men on the men, but then I applied the railway theory and voila... I had to get off the damn tracks in that way also."

=== Critical reception ===
On its release, Billboard wrote, "The normally reflective McLean delivers this little essay on self-destruction with cynically energetic abandon; sharp hook and a pronounced beat." Cash Box listed the single as one of their "feature picks" during October 1987. They commented, "McLean has had a hard time gaining radio acceptance with his recent singles, but that should change with this release! This is a well-written tune on which McLean turns in an excellent country vocal performance. Pay special attention to the clever lyrics, if you can concentrate past Don's fine effort."

In 1997, The Daytona Beach News-Journal commented how McLean had "meandered between roots rock and R&B" with the song. In a retrospective review of Love Tracks, Jim Esch of AllMusic noted the song "rollicks along with some verve".

=== Track listing ===
7" single

1. "You Can't Blame the Train" - 3:07
2. "Perfect Love" - 3:22

7" single (US promo)

1. "You Can't Blame the Train" - 3:07
2. "You Can't Blame the Train" - 3:07

=== Personnel ===
- Don McLean - vocals
- Dave Burgess - producer
- Joe Bogan - engineer, mixing
- Gary Paczosa - assistant engineer

=== Charts ===
Chart (1987)	Peak position
US Billboard Hot Country Songs	49

== The Hollanders version ==
"You Can't Blame the Train"

Single by The Hollanders

from the album Family Ties
- Released: 1991
- Genre: Country
- Length: 3:22
- Label: VCA Records
- Songwriter: Terri Sharp
- Producer: Dave Burgess

The Hollanders singles chronology
"I Know a Little" (1990)	"You Can't Blame the Train" (1991)

"You Can't Blame the Train" was covered by American Nashville music group The Hollanders in 1991, who released their version on VCA Records as a single from their album Family Ties. Like McLean's version, the Hollanders' recording was also produced by Dave Burgess. The song reached number 36 on the Cash Box Country Singles chart.

A music video was filmed to promote the single which won the People's Choice Award. The video showed footage of members of the band singing the song at a train station as well as footage of the band performing the song on stage.

=== Critical reception ===
On its release, Cash Box listed the single as one of their "indie feature picks" during March 1991. They commented, "With an electrifying contemporary country flavor, 'You Can't Blame the Train' spits out racing energy, unique sibling harmony and lyrics which defend the often accused party of a break-up."

=== Track listing ===
7" single

1. "You Can't Blame the Train" - 3:22
2. "You Can't Blame the Train" - 3:22

=== Personnel ===
- Susie - banjo, bass guitar, vocals
- Janet - lead guitar, vocals
- Terri - drums, vocals
- Brenda - keyboards, vocals
- Jeff - instruments
- David - fiddle
- Dave Burgess - producer

=== Charts ===
Chart (1991)	Peak position
US Cash Box Country Singles	36

== Other cover versions ==
- Writer Terri Sharp later recorded her own version of the song, which appeared on YouTube in 2011.
- In 2014, Heather Dickson worked alongside Sharp to record her album Eventually, which featured a cover version of "You Can't Blame the Train", along with other Sharp compositions such as "Eventually".
