= The River of Love (album) =

Studio album by Don McLean
- Released: 1995
- Genre: Rock
- Length: 34:32
- Label: Curb

Don McLean chronology
Christmas (1991)	The River of Love (1995)	Christmas Dreams (1997)

Professional ratings
Review scores
Source	Rating
Allmusic	2.5/5 stars

The River of Love is the thirteenth studio album by American singer-songwriter Don McLean, released in 1995.

== Track listing ==
All songs by Don McLean.

1. "The River of Love"
2. "You're My Little Darlin'"
3. "If I Hadn't Met You"
4. "Better Still"
5. "You Got a Way About You, Baby"
6. "Angry Words"
7. "This Little Girl (Daddy-O)"
8. "Planet Noise"
9. "From a Beautiful Star"
10. "Little Cowboy"
11. "My Love was True"
