= Love Tracks (Don McLean album) =

Studio album by Don McLean
- Released: 1988
- Genre: Country
- Length: 30:43
- Label: Capitol
- Producer: Dave Burgess

Don McLean chronology
Dominion (1982)	Love Tracks (1988)	For the Memories Vols I & II (1989)

Singles from Love Tracks
- 1. "You Can't Blame the Train" Released: October 1987; 2. "Love in My Heart" Released: 1988; 3. "Eventually" Released: 1988

Love Tracks is the ninth studio album by American singer-songwriter Don McLean, released by Capitol in 1988.

Two singles were released from the album. You Can't Blame the Train reached No. 49 on the US Billboard Hot Country Songs in December 1987, while "Love in My Heart" reached No. 65 in August 1988.

== Critical reception ==
Professional ratings
Review scores
Source	Rating
AllMusic	2/5 stars
Billboard	mixed
Cash Box	mixed
Toronto Star (USA)	1/5 stars

Upon release, Cash Box commented: "The man who was the great hope of folk music a decade and a half ago is back but not nearly as eye-opening. Now he's a bit countrified and more than a little corny; but at least he's got Duane Eddy guesting on guitar." Billboard stated: "Missing here are the profound and vivid lyrics that have long been McLean trademarks. Still, the songs are melodic and listenable." In a retrospective review, Jim Esch of AllMusic described the album as "overly slick and dated '80s Nashville production" that "mars this comeback effort by Don McLean". He added: "The obvious intent was to pitch McLean at the mainstream country market, and while he does a credible enough job, McLean's real strength was always his sensitive songwriting."

== Track listing ==
No.	Title	Writer(s)	Length
1.	"Love in My Heart"	Michael Brewer	3:02
2.	"Eventually"	Terri Sharp	2:53
3.	"Dust for Blood"	Don McLean	2:57
4.	"Going for the Gold"	Charles Browder, John W. Ryles	2:46
5.	"What Will the World Be Like"	McLean	2:56
6.	"The Touch of Her Hand"	William Oliver Swofford	3:21
7.	"You Can't Blame the Train"	Sharp	3:09
8.	"It's Not Your Fault"	McLean	2:52
9.	"Everyday Is a Miracle"	McLean	3:07
10.	"Blues Train"	McLean	3:36
