= Christmas (Don McLean album) =

Studio album by Don McLean
- Released: 1991
- Genre: Rock
- Length: 33:45
- Label: Curb
- Producer: Dave Burgess

Don McLean chronology
Headroom (1990)	Christmas (1991)	The River of Love (1995)

Professional ratings
Review scores
Source	Rating
Allmusic	2/5 stars

Christmas is the twelfth studio album by American singer-songwriter Don McLean. The album was released on the Curb Records label.

== Track listing ==
1. "Winter Wonderland" (Felix Bernard, Dick Smith)
2. "O Little Town of Bethlehem" (Phillips Brooks, Lewis H. Redner)
3. "Santa Claus Is Coming to Town" (J. Fred Coots, Haven Gillespie)
4. "I'll Be Home for Christmas/Have Yourself a Merry Little Christmas" (Ralph Blane, Kim Gannon, Walter Kent, Hugh Martin, Buck Ram)
5. "Go Tell It on the Mountain" (Traditional, John Wesley Work II)
6. "Burgundian Carol" (Oscar Brand)
7. "White Christmas" (Irving Berlin)
8. "God Rest Ye Merry Gentlemen" (Traditional)
9. "Pretty Paper" (Willie Nelson)
10. "'Twas the Night Before Christmas"

== Personnel ==
- Don McLean – vocals, arrangements
- Brent Mason – electric guitar
- Biff Watson – acoustic guitar
- Robert Thomas Wray – bass
- Tommy Wells – drums
- Tony Migliore – keyboards, string arrangements
- The Jordanaires – background vocals
