= Christmas Dreams =

Studio album by Don McLean
- Released: 1997
- Genre: Rock, Christmas
- Length: 36:23
- Label: Hip-O
- Producer: Don McLean

Don McLean chronology
The River of Love (1995)	Christmas Dreams (1997)	Sings Marty Robbins (2001)

Professional ratings
Review scores
Source	Rating
Allmusic	3/5 stars
Rolling Stone	(unfavourable)

Christmas Dreams is the fourteenth studio album and the second Christmas album by American singer-songwriter Don McLean, released in 1997.

== Track listing ==
1. "The Christmas Song (Chestnuts Roasting on an Open Fire)" (Mel Tormé, Robert Wells) – 3:39
2. "Oh Holy Night" – 4:20
3. "I Heard the Bells on Christmas Day" (Henry Wadsworth Longfellow) – 3:16
4. "Blue Christmas" (Bill Hayes, Jay Johnson) – 3:52
5. "Christmas Waltz" (Sammy Cahn, Jule Styne) – 3:06
6. "Let It Snow! Let It Snow! Let It Snow!" (Sammy Cahn, Jule Styne) – 2:36
7. "Toyland" (Victor Herbert, Glen MacDonough) – 3:33
8. "On the Last Month of the Year" – 4:20
9. "It Came Upon a Midnight Clear" (Edmund Hamilton Sears, Richard Storrs Willis) – 3:23
10. "Silent Night" (Franz Xaver Gruber, Joseph Mohr) – 4:08

== Personnel ==
- Don McLean - vocals, guitar, arrangements
- Brent Mason - guitar
- Gary Lunn - bass
- Jim Ferguson - bass
- Tony Migliore - piano, string arrangements, synthesizer banjo
- Terry McMillan - percussion
- Dennis Solee - saxophone
- Nashville String Machine - string ensemble
- Bruce Resnikoff - Executive Producer
