= Vincent (Don McLean song) =

1972 song about Vincent van Gogh

- Cover art of UK vinyl release, also used for the US, Italian, Japanese, Portuguese, and New Zealand releases

Single by Don McLean

from the album American Pie
- B-side: "Castles in the Air"
- Released: February 1972
- Genre: Folk rock
- Length: 3:55
- Label: United Artists Records, BGO Records
- Songwriter: Don McLean
- Producer: Ed Freeman

Don McLean singles chronology
"American Pie" (1971)	"Vincent" (1972)	"Dreidel" (1973)

Music videos
- Vincent on YouTube, (Official audio)
- Vincent on YouTube, by Don McLean. Live performance.

Vincent van Gogh's The Starry Night (1889), described in the song

"Vincent" (also released as under the title "Vincent (Starry, Starry Night)") is a song by Don McLean, written as a tribute to Vincent van Gogh. Its commonly known opening lyric, "Starry, Starry Night", is a reference to Van Gogh's 1889 painting The Starry Night.

McLean wrote the lyrics in 1970 after reading a book about the life of Van Gogh. It was released on McLean's 1971 American Pie album; the following year, the song topped the UK Singles Chart for two weeks, and peaked at No. 12 in the United States, where it also hit No. 2 on the Easy Listening chart. Billboard ranked it as the No. 94 song for 1972.

The song makes use mainly of the guitar, but also includes the accordion, marimba, and violin.

A new, longer recording of the song was released in McLean's 1992 album Classics.

In July 2020, the original handwritten lyrics went up for sale for $1.5 million.

== Background ==
McLean said the following about the genesis of the song:

"In the autumn of 1970 I had a job singing in the school system, playing my guitar in classrooms. I was sitting on the veranda one morning, reading a biography of Van Gogh, and suddenly I knew I had to write a song arguing that he wasn't crazy. He had an illness and so did his brother Theo. This makes it different, in my mind, to the garden variety of 'crazy' – because he was rejected by a woman [as was commonly thought]. So I sat down with a print of Starry Night and wrote the lyrics out on a paper bag."

McLean ultimately felt that Van Gogh's symptoms suggested that he was bipolar. The song was first played that night at a high school prom McLean attended.

== Critical reception ==
The Telegraph wrote, "With its bittersweet palette of major and minor chords, "Vincent"'s soothing melody is one of high emotion recollected in tranquillity". Record World called the song "artful", saying that "the Vincent Van Gogh story is told with melody and poetry." Cash Box called it "another of those tunes for people who like to pick apart lyrics and messages. AllMusic retrospectively described the song as "McLean's paean to Van Gogh ... sympathiz[ing] with Van Gogh's suicide as a sane comment on an insane world." The site also said McLean performs "a particularly poignant rendition" of "Vincent" on the 2001 live album Starry, Starry Night.

The song was a particular favorite of the rapper and actor Tupac Shakur, and it was played to him, supposedly on repeat, at the University Medical Center of Southern Nevada, the hospital that he was admitted to just before he died of gunshot wounds from a drive-by shooting.

English musician Jake Bugg credited hearing the song in an episode of The Simpsons as being his formative musical moment.

Canadian ice dance duo Piper Gilles and Paul Poirier created their acclaimed free dance program to a cover of Vincent performed by busker duo Govardo. They debuted the program in the 2018/2019 season and brought it back for their final season in 2025/2026, winning a bronze medal at the 2026 Milano-Cortina Winter Olympics.

== Charts ==
=== Weekly charts ===
Chart (1972)	Peak position
Australia	3
Belgium (Ultratop 50 Flanders)	30
Canada Top Singles	3
Canada Adult Contemporary	13
Italy (FIMI)	1
Germany (Official German Charts)	21
Netherlands (Single Top 100)	16
Ireland (IRMA)	1
New Zealand (Listener)	7
South Africa (Springbok)	6
UK Singles (Official Charts)	1
US Billboard Hot 100	12
US Adult Contemporary (Billboard)	2
US Cash Box Top 100	11

=== Year-end charts ===
Chart (1972)	Rank
Australia	31
Canada	67
UK	11
US Billboard Hot 100	94
US Cash Box	93

== Certifications ==
Region	Certification	Certified units/sales
Canada (Music Canada)	Platinum	80,000^{‡}
New Zealand (RMNZ)	Platinum	30,000^{‡}
United Kingdom (BPI)	Platinum	600,000^{‡}
United States (RIAA)	Platinum	1,000,000^{‡}
^{‡} Sales+streaming figures based on certification alone.

== Cover versions ==
- The song was covered by Josh Groban in 2001; the cover was described by the Financial Times as "overlooking the song's subtler, more soulful elements".
- Ellie Goulding released a cover of the song on Valentine's Day 2018, apologizing to her fans about delays in her recording projects. McLean tweeted Goulding, saying "'Vincent' is not an easy song to sing and you sing it very beautifully." She included her cover in her 2020 Songbook for Christmas EP.
- The song was covered by Lianne Le Havas and played during the ending credits of the 2017 animated film Loving Vincent.
- Henk Poort performed a rendition of "Vincent" during season 12 of Beste Zangers. He sang a Dutch translation written by the Dutch artist Martine Bijl.

== In popular culture ==
Part of the song was used in 2003 The Simpsons episode "'Scuse Me While I Miss the Sky" while residents of Springfield watch a meteor shower that was previously obstructed by light pollution.
