= Crying (Roy Orbison song) =

1961 song by Roy Orbison

Single by Roy Orbison

from the album Crying
- B-side: "Candy Man"
- Published: August 16, 1961 Acuff-Rose Publications, Inc.
- Released: July 1961
- Recorded: June 26, 1961
- Studio: RCA Victor Studio B, Nashville
- Genre: Country
- Length: 2:46
- Label: Monument 447
- Songwriters: Roy Orbison; Joe Melson
- Producer: Fred Foster

Roy Orbison singles chronology
"Running Scared" / "Love Hurts" (1961)	"Crying" (1961)	"Dream Baby (How Long Must I Dream)" (1962)

"Crying" is a song written by the American singer, songwriter, and guitarist Roy Orbison and Joe Melson for Orbison's third album Crying (1962). Released in 1961, it was a number-two hit in the United States for Orbison and was covered in 1978 by Don McLean, whose version reached number one in the United Kingdom in 1980. Orbison later re-recorded the song as a duet with the Canadian singer-songwriter k.d. lang, giving them a number-two hit in Canada.

== Composition ==
Dave Marsh calls the song a "rock-bolero" with "blaring strings, hammered tympani, a ghostly chorus, the gentle strum of a guitar, [and] a hint of marimba". Billboard observes an "expressive reading" on the "country-flavored ballad." The personnel on the original recording included Orbison session regulars Bob Moore on bass; Floyd Cramer on piano; Buddy Harman on drums; and Boudleaux Bryant, Harold Bradley, and Scotty Moore on guitar.

== Release and reception ==
The song was released as a 45-rpm single by Monument Records in mid-July 1961 and reached No. 1 on the United States Cashbox chart for a week on October 7, 1961. On the rival Billboard Hot 100 it peaked at No. 2. Despite not reaching the summit in the latter publication, Billboard ranked the record as the No. 4 song of 1961.

In 2002, "Crying" was honored with a Grammy Hall of Fame Award. In 2010, Rolling Stone ranked it 69th on their list of the "500 greatest songs of all time".

== Charts ==
=== Weekly charts ===
Chart (1961)	Peak position
Canada (CHUM Hit Parade)	3
UK Singles (Official Charts)	25
US Billboard Hot 100	2
US Cash Box Top 100	1

Chart (1992)	Peak position
UK Singles (Official Charts)	13

=== Year-end charts ===
Chart (1961)	Position
US Billboard Hot 100	4

== Certifications ==
Region	Certification	Certified units/sales
United Kingdom (BPI)	Silver	200,000^{‡}
^{‡} Sales+streaming figures based on certification alone.

== Don McLean version ==
"Crying"

Single by Don McLean

from the album Chain Lightning
- B-side: "Genesis (In the Beginning)"
- Released: 1980
- Genre: Country; easy listening
- Length: 3:35
- Label: Millennium
- Songwriters: Roy Orbison; Joe Melson

Don McLean singles chronology
"Since I Don't Have You" (1978)	"Crying" (1980)	"It's Just the Sun" (1981)

Don McLean's recording of the song went to No. 5 on the US Billboard Hot 100 in early 1981. It also reached No. 2 adult contemporary and No. 6 Country. It fared even better in the UK, where it reached No. 1 in 1980, spending three weeks at the top of the UK Singles Chart. "Crying" was taken from his 1978 album, Chain Lightning. It became his second biggest hit in America.

=== Charts ===
==== Weekly charts ====
Chart (1980–1981)	Peak position
Australia (ARIA)	27
Belgium (Ultratop 50 Flanders)	1
Canada Top Singles (RPM)	7
Canada Country (RPM)	1
Ireland (IRMA)	1
Netherlands (Dutch Top 40)	1
New Zealand (New Zealand Singles Chart)	11
South Africa (Springbok)	3
UK Singles (OCC)	1
US Billboard Hot 100	5
US Adult Contemporary (Billboard)	2
US Country (Billboard)	6
US Cash Box Top 100	6

==== Year-end charts ====
Chart (1980)	Rank
Australia	119
Netherlands	5
South Africa	19
UK Singles	15

Chart (1981)	Rank
Canada Top Singles (RPM)	49
US Billboard Hot 100	40
US Cash Box Top 100	52

=== Sales and certifications ===
Certifications for "Crying"
Region	Certification	Certified units/sales
Netherlands (NVPI)	Gold	100,000^{^}
United Kingdom (BPI)	Silver	250,000^{^}
^{^} Shipments figures based on certification alone.

== Roy Orbison and k.d. lang version ==
"Crying"

Single by Roy Orbison and k.d. lang

from the album King of Hearts and Hiding Out soundtrack
- B-side: "Falling"
- Released: 1987
- Length: 3:48
- Label: Virgin
- Songwriters: Roy Orbison; Joe Melson
- Producers: Don Was; David Was; Pete Anderson

Roy Orbison singles chronology
"In Dreams" (1987)	"Crying" (1987)	"Handle with Care" (1988)

k.d. lang singles chronology
"Three Cigarettes in an Ashtray" (1987)	"Crying" (1987)	"Honky Tonk Angels Medley" (1988)

Orbison re-recorded the song as a duet with k.d. lang as part of the soundtrack to the motion picture Hiding Out and released it as a single in 1987. Their collaboration won the Grammy Award for Best Country Collaboration with Vocals. It reached No. 2 in Lang's native Canada, and No. 28 on the Billboard Adult Contemporary chart and No. 42 on the Hot Country Singles chart in the US. In 1992, it reached the charts in the UK and Ireland, peaking at No. 13 on the UK Singles Chart and No. 9 on the Irish Singles Chart. It returned to the US Adult Contemporary chart in 1993, peaking at No. 40.

=== Track listings ===
- 7-inch and cassette single (1987, 1992)
1. "Crying" (with k.d. lang) – 3:48
2. "Falling" – 2:22
- UK CD1 and Australian CD single (1992)
1. "Crying" (with k.d. lang)
2. "Falling"
3. "Oh, Pretty Woman"
4. "She's a Mystery to Me"
- UK CD2 (1992)
1. "Crying" (with k.d. lang)
2. "Falling"
3. "Only the Lonely"
4. "It's Over"

=== Charts ===
==== Weekly charts ====
Chart (1988)	Peak position
Canada Top Singles (RPM)	2
Canada Adult Contemporary (RPM)	5
Canada Country Singles (RPM)	25
New Zealand (Recorded Music NZ)	47
US Adult Contemporary (Billboard)	28
US Hot Country Songs (Billboard)	42

Chart (1992–1993)	Peak position
Australia (ARIA)	71
Europe (Eurochart Hot 100)	36
Ireland (IRMA)	9
UK Singles (Official Charts)	13
UK Airplay (Music Week)	13
US Adult Contemporary (Billboard)	40

==== Year-end charts ====
Chart (1988)	Position
Canada Top Singles (RPM)	45

=== Release history ===
Region	Date	Format(s)	Label(s)	Ref.
United States	November 1987	7-inch vinyl	Virgin	
Canada	November 1987	7-inch vinyl	Virgin	
Australia	February 1988	7-inch vinyl	Virgin	
United Kingdom	August 10, 1992	7-inch vinyl; CD1; cassette	Virgin	
United Kingdom	August 17, 1992	CD2	Virgin	
Australia	October 5, 1992	CD; cassette	Virgin	
Japan	November 18, 1992	Mini-CD	Virgin	

== Notable cover versions ==
- A version by Jay and the Americans reached No. 25 in the US in 1966.
- Three other cover versions made country music charts over time. Charting with the song were:
  - Arlene Harden (No. 28 in 1970),
  - Ronnie Milsap (No. 79 in 1976)
  - Stephanie Winslow (No. 14 in 1980).
- Rebekah Del Rio performed an a cappella Spanish language version of the song entitled "Llorando" in the 2001 David Lynch film Mulholland Drive.
- Hugh Jackman sang the first verse and final chorus karaoke-style in the Australian comedy Paperback Hero.
