= Kim Tae-rin =

South Korean actress (born 1998)

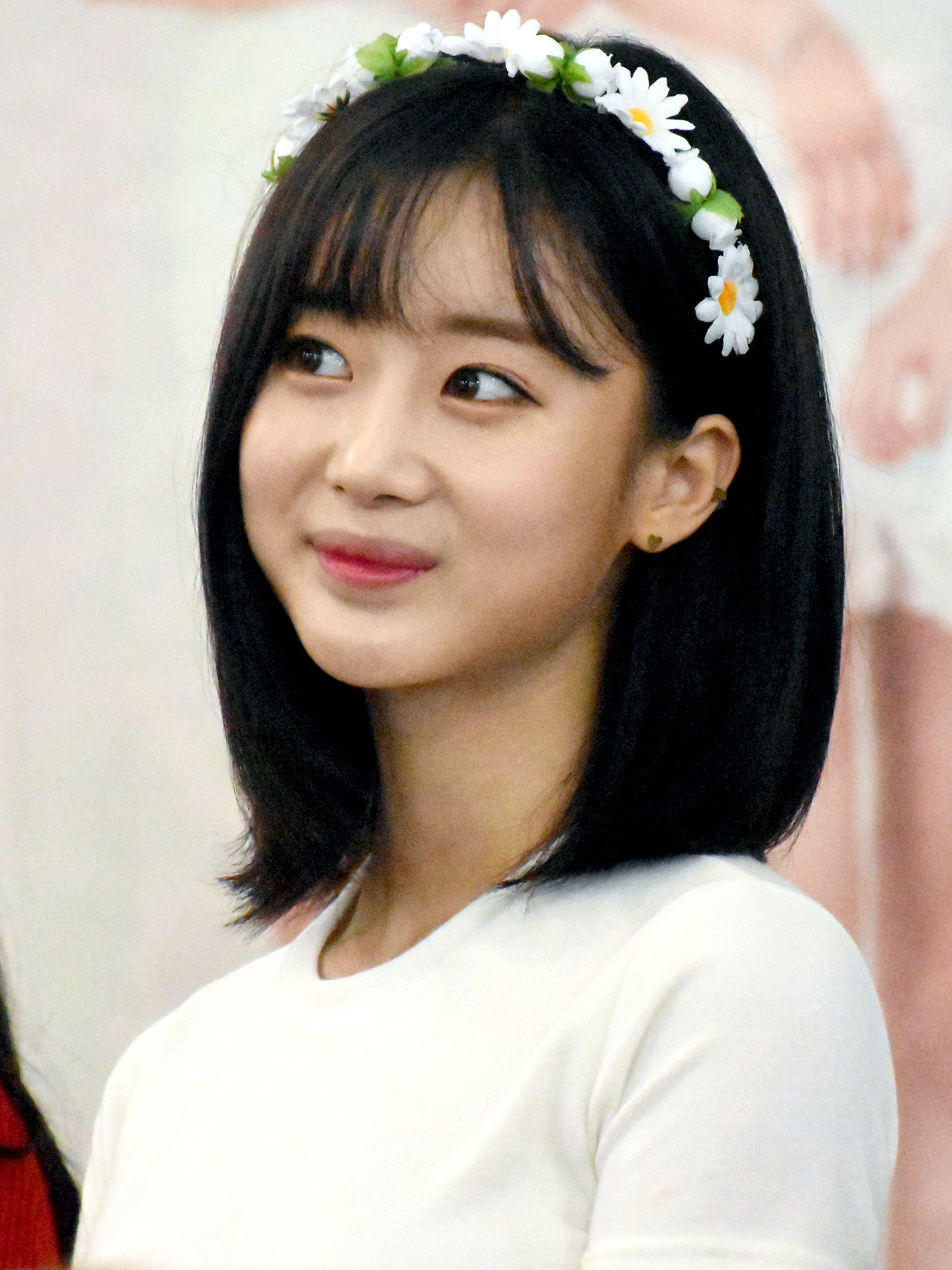
- Kim in 2018
- Born: Kim Hyun-jung; February 25, 1998 (age 28); Seoul, South Korea
- Education: Dongduk Women's University – Department of Broadcasting and Entertainment
- Alma mater: School of Performing Arts Seoul
- Occupations: Actress; singer
- Years active: 2015–present
- Agent: SAA Company
- Musical career
- Genres: K-pop
- Instrument: Vocals
- Years active: 2015–2019
- Label: JTG
- Formerly of: Berry Good

Korean name
- Hangul: 김현정
- RR: Gim Hyeonjeong
- MR: Kim Hyŏnjŏng

Stage name
- Hangul: 김태린
- RR: Gim Taerin
- MR: Kim T'aerin

Kim Tae-rin (Korean: 김태린; born Kim Hyun-jung on February 25, 1998), formerly known as Daye, is a South Korean actress and former singer. She is a former member of the South Korean girl group Berry Good.

== Early life and education ==
Kim was born on February 25, 1998, in Seoul, South Korea. She has a younger brother. She attended School of Performing Arts Seoul and graduated in February 2017. She got accepted into the Department of Broadcasting and Entertainment at Dongduk Women's University.

== Career ==
Kim decided to become a singer while living with her grandmother, who knew trot. After one year of idol training, she was introduced as a member of Berry Good on January 26, 2015. She debuted with the second single album Because of You, which was released on February 9. On June 10, she was cast in MBC every1 variety show Her Secret Weapon.

On March 21, 2017, she made her acting debut in the LG's short promotional video Coffee Bread, which premiered at LG's G6 18:9 Vertical Film Festival. The same year, she participated in JTBC's survival show Mix Nine. However, she was eliminated in episode 10 and ranked 32nd.

On May 16, 2019, it was announced that Kim would not participate in Berry Good's comeback for their third mini-album Fantastic, for health reasons.

On September 25, 2023, it was announced that Kim signed an exclusive contract with O Entertainment and she will promote as an actress under the stage name Kim Tae-rin. On August 8, 2024, Kim was cast in her first television drama role, playing Shim Jin-hwa in Dear Hyeri.

== Personal life ==
=== Bullying allegations ===
In 2019, an individual identified as Ms. A claimed that she was bullied by Kim while they were attending Bukseoul Middle School. Her agency denied it and Kim announced that she would take legal action for defamation, subsequently leaving Berry Good and retiring from the entertainment industry to study abroad. She filed a lawsuit in 2020, and three years later the court fined Ms. A 2 million won for posting false facts, threatening, and inflicting mental pain to Kim.

== Filmography ==
=== Film ===
Year	Title	Role	Notes	Ref.
2017	Coffee Bread	Girl	Short film, credited as Kim Hyun-jung (Daye)	

=== Television series ===
Year	Title	Role	Ref.
2024	Dear Hyeri	Shim Jin-hwa	

=== Television shows ===
Year	Title	Role	Notes	Ref.
2015	Her Secret Weapon	Cast member	Episode 1−5	
2017	Mix Nine	Contestant	Finished 32nd	
