= Begin A Game =

2018 South Korean television show

- Genre: Game show
- Starring: Kim Jun-hyun; Kim Hee-chul; Shindong; Guillaume Patry; Gongchan; Johyun
- Country of origin: South Korea
- Original language: Korean
- No. of episodes: 8

Original release
- Network: MBC
- Release: November 2 – December 21, 2018

Begin A Game (Korean: 비긴 어 게임) is a 2018 South Korean game program in which its guests will play games and share stories of past memories relating to said game. It airs every Friday night at 12:55 KST.

== Host ==
- Kim Jun-hyun
- Kim Hee-chul (Super Junior)
- Shindong (Super Junior)
- Guillaume Patry
- Gongchan (B1A4)
- Johyun (Berry Good)

== List of episodes and ratings ==
In the table below, the blue numbers represent the lowest ratings and the red numbers represent the highest ratings.

Episode #	Air Date	Guest(s)	AGB Nielsen ratings
1	November 2, 2018	Jang Dong-min, Hong Min-ki	1.7%
2	November 9, 2018	Eddy Kim, Parc Jae-jung	1.7%
3	November 16, 2018	Lee Chun-soo, Thunder, Heo Il-hu	1.6%
4	November 23, 2018	Yu Minsang	1.5%
5	November 30, 2018	Moon Bin, Yoon San-ha, KZ Deft (Kim Hyuk-kyu), KT Mata (Cho Se-hyeong), KT Score (Go Dong-bin)	1.1%
6	December 7, 2018	Choi Hyun-seok	2.3%
7	December 14, 2018	fromis 9 (Park Ji-won, Lee Na-gyung), Moon Ho Joon	1.6%
8	December 21, 2018	DIA (Eunchae, Somyi), ROX Dragons Knee (Bae Jae-min)	1.5%
