= HNB (band) =

2017–2019 South Korean boy band

- Origin: Seoul, South Korea
- Genres: K-pop
- Years active: 2017–2019
- Labels: Happy Face
- Members: See List of members

HNB was a South Korean pre-debut boy band formed by Happy Face Entertainment in 2017.

== History ==
Park Woo-dam, Woo Jin-young, Jo Yong-geun and Jeong Won-cheol participated in the Mnet survival series Produce 101 Season 2 in 2017. Woo-dam and Jin-young placed 35th and 40th respectively while Yong-geun and former trainee Won-cheol placed 93rd and 95th respectively. The four later teamed as the pre-debut team HNB (HappyFace Next Boy) released digital single "I'm Your Light" on June 26, 2017 as special gift for their fans who supported them during Produce 101. On July 7, it was announced that Jeon Won-cheol was eliminated from HNB project.

Park Woo-dam, Woo Jin-young, Jo Yong-geun, Kim Hyun-soo and other Happy Face trainees participated as representative of male trainee in the JTBC survival series Mix Nine in September 2017. Woo Jin-young, Jo Yong-geun, Kim Hyun-soo. Jin-young placed 1st, becoming members of the winner boy group while the group's debut were announced to be cancelled after unsuccessful contract negotiation of the survival show agency with the winner contestant respective agencies. Hyun-soo and Yong-geun placed 14th and 25th respectively.

Jin-young and Hyun-soo released special EP Present on June 14, 2018.

Woo-dam, Jin-young and Yoo-jun released the digital single "You're So Beautiful" on December 2.

== Members ==
Debuted member

- Woo Jin-young (우진영)
- Park Woo-dam (박우담)
- Jung Yoo-jun (정유준)
- Kim Hyun-soo (김현수)
- Jo Yong-geun (조용근)

Former member

- Jeong Won-cheol (정원철)
- Park Hyung-jin (박형진)
- Lee Jong-min (이종민)
- Jo Yoon-cheol (조윤철)
- Yoon Jae-hee (윤재의)
- Won Hyun-sik (원현식)
- Kim Jun-hyeong (김준형)
- Kim Jung-woo (김정우)
- Kosuke (코스케)

== Discography ==
=== Extended plays ===
Title	Album details	Peak chart positions	Sales
Title	Album details	KOR	Sales
Present (as Woo Jin-young X Kim Hyun-soo)	Released: June 14, 2018; Label: Happy Face Entertainment; Formats: CD, digital download	15	KOR: 2,525

=== Singles ===
Title	Year	Peak chart positions	Album
Title	Year	KOR	Album
"I'm Your Light" (빛이 될게)	2017	—	Non-album single
"Falling In Love" (설레고 난리)	2018	—	Present
"You Are So Beautiful" (너 참 예쁘다)	2018	—	Non-album single
"—" denotes releases that did not chart.
