= Very Berry =

Very Berry may refer to:

- Very Berry, Starburst (candy)
- Very Berry, Airborne (dietary supplement)
- Very Berry (EP), 2016 mini-album by South Korean girl group Berry Good
- Very Berry Production Rina Koike
- Very Berry, startup by Nikhil Kartha
