= D1ce =

South Korean boy group

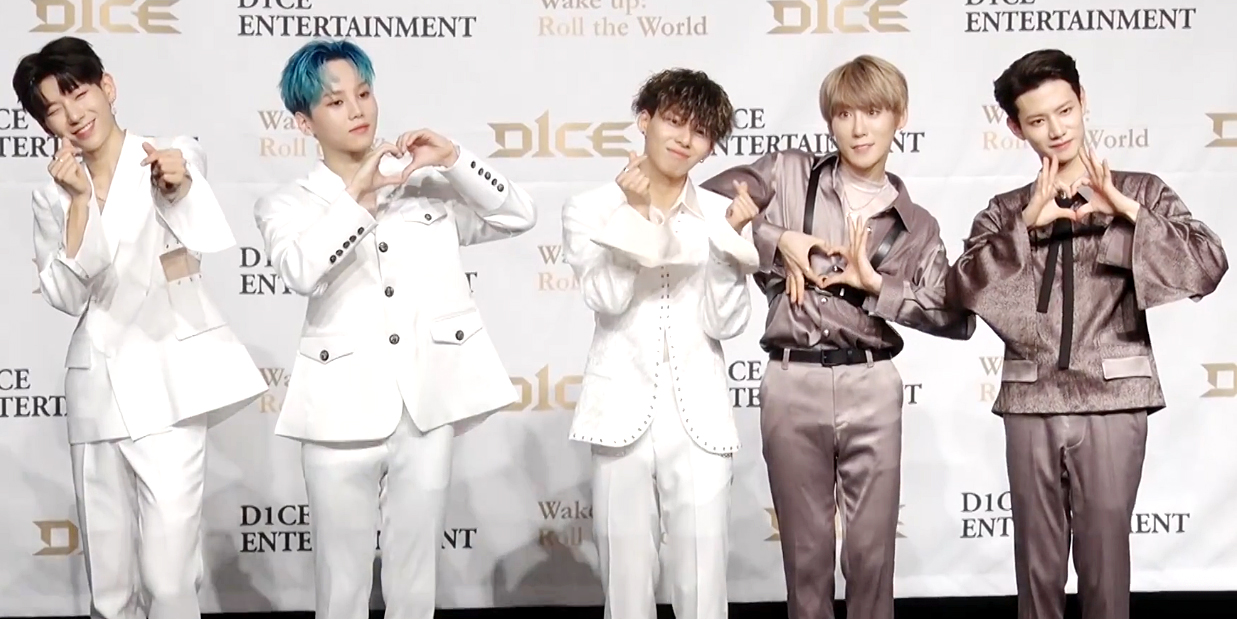
- D1ce at its Wake Up: Roll the World showcase, August 2019

Background information
- Origin: Seoul, South Korea
- Genre: K-pop
- Years active: 2019–2023
- Label: Dreamcatcher Company
- Past members: Jo Yong-geun; Kim Hyun-soo; Jung Yoo-jun; Park Woo-dam; Woo Jin-young

D1ce (Korean: 디원스, stylized in all caps; pronounced as "The Once") was a South Korean boy band formed by Dreamcatcher Company. The group consisted of five members: Jo Yong-geun, Kim Hyun-soo, Jung Yoo-jun, Park Woo-dam, and Woo Jin-young. They debuted on August 1, 2019 with the EP Wake Up: Roll the World. The group disbanded on January 20, 2023 following their contract expiration.

== History ==
=== Pre-debut ===
Jung Yoo-jun was a contestant in the Mnet survival series Boys24 in 2016, becoming a member of the survival pre-debut team Unit Blue.

Park Woo-dam, Woo Jin-young, Jo Yong-geun participated in the Mnet survival series Produce 101 Season 2 in 2017 under Happy Face sub-label HF Music Company. Woo-dam, Jin-young and Yong-geun placed 35th, 40th and 93rd respectively.

Park Woo-dam, Woo Jin-young, Jo Yong-geun, Kim Hyun-soo and other Happy Face trainees participated in the JTBC survival series Mix Nine in September 2017. Jin-young placed 1st, becoming a member of the winning group, however the group's debut was cancelled after unsuccessful contract negotiation between the show's agency and the winning contestants respective agencies. Hyun-soo and Yong-geun placed 14th, 25th respectively.

All the members was previously introduced as a pre-debut team HNB (HappyFace Next Boys) and had released several songs as unit or duo since 2017.

In March 2019, Happy Face Entertainment confirmed the five members to debut in the group and set up their own-group label. The name of the group was voted by fans, D1ce was the winning suggestion.

On April 29, 2019, D1ce Entertainment confirmed Jin-young will be participating in Mnet rap competition series Show Me The Money 8 and then confirmed that D1ce plan to debut in the summer.

=== 2019: Debut with Wake Up: Roll the World ===
The group's debut EP Wake Up: Roll the World was released on August 1, with "Wake Up" serving as its lead single. A debut showcase was held in the conjunction of the album's release at the SAC Art Hall.

=== 2020–2023: Draw You: Remember Me, new digital singles and disbandment ===
The group released their second extended play Draw You: Remember Me on June 17, 2020, with "Draw You" serving as its lead single.

On August 18, 2020, they released a collaboration single with Clef Crew titled "One Summer".

On November 30, 2020, they released the digital single "Good Day".

On February 10, 2021, they released a new digital single "You're My Destiny".

On May 6, 2021, Jo Yong-geun enlisted for his mandatory military service.

On June 9, 2021, Woo Jin-young made his solo debut with his first extended play [3-2=A].

On September 27, 2021, Park Woo-dam enlisted for his mandatory military service.

On March 18, 2022, members Kim Hyun-soo and Jung Yu-jun made the announcement through their official fan cafe that they will enlist in the military on March 21, 2022.

On January 20, 2023, D1ce Entertainment announced that D1ce had disbanded following their contract expiration.

== Discography ==
=== Extended plays ===
Title	Album details	Peak chart positions	Sales
Title	Album details	KOR	Sales
Wake Up: Roll the World	Released: August 1, 2019; Label: D1CE Entertainment; Formats: CD, digital download; track listing: 1. Intro: Roll the World; 2. Wake Up; 3. Dot; 4. Amazing; 5. Hands Up; 6. U R	9	KOR: 6,372
Draw You: Remember Me	Released: June 17, 2020; Label: D1CE Entertainment; Formats: CD, digital download; track listing: 1. Intro; 2. Draw You; 3. Remember; 4. Another One; 5. Be The Light (Acoustic ver.); 6. Draw You (Inst.)	48	KOR: 3,480

=== Singles ===
Title	Year	Album
As lead artist
"Wake Up" (깨워)	2019	Wake Up: Roll the World
"Draw You" (너를 그린다)	2020	Draw You: Remember Me
"Good Day"	2020	Non-album singles
"You're My Destiny"	2021	Non-album singles
Promotional singles
"I'll Stay with You"	2020	Once Again OST Part. 6
"One Summer"	2020	Clef Crew Project. Take Two
"My Heart is All a Flutter"	2021	Mad for Each Other OST Part. 4
