= Her Secret Weapon =

- Left to right: Daeun, Dahye, Minhee, Yerin, Jisoo, Alice, Sihyun, Solbin, Jei, and Daye
- Also known as: The Secret Weapon; The Secret Weapon, Her
- Created by: MBC Every 1
- Presented by: Defconn; Jang Su-won; Boom
- Country of origin: South Korea
- Original language: Korean
- No. of series: 1
- No. of episodes: 12

Original release
- Network: MBC Every 1
- Release: June 19 – August 28, 2015

Her Secret Weapon (Korean: 비밀병기그녀, also called The Secret Weapon and The Secret Weapon, Her) is a 2015 South Korean reality show that focuses on members of lesser-known K-pop girl groups. The show explores what it is that turns people into fans of a certain girl group or individual idol by exposing the charms or "secret weapons" of each contestant. As ten contestants show off their hidden talents and charms through competition, their rankings in various missions are decided by a panel of ten judges who were reporters, industry experts, and passionate girl group fans. The show premiered on June 19, 2015, on MBC Every 1.

== History ==
Beginning June 5, 2015, MBC Plus Media began teasing members of the show's cast, releasing a new member's identity every few days and eventually releasing a video trailer for the show as a whole. On June 17, 2015, a poster of all ten contestants was released on social media.

The show is hosted by Defconn, Jang Su-won, and Boom and features Yerin (GFriend), Dahye (BESTie), Alice (Hello Venus), Solbin (LABOUM), Sihyun (SPICA), Daye (Berry Good), Jisoo (TAHITI), Minhee (STELLAR), Jei (Fiestar), and Daeun (2EYES).

In the fifth episode, Yerin, Minhee, Jei, and Daye were eliminated. They were then given the choice to stay or leave the show. Yerin and Minhee chose to stay, while Jei and Daye chose to be replaced by a group mate. In the sixth episode, Taeha became the Berry Good representative and Cao Lu became the Fiestar representative.

== Episodes ==
Episode 1
Aired: June 19, 2015
Role Model: Suzy (of miss A)

Episode 2
Aired: June 26, 2015
Role Model: Hyuna (of 4Minute)

Episode 3
Aired: July 3, 2015
Role Model: IU

Episode 4
Aired: July 10, 2015
Role Model: CL (of 2NE1)

Episode 5
Aired: July 17, 2015
Role Model: CL (of 2NE1) (Cont.)

Episode 6
Aired: July 24, 2015
Role Model: Soyou (of Sistar)

Episode 7
Aired: July 31, 2015
Role Model: Soyou of Sistar (cont.)

Episode 8
Aired: August 7, 2015
Role Model: Hyeri (of Girl's Day)

Episode 9
Aired: August 14, 2015
Role Model: Hyeri (of Girl's Day) (cont.)

Episode 10
Aired: August 21, 2015
Role Model: Hyeri (of Girl's Day) (cont.)

Episode 11
Aired: August 28, 2015
Role Model: Goo Hara (of KARA)

Episode 12
Aired: September 4, 2015
Role Model: Goo Hara (of KARA) (cont.)

== Contestant rankings ==
Order	Episode											
Order	1	2	3	4	5*	Mid-term Results**	6	7	8–10***	11	12****	Final Results§
1	Sihyun	Dahye	Yerin	Alice	Jisoo	Dahye	Dahye	Dahye	Daeun	Solbin	Minhee	Dahye
2	Daeun	Daeun	Daeun	Dahye	Solbin	Daeun	Caolu	Caolu	Dahye	Minhee	—	Daeun
3	Daye	Minhee	Dahye	Jei	Alice	Alice	Taeha	Sihyun	Caolu	Yerin	—	Jisoo
4	Dahye	Alice	Daye	Daeun	Dahye	Jisoo	Jisoo	Daeun	Jisoo	Caolu	—	Caolu
5	Jisoo	Jisoo	Sihyun	Sihyun	Jei	Solbin	Sihyun	Taeha	Minhee	Jisoo	—	Sihyun
6	Solbin	Jei	Solbin	Solbin	Daye	Sihyun	Daeun	Alice	Sihyun	Sihyun	—	Solbin
7	Alice	Sihyun	Alice	Jisoo	Minhee	Yerin	Solbin	Jisoo	Solbin	Daeun	—	Taeha
8	Yerin	Solbin	Minhee	Daye	Sihyun	Minhee	Minhee	Solbin	Taeha	Alice	—	Minhee
9	Jei	Yerin	Jisoo	Minhee	Daeun	Daye	Alice	Minhee	Alice	Dahye	—	Alice
10	Minhee	Daye	Jei	Yerin	Yerin	Jei	Yerin	Yerin	Yerin	Taeha	—	Yerin
* combined scores of episode 4 and 5 events ** Combined scores of episodes 1–5. Originally, the bottom five were to be eliminated. After the tie for 5th place, this became the bottom four. *** Combined scores of episodes 8–10. **** The 2-10 rankings for this episodes were not announced. § Final overall placing for the show; the 1st place contestant in this lineup is the show's ultimate winner.

These contestants tied for second place.
These contestants tied for third place.
These contestants tied for fifth place.
These contestants tied for sixth place.
These contestants tied for seventh place.
These contestants tied for eighth place.
These contestants were eliminated, but chose to continue with the show.
These contestants were eliminated from competition and replaced with their group mates.
This contestant replaced their group mate after they were eliminated.
This contestant was absentee for ranking.
