= Mix Nine =

Reality survival show

- Promotional poster
- Genre: Reality competition
- Created by: JTBC Variety Production; YG Entertainment
- Directed by: Han Dong-chul
- Presented by: Noh Hong-chul
- Judges: Yang Hyun-suk
- Opening theme: "Just Dance" (prod. by Teddy) by Mix Nine contestants
- Country of origin: South Korea
- Original language: Korean
- No. of episodes: 14 (list of episodes)

Production
- Executive producers: Bang Jin-ho; Han Dong-chul
- Running time: 89-123 minutes; 270 minutes (finale)
- Production companies: YG Entertainment; Golden Eight Media

Original release
- Network: JTBC
- Release: October 29, 2017 – January 26, 2018

Mix Nine (Korean: 믹스나인) is a South Korean reality competition show broadcast on JTBC. In the show, YG Entertainment founder and producer Yang Hyun-suk traveled to music agencies across Korea to find up-and-coming K-pop stars. Throughout the episodes, contestants were progressively eliminated, culminating in a competition between a team of the final nine boys and one of the final nine girls. The winning team was to debut as idols, but their debut was ultimately cancelled following contract disputes between YG Entertainment and the contestants' respective agencies.

The season finale was broadcast live on January 26, 2018 at 11pm.

== Concept ==
Mix Nine was a collaboration project between director Han Dong-chul, producer Yang Hyun-suk, and JTBC. Han Dong-chul, who was the executive producer of the first two seasons of Mnet's Produce 101 originally came with the concept for the show's third season. The show had 400 auditions from more than 70 agencies which Yang and the guest judges personally visited. Contestants included both trainees and lesser known K-pop idols looking to seek further attention. According to Yang, good looks and have pleasing personalities are some of his preference in choosing the trainees, although not a requirement. 170 trainees were chosen by Yang Hyun-suk and guest judges CL, Zion.T, Seungri, and Taeyang.

After the agency tour concluded, the trainees were divided into four classes (Debut team, A, B, and C) to train and compete in ranking missions that were judged by a combination of judge evaluations and viewer voting.

For the participants' training, several artists were recruited for the show. Vocal trainer and singer Ha Dong-kyun and singer Suran were in charge of the vocal training. In addition, rapper Swings was their rap mentor, while YG Entertainment dancers Kwon Young-deuk and Kwon Young-don were responsible for training. With nine members each, the remaining male team would go against the remaining female team. The final group would promote for seven months.

== Pre-show and promotions ==
On September 18, a 2-minute video teaser was uploaded via YG Entertainment's YouTube in which Yang briefly described the show concept. Through his Instagram account, Yang also constantly updated which companies he already visited and how many trainees had passed so far. At the same time, the show also released photos of trainees who had undergone the audition, which included members from KNK, 24K, ONF, Loona, A.C.E and JJCC.

On September 14, JTBC announced an upcoming press conference on the 19th. On that day, the show's producers Han Dong-chul and Yoo Sung Mo attended a press conference held at the JTBC building, and the confirmation of the show's premiere was announced to be on October 29. On September 25, Noh Hong-cheol was announced to be the host of the show. About a month after, JTBC released a representative image of the show on October 11 with the caption 'Save a Shining Boy and Girl' and the logo 9. On the same day, another video teaser, in which singer Zion.T was announced as one of the judges of the show, was released.

The day before the premiere of the show, the show's production presentation was held at a hotel near Hakdong Station. Yang Hyun-suk and Han Dong-cheol, together with Seungri and Zion.T attended the presentation. On the same day, the participants singing and dancing to its theme song was released. On November 19 two different versions of the song and music videos were released. Three different versions of the song were released overall: Boys' version led by Hyojin of ONF, girls' version led by Lee Sujin from Fave Entertainment (now in Weeekly) and a co-ed version performed by both teams. Produced by Teddy, "Just Dance" was reported to be his first song produced for a non-YG Entertainment artist.

== Contestants ==
=== Male contestants ===
Color key

New Top 9

#	Episode 4	Episode 5	Episode 7		Episode 8	Episode 10		Episode 11	Episode 13		Episode 14
#	Episode 4	Episode 5	Name	Votes	Episode 8	Name	Votes	Episode 11	Name	Votes	Episode 14
1	Woo Jin-young	Woo Jin-young	Woo Jin-young	154,389	Woo Jin-young	Woo Jin-young	86,026	Woo Jin-young	Kim Hyo-jin (▲1)	103,822	Woo Jin-young (▲1)
2	Kim Hyo-jin	Kim Hyo-jin	Kim Hyo-jin	112,984	Kim Hyo-jin	Kim Byeong-kwan (▲1)	66,199	Kim Hyo-jin (▲1)	Woo Jin-young (▼1)	94,495	Kim Hyo-jin (▼1)
3	Lee Geon-min	Kim Byeong-kwan (▲3)	Kim Byeong-kwan	92,381	Kim Byeong-kwan	Kim Hyo-jin (▼1)	63,086	Kim Byeong-kwan (▼1)	Kim Byeong-kwan	—N/a	Lee Roo-bin (▲9)
4	Lee Seung-jun	Lee Seung-jun	Lee Seung-jun	—N/a	Kim Min-seok (▲1)	Kim Min-seok	45,956	Lee Dong-hoon (▲1)	Kim Min-seok (▲3)	—N/a	Kim Byeong-kwan (▼1)
5	Kim Min-seok	Lee Geon-min (▼2)	Kim Min-seok (▲1)	72,728	Kim Hyeon-soo (▲18)	Lee Dong-hun (▲1)	43,949	Song Han-kyeom (▲2)	Choi Hyun-suk (▲1)	—N/a	Choi Hyun-suk
6	Kim Byeong-kwan	Kim Min-seok (▼1)	Lee Geon-min (▼1)	72,704	Lee Dong-hun (▲9)	Lee Seung-jun (▲1)	43,778	Choi Hyun-suk (▲3)	Lee Dong-hoon (▼2)	—N/a	Song Han-kyeom (▲1)
7	Shim Jae-young	Woo Tae-woon (▲6)	Woo Tae-woon	63,907	Lee Seung-jun (▼3)	Song Han-kyeom (▲3)	42,373	Kim Min-seok (▼3)	Song Han-kyeom (▼2)	—N/a	Kim Min-seok (▼3)
8	Park Min-gyun	Shim Jae-young (▼1)	Choi Hyun-suk (▲7)	57,777	Lee Geon-min (▼2)	Kim Hyeon-soo (▼3)	39,934	Yao Ming-ming (▲5)	Lee Byeong-gon (▲5)	—N/a	Lee Dong-hoon (▼2)
9	Yuto Mizuguchi	Park Min-gyun (▼1)	Song Han-kyeom (▲5)	57,629	Lee Roo-bin (▲7)	Choi Hyun-suk (▲3)	39,406	Lee Roo-bin (▲3)	Yao Ming-ming (▼1)	—N/a	Lee Byeong-gon (▼1)

=== Female contestants ===
Color key

New Top 9

#	Episode 4	Episode 5	Episode 7		Episode 8	Episode 10		Episode 11	Episode 13		Episode 14
#	Episode 4	Episode 5	Name	Votes	Episode 8	Name	Votes	Episode 11	Name	Votes	Episode 14
1	Shin Ryu-jin	Shin Ryu-jin	Shin Ryu-jin	141,230	Shin Ryu-jin	Shin Ryu-jin	90,758	Shin Ryu-jin	Shin Ryu-jin	—N/a	Shin Ryu-jin
2	Lee Soo-min	Lee Soo-min	Lee Soo-min	91,636	Lee Soo-min	Lee Soo-min	—N/a	Lee Soo-min	Lee Soo-min	—N/a	Lee Soo-min
3	Kim So-ri	Kim So-ri	Kim So-ri	67,896	Jeon Hee-jin (▲2)	Lee Soo-jin (▲3)	44,807	Jang Hyo-kyung (▲9)	Kim Hyun-jin (▲9)	—N/a	Park Soo-min (▲6)
4	Kim Min-ji	Choi Moon-hee (▲4)	Choi Moon-hee	61,931	Kim So-ri (▼1)	Choi Moon-hee (▲1)	40,345	Lee Soo-jin (▼1)	Jang Hyo-kyung (▼1)	—N/a	Jeon Hee-jin (▲2)
5	Baek Hyeon-joo	Jeon Hee-jin (▲2)	Jeon Hee-jin	60,724	Choi Moon-hee (▼1)	Jeon Hee-jin (▼2)	37,608	Lee Ha-young (▲2)	Jung Ha-yoon (▲9)	—N/a	Nam Yu-jin (▲2)
6	Kim Hyun-jin	Baek Hyeon-joo (▼1)	Baek Hyeon-joo	58,573	Lee Soo-jin (▲2)	Kim So-ri (▼2)	35,536	Nam Yu-jin (▲4)	Jeon Hee-jin (▲1)	—N/a	Choi Moon-hee (▲5)
7	Jeon Hee-jin	Kim Min-ji (▼3)	Kim Hyun-jin (▲1)	55,313	Baek Hyeon-joo (▼1)	Lee Ha-young (▲2)	34,593	Jeon Hee-jin (▼2)	Nam Yu-jin (▼1)	—N/a	Kim So-ri (▲3)
8	Choi Moon-hee	Kim Hyun-jin (▼2)	Lee Soo-jin (▲1)	50,666	Kim Hyun-jin (▼1)	Kim Hyun-jin	34,524	Choi Moon-hee (▼4)	Lee Ha-young (▼3)	—N/a	Jang Hyo-kyung (▼4)
9	Lee Hyang-suk	Lee Soo-jin (▲4)	Lee Hyang-suk (▲1)	38,005	Lee Ha-young (▲16)	Baek Hyeon-joo (▼2)	33,869	Park Soo-min (▲6)	Park Soo-min	—N/a	Lee Ha-young (▼1)

=== Elimination chart ===
The first elimination round starts at Episode 7; second round at Episode 10; third round at Episode 13; and the final elimination round at Episode 14, wherein the Debut Team was announced.

Color key

Top 9 of the week
Eliminated
Left the show

Male participants

Contestant	Company	Ranking									
Contestant	Company	Showcase	Ep.4	Ep.5	Ep.7		Ep.8	Ep.10	Ep.11	Ep.13	Ep.14 (final)
Contestant	Company	Grade	#	#	# (Note: Male and female rankings are combined.)	# (Note: Male ranking only)	#	#	#	#	#
Woo Jin-young (우진영)	Happy Face Entertainment	B	1	1	1	1	1	1	1	2	1
Kim Hyo-jin (김효진)	WM Entertainment	9	2	2	3	2	2	3	2	1	2
Lee Ru-bin (이루빈)	Liveworks Company	A	14	17	24	16	9	12	9	12	3
Kim Byeong-kwan (김병관)	Beat Interactive	9	6	3	4	3	3	2	3	3	4
Choi Hyun-suk (최현석)	YG Entertainment	9	17	15	14	8	12	9	6	5	5
Song Han-gyeom (송한겸)	Staro Entertainment	9	16	14	15	9	10	7	5	7	6
Kim Min-seok (김민석)	WM Entertainment	A	5	6	7	5	4	4	7	4	7
Lee Dong-hun (이동훈)	Beat Interactive	9	18	16	23	15	6	5	4	6	8
Lee Byeong-gon (이병곤)	YG Entertainment	A	28	27	40	25	23	22	13	8	9
Yao Ming-ming (요명명)	ByKing Entertainment	B	12	11	20	13	18	13	8	9	10
Lee Seung-joon (이승준)	WM Entertainment	C	4	4	6	4	7	6	11	10	Eliminated
Kim Seh-yoon (김세윤)	Beat Interactive	C	27	24	30	20	11	10	10	11	Eliminated
Shim Jae-young (심재영)	WM Entertainment	B	7	8	16	10	16	17	15	13	Eliminated
Kim Hyeon-soo (김현수)	Happy Face Entertainment	B	19	22	34	23	5	8	12	14	Eliminated
Jin Seong-ho (진성호)	Liveworks Company	C	32	34	49	29	21	18	14	15	Eliminated
Lee Jae-jun (이재준)	Banana Culture	C	30	49	99	53	28	26	17	16	Eliminated
Kim Hyun-jong (김현종)	Hunus Entertainment	A	43	47	86	48	47	27	19	17	Eliminated
Kim Kook-heon (김국헌)	The Music Works	9	42	38	60	36	36	25	21	18	Eliminated
Lee Geon-min (이건민)	RBW	B	3	5	8	6	8	14	16	19	Eliminated
Woo Tae-woon (우태운)	Million Market	B	13	7	10	7	13	11	20	20	Eliminated
Kim Dong-yoon (김동윤)	WYNN Entertainment	B	31	31	51	30	24	24	18	21	Eliminated
Park Min-kyun (박민균)	WM Entertainment	A	8	9	21	14	15	19	24	22	Eliminated
Yuto Mizuguchi (미즈구치 유토)	WM Entertainment	A	9	10	18	11	14	16	23	23	Eliminated
Oh Hee-jun (오희준)	YNB Entertainment	B	24	29	54	32	37	23	25	24	Eliminated
Cho Yong-geun (조용근)	Happy Face Entertainment	C	10	13	25	17	19	15	22	25	Eliminated
Jung In-seong (정인성)	YNB Entertainment	A	23	28	43	27	26	20	26	26	Eliminated
Kim Young-jo (김영조)	RBW	C	21	23	41	26	29	21	27	27	Eliminated
Lee Chan-dong (이찬동)	RBW	A	33	33	58	34	41	28	Eliminated		
Lee Chang-yoon (이창윤)	WM Entertainment	A	11	12	19	12	17	29	Eliminated		
Yoon Jae-hee (윤재희)	Happy Face Entertainment	B	20	20	37	24	20	30	Eliminated		
Kim Sang-won (김상원)	Staro Entertainment	B	25	25	31	21	30	31	Eliminated		
Park Seung-jun (박승준)	YNB Entertainment	C	15	18	28	19	22	32	Eliminated		
Jung Hyeon-woo (정현우)	FM Entertainment	A	29	30	59	35	31	33	Eliminated		
Chae Chang-hyeon (채창현)	Banana Culture	A	34	36	62	37	35	34	Eliminated		
Kim Jun-kyu (김준규)	YG Entertainment	B	37	32	53	31	34	35	Eliminated		
Shin Jun-seop (신준섭)	The Music Works	B	26	21	32	22	25	36	Eliminated		
Park Hyeon-gyu (박현규)	RBW	B	38	35	55	33	32	37	Eliminated		
Baek Jin (백진)	Start Entertainment	B	52	45	71	40	38	38	Eliminated		
Lee Ha-bit (이하빛)	NH Media	A	55	52	76	43	27	39	Eliminated		
Im Young-jun (임영준)	Eleven 9 Entertainment	B	49	51	80	45	45	40	Eliminated		
Kim Min-hak (김민학)	Hunus Entertainment	9	36	37	63	38	40	41	Eliminated		
Kim Hong-joong (김홍중)	KQ Entertainment	9	59	59	87	49	44	42	Eliminated		
Choi Jong-ho (최종호)	KQ Entertainment	A	57	61	91	50	46	43	Eliminated		
Ma Jae-kyeong (마재경)	Hunus Entertainment	B	45	46	92	51	43	44	Eliminated		
Park Seong-hyeon (박성현)	Chrome Entertainment	C	51	48	77	44	50	45	Eliminated		
Lee Jae-joon (이재준)	RBW	B	35	19	27	18	33	46	Eliminated		
Kazuhiro Hiyama (히아마 가즈히로)	Major 9	A	47	43	74	41	52	47	Eliminated		
Kim Jun-hoe (김준회)	Jungle Entertainment	C	62	66	98	52	51	48	Eliminated		
Hwang Yoon-seong (황윤성)	Hunus Entertainment	B	41	42	84	47	48	49	Eliminated		
Moon Jae-yoon (문재윤)	Liveworks Company	A	40	39	82	46	39	50	Eliminated		
Yoon Yong-bin (윤용빈)	Banana Entertainment	C	22	26	47	28	42	51	Eliminated		
Jo Young-ho (조영호)	Maroo Entertainment	9	46	44	75	42	49	52	Eliminated		
Kim Jin-hong (김진홍)	Choeun Entertainment	B	39	41	70	39	Left				
Kim Sang-jin (김상진)	The Music Works	A	54	55	100	54	Eliminated				
Kim Seung-min (김승민)	Mystic Entertainment	C	61	58	101	55	Eliminated				
Kim Dong-hyeon (김동현)	NH Media	A	48	50	102	56	Eliminated				
Shin Jung-min (신중민)	FM Entertainment	C	50	53	103	57	Eliminated				
Kim Sang-yeon (김상연)	FM Entertainment	C	44	40	104	58	Eliminated				
Lee Chang-seon (이창선)	Choeun Entertainment	A	56	56	105	59	Eliminated				
Han Jong-yeon (한종연)	Maroo Entertainment	A	53	54	106	60	Eliminated				
Kim Jae-oh (김재오)	Chrome Entertainment	C	68	67	108	61	Eliminated				
Moon Young-seo (문영서)	Luce Entertainment	C	66	65	111	62	Eliminated				
Song Min-gi (송민기)	KQ Entertainment	A	67	72	113	63	Eliminated				
Manny (만니)	Jungle Entertainment	B	65	57	115	64	Eliminated				
Kim Young-jin (김영진)	Jackie Chan Group Korea	C	60	60	118	65	Eliminated				
Kim Seong-yeon (김성연)	IME Korea	C	70	64	119	66	Eliminated				
Jo Han-guk (조한국)	NH Media	C	64	62	120	67	Eliminated				
Son Jun-hyeong (손준형)	Maroo Entertainment	A	69	68	122	68	Eliminated				
Kim Han-kyeol (김한결)	IME Korea	B	58	63	127	69	Eliminated				
Jung Seong-cheol (정성철)	Urbane Music	C	71	69	128	70	Eliminated				
Jung Seung-bo (정승보)	Jungle Entertainment	C	72	70	131	71	Eliminated				
Jung Woo-young (정우영)	KQ Entertainment	C	63	71	132	72	Eliminated				

Female participants

Contestant	Company	Ranking									
Contestant	Company	Showcase	Ep.4	Ep.5	Ep.7		Ep.8	Ep.10	Ep.11	Ep.13	Ep.14 (final)
Contestant	Company	Grade	#	#	#	# (Note: Female ranking only)	#	#	#	#	#
Shin Ryu-jin (신류진)	JYP Entertainment	A	1	1	2	1	1	1	1	1	1
Lee Soo-min (이수민)	Fave Entertainment	A	2	2	5	2	2	2	2	2	2
Park Su-min (박수민)	IME Korea	9	58	55	93	41	18	15	9	9	3
Jeon Hee-jin (전희진)	Blockberry Creative	B	7	5	12	5	3	5	7	6	4
Nam Yu-jin (남유진)	Bace Camp Studio	C	20	18	39	15	10	10	6	7	5
Choi Moon-hee (최문희)	Maroo Entertainment	A	8	4	11	4	5	4	8	11	6
Kim So-ri (김소리)	Mole Entertainment	A	3	3	9	3	4	6	10	10	7
Jang Hyo-kyeong (장효경)	Star Empire Entertainment	B	29	33	65	27	19	12	3	4	8
Lee Ha-young (이하영)	Coridel Entertainment	C	36	34	61	25	9	7	5	8	9
Kim Bo-won (김보원)	Fave Entertainment	B	28	31	64	26	20	16	11	15	10
Kim Hyun-jin (김현진)	Blockberry Creative	A	6	8	17	7	8	8	12	3	Eliminated
Jung Ha-yoon (정하윤)	Maroo Entertainment	9	47	30	44	17	16	11	14	5	Eliminated
Jung Sa-ra (정사라)	Bace Camp Studio	A	16	23	48	20	33	17	18	12	Eliminated
Baek Hyeon-joo (백현주)	Yama & Hotchicks	A	5	6	13	6	7	9	13	13	Eliminated
Hwang Ji-min (황지민)	Mystic Entertainment	A	34	37	90	39	41	26	25	14	Eliminated
Kim Min-kyung (김민경)	Mostable Music	A	46	47	69	31	22	20	15	16	Eliminated
Kim Su-hyeon (김수현)	Mystic Entertainment	C	22	22	45	18	27	25	17	17	Eliminated
Choi Yun-a (최윤아)	Hunus Entertainment	C	32	36	79	35	25	23	23	18	Eliminated
Kim Si-hyeon (김시현)	The Music Works	9	49	44	90	40	34	18	20	19	Eliminated
Heo Chan-mi (허찬미)	Mostable Music	A	10	11	29	10	13	14	16	20	Eliminated
Go A-ra (고아라)	Astory Entertainment	B	19	17	38	14	14	19	19	21	Eliminated
Kim Soo-a (김수아)	A100 Entertainment	C	37	38	85	37	12	13	21	22	Eliminated
Lee Ji-eun (이지은)	The Music Works	B	81	77	83	36	15	24	22	23	Eliminated
Shin Ji-won (신지원)	JTG Entertainment	C	33	25	56	23	28	27	26	24	Eliminated
Rui Watanabe (와타나베 루이)	New Planet Entertainment	C	25	27	57	24	21	21	24	25	Eliminated
Kim Min-joo (김민주)	Astory Entertainment	A	31	35	68	30	44	22	27	26	Eliminated
Lee Soo-jin (이수진)	Fave Entertainment	9	13	9	22	8	6	3	4	Left	
Kim Yoon-young (김윤영)	—N/a	B	44	45	97	45	38	28	Eliminated		
Kang Si-hyeon (강시현)	Star Empire Entertainment	A	18	20	52	22	36	29	Eliminated		
Park Hae-young (박해영)	2able Company	B	21	21	46	19	26	30	Eliminated		
Lee Hyang-suk (이향숙)	SidusHQ	B	9	10	26	9	11	31	Eliminated		
Ng Sze Kai (응 씨 카이)	Unleash Entertainment	C	11	12	33	11	24	32	Eliminated		
Lee Yong-chae (이용채)	ONO Entertainment	A	88	67	96	44	45	33	Eliminated		
Yukika Teramoto (테라모토 유키카)	Mole Entertainment	C	17	14	36	13	17	34	Eliminated		
Park Hae-rin (박해린)	Fave Entertainment	A	15	15	35	12	23	35	Eliminated		
Kim Yoon-ji (김윤지)	Star Empire Entertainment	A	42	40	81	36	40	36	Eliminated		
Kim Hyeon-jeong (김현정)	JTG Entertainment	C	41	43	78	34	32	37	Eliminated		
Go Jeong-hee (고정희)	Astory Entertainment	C	26	29	67	29	42	38	Eliminated		
Choi Ha-young(최하영)	Home Entertainment	9	35	26	50	21	29	39	Eliminated		
Kim Young-seo (김영서)	RBW	9	39	42	94	42	46	40	Eliminated		
Im So-hyeon (임소현)	Major 9	B	62	61	95	43	30	41	Eliminated		
Yoo Jin-kyeong (유진경)	Brave Entertainment	9	24	19	42	16	35	42	Eliminated		
Yang Hye-seon (양혜선)	Hunus Entertainment	A	38	39	72	32	37	43	Eliminated		
Shin Ji-yoon (신지윤)	Fave Entertainment	A	40	41	88	38	31	44	Eliminated		
Kim Da-yoon (김다윤)	Maroo Entertainment	A	27	28	66	28	39	45	Eliminated		
Im Jeong-min (임정민)	ONO Entertainment	A	30	32	73	33	43	46	Eliminated		
Kim Min-ji (김민지)	Happy Face Entertainment	B	4	7	Left						
Kim Yoo-hyeon (김유현)	Happy Face Entertainment	9	12	13	Left						
Lee Si-yeon (이시연)	Happy Face Entertainment	B	14	16	Left						
Lee Yu-bin (이유빈)	Happy Face Entertainment	B	23	24	Left						
Heo Young-joo (허영주)	Mole Entertainment	B	50	50	107	51	Eliminated				
Mizuki Ogawa (오가와 미즈키)	—N/a	C	48	49	109	52	Eliminated				
Kwak Hi-o (곽히오)	Jungle Entertainment	C	45	46	110	53	Eliminated				
Lee Ye-eun (이예은)	Mole Entertainment	C	52	52	112	54	Eliminated				
Park So-eun (박소은)	Fave Entertainment	A	43	48	114	55	Eliminated				
Park Ji-woo (박지우)	Start Entertainment	A	61	57	116	56	Eliminated				
Moon Seung-you (문승유)	Start Entertainment	C	54	51	117	57	Eliminated				
Kim Seong-eun (김성은)	RBW	C	64	63	121	58	Eliminated				
Shin Su-hyun (신수현)	Fave Entertainment	C	53	54	123	59	Eliminated				
Hwang Woo-rim (황우림)	Coridel Entertainment	B	51	53	124	60	Eliminated				
Baek Da-ae (백다애)	Mostable Music	A	69	64	125	61	Eliminated				
Moon Eun-jin (문은진)	Illusion Entertainment	B	55	63	126	62	Eliminated				
Park Ga-eun (박가은)	The Entertainment Pascal	B	75	81	129	63	Eliminated				
Baek Min-seo (백민서)	Fave Entertainment	B	60	58	130	64	Eliminated				
Jung Ye-eun (정예은)	Yama & Hotchicks	B	65	66	133	65	Eliminated				
Lee Soo-hyeon (이수현)	Major 9	B	91	92	133	66	Eliminated				
Kim Chae-hyeon (김채현)	Maroo Entertainment	B	57	56	135	67	Eliminated				
Kim Joo-yeon (김주연)	IME Korea	A	79	89	136	68	Eliminated				
Han Byeol (한별)	Yama & Hotchicks	C	68	69	137	69	Eliminated				
Lee Yeo-reum (이여름)	Roots Entertainment	A	84	73	138	70	Eliminated				
Seo Yu-ri (서유리)	JTG Entertainment	A	76	78	139	71	Eliminated				
Bang Ye-sol (방예솔)	ONO Entertainment	B	85	83	140	72	Eliminated				
Rena Sekioka (세키오카 레나)	Star Road Entertainment	C	77	76	141	73	Eliminated				
Yoo Ha-jeong (유하정)	Polaris Entertainment	B	97	95	142	74	Eliminated				
Jung Yoo-jeong (정유정)	Alpha Entertainment	C	59	59	143	75	Eliminated				
Ahn Da-bi (안다비)	Maroo Entertainment	B	86	79	144	76	Eliminated				
Choi Ji-seon (최지선)	DK Entertainment	A	93	96	145	77	Eliminated				
Jang Eun-seong (장은성)	RBW	B	73	80	146	78	Eliminated				
Lee Bom (이봄)	Roots Entertainment	B	83	85	147	79	Eliminated				
Hong Joo-hyeon (홍주현)	Choon Entertainment	C	56	60	148	80	Eliminated				
Park Eun-jo (박은조)	IME Korea	C	96	94	149	81	Eliminated				
Lee Ye-sol (이예솔)	RBW	B	72	72	150	82	Eliminated				
Kim Hee-soo (김희수)	Eleven 9 Entertainment	9	90	97	151	83	Eliminated				
Ahn Han-byeol (안한별)	IME Korea	B	70	86	152	84	Eliminated				
Jo Yu-ri (조유리)	RBW	A	66	65	153	85	Eliminated				
Baek Hye-jin (백혜진)	Jungle Entertainment	B	74	68	154	86	Eliminated				
Han Gyeo-ul (한겨울)	ProBeat Company	C	71	70	155	87	Eliminated				
Jeon Ye-im (전예임)	A100 Entertainment	A	82	75	156	88	Eliminated				
Yeo In-hye (여인혜)	CS Entertainment	C	63	71	157	89	Eliminated				
Seo Ji-heun (서지흔)	RBW	C	78	82	158	90	Eliminated				
Lee Seung-mi (이승미)	Major 9	C	80	84	159	91	Eliminated				
Park Cho-hyeon (박초현)	Yama & Hotchicks	C	94	93	160	92	Eliminated				
Jeon Yoo-jin (전유진)	Roots Entertainment	C	67	74	161	93	Eliminated				
Jung Da-sol (정다솔)	JD Entertainment	C	89	87	162	94	Eliminated				
Song Ji-eun (송지은)	Double V Entertainment	B	98	98	163	95	Eliminated				
Choi Su-jeong (최수정)	Mostable Music	C	92	90	164	96	Eliminated				
Kim Soo-yeon (김수연)	Tajoy Entertainment	C	87	88	165	97	Eliminated				
Im Ji-hye (임지혜)	Yama & Hotchicks	A	95	91	166	98	Eliminated				

== Episodes ==
The first half of the show is labelled 'Enter Tour Step' while the second half is 'Competition Step'.

=== Episode 1 (October 29, 2017) ===
The first episode introduces all 170 participants, some of whom described their intentions in joining the program. Noh Hong-chul was seen as the show's host. The next part introduces Yang Hyun-suk and rapper CL as the judges as they start travelling to different agencies located all over the country for the audition through Yang's car. Two buses ('Debut Bus' for the nine chosen contestants and 'Trainee Bus' for the remaining ones) are seen travelling along with the judges car. For every contestant who passes the audition, he or she would be riding the bus along with the other contestants. The trainees' auditions are simultaneously watched by the judges, their agency's CEO, and their co-trainees in the bus. At the end of the episode, the music video of "Just Dance" was shown.

=== Episode 2 (November 5, 2017) ===
The show starts with introducing a '1-Day Special Mission' for the chosen participants of the show, to be shown later on. For now, the episode continues with Yang Hyun-suk travelling to different places for auditions In this episode, singer Zion.T comes along with him to judge. Towards the end of the episode, BigBang member Seungri joins Yang in his car going to one of the biggest agencies in South Korea, JYP Entertainment.

=== Episode 3 (November 12, 2017) ===
Again, the show starts with the participants gathering in a room to do the '1-Day Special Mission'; a new set of "Debut Team" will be formed after their evaluation. Participants are given two (girls) or three (boys) dance songs for them to perform in front of judges Yang Hyun-suk and Lee Seungri. Participants who are given the pass by the judges would proceed to the singing portion and only nine people would be chosen to be included in the "Debut Team". The trainees are given a shortlist of songs. After the 20-minute video, auditions carry on with Yang Hyun-suk by himself for the first half of this episode. Then, the episode continues with finishing JYP Entertainment's audition's scene (which was held during the end of the second episode) and Park Jin-young judging YG Entertainment's trainees afterwards. The episode also features BigBang's Taeyang as a guest judge. With this, this episode concludes the auditions for the show: the judges panel toured for 15 days (240 hours); 72 entertainment agencies have visited; 403 participants auditioned; 170 participants (98 girls and 72 boys) passed the audition. It also marks the start of public voting.

=== Episode 4 (November 19, 2017) ===
The episode starts off with giving each participant his/her number according to their rankings. All contestants are divided into four levels: Top 9, A, B, and C. At that moment, the 'Mix Nine's VLive Showcase' is announced along with the show's theme song, "Just Dance", and its choreography. The participants start to train by their levels with the trainers of the show. Right after, their mentors tell them their new mission: record their song and dance individually from 9AM to 3PM for re-evaluation of their level, or they are automatically put to C-class. The next day, all participants are to perform once again for a chance to level up (or down). Nine chosen members from each level of girls' and boys' team perform the song on stage. A new set of Debut Team are formed at the end: ONF's Hyojin and Fave's Lee Sujin are chosen by Yang as the male and female centers, respectively, for their first live performance. In the performance, Blackpink's member Jennie joined as guest judge. By the end of the show, their rankings based on the judges and people's votes are revealed. In total votes, the boys team (28,650 votes) earned an additional 1000 points each for winning against the girls (25,680 votes).

=== Episode 5 (November 26, 2017) ===
Noh Hong-chul meets with the trainees to announce the next challenge after the ranking announcement. The trainees are tasked to perform live in groups based on positions they want to debut in: vocal, dance or rap. Participants of each gender will have to choose from four rap songs, six vocal songs, or eight dance songs: 18 songs in total. If the number of people exceeded in their chosen song, the team will decide whom to drop through self-evaluation. The male and female participants will go against each other based on their position and the group who earns the highest points combined (50% judges; 50% audience's votes) will receive an additional 2,000 points each. Only six groups are covered this week.

=== Episode 6 (December 3, 2017) ===
The remaining twelve teams perform their respective stages and rehearsals for the groups are shown. After the last performance, the contestants are shown their overall ranking based on their positions. The additional 2,000 points are given to nine teams (88 contestants) for receiving the combined highest points on their respective group and additional 2,000 points to Kim Byeong-kwan, Woo Jin-young, Kim Hyo-jin for males and Kim Hyun-jin, Jeong Sa-ra, Im So-hyun for females for receiving the highest points in dance, rap, and vocal position respectively.

=== Episode 7 (December 10, 2017) ===
The first elimination round takes place on this episode. Participants enter the stage by their Position Battle teams and snippets of their performance are shown. Yang announces whether each member passes or gets eliminated in the show based on the showcase, position battles, additional points and online votes. Out of 170 participants, 99 remain (46 girls; 52 boys) and 71 contestants are eliminated. The Top 9 from each gender were then announced: Woo Jin-young and Shin Ryu-jin receive 1st place, while the former ranks first in the overall rank; Lee Jaejun ranks 99th, escaping elimination.

=== Episode 8 (December 17, 2017) ===
A new mission is announced: Formation Battle. Unlike the first mission, Formation Battle is a battle between the same gender. Also, the songs, remastered by YG producers, are decided through the survey about the contestants' role models and life-song. 10 teams are formed to compete for 10 songs given. Being in the Debut team, the members are allowed to choose their preferred songs. However, a maximum of three members from the Debut team are allowed in one song. They are to choose their members afterwards. The winning team will receive an additional of 10,000 votes while 2nd to 4th placers will receive 7000, 5000, 3000 more votes, respectively. 5th place receives 0 votes. The performances of all the female teams (5 groups) are covered this week: "Tell Me Your Wish" (Girls' Generation), "I'm Your Girl" (S.E.S.), "Bad Girl Good Girl" (Miss A), "Really Really" (Winner), and "Honey" (KARA).

=== Episode 9 (December 24, 2017) ===
The episode starts off with revealing the ranks of the girls' performances. It then continues with the formation battle between the remaining 52 male contestants. The performances of all the male teams (5 groups) are as follows: "Hug" (TVXQ), "Ringa Linga" (Taeyang), "It's You" (Super Junior), "Paradise Lost" (Gain), and "Bang Bang Bang" (BigBang).

=== Episode 10 (December 31, 2017) ===
The episode starts off with revealing the ranks of the boys' performances. Then, another new mission is announced: Digital Song Battle. Both male and female teams will be given three songs - Kang Wook-jin, Diggy, and LIØN's "Hand in Hand"; FUTURE BOUNCE's "Super Freak"; MC Mong's "Stand By Me"; and "After This Night"; Ilhoon and Kamen Rider's "Hush"; and Kim Dohoon's "Dangerous Girl". Participants are judged individually and only ranks 1 to 27 from the male and female teams are able to participate however, prior to the elimination, all participants pick their chosen songs. Soon after, the second elimination round commenced. Yang announces whether each member passes or gets eliminated in the show, and then announces each Top 9. Woo Jin-young and Shin Ryu-jin rank 1st place once again; the latter ranks first in the overall rank.

=== Episode 11 (January 7, 2018) ===
Participants who survived are re-grouped (a maximum of nine members each) due to uneven distribution after the last elimination round. Male and female members from each team go against each other and the three best individuals for each team will receive 5000, 7000, and 10000 points, respectively. Individual scores are based on 20% judge votes and 80% audience votes. All three female groups are covered this week.

=== Episode 12 (January 14, 2018) ===
The episode follows the Digital Song Battle with the remaining three male groups' performances. By the end of the episode, a preview of the Debut Team going to BigBang's concert as a present by Yang Hyun-suk was shown.

=== Episode 13 (January 21, 2018) ===
The episode starts with a poll of the participants conducted before the elimination round. This includes 'Top 3 Visual': Kim Hyojin, Kim Hyun-jong, and Lee Jae-jun for boys, Lee Ha-young, Choi Moon-hee, and Jeon Hee-jin for girls; 'Hot Guy Representative' Shim Jae-young; 'Crying Queen' Shin Ji-won; 'Most Energetic Girl' Kim Su-hyun and Kim Hyun-jin; and 'Most Easily Excited Boy' Kim Guk-heon. During the elimination round; participants enter the stage by their Digital Song Battle teams. Jang Seongkyu replaced Noh as the host for today. Names of the top 18 trainees are called by Yang one by one starting from rank 15. Shin Ryu-jin retains her 1st rank while Kim Hyo-jin replaces Woo Jin-young for the first time. Four new songs are announced afterwards: "Come Over" (produced by Robin) and "Omona" for girls; "I Like It Too" (produced by Kang Wookjin, LIØN, and Diggy) and "What!?" (produced by Kang Wookjin, iHAWK, BIGTONE, and Diggy) for boys. The remaining trainees choose their positions beginning with rank 18 up to 1, with the higher ranked trainees being given the advantage of replacing the lower ranked trainees and bumping them into another song. After finalizing the teams of four groups at the end of the episode, 12 participant representatives' audition presentations or live performances are shown according to their positions: dance, rap, vocal.

=== Episode 14 (January 26, 2018) ===
This episode was broadcast live at the Ilsan Kintex, five days after the last episode. Both Noh Hong-chul and Jang Sungkyu host the show while the final judges include Seungri, Taeyang, Zion.T and Yang Hyun-suk.

All the participants are first introduced one-by-one according to their ranks starting from the men's team. Soon after, they perform "Come Over", "What!?", "Omona", and "I Like It Too", respectively. After their performances, a VTR of the participants watching their individual "Just Dance" re-evaluation (from Episode 4) was shown. They then performed "Just Dance" live with Kim Hyo-jin and Shin Ryu-jin as the centers. Following the performance, the live voting closed and the announcement of Top 9 started. Both Woo Jin-young and Shin Ryu-jin topped the men's and women's team. In the end, men's team won against women's with the score of 8,114 over 7,866. The scores are determined 20% pre-broadcast online votes, 30% text votes during the live show, 20% pre-broadcast online preference rankings, and 30% judges' scores.

== Performances ==
The following table shows the performances and winners during the three battles (Position Battle; Formation Battle; Digital Song Battle) during the show. The four songs performed live on Episode 14 are not listed.

Episode	Battle		Team name	Song (singer/s)	Score	Result/winner	Additional points
Ep. 6	Position Battle	Vocal	Shining Girls	"It Hurts" (2NE1)	2366	KkoJjing (Boys Team)	0
Ep. 6	Position Battle	Vocal	KkoJjing	"It's Ok" (BtoB)	4712	KkoJjing (Boys Team)	2,000
Ep. 6	Position Battle	Rap	9ood 9irl	"My Number" (Cheetah)	1352	Seven Stars (Boys Team)	0
Ep. 6	Position Battle	Rap	Seven Stars	"Born Hater" (Epik High)	3868	Seven Stars (Boys Team)	2,000
Ep. 6	Position Battle	Dance	Benefit	"Boombayah" (Blackpink)	4544	Benefit (Girls Team)	2,000
Ep. 6	Position Battle	Dance	PsychoPass	"Very Good" (Block B)	4294	Benefit (Girls Team)	0
Ep.7	Position Battle	Rap	Auh~!	"Puss" (Jimin)	1984	Nerd'$ (Boys Team)	0
Ep.7	Position Battle	Rap	Nerd'$	"Okey Dokey" (Mino ft. Zico)	3404	Nerd'$ (Boys Team)	2,000
Ep.7	Position Battle	Dance	HotSpot	"Starships" (Nicki Minaj)	4738	HotSpot (Girls Team)	2,000
Ep.7	Position Battle	Dance	One Way	"What Makes You Beautiful" (One Direction)	3630	HotSpot (Girls Team)	0
Ep.7	Position Battle	Vocal	Frontal Breakthrough	"Singing Got Better" (Ailee)	2920	HighQualityst (Boys Team)	0
Ep.7	Position Battle	Vocal	HighQualityst	"Love in the Ice" (TVXQ)	3754	HighQualityst (Boys Team)	2,000
Ep.7	Position Battle	Dance	Mix Nice	"Knock Knock" (Twice)	2806	Mazinger (Boys Team)	0
Ep.7	Position Battle	Dance	Mazinger	"My House" (2PM)	5290	Mazinger (Boys Team)	2,000
Ep.7	Position Battle	Vocal	Bivid	"Rain" (Taeyeon)	3926	Bivid (Girls Team)	2,000
Ep.7	Position Battle	Vocal	Red Socks	"Day One" (K.Will)	3094	Bivid (Girls Team)	0
Ep.7	Position Battle	Dance	CuXy	"Greedy" (Ariana Grande)	4978	CuXy (Girls Team)	2,000
Ep.7	Position Battle	Dance	Just8	"Kiss the Sky" (Jason Derulo)	3766	CuXy (Girls Team)	0
Ep.8	Formation Battle		Lucky Goddess (행운의 여신)	"Genie" (Girls' Generation)	5822	4th place	3,000
Ep.8	Formation Battle		Girlfriend	"('Cause) I'm Your Girl" (S.E.S.)	6164	3rd place	5,000
Ep.8	Formation Battle		Your Girl	"Bad Girl Good Girl" (Miss A)	8024	1st place	10,000
Ep.8	Formation Battle		Really Really (Really를 찾아서)	"Really Really" (Winner)	7798	2nd place	7,000
Ep.8	Formation Battle		Sweet Dream (꿀잠)	"Honey" (KARA)	5395	5th place	0
Ep.9	Formation Battle		Hug'$	"Hug" (TVXQ)	7323	4th place	3,000
Ep.9	Formation Battle		Taeyangyeol (태양열)	"Ringa Linga" (Taeyang)	8015	2nd place	7,000
Ep.9	Formation Battle		It's You (나라고)	"It's You" (Super Junior)	6,459	5th place	0
Ep.9	Formation Battle		Apricot Flavor (살구맛)	"Paradise Lost" (Gain)	8207	1st place	10,000
Ep.9	Formation Battle		King Wang Jjang (킹왕짱)	"Bang Bang Bang" (BigBang)	7719	3rd place	5,000
Ep.11	Digital Song Battle		Excellent Vibe	"Like A Star"	512	Kim Hyun-jin	10,000
Ep.11	Digital Song Battle		Excellent Vibe	"Like A Star"	478	Shin Ryu-jin	7,000
Ep.11	Digital Song Battle		Excellent Vibe	"Like A Star"	342	Jeon Hee-jin	5,000
Ep.11	Digital Song Battle		My9 Me	"Hush"	472	Jung Ha-yoon	10,000
Ep.11	Digital Song Battle		My9 Me	"Hush"	350	Lee Soo-min	7,000
Ep.11	Digital Song Battle		My9 Me	"Hush"	308	Kim Si-hyun	5,000
Ep.11	Digital Song Battle		SSS	"Dangerous Girl"	600	Lee Su-jin	10,000
Ep.11	Digital Song Battle		SSS	"Dangerous Girl"	308	Hwang Ji-min	7,000
Ep.11	Digital Song Battle		SSS	"Dangerous Girl"	288	Jung Sa-ra	5,000
Ep.12	Digital Song Battle		Gangnam station	"Super Freak"	558	Kim Byeong-kwan	10,000
Ep.12	Digital Song Battle		Gangnam station	"Super Freak"	404	Kim Min-seok	7,000
Ep.12	Digital Song Battle		Gangnam station	"Super Freak"	290	Park Min-kyun	5,000
Ep.12	Digital Song Battle		Pyeongchang	"Hand In Hand"	536	Lee Byeong-gon	10,000
Ep.12	Digital Song Battle		Pyeongchang	"Hand In Hand"	314	Shim Jae-young	7,000
Ep.12	Digital Song Battle		Pyeongchang	"Hand In Hand"	286	Woo Jin-young	5,000
Ep.12	Digital Song Battle		9reat!	"Stand By Me"	640	Kim Hyo-jin	10,000
Ep.12	Digital Song Battle		9reat!	"Stand By Me"	328	Yao Ming Ming	7,000
Ep.12	Digital Song Battle		9reat!	"Stand By Me"	262	Lee Jae-jun	5,000

== Discography ==
All singles were released by YG Entertainment and LOEN Entertainment.

=== Part 1 ===
"Part 1"

Single by Mix Nine
- Released: October 29, 2017
- Genre: Soundtrack; K-pop; Dance
- Producer: Teddy

No.	Title	Lyrics	Music	Producer	Length
1.	"Just Dance"	Kush; Joe Rhee; Teddy Park	Teddy Park; Kush; R. Tee; Joe Rhee	Teddy	2:57

=== Part 2 ===
"Part 2"

Single by Sori
- Released: November 5, 2017
- Genre: Soundtrack; Ballad

No.	Title	Lyrics	Music	Length
1.	"To Myself (잘했다 말해주고 싶어)"	Heo Jung-joo (허정주)	Heo Jung-joo (허정주)	2:56

=== Part 3 ===
"Part 3"

Single by Mix Nine
- Released: November 19, 2017
- Genre: Soundtrack; K-pop; Dance
- Producer: Teddy

No.	Title	Lyrics	Music	Length
1.	"Just Dance (Boy ver.)"	Kush; Joe Rhee; Teddy Park	Teddy Park; Kush; R. Tee; Joe Rhee	2:58
2.	"Just Dance (Girl ver.)"	Kush; Joe Rhee; Teddy Park	Teddy Park; Kush; R. Tee; Joe Rhee	2:58

=== Part 4 ===
"Part 4"

Single by Mix Nine
- Released: January 7, 2018
- Genre: Soundtrack; K-pop; Dance

No.	Title	Lyrics	Music	Artists	Length
1.	"Hush"	Kamen Rider (가면라이더); Jung Il-hoon	Kamen Rider (가면라이더); Jung Il-hoon	My9 Me	3:24
2.	"Like A Star"	MC Mong; Minjae (민제)	MC Mong; Minjae (민제); Eastwest	Excellent Vibe	3:30
3.	"Dangerous Girl"	Kim Do-hoon (김도훈); Lee Sang-ho (이상호); Hwasa	Kim Do-hoon (김도훈); Lee Sang-ho (이상호)	SSS	3:42

=== Part 5 ===
"Part 5"

Single by Mix Nine
- Released: January 14, 2018
- Genre: Soundtrack; K-pop; Dance

No.	Title	Lyrics	Music	Artists	Length
1.	"Hand In Hand"	LIØN, Woo Jin-young (우진영); Lee Byung-gon (이병곤); Kim Young-jo (김영조); Shim Jae-young (심재영); Jin Sung-ho (진성호)	Kang Wook-jin (강욱진); LIØN; Diggy	Pyeongchang	3:30
2.	"Super Freak"	Bigtone, iHWAK, Min Yeon-jae (민연재)	Future Bounce, Bigtone, iHWAK	Gangnam station	3:34
3.	"Stand By Me"	MC Mong, Song Han-kyeom (송한겸), Woo Tae-woon	MC Mong, The Channels, Eeastwest, Playground	9reat!	3:22

=== Part 6 ===
Part 6

EP by Mix Nine
- Released: January 27, 2018
- Genres: Soundtrack; K-pop; Dance

No.	Title	Lyrics	Music	Artists	Length
1.	"OMG (어머나)"	Joe Rhee	24; Joe Rhee	Universe	3:06
2.	"Come To Play (놀러와)"	Robin (로빈); Kim Kyung (김경); Bigtone	Robin (로빈); Millennium	Our Home	3:25
3.	"What!? (뭐!?)"	iHWAK; Bigtone; Lee Byeong-gon (이병곤); Woo Jin-young (우진영); Jin Sung-ho (진성호)	Kang Wook-jin (강욱진); iHWAK; Bigtone; Diggy	Top Line	3:21
4.	"I Like it Too(나도 좋아)"	LIØN; Diggy; Kang Wook-jin (강욱진)	Kang Wook-jin (강욱진); LIØN; Diggy	Like 8+1	3:30

== Ratings ==
In the table below, the blue numbers represent the lowest ratings and the red numbers represent the highest ratings.

Episode	Date	Average audience share		
Episode	Date	AGB Nielsen Ratings		TNmS Ratings
Episode	Date	Nationwide	Seoul National Capital Area	Nationwide
1	October 29, 2017	1.919%	NR	1.7%
2	November 5, 2017	1.527%	NR	2.0%
3	November 12, 2017	1.706%	NR	2.1%
4	November 19, 2017	1.301%	NR	1.4%
5	November 26, 2017	0.958%	NR	1.3%
6	December 3, 2017	1.026%	NR	1.2%
7	December 10, 2017	1.178%	NR	1.2%
8	December 17, 2017	1.113%	NR	1.5%
9	December 24, 2017	0.884%	NR	0.9%
10	December 31, 2017	0.641%	NR	0.9%
11	January 7, 2018	0.716%	NR	0.8%
12	January 14, 2018	0.546%	NR	0.8%
13	January 21, 2018	0.7%	NR	0.8%
14	January 26, 2018	1%	NR	0.9%

- This programme aired on a cable channel/pay TV which normally has a relatively smaller audience compared to free-to-air TV/public broadcasters (KBS, SBS, MBC & EBS).
- NR rating means "not reported".

== Aftermath ==
On May 3, 2018, YG Entertainment revealed that the debut for the male winning group had been cancelled.

On June 26, 2018, Happyface Entertainment, whose male trainee Woo Jin Young was set to debut as their center, filed a lawsuit against YG for 10 million Korean won (over 8,800 USD). "More than to be compensated for all the damages we have received, this is a symbolic amount filed in our hopes that Korean popular culture, the home of hallyu, will progress healthily without the overuse of power by large companies," stated a source from Happyface.

On November 26, 2018, representatives from each company presented their arguments at the Seoul Central District Court. The court made the decision to proceed, and the next day of argument was set for January 16, 2019.
