= Woo Jin-young =

South Korean singer and rapper (born 1997)

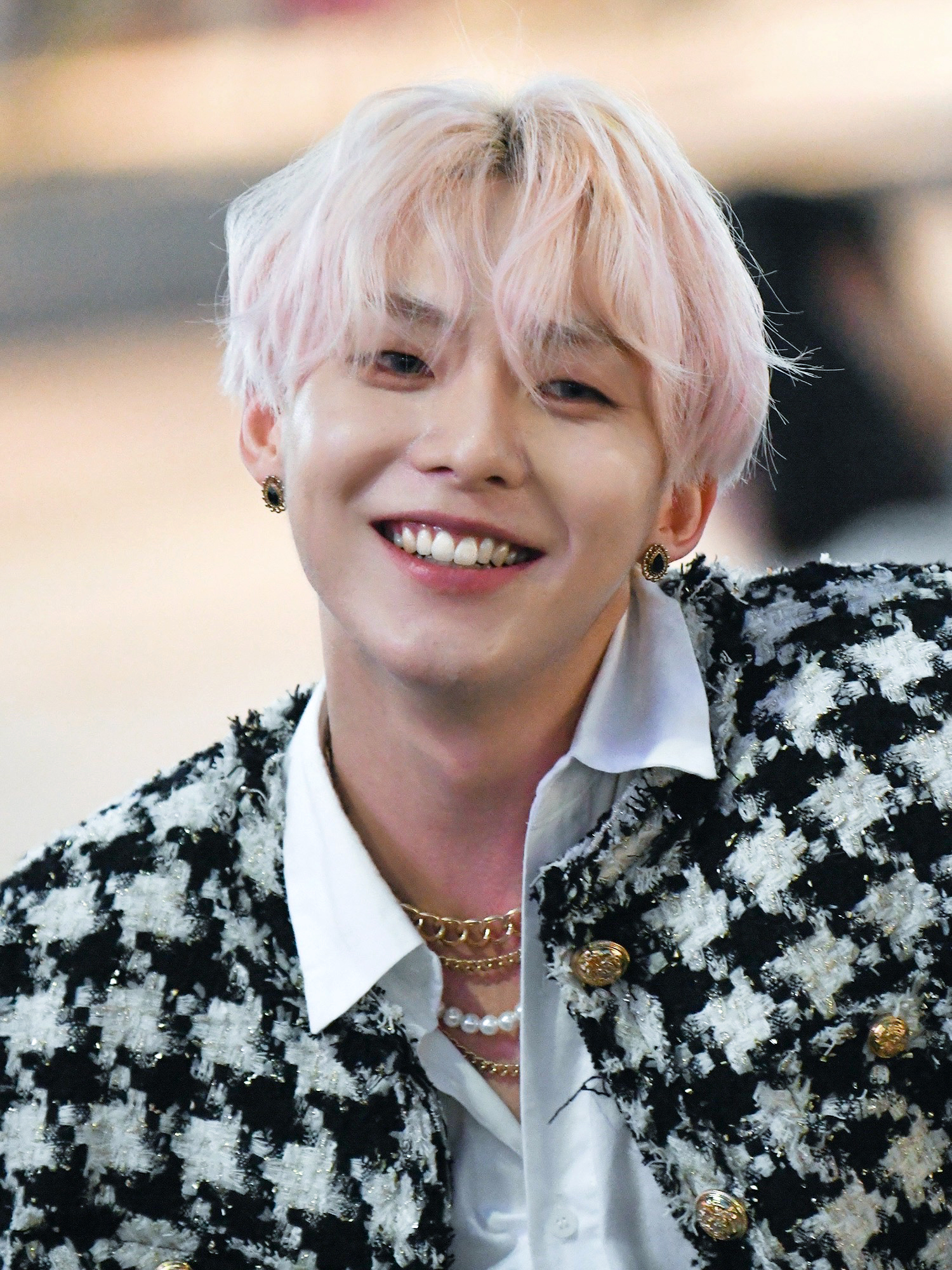
- Woo busking in Sinchon, 2022

Background information
- Born: May 31, 1997 (age 29)
- Genres: K-pop; hip hop
- Occupations: Singer; rapper
- Instruments: Vocals
- Years active: 2017–present
- Label: Dreamcatcher
- Formerly of: HNB; D1ce

Korean name
- Hangul: 우진영
- Hanja: 禹眞榮
- RR: U Jinyeong
- MR: U Chinyŏng

Woo Jin-young (Korean: 우진영; born May 31, 1997) is a South Korean singer and rapper. During his tenure as a trainee with Happy Face Entertainment (now Dreamcatcher Company), he was a contestant on the reality survival series Produce 101 and Mix Nine, where he competed to debut in an idol group. He found success in the latter and ranked number one in the competition, but the group never materialized due to failed contract negotiations between the show creator YG Entertainment and the artists' respective agencies.

Woo released a collaborative extended play (EP) entitled [Present] in 2018 with singer Kim Hyun-soo. Woo competed in the rap competition series Show Me the Money in 2019, but failed to advance past the first evaluation round. He then debuted as a member of D1ce that year. He released his first solo mini-album [3-2=A] in 2021 and his second Delicious in 2022.

== Early life ==
Woo Jin-young was born on May 31, 1997. He is the younger of two sons, with an eight-year gap between them. Woo wanted to become a singer when he was in middle school, which his family opposed due the job instability. He passed the School of Performing Arts Seoul entrance exam for the Department of Practical Music. At the behest of his parents, who felt that singers had short careers, Woo gave up on the school. Instead, he enrolled in an acting hagwon in its Department of Theater and Film upon passing the qualification exam.

== Career ==
=== Produce 101, Mix Nine, Show Me the Money 8 ===
Woo was trainee at JYP Entertainment for approximately six months and he began penning rap lyrics at age 19. He briefly halted his training to care for his father, who died of a cerebral and myocardial infarction in 2016. He later joined Happy Face Entertainment and participated in the second season of Mnet's survival reality series Produce 101 (2017), where contestants competed to become a member of the boy group Wanna One. The contenders performed in front of panel of judges and Woo was ranked number 55 in the first episode. For his rap performance the following week, he was placed in the letter "C" level and moved up to number 50. After the contenders' performed the season's theme song "It's Me (Pick Me)", they received reevaluations and Woo was placed in "A" level. In the second round, Woo was eliminated and ranked number 40. Woo, along with fellow HF Music Company trainees and Produce 101 contestants Park Woo-dam, Jung Won-cheol, and Jo Yong-geun, released a special single entitled "Be the Light" on June 26.

Woo contended in JTBC's survival reality series Mix Nine and competed to debut in a nine-member boy group under YG Entertainment. In the first round of online voting, he ranked number one among male idols. He remained at the summit every week until the penultimate episode upon being overtaken by fellow contestant Kim Hyo-jin, but Woo finished in first placed at the end of the competition. The nonet was set to make its debut in April 2018. However, winners of the competition were not contacted by YG Entertainment regarding their forthcoming debut. CEO of the company Yang Hyun-suk later presented the members' agencies with a three-year contract and following failed negotiations, the debut of the group was canceled.

In June 2018, Happy Face Entertainment filed a lawsuit against YG Entertainment, claiming that its failure to debut Woo in a group following the conclusion of Mix Nine violated its contract. The agency also alleged that YG engaged in "abuse of power" for offering contract terms which differed from the original. The suit requested ₩10,000,000 (US$7,000) in compensation for the damages incurred. The suit was dropped the following April, with a representative of Woo stating that they had accepted the production team's sincere apology and that the two sides had amicably settled the dispute.

Woo took part in the eighth season of the rap competition series Show Me the Money (2019), but failed to move beyond the initial preliminary round. He was given the opportunity of a reexamination, which he passed and moved on to the next round. However, he was eliminated in the following evaluation round.

=== D1ce and solo ventures ===
Happy Face Entertainment announced the group HNB (Happyface Next Boys) consisting of Woo and other trainees with the agency, and they held a fan meeting in May 2018. The following month, Woo released a collaborative extended play with Mix Nine runner-up Kim Hyun-soo entitled [Present]. As part of HNB, the group released the special single "You Are So Beautiful" later that year. In March 2019, Woo was confirmed as a member of his agency's forthcoming quintet D1ce housed under the newly formed D1ce Company. The group debuted on August 1 with its first mini-album Wake Up: Roll the World.

Woo released his first solo mini-album [3-2=A] and its lead single "Happy Birthday" on June 5, 2021. He contributed to the lyrics and composition on all tracks on the record. In commemoration of his 300th day since solo debut, Woo released the digital single "Unbelievable" on April 4 and its special clip ten days later. His second mini-album Delicious and its title track were released on July 12, 2022.

== Musical style ==
Woo's lyrical themes revolve around daily life; he reads books to extend his imagination into his songwriting. Upon listening to G-Dragon's rendition of "This Love", he was inspired to start rapping. In addition to G-Dragon, he cites Gaeko of Dynamic Duo and Kendrick Lamar as his role models.

== Discography ==
=== Albums ===
==== Extended plays ====
Title	Details	Peak chart positions	Sales
Title	Details	KOR	Sales
[Present] (with Kim Hyun-soo)	Released: June 14, 2018; Label: Happy Face, Kakao; Format: CD, digital download	15	KOR: 2,525
[3-2=A]	Released: June 9, 2021; Label: D1ce, Sony Music; Format: CD, digital download	66	
Delicious	Released: July 12, 2022; Label: D1ce, Sony Music; Format: CD, digital download	100	KOR: 608

=== Singles ===
==== As lead artist ====
Title	Year	Album
"Falling in Love" (설레고 난리; seollego nalli) (with Kim Hyun-soo)	2018	[Present]
"Happy Birthday"	2021	[3-2=A]
"Unbelievable"	2022	Non-album single
"Delicious"	2022	Delicious
"How Are You Doing?"	2023	How Are You Doing?
"25°C"	2023	Non-album singles
"Don't Worry Be Happy"	2024	Don't Worry Be Happy
"Lost"	2025	IWFY
"Back"	2025	IWFY

==== As part of HNB ====
Title	Year	Album
"Be the Light" (빛이 될게; bichi doelge) (with Park Woo-dam, Jung Won-cheol, and Jo Yong-geun)	2017	Non-album single
"You Are So Beautiful" (너 참 예쁘다; neo cham yeppeuda) (with Park Woo-dam and Jung Yoo-jun)	2018	Non-album single

== Filmography ==
=== Television shows ===
Year	Title	Role	Ref.
2017	Produce 101	Contestant	
2017	Mix Nine	Contestant	
2019	Show Me the Money 8	Contestant	
2019	King of Mask Singer	Contestant	

== Concerts ==
- Happy Talk Show (2017), with Park Woo-dam
