= Shin Jee-won =

South Korean actress (born 1996)

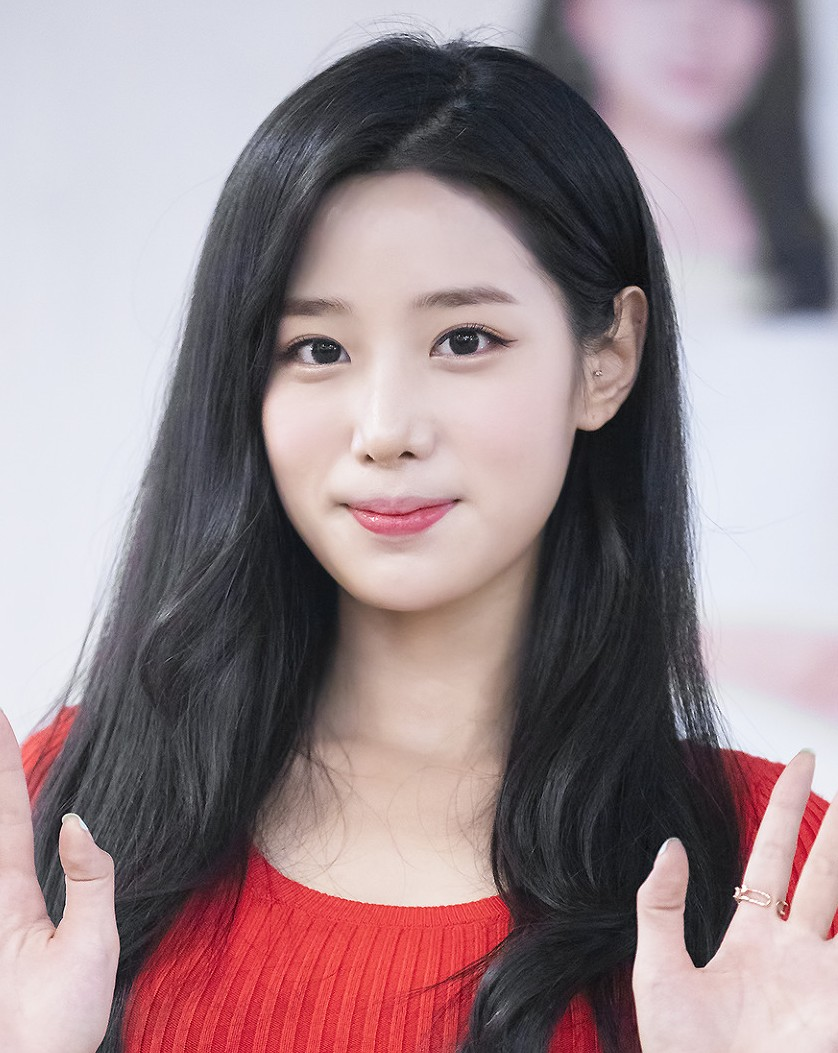
- Shin in 2018
- Born: April 14, 1996 (age 30); Seongnam, South Korea
- Education: Dongduk Women's University – Broadcast and Entertainment
- Occupations: Actress; television personality
- Years active: 2016–present
- Agent: Ghost Studio
- Musical career
- Also known as: Johyun
- Genre: K-pop
- Instrument: Vocals
- Years active: 2016–2021
- Label: JTG
- Formerly of: Berry Good

Korean name
- Hangul: 신지원
- Hanja: 申知原
- RR: Sin Jiwon
- MR: Sin Chiwŏn

Shin Jee-won (Korean: 신지원; born April 14, 1996), formerly known by her stage name Johyun (조현), is a South Korean actress, television personality, and singer. She is best known as a former member of the girl group Berry Good. Following the group's disbandment, Shin turned to an acting career.

== Early life and education ==
Shin Jee-won was born in Seongnam, South Korea, on April 14, 1996, from a former ballerina. She was active as a short track skater from elementary school to the first year of junior high school before suffering an injury that made her quit, and going to study abroad. In 2006, she came first place with a record of 49.51 seconds in the 500m race for female elementary 3rd-4th graders at the 9th National Men's and Women's Short Track and Speed Skating Competition. She became an idol trainee in 2013.

She graduated from Dongduk Women's University, majoring in Broadcasting and Entertainment.

== Career ==
=== 2016–2021: Debut with Berry Good, Mixnine and solo activities ===
Shin was introduced as the sixth member of Berry Good in late October 2016. She made her official debut on November 1, with the release of their second mini album Glory. Her stage name Johyun was a homage to actress Joey Wong, who's known as Wang Jo-hyun in Korean.

In autumn 2017, she joined the cast of talk show We're Also National Athletes, talking about her experience as a short track skater ahead of the Pyeongchang Winter Olympics. She also competed in the reality survival show Mixnine, finishing 24th and being eliminated.

In 2018, she co-hosted the MBC game show Begin A Game. The following year, she made a name for herself in the esports world thanks to her passion for League of Legends, ultimately joining two related shows: Game Dolympics 2019: Golden Card and Egame of Thrones. She competed in the latter one with the Jangtan Gamedan team, reaching the finals.

In 2020, she co-hosted the cable variety show Things These Days alongside Kim Yu-bin and Jun Hyo-seong, had a supporting role in the noir movie The Dragon Inn and was in the main cast of Strange School Tales: The Child Who Wouldn't Come, a horror miniseries. In 2021, she scored her first leading role in the horror thriller movie Hypnosis, and hosted the second season of Things These Days alongside Heo Young-ji.

=== 2021–present: Group disbandment and acting career ===
On May 12, 2021, JTG Entertainment announced its merger with Starweave Entertainment and the consequent disbandment of Berry Good; Shin moved to Starweave to pursue her acting career. Later in November, she joined the cast of webseries Cherry Blossoms After Winter as the female lead. On January 30, 2022, she co-hosted the MBC special program leading to the Beijing Winter Olympics.

On January 11, 2023, she left JTG and signed with Ghost Studio, continuing her acting career under her birth name.

== Filmography ==
=== Film ===
Year	Title	Role	Ref.
2020	The Dragon Inn	Ye-joo	
2021	Hypnosis	Hyun-jung	
2026	Karlovy Vary	Kang Ha-na	

=== Television series ===
Year	Title	Role	Notes	Ref.
2017	Circle	Announcer	Cameo (ep. 1)	
2019	Level Up	Member of girl group Artemis	Cameo (ep. 2, 8–9)	
2020	Men Are Men	Yu-na	Cameo (ep. 1)	
2020	Strange School Tales: "The Child Who Wouldn't Come"	Min-ji		
2025	Walking on Thin Ice	Soo-jin		

=== Web series ===
Year	Title	Role	Ref.
2022	Cherry Blossoms after Winter	Nam Ji-ah	
2023	The Villain of Romance	Go Yun	
2024	Ghost Cupid: Kisslighting	Na Iso	

=== Television shows ===
Year	Title	Role	Notes	Ref.
2017	We're Also National Athletes	Cast member		
2017–18	Mixnine	Contestant	Finished 24th	
2018	Comedy Big League 5	Special MC	Season 5	
2018	Begin A Game	Host		
2018–19	Real Men 300	Cast member		
2019	Game Dolympics 2019: Golden Card	Cast member		
2019	Egame of Thrones	Cast member		
2019	2019 Idol Star Athletics Championships Chuseok Special	Cast member		
2020	Law of the Jungle in Chuuk	Cast member		
2020–21	Things These Days	MC	with Yubin, Jun Hyo-seong and Heo Young-ji	

=== Music video appearances ===
Year	Song Title	Artist	Ref.
2016	"Play Hot and Cold (말랑말랑)"	Jin Won (with Lee Ji-ae)	
