= Gongchan =

South Korean singer and actor (born 1993)

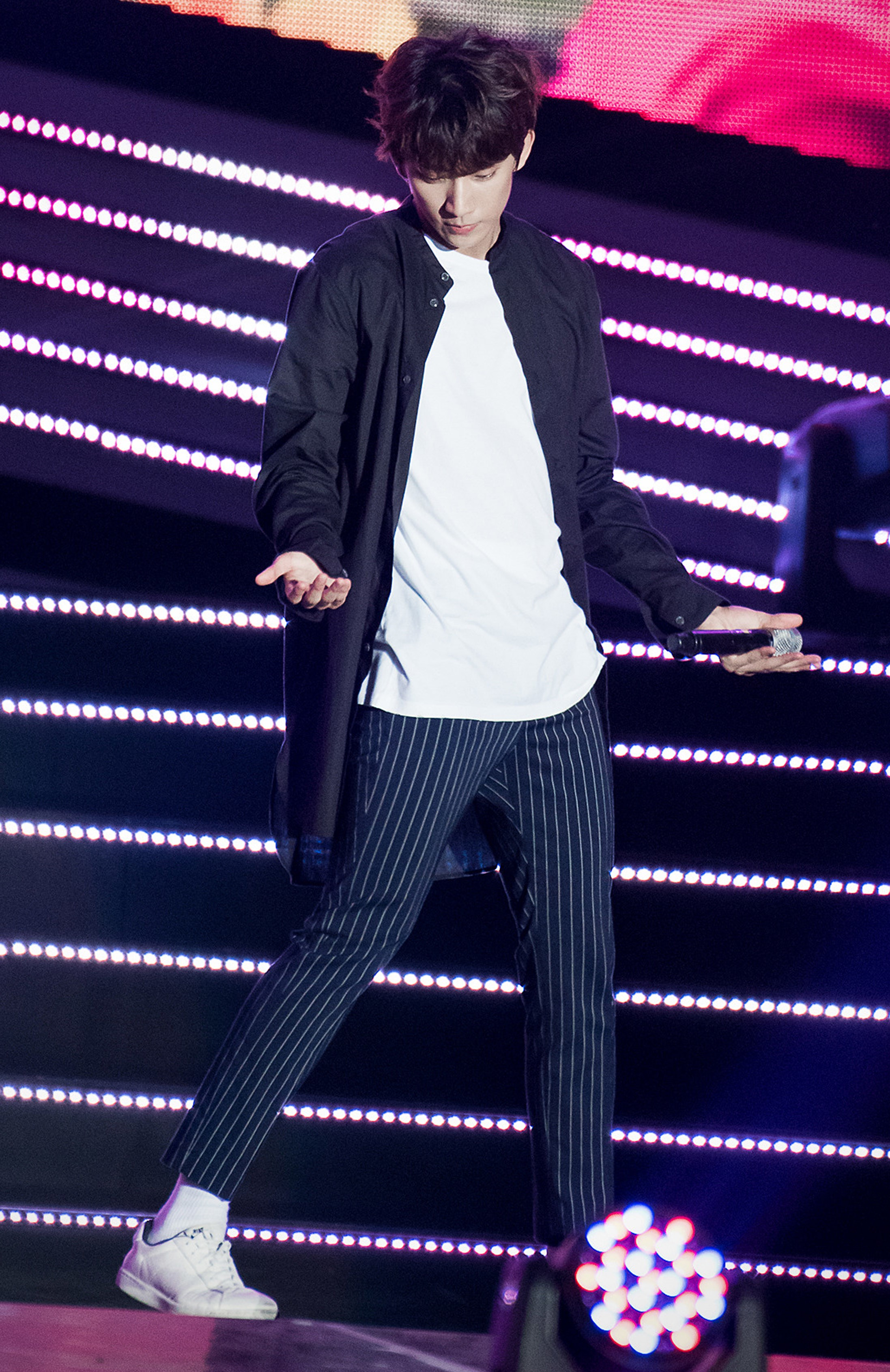
- Gongchan at WFMF concert in September 2016
- Born: Gong Chan-sik; August 14, 1993 (age 32); Suncheon, South Korea
- Occupations: Singer; actor
- Musical career
- Genres: K-pop
- Instrument: Vocals
- Years active: 2011–present
- Label: WM
- Member of: B1A4

Korean name
- Hangul: 공찬식
- Hanja: 孔燦植
- RR: Gong Chansik
- MR: Kong Ch'ansik

Gong Chan-sik (Korean: 공찬식; born August 14, 1993), better known by his stage name Gongchan (공찬), is a South Korean singer and actor, best known as a member of the South Korean boy group B1A4.

== Career ==
=== Pre-debut ===
Gongchan was discovered on the website Cyworld as a result of his winning of an "Eoljjang Challenge" when he was in middle school. He was also a runner-up in a cross-dressing contest, where he danced to a song by soloist Ivy. He then underwent a training period of two years.

=== 2011–present: Debut and Solo activities ===
After years of training, Gongchan was introduced as the third member of B1A4 on April 13, 2011. The group officially debuted in late-April 2011 with the first EP "Let's Fly".

In August 2015, Gongchan became one of the new MCs on the fourth season of KBS' A Song For You. In October 2015, Gongchan confirmed to made his acting debut with cast in web-drama Delicious Love.

In early 2017, Gongchan was announced to cast as the first main character for the new mobile game, I Need Romance, developed by Take One Company. The game, a first-person virtual reality simulation dating game, has Gongchan in the role of Eun Sehyun, a top-idol and leader of the boy group Don't Touch for 5 years who is known as the representative 'chic-idol'. He interacts with the user, who plays the opposing main character.

In June 2018, Gongchan renewed his contract with WM. After renewing his contract with WM, Gongchan was confirmed to hosted in GMTV's music program Bus Riding on the Bus. In November 2018, Gongchan was hosted in MBC's game program Begin a Game.

In May 2019, Gongchan was cast as the male lead in web-drama Travel Romance Season 1.5.

In July 2019, Gongchan announced his first birthday fanmeeting, 2019 B1A4 BANA [HAPPY GONGCHAN DAY].

In October 2019, Gongchan starred in the web-drama To My Name as the character Yoo Jae-ha. Later that year, Gongchan confirmed to cast on his first movie titled Mr.Boss, which schedule to release in 2020.

In 2023, Gongchan acted in his first BL drama Unintentional Love Story, which is based on the webtoon with same name, along with his main co-star Cha Seo Won who played his romantic interest. In July 2023, Gongchan confirmed to cast in web-drama My Best Boyfriend X My Best Boyfriend, schedule to aired in October.

In August 2024, Gongchan left WM after his contract ended and would continue his group's activities under WM.

== Personal life ==
=== Military service ===
In July 2012, Gongchan underwent a nephrectomy after being diagnosed with congenital ureteropelvic junction obstruction. His physician stated that one of his kidneys had completely lost function.

He was subsequently exempted from mandatory military service as a result of the surgery.

== Filmography ==
=== Film ===
Year	Title	Role
2020	Mr. Boss	Hyun Joon

=== Television ===
Year	Title	Role
2020	Lonely Enough To Love	Jung Hoon

=== Web series ===
Year	Title	Role	Ref.
2015	Delicious Love	Park Sung-Jun	
2019	Travel Through Romance Season 1.5	Heo Joon	
2019	To My Name	Yoo Jae-Ha	
2021	Mokkoji Kitchen	Moo-Young	
2023	Unintentional Love Story	Ji Won-Young	
2023	My Best Boyfriend X My Best Boyfriend	Cha Eun-hwan	

=== Video games ===
Year	Title	Role	Notes
2017	I Need Romance	Eun Se-hyun	Main character Virtual online dating simulation game

=== Variety shows ===
Year	Title	Notes
2015	Global Request Show: A Song For You 4	Host
2018	Begin A Game	Host
2019	Beauty Room	Host
2019	Wanna Play? GG	Host (ep.7-present)
