= Dear Hyeri =

2024 South Korean television series

- Promotional poster
- Hangul: 나의 해리에게
- Lit.: To My Haeri
- RR: Naui Haeriege
- MR: Naŭi Haeriege
- Genre: Romance; Psychological drama; Workplace
- Written by: Han Ga-ram
- Directed by: Jung Ji-hyun; Heo Seok-won
- Starring: Shin Hye-sun; Lee Jin-wook; Kang Hoon; Jo Hye-joo; Kang Sang-joon
- Music by: Lim Ha-young
- Country of origin: South Korea
- Original language: Korean
- No. of episodes: 12

Production
- Executive producers: Choi Han-gyul; Lee Han-sang; Lee Se-hee
- Producers: Jang Kyung-ik; Yoo Sang-won; Kim Sun-tae; Ahn Il-hwan; Cho Sang-hee; Kim Mi-kyung; Jung Da-sol; Choi Moon-hee
- Cinematography: Kang Yoon-soon; Gu Ja-hoon; Park Se-hee; Han Jung-hee
- Editor: Oh Sang-han
- Running time: 60 minutes
- Production companies: Studio Dragon; Studio Him; Midsummer Studio

Original release
- Network: Genie TV; ENA
- Release: September 23 – October 29, 2024

Dear Hyeri (Korean: 나의 해리에게) is a 2024 South Korean romance psychological drama television series written by Han Ga-ram, co-directed by Jung Ji-hyun and Han Seok-won, and starring Shin Hye-sun, Lee Jin-wook, Kang Hoon, Jo Hye-joo, and Kang Sang-joon. The series is about a woman who develops a new personality. It aired on ENA from September 23, to October 29, 2024, every Monday and Tuesday at 22:00 (KST), and subsequently streaming on Genie TV. It is also available for streaming on Viki in selected regions.

== Synopsis ==
Announcer Joo Eun-ho develops a new personality due to a deep emotional wound. Her ex-boyfriend Jung Hyun-oh, on the other hand, has kept his emotional wounds tightly hidden.

== Cast and characters ==
=== Main ===
- Shin Hye-sun as Joo Eun-ho / Joo Hye-ri
  - Kim Si-eun as young Joo Hye-ri
1. Joo Eun-ho: An unknown announcer of 14 years who struggles to get a chance to make her name known, to the point where there is a joke following her: "If you fall backwards, your nose will break". She is still hurt by the breakup with her long-time lover Hyun-oh.
2. Joo Hye-ri: Eun-ho's other personality. She is a scholarship student and parking attendant with an extremely positive mindset.
- Lee Jin-wook as Jung Hyun-oh
  - Moon Woo-jin as young Jung Hyun-oh

A star announcer and Eun-ho's ex-boyfriend. He became a star as soon as he joined the company, earning him the nickname "a guy who can do anything". However, due to his generous and kind personality to everyone around him, except for his girlfriend, he frequently clashes with Eun-ho.

- Kang Hoon as Kang Joo-yeon

A graduate of the Korea Military Academy who became an announcer due to the wish of his deceased brother. He is a man who looks neat but is not sociable.

- Jo Hye-joo as Baek Hye-yeon

An all-rounder MZ announcer who has been in unrequited love with Joo-yeon for three years and is vulnerable to loneliness.

- Kang Sang-joon as Moon Ji-on

A man who has a crush on Eun-ho. He has a playful side like a friend but is also a straightforward young adult.

=== Supporting ===
- Fila Lee as Moon Soo-jung

Hyun-oh's next-door cousin who works as a freelance writer for cultural broadcasting.

- Jeon Bae-soo as Kim Shin

The team leader of the announcer department. He is Eun-ho and Hyun-oh's college senior and does not hesitate to say harsh words.

- Kim Tae-rin as Shim Jin-hwa

An MZ announcer who is Eun-ho and Hyun-oh's junior. She is the news bureau chief's favorite and threatens Eun-ho's position.

== Production ==
=== Development ===
The series was co-directed by Jung Ji-hyun, who directed Search: WWW (2019), You Are My Spring (2021), Twenty-Five Twenty-One (2022), and Lies Hidden in My Garden (2023) and Heo Seok-won, written by Han Ga-ram, who wrote When the Weather Is Fine (2020), planned by KT Studio Genie, and co-produced by Studio Dragon and Studio Him.

=== Casting ===
In January 2024, Shin Hye-sun was reported to play the role of Joo Eun-ho, the female lead of the series. The next month, Lee Jin-wook was reported to appear as the lead actor for the series and reviewing it at that time. Kang Hoon was reportedly cast as the other lead actor of the series in May.

Shin, Lee, and Kang were confirmed to appear for the series in June 2024, while Jo Hye-joo was confirmed in the next month.

=== Filming ===
Principal photography began in the middle of May 2024.

== Release ==
Dear Hyeri was expected to be released in the second half of 2024 on Genie TV and ENA. ENA confirmed the broadcast date and time of the series to be on September 23, 2024, every Monday and Tuesday at 22:00 (KST). It would also be available to stream on Viki.

== Viewership ==
Dear Hyeri : South Korea viewers per episode (thousands)

Season	Episode number												Average
Season	1	2	3	4	5	6	7	8	9	10	11	12	Average
1	443	434	424	526	597	765	634	755	665	759	593	652	604

Source: Audience measurement performed nationwide by Nielsen Korea.

Average TV viewership ratings
Ep.	Original broadcast date	Average audience share (Nielsen Korea)	
Ep.	Original broadcast date	Nationwide	Seoul
1	September 23, 2024	2.024% (3rd)	2.380% (3rd)
2	September 24, 2024	2.163% (3rd)	2.449% (3rd)
3	September 30, 2024	2.154% (2nd)	2.158% (3rd)
4	October 1, 2024	2.390% (3rd)	2.855% (2nd)
5	October 7, 2024	2.848% (1st)	3.215% (1st)
6	October 8, 2024	3.493% (1st)	3.822% (1st)
7	October 14, 2024	3.099% (2nd)	3.505% (2nd)
8	October 15, 2024	3.499% (1st)	4.117% (1st)
9	October 21, 2024	3.303% (1st)	3.577% (1st)
10	October 22, 2024	3.582% (1st)	3.705% (1st)
11	October 28, 2024	2.709% (3rd)	3.057% (1st)
12	October 29, 2024	3.348% (1st)	3.952% (1st)
Average		2.884%	3.233%
In the table above, the blue numbers represent the lowest ratings and the red numbers represent the highest ratings.; This drama aired on a cable channel/pay TV which normally has a relatively smaller audience compared to free-to-air TV/public broadcasters (KBS, SBS, MBC, and EBS).
