= Very Berry (EP) =

EP by Berry Good
- Released: April 20, 2016
- Recorded: 2014–2016
- Genre: K-pop; Dance; Ballad
- Length: 24:07
- Label: Asia Bridge Entertainment, JTG Entertainment, CJ E&M (distributor)

Berry Good chronology
Love Letter (2014)	Very Berry (2016)	Glory (2016)

Singles from Very Berry
- 1. "Love Letter" Released: May 22, 2014; 2. "Because of You" Released: February 9, 2015; 3. "My First Love" Released: September 23, 2015; 4. "Angel" Released: April 20, 2016

Very Berry is the EP by South Korean girl group Berry Good. The album contains seven tracks and is led by title track "Angel". It was released on April 20, 2016, as result of the crowdfunding campaign launched on March 11 on Makestar. The ₩10 million goal was reached in ten days.

The song "Love Letter" was released as the group's debut single album on May 22, 2014, one day after its music video. It is a remake of the song released by Click-B in 2000.

== Track listing ==
No.	Title	Lyrics	Music	Arrangement	Length
1.	"Together" (함께했음)	Lee Ji-min; Kang Jeon-myung; Nam Ki-sang	Nam Ki-sang; Park Ki-hyun; Kwon Sun-ik	Park Ki-hyun	3:38
2.	"Angel"	Jung Seong-yoon	Joo Tae-young; The Grand	The Grand	3:18
3.	"Because of You" (요즘 너 때문에 난)	Joo Tae-young; Trust Me	Joo Tae-young	Joo Tae-young	3:08
4.	"Love Letter"	Joo Tae-young	Joo Tae-young	Mental Audio	3:18
5.	"My First Love" (내 첫사랑)	Joo Tae-young	Joo Tae-young	Taez Piano	3:49
6.	"Together" (함께했음 (Inst.))		Nam Ki-sang; Park Ki-hyun; Kwon Sun-ik	Park Ki-hyun	3:38
7.	"Angel" (Inst.)		Joo Tae-young; The Grand	The Grand	3:18
Total length:					24:07

== Charts ==
Chart	Peak position
Gaon weekly album chart	23
Gaon monthly album chart	46

=== Sales ===
Provider (2016)	Amount
Gaon physical sales	1,307+
