= Moon Ho-joon =

South Korean gamer

Moon Ho-joon (문호준)
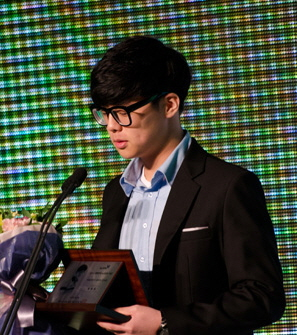
- Born: June 23, 1997 (age 29); Gunsan, North Jeolla Province, South Korea
- Occupation: Gamer

YouTube information
- Channel: 문호준
- Years active: 2015–present
- Subscribers: 552,000
- Views: 531 million
- Last updated: 4 August 2026

Moon Ho-joon is a South Korean professional Crazyracing Kartrider player and video game streamer. He plays for Hanwha Life Esports. Moon announced his retirement from individual competitions after winning the 2020 SKT JUMP Kartrider League season 1.

In June 2020, Moon won a total of 19 awards in the regular league. This includes awards for thirteen championships, three runners-up, and three third places. Moon Ho-joon won 5th, 9th, 10th, 11th, 13th, 14th, and the 15th Kartrider League, Dual Race season 1 team competition, three individual competitions, team wins, one individual competition in 2019 season 1, 2020 season 1 team competition, and individual competition.

On February 25, 2013, Moon joined Star Treasures. Kart Rider announced his temporary retirement until the league turned into an individual match. He also participated in the StarCraft II League. In 2015, he collaborated with Jeon Dae-Woong, Kang Seok-in, and Jang Jin-Hyung to return to the KartRider League. In 2020, he teamed with Park Do-Hyun, Choi Young-hoon, Bae Sung-bin, and Lee Eun-taek in the first season of the SKT JUMP KartRider League.

== Kart League ==
=== 4th–10th Leagues ===
In the 4th Kart League, he had advanced to the 1st round final, then collapsed in the 2nd half of the game. He was hit by a retirement in the mine and ended up in 7th place. In the 2nd round, he did not continue to the quarter-final as he was placed 6th in the group. However, he succeeded in winning the third round and was considered a big three with Yoo Im-duk and Cho Hyun-joon, but came in third due to Kang Jin-woo's performance.

In round 5, he won back-to-back prizes in various competitions and took the main position. He won the KeSPA Cup, the National Cyber Sports Festival, and won the first and third rounds of the 5th league, setting a record of winning two of the first three rounds. In the Grand Final, he competed with the same on-game team, Jeong Seon-ho. It seemed difficult to win the 16th mine track, but he won the last two games, winning the first place in the last two consecutive games, and catching up with the 10-point gap.

In the next round of the 6th League, Kang Ho-Jun was the runner-up, as Kang Jin-woo won both rounds for the first time in six consecutive games.

In the 7th league, he won the second round and went to the Grand Final as the top overall. In the final, defending champion Kang Jin-woo and bike syndrome Kang Suk-in competed for the championship. In the beginning, all three of them were winning, but they had to watch Kang Jin-woo and Kang Seok-in as they caught up in the middle of the race. Kang Seok-in was third after Kang Jin-woo, who won and finished runner-up.

The 8th league went straight to the finals, winning the first-round title over Kang Jin-woo and Kim Jun. He finished third in the second round. In the final, struggling in the cold weather, Kang Jin-woo retires from the ice, chasing Kim Jin-hee, who took first place while Kang Seok-in and Kim Jun were down due to a lack of backing. He caught up with Kim just before the final game and finished first overall, but was runner-up when Kim Jin-hee came back in the final game.

In the preliminary round of the 9th round of the league, Jeong Seon-ho was the next runner-up to the round final, and in the early and mid-half of the round final, he showed his strength, beat Jeong Seon-ho, and won the right to go straight to the final second place after Kang Jin-woo. In the second round qualifying round, Kang Seok-in and Jeon Dae-Woong will be in the same group for four consecutive games before advancing to the round final with first place and succeeding in defeating Kang Jin-woo in the second round final. He swept the top spots in the long-awaited final, widening the gap with runner-up Jang Jin-hyeong to win an overwhelming victory. Since then, Moon Ho-jun has shown his best skills during the round, but he has escaped from being unable to win and began sweeping the championship title.

In the 10th league, he was sluggish in the beginning. In Group A of the first round, Kim Sun-il and Kang Jin-woo won first place, but they were defeated by Jang Jin-Hyung and Yoo Young-hyuk in the first round final and did not even get the right to go directly to the Grand Final. However, he showed outstanding performance throughout the second round and won the second round, and succeeded in advancing to the Grand Final as the top overall. And in the Grand Final, he won an overwhelming victory as he played beyond the last league final and finished in 14 games. He dominated the race by widening the gap with Kang Jin-woo, who collapsed after retiring on the broken ice track and reaped his first and third consecutive wins by renewing his first and second-highest gap titles held by Kang Suk-in in the seventh league with an 18-point gap of 84:66.

=== 11th–17th Leagues ===
The KartRider League was reopened in May 2010. The 11th League was carried out in double-elimination rather than straight to the final through the previous round championship. In the 11th league qualifying round, he lost to Jeon Dae-Woong for two consecutive times and finished second both times, especially in the first round, when he almost fell to third place behind Park Joon-hyuk as well as Jeon Dae-Woong but managed to come from behind to take second place. Finally, he made it to the winner's match in second place in the group.

Contrary to expectations that he would show a better performance in the winner's game, he showed signs of uneasiness even in the winner's game. Jeon Dae-Woong not only won first place by himself but also was defeated by Yoo Young-hyuk in third place, showing his regretful appearance as a defending champion. In the final, people expected Jeon Dae-Woong to win the championship, which defeated Moon for three consecutive games, and Moon did not seem to be able to perform his old skills with a poor reputation, overturning all expectations and beating Jeon Dae-Woong and Yoo Young-hyuk after the middle of the final to compete against Park in the run-up to the championship. Park In-Jae showed sluggish performance during his pursuit and suffered a crisis to the point where there was only a four-point gap before the final match, but he shook off Park In-Jae's pursuit at the last-minute Norte U Express and won three consecutive titles.

In the 12th league, despite being in the same group as Yoo Young-hyuk in the preliminaries, he recorded perfect again after a long time and won the winner's game, and was given a yellow rider. But in the final, Yoo Young-hyuk was unexpectedly sluggish while playing in five games in the first half. While Jeon Dae-Woong and Yoo Young-hyuk were playing, Moon Ho-jun continued to fall to the bottom, and while Yoo Young-hyuk clinched the title in 13 games, he competed with Kim Taek-hwan for third place and almost failed to win the prize, let alone win, but he won first place in a row in the last minute, driving out Kim Taek-hwan and taking third place.

In the 13th league, Lee Yo-han was ranked first in the first group qualifying round and Lee Yo-han in the second round, but in the first and second overall points, Jeon Dae-Woong, Yoo Young-hyuk, and Lee Jung-sun, who showed terrifying force, were ranked first in the first round. In the final round, the big three were in a close race with Yoo Young-hyuk and Jeon Dae-Woong due to the war. Until the last game, Moon Ho-joon, 77 points, Yoo Young-hyuk, 77 points, and Jeon Dae-Woong, 72 points were unknown until the end, but after playing at the beginning of the last map, the bridge of fate, he took the first place and kept the first place to the end without narrowing the gap with the second place, he beat defending champion Yoo Young-hyuk and won five times.

In November 2011, Nexon KartRider won six times in the 14th league. Moon Ho-jun, who entered the emperor mode in Group A in the first round of the first round, finished the game in five games in a row and advanced to the winner's competition in the second round. In the second round of the winner's match, the team decided to advance to the final by virtually winning first place, and the winner's game turned into a competition for second place and dragged on in the middle of the game, but it awakened again in the second half and went straight to the first place with a huge gap with runner-up Yoo Young-hyuk.

Indeed, in the long-awaited final, he finished in 11 games with six first and four-second-place wins in the 80-point lead method. At that time, the score gap with runner-up Jeon Dae-Woong was 44 points, and the gap between the first and second place was greater than the gap between second and eighth place. In a word, he showed an unprecedented Yanghak show.

Moon Ho-jun's 11 games remain the shortest title of the game to date, with 80 points. This is more than the 14th game of Moon Ho-jun himself, who won the overwhelming title, and 13 games of Yoo Young-hyuk in the 12th league, while the 44-point gap between the first and second place also far exceeds the 18 points Moon Ho-jun, who won the overwhelming 10th league.

The 15th league of Nexon KartRider opened on February 9, 2012. Yoo Young-hyuk and Jeon Dae-Woong, who made it to the first place in a row in the group preliminaries, finished first and second in the winner's competition, and finished third behind him, but the expectation of winning the Grand Final was that Moon Ho-jun was the first to win the Grand final, and he made a mistake while recording the final perfect score in the early part of the final, but he made a mistake by himself. While Yoo Young-hyuk, who had been sluggish in the early stages, topped the list for five consecutive games in six to 10 games, he ate only 13 points and the gap narrowed to 63 to 62. Since then, both Yoo Young-hyuk and Moon Ho-jun have struggled and can't eat a few points, and have won seven times by finishing first in the last reverse lobby.

It changed from the 16th league to a two-man game, and came up with a drastic rule revision, which calls for the use of reinforced parts (instead, the use of a carnation body with a set tuning condition) and the abolition of the hot rider. Joining Shin Ha-neul in the 16th League as a team of yawns. As his only competitor, Jeon Dae-Woong, did not play this season due to a wrist injury, there was no immediate problem. At the beginning of the final, Moon Ho-joon and Shin Ha-neul were both sluggish, failing to stop Yoo Young-hyuk and Park Hyun-ho from playing, and Moon Ho-joon revived in the second half and tried to take care of the team by winning five consecutive first place, but Shin lost the title after suffering a serious slump of only 34 points out of 111 points.

On January 10, 2013, he participated in the 17th KartRider League as a team called Mun Myeong-ju and Sailor Moon. In the first round of the second round, he won the first place in the group to advance to the final round but was eliminated in the semi-finals. In an interview, he temporarily retired, saying, "I will play again when my league style changes to an individual match."

=== Evolution League ~ Burning Time League ===
Nexon KartRider has returned from the League Evolution. In the final, he lost the speed match 4 to 3, and lost to Yoo Young-hyuk by 0.005 seconds in the ace decision game by winning the item match by only 4 to 3, and finished runner-up in the return league in 899 days and about 3 years.

The team lost to Hwang Sun-min in a close game from the winner's match to the ace's final match against D.A. Engineering and fell to the loser's revival. The problem is that one of the two players, Moon Ho-Joon and Yoo Young-hyuk, is on the verge of being eliminated from the group stage of the first round of the finals as they met Yoo Young-hyuk's Alstaz again in the consolation match. In the end, he was eliminated in the first round for the first time since his debut due to the worst shoveling and team kill ever since his debut, and the loss of 3:0 in the speed match and 3:2 in the item match.

=== Dual Race ~ Dual Race 2 ===
In the individual league, he also comfortably advanced to the finals as the No. 1 player in the group, but he played 10 games due to his poor performance in the early stages, and his rival Yoo Young-hyuk and super rookie Yoo Chang-Hyun finished the game after scoring 60 points in nine games. However, Moon Ho-jun was given a green seed in the best-of-breed league as he advanced to the finals as the third-place finisher in the group, but in the 11th and 15th leagues, he lost in the second round to Jeon Dae-Woong and Yoo Young-hyuk and was expected to show better performance than the preliminary round, but ended up in third place in the final with quite a lot of ups and downs. However, in the 14th league, which was in its heyday in the final of the team competition, he won first place four times out of six games and crushed the one-racing perfectly, and after showing good performance in the item match, he finally lifted the 8th trophy.

In the pre-voting for the individual final of the dual race season 2, he was still considered the top favorite, despite his disappointment in the team match and supported by more than a majority of users. However, Kim Seung-tae and Kim Jung-je showed a stormy run at the beginning of the game, widening the gap with the median, and Moon Ho-joon himself was also frequently involved in big accidents, which eventually led to the worst performance ever. He must have been very unlucky, but he continued to be involved in accidents and eventually failed to advance to the second round. As a result, Moon Ho-jun had to embrace the dishonor and dishonor of failing to win his first career in the individual league since his debut.

=== Dual Race 3 ~ Dual Race X ===
He teamed up with Jeon Dae-Woong, Kang Seok-in, and Choi Young-hoon in the 2018 Dual Race Season 3. The individual team advanced to the final with an overwhelming first place, and the team match won against Penta Xenics led by Yoo Young-hyuk in the quarterfinals, but in the semi-final winner's match, the team was pushed back to the final match by losing 2:4 due to Yoo Young-hyuk's sensation play. In the final match, he finally succeeded in advancing to the final after an unexpected item match against Oz-FANTASTICK.

In the individual final, he said he was worried that he didn't practice the individual competition because he was concentrating on the team final, but when he entered the game, he won the 1:1 match against Yoo Young-hyuk, who won the bout 9 in the final three sets after winning the overwhelming first place in both the quarterfinals and the semi-finals.

In the team final that followed, he showed overwhelming speed again, winning all sets including speed and item competition, becoming the first-ever Kart League player to win the V10, double-digit title. And for the first time, he won both individual and team titles in the same league.

In August 2018, Nexon teamed up with Park Do-Hyun, Bae Sung-bin, and Choi Young-hoon under the name of Afreeca Flame in the event league "Dual Race X," which was held by Nexon himself. At first, Yoo Young-hyuk's team was selected as the winner, but in the team match, he advanced to the final with three wins in three matches, and in the individual quarterfinals, he finished second behind Park In-soo, but advanced to the semi-finals. While Park In-soo swept the top spot with an overwhelming appearance in the semi-finals, Moon Ho-joon himself was eliminated from fourth place with his form jagged throughout the game.

==== 2019 Season 1 and Season 2 ====
In the best-of-five best-of-five match in the second set, Park In-soo was shovel-killed in downtown Dubai and lost the first track, but he won three consecutive games to achieve V11 of glory. In the final match of the team match, he continued his individual performance and made two perfect matches with Yoo Young-hyuk in the speed match, but Choi Young-hoon and Kang Seok-in were sluggish and lost, but he won the item match and went to the ace final round, but unfortunately, he knelt down in front of Park In-soo, who met again in the square Santa secret space, and the two wins in the league failed.

He did not make it to the second round in the individual competition and lost to Bae Sung-bin in the final round, finishing fourth. In the team match that followed, the team lost the speed match by 2:4 and lost by 0:4 in the item match, which was called the strongest, and the team game that they wanted so much again suffered a second-place finish.

==== 2020 Season 1 ====
Hanwha Life's winning all four games came in his first place. Although the item match was swept by 0:4, Lee Jae-hyuk, the ace final match in the third set, and Lee Jae-hyuk, the owner of the mine, won the game after a close battle with three laps, and won the victory himself, winning the honorable V13, the team match V3, the second two major wins, and the first victory in the 21st century among professional sports teams sponsored by Hanwha.

== StarCraft II ==
He joined StarCraft on February 25, 2013, declaring that Starcraft 2 and KartRider would join him. However, he left Startail in October 2014 and was seen playing KartRiders with Korean players such as Chinese professional gamers and Lee Joong-sun in association with Jeon Dae-Woong on an internet broadcast. His reason for retirement was clear, so he did not show up in the official league.

== Retirement ==
On May 25, he announced his retirement from the individual competition on his personal broadcast. His 15-year career ended with a record of V10 at the end of the first individual event of the 2020 season.
