= Favorite (group) =

South Korean girl group

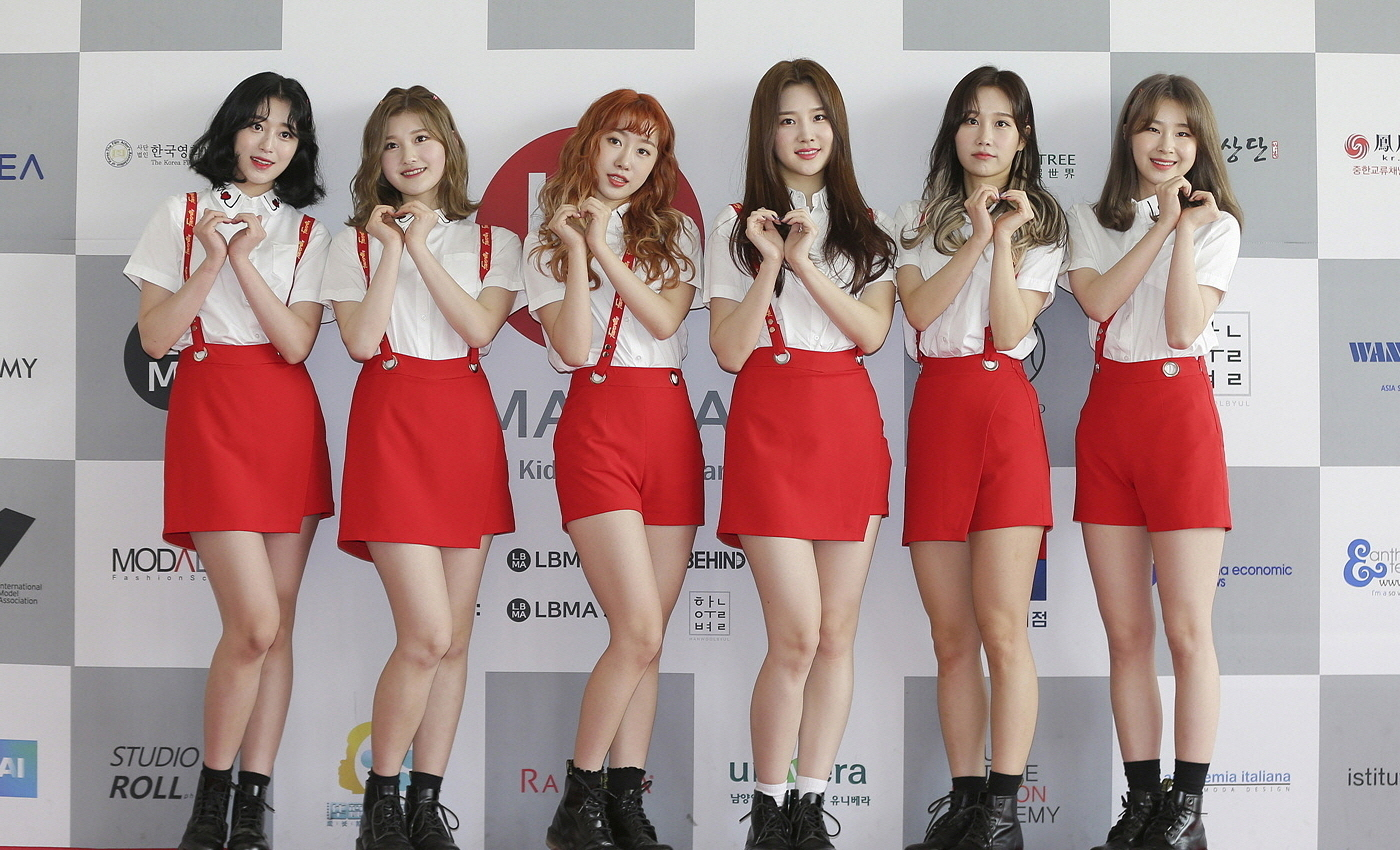
- Favorite at LBMA Star in 2018

Background information
- Origin: Seoul, South Korea
- Genres: K-pop
- Years active: 2017–2024
- Labels: Astory; EnterVision
- Past members: Saebom; Seoyeon; Gaeul; Sugyeong; Jeonghee; Ahra
- Website: favorite.astoryent.com favorite-official.jp

Favorite (Korean: 페이버릿) was a South Korean girl group formed by Astory Entertainment in 2017. They debuted on July 5, 2017, with extended play My Favorite. The group debuted in Japan with single album Catch Me, released on November 6, 2019. The members have confirmed the disbandment of the group on their 7th anniversary.

== Members ==
Sourced from Favorite's official japanese website.

- Saebom (새봄) – lead vocal
- Seoyeon (서연) – sub vocal, lead dancer
- Gaeul (가을) – leader, main rapper
- Sugyeong (수경) – main dancer
- Jeonghee (정희) – sub vocal
- Ahra (아라) – main vocal

== Discography ==
=== Extended plays ===
Title	Album details	Peak chart positions	Sales
Title	Album details	KOR	Sales
My Favorite	Released: July 5, 2017; Label: Astory Entertainment, Genie Music; Formats: CD, digital download; Track listing: 1. Hello; 2. Party Time; 3. My Day; 4. You're My Favorite (온 힘을 다해); lit. With All My Might	26	KOR: 1,037
Love Loves to Love Love	Released: May 10, 2018; Label: Astory Entertainment, Genie Music; Formats: CD, digital download; Track listing: 1. It's Mine (딱 내꺼); 2. Where Are You From? (어느별에서 왔니?); 3. Liar; 4. Heart Signal (하트 시그널)	35	KOR: 1,061
Loca	Released: January 15, 2019; Label: Astory Entertainment, Kakao M; Formats: CD, digital download; Track listing: 1. Loca; 2. Fancy; 3. Hush; 4. Two of Us (둘이서); 5. Loca (Inst.)	31	KOR: 1,022

=== Single albums ===
Title	Album details	Peak chart positions	Sales
Title	Album details	JPN	Sales
Catch Me	Released: November 6, 2019; Label: Enter Vision, Universal Music Japan; Formats: CD, digital download; Track listing: 1. Catch Me; 2. Do Do Do; 3. Loca (Japanese ver.) (Type A); 4. Party Time (Japanese ver.) (Type B)	42	JPN: 1,321 (Phy.)

=== Singles ===
Title	Year	Peak chart positions		Sales	Album
Title	Year	KOR	JPN	Sales	Album
"Party Time"	2017	—	—	—N/a	My Favorite
"Where Are You From?" (어느별에서 왔니?)	2018	—	—	—N/a	Love Loves to Love Love
"Loca"	2019	—	—	—N/a	Loca
"Catch Me"	2019	—	42	JPN: 1,321 (Phy.)	Catch Me
"Lie" (또 Lie)	2020	—	—	—N/a	Non-album single
"—" denotes releases that did not chart or were not released in that region.

== Videography ==
=== Music videos ===
Title	Year	Director
"Party Time"	2017	이현지
"Where Are You From?"	2018	Lee Sagang (Zanybros)
"Loca"	2019	Hong Won-Ki (Zanybros)
"Catch Me"	2019	Shohei Ogawa (Showmov Inc.)
"Lie"	2020	모리 카츠히코

== Concert ==
=== Showcase ===
- Favorite Japan Debut Showcase「Favorite First Time in Japan」(2019)
