= Berry Good =

South Korean girl group (2014–2021)

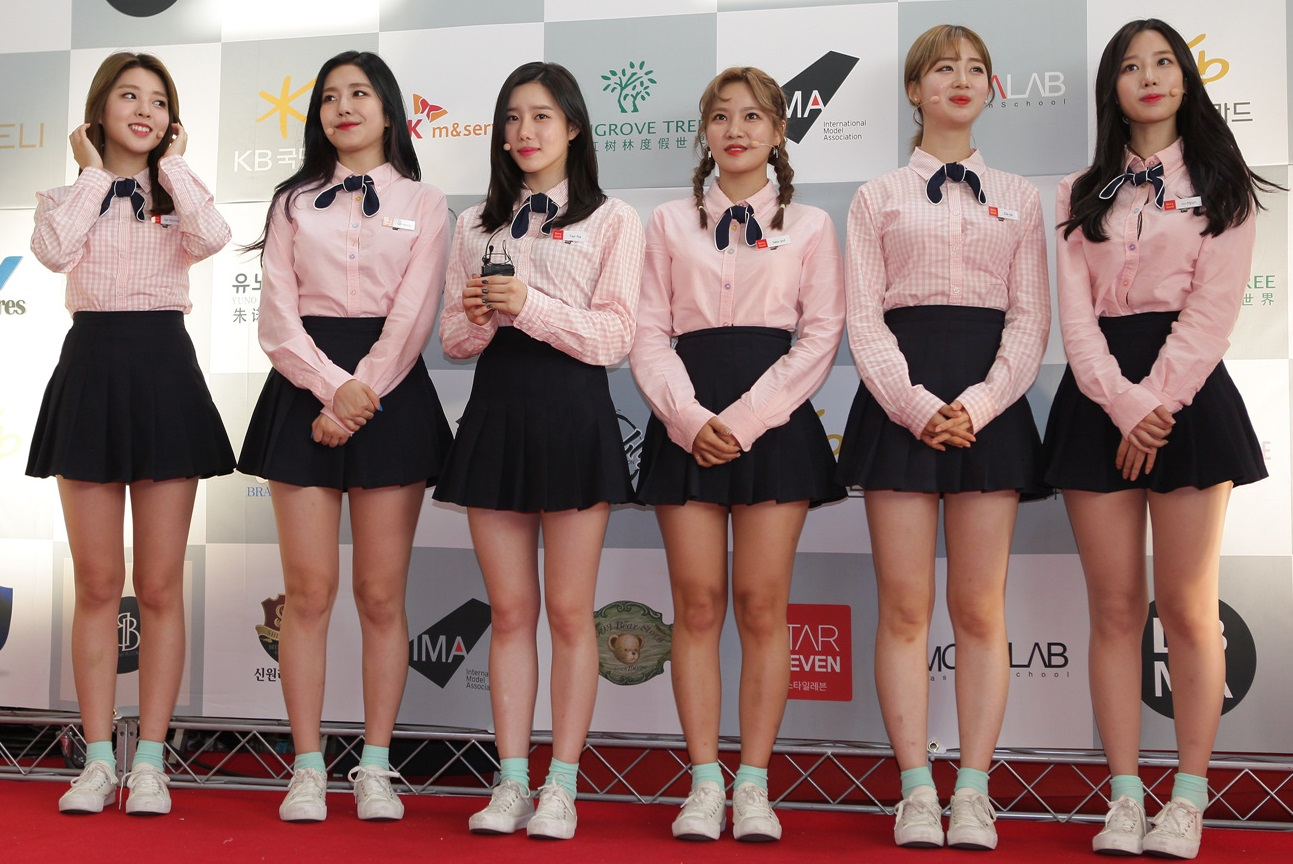
- Berry Good in 2017 at LBMA Star Awards. From left to right: Sehyung, Gowoon, Taeha, Seoyul, Daye and Johyun

Background information
- Origin: Seoul, South Korea
- Genres: K-pop; dance; EDM
- Years active: 2014–2021
- Labels: Asia Bridge; JTG
- Spinoffs: Berry Good Heart Heart
- Past members: Subin; Iera; Nayeon; Daye; Taeha; Seoyul; Gowoon; Johyun; Sehyung
- Website: official website

Berry Good (Korean: 베리굿) was a South Korean girl group formed by Asia Bridge Entertainment in 2014. They released their debut single Love Letter on May 21, 2014, as a quintet, then, after two line-up changes, they were mainly active as a sextet consisting of original members Taeha and Gowoon and new members Seoyul, Daye, Sehyung and Johyun. They officially disbanded on May 12, 2021.

== History ==
=== 2014–2015: Debut and line-up changes ===
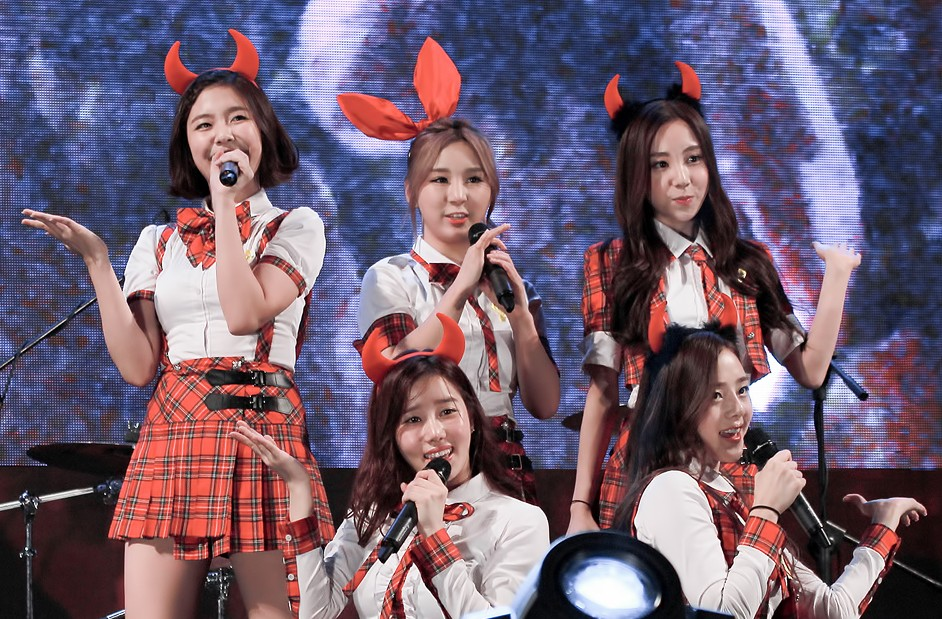
Berry Good performing in June 2014

Berry Good debuted on May 21, 2014, with the music video for "Love Letter", a remake of the song released by Click-B in 2000. The eponymous single was released the following day, when they also started promotions on M! Countdown.

In January 2015, Asia Bridge Entertainment stated that Subin, Iera and Nayeon had left the group to concentrate on their studies, and introduced new member Seoyul, followed by Daye and Sehyung.

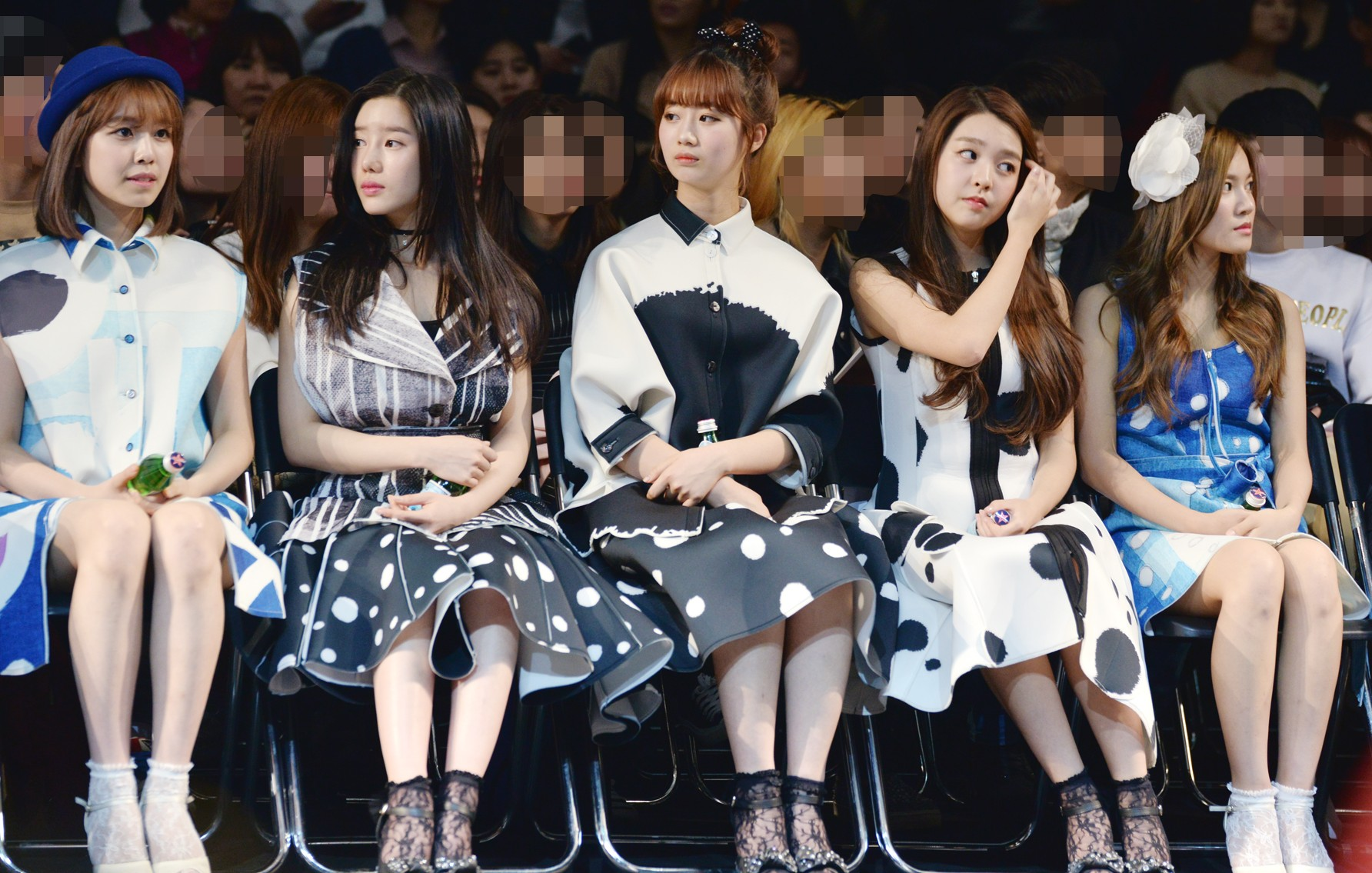
Berry Good at the 2015 Seoul Fashion Week, on March 22, 2015

Their second single Because of You was released on February 9. They started promotions on February 10 on SBS MTV's The Show. In June, their representative office launched various Berry Good goods (such as accessories, clothes and cosmetics) in China.

On September 23, their third single My First Love was released. Two music videos were produced, one of which features actress Kim Bo-ra. The song, posthumous work of composer Joo Tae-young, was first performed in advance on September 20 at Hallyu Dream Concert, and promotions started on September 22 on The Show.

=== 2016–2017: New member Johyun and further releases ===
On March 11, Berry Good launched a crowdfunding campaign to produce their first EP on Makestar. The ₩10-million goal was reached in ten days and the campaign ultimately raised ₩16,084,438, 160.8% of its original goal. On April 20, the crowdfunded mini-album Very Berry, led by title track "Angel", was released.

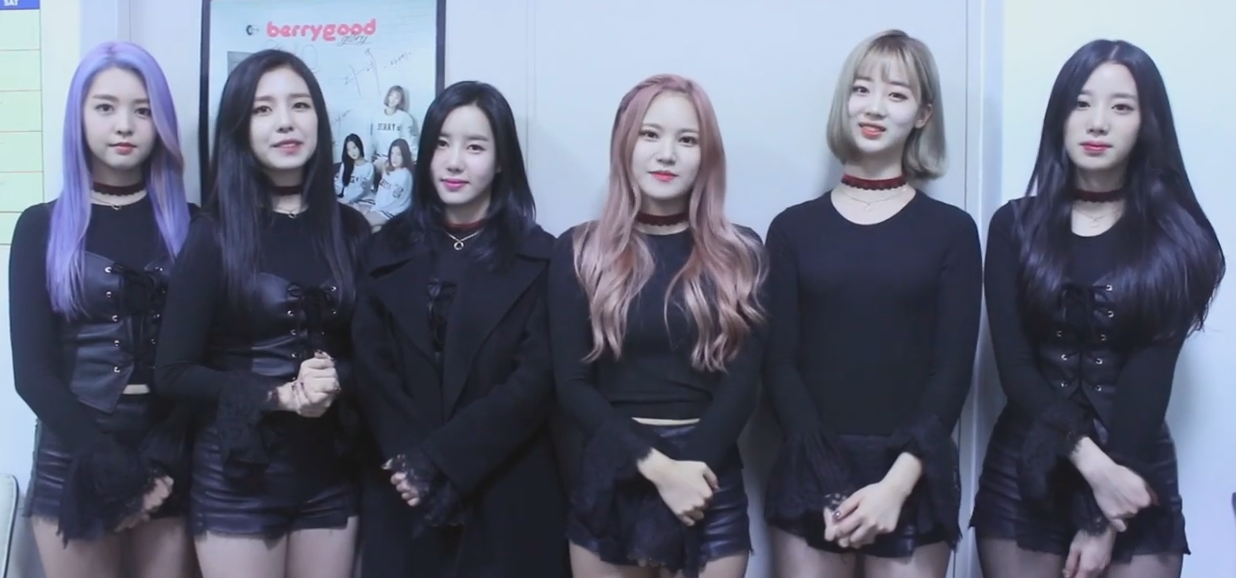
Berry Good in November 2016

Their following release was crowdfunded on Makestar as well. The project started on September 1 as a new single, but it was later upgraded to a mini album, and ended raising ₩26,896,790, 268.97% of its original 10-million goal. The group also added a sixth member, Johyun. Three out of four songs from the EP, including the lead track "Don't Believe", were showcased on Arirang Radio's K-poppin' one day before their release. The official music video for "Don't Believe", and the group's second mini album Glory, were released on November 1.

A third Makestar project was launched on March 9, 2017 to finance their sixth digital single Bibbidi Bobbidi Boo. While the song was released on April 16, its music video was uploaded to the group's YouTube channel the day after. To promote Bibbidi Bobbidi Boo, Berry Good adopted a "part-timer concept", experiencing part-time works between schedules and sending proceeds to the needy. On June 9, they performed three songs at the Thống Nhất Stadium of Ho Chi Minh City, Vietnam.

=== 2018–2019: First sub-unit, first full-length album and Taeha's departure ===
Taeha, Sehyung and Gowoon debuted in the group's first sub-unit, Berry Good Heart Heart, on April 27, 2018, releasing their digital single Crazy, Gone Crazy. On August 16, the group made a comeback with their first studio album Free Travel, that they had been recording since August 2017. They commemorated the release through a showcase held that afternoon at Ilji Art Hall in Cheongdam-dong. After promoting the lead single "Green Apple", in September they went on with B-side "Mellow Mellow", but Sehyung sat out due to an ankle fracture; despite participating in their single This Winter, released on December 15, she was on hiatus until March 1, 2019.

On October 18, 2018, Berry Good held their first concert in Japan, at Shinjuku Blaze in Tokyo. They released their third mini-album, Fantastic, on May 25, 2019 with "Oh! Oh!" serving as the title track, as a five-member group, with Daye resting due to health issues. They started comeback promotions that same day on Show! Music Core, but, two days later, Taeha announced her contract had expired and she would no longer be in the group. Berry Good therefore discontinued the album's promotional activities.

=== 2020–2021: Members departure and disbandment ===
On November 5, 2020, Berry Good returned with the new digital single "Accio" as a quartet. It was included in their fourth extended play Undying Love, which was released on January 19, 2021.

On February 22, 2021, Gowoon and Seoyul announced that their contracts have expired and they would be leaving the group.

On May 12, 2021, Berry Good officially disbanded after discussions with the remaining members. JTG Entertainment announced they've been acquired by Star Weave Entertainment, Johyun will be joining Star Weave Entertainment, while Sehyung will leave the agency.

== Image and musical style ==
Berry Good didn't have a fixed basic image, changing it for every release. They started their career with dance tracks, before releasing their first ballad "My First Love" in September 2015. To promote "Don't Believe" in November 2016, Berry Good underwent a change of styling and concept to take off the original girlish, neat and pure image, adding EDM and tropical house elements to their music.

== Members ==
- Subin (수빈) – rapper
- Iera (이라) – rapper
- Nayeon (나연) – vocalist
- Daye (다예) – vocalist, rapper
- Taeha (태하) – leader, vocalist
- Gowoon (고운) – vocalist
- Seoyul (서율) – vocalist
- Johyun (조현) – vocalist, rapper
- Sehyung (세형) – vocalist, rapper

Sub-units

- Berry Good Heart Heart: Taeha, Sehyung, Gowoon

== Discography ==
=== Studio albums ===
Title	Album details	Peak chart positions	Sales
Title	Album details	KOR	Sales
Free Travel	Released: August 16, 2018; Label: JTG, Kakao M; Format: CD, digital download; Track listing: 1. Green Apple (풋사과); 2. Mellow Mellow; 3. Rainbow (빨주노초파남보); 4. Give It Away; 5. Sorry Sister (미안해 언니); 6. My Day (나와나의날); 7. Fly (Flying Kiwi); 8. Can I Dream Again (다시 꿈꿀 수 있을까); 9. A God Damn Love (그놈의 사랑); 10. Green Apple (풋사과) (Inst.); 11. Mellow Mellow (Inst.); 12. Thanks To (Hidden Track) [CD only] [A talk message from the member on the album cover.]	26	KOR: 1,497

=== Extended plays ===
Title	Details	Peak chart positions	Sales
Title	Details	KOR	Sales
Very Berry	Released: April 20, 2016; Label: Asia Bridge, JTG, CJ E&M; Format: CD, digital download	23	KOR: 1,307
Glory	Released: November 1, 2016; Label: JTG, CJ E&M; Format: CD, digital download; Track listing: 1. Don't Believe (안 믿을래); 2. 1 to 10 (하나하나); 3. Fall in Love (나와 사랑을 해); 4. Sugar Sugar; 5. Don't Believe (안 믿을래) (Inst.)	25	KOR: 1,450
Fantastic	Released: May 25, 2019; Label: JTG, Kakao M; Format: CD, digital download; Track listing: 1. Oh! Oh!; 2. One Step Closer; 3. Dancing in the Moonlight (달빛아래 춤을); 4. Daddy Long Legs (키다리 아저씨); 5. This Winter (이 겨울에)	38	KOR: 944
Undying Love	Released: January 19, 2021; Label: JTG, Ogam; Format: CD, digital download; Track listing: 1. Time For Me (할래); 2. 하루이틀 웃고 사흘나흘 웃고; 3. Accio (함께떠나요); 4. Time For Me (할래) (Inst.)	65	KOR: 833

=== Single albums ===
Title	Album details	Peak chart positions	Sales
Title	Album details	KOR	Sales
Love Letter	Released: May 22, 2014; Label: Asia Bridge, KT; Format: Digital download	—	—N/a
"—" denotes releases that did not chart or were not released in that region.

=== Singles ===
Title	Year	Peak chart positions	Sales (DL)	Album
Title	Year	KOR DL	Sales (DL)	Album
"Love Letter" (러브레터)	2014	—	—N/a	Love Letter
"Because of You" (요즘 너 때문에 난)	2015	296	KOR: 15,648	Very Berry
"My First Love" (내 첫사랑)	2015	— (Note: "My First Love" did not enter the Gaon Download Chart, but it peaked at number 149 on the domestic download chart.)	KOR: 7,513	Very Berry
"Angel"	2016	— (Note: "Angel" did not enter the Gaon Download Chart, but it peaked at number 386 on the domestic download chart.)	KOR: 3,243	Very Berry
"Don't Believe" (안 믿을래)	2016	—	—N/a	Glory
"Bibbidi Bobbidi Boo" (비비디 바비디 부)	2017	—	—N/a	Non-album singles
"Crazy, Gone Crazy" (난리가 난리가 났네) (as Berry Good Heart Heart)	2018	—	—N/a	Non-album singles
"Green Apple" (난풋사과)	2018	—	—N/a	Free Travel
"Mellow Mellow"	2018	—	—N/a	Free Travel
"This Winter" (이 겨울에)	2018	—	—N/a	Fantastic
"Oh! Oh!"	2019	—	—N/a	Fantastic
"Accio" (함께떠나요)	2020	—	—N/a	Undying Love
"Time For Me" (할래)	2021	125	—N/a	Undying Love
"—" denotes releases that did not chart or were not released in that region.

=== Soundtrack appearances ===
Title	Year	Peak chart positions	Sales (DL)	Album	Member(s)
Title	Year	KOR	Sales (DL)	Album	Member(s)
"The Only Love" (하나의 사랑)	2015	—	—N/a	My Mother is a Daughter-in-law OST Part 4	Gowoon
"Have Strength" (힘을 내)	2016	—	—N/a	Bubbly Lovely OST Part 1	Taeha, Seoyul, Daye, Sehyung, Gowoon
"Hello"	2017	—	—N/a	Our Gap-soon OST Part 15	Taeha, Seoyul, Daye, Sehyung, Gowoon
"I Love You" (사랑해요)	2017	—	—N/a	Bad Thief, Good Thief OST Part 6	Seoyul, Daye, Sehyung, Gowoon
"Vamos"	2018	—	—N/a	Just Dance OST Part 3	Seoyul, Daye and Gowoon
"Well Come to the Bom"	2019	—	—N/a	Spring Turns to Spring OST Part 1	Taeha, Seoyul and Gowoon
"—" denotes releases that did not chart or were not released in that region.			—N/a		

== Music videos ==
Year	Title	Director
2014	"Love Letter"	Kim Eun-yoo
2014	"Love Letter" (Acoustic Ver.)	Unknown
2015	"Because of You"	Park Byeong-hwan
2015	"Because of You" (Acoustic Ver.)	Unknown
2015	"My First Love"	Lee Kwang-jin
2015	"My First Love" (Kim Bo-ra Ver.)	Unknown
2016	"Angel"	Plipsied
2016	"Don't Believe"	Im Seok-jin
2017	"Bibbidi Bobbidi Boo"	Lee Won-woo
2018	"Crazy, Gone Crazy" (as Berry Good Heart Heart)	Lee Yoo-young, Lee Jae-hyun
2018	"You&You" (Taeha's solo)	Unknown
2018	"Green Apple"	Kim Kwang-eun
2018	"Mellow Mellow"	Kim Kwang-eun
2019	"A Slow Coming Winter" (Seoyul's solo)	Unknown
2019	"Oh! Oh"	Ryan S. Jhun
2020	"Accio"	
2020	"Accio (Performance Ver.)"	
2021	"Time for Me"	Junoh Seol
2021	"Time for Me (Performance Ver.)"	Junoh Seol

== Filmography ==
=== Television series ===
Year	Title	Role	Notes	Ref.
2019	Level Up	Girl group Artemis	Cameo (ep. 2, 8–9)	
2020	Men Are Men	Girl group Angel-i	Cameo (ep. 1)	

=== Reality shows ===
Year	Title	Ref.
2017	Berry Good TV	

== Awards and nominations ==
Name of the award ceremony, year presented, award category, nominee(s) of the award, and the result of the nomination
Award ceremony	Year	Category	Nominee(s)/work(s)	Result	Ref.
Asia Artist Awards	2019	Starnews Popularity Award (Girl Groups)	Berry Good	Longlisted	
LBMA STAR Awards	2017	Rookie Star Award	Berry Good	Won	
