= Idol Star Athletics Championships =

South Korean television program

- Genre: Sports, Reality Television
- Country of origin: South Korea
- Original language: Korean
- No. of series: 21

Original release
- Network: MBC
- Release: September 25, 2010 – present

The Idol Star Athletics Championships (Korean: 아이돌스타 육상 선수권 대회, abbr. 아육대) is a South Korean reality television program which aired for the first time in 2010. The program features celebrities, most notably Korean pop idols singers and groups, which compete in multi-sport events. The show is broadcast by MBC.

== Idol Star Athletics Championships ==
Key
▪︎	Indicates Chuseok Special

Championship	Year	Venue	Broadcast Dates	Events			Competitors	Ref.
Championship	Year	Venue	Broadcast Dates	Total	Men	Women	Competitors	Ref.
I▪︎	2010	Mokdong Stadium	September 25 and 26, 2010	10	5	5	130 (16 teams)	
II	2011	Jamsil Arena	February 5 and 6, 2011	7	4	3	140 (17 teams)	
III▪︎	2011	Mokdong Stadium	September 13, 2011	11	6	5	150 (12 teams)	
IV	2012	Jamsil Arena	January 24 and 25, 2012	12	6	6	150 (16 teams)	
V	2012	Mokdong Stadium	July 25 and 26, 2012	14 (2 mixed)	7	5	150 (9 teams)	
VI	2013	Goyang Gymnasium	February 11 and 20, 2013	10 (1 mixed)	5	4	150 (10 teams)	
VII▪︎	2013	Goyang Gymnasium	September 19 and 20, 2013	10	5	5	160 (5 teams)	
VIII	2014	Jamsil Arena	January 9 and 10, 2014	10	5	5	230+ (8 teams)	
IX	2015	Goyang Gymnasium	February 19 and 20, 2015	9	5	4	~220 (22 teams)	
X▪︎	2015	Goyang Gymnasium	September 28 and 29, 2015	8	4	4	~300 (10 teams)	
XI	2016	Goyang Gymnasium	February 9 and 10, 2016	9 (1 mixed)	4	4	~180 (7 teams)	
XII▪︎	2016	Goyang Gymnasium	September 15, 2016	8	4	4	~200 (7 teams)	
XIII	2017	Goyang Gymnasium	January 30, 2017	8	4	4	194 (8 teams)	
XIV	2018	Goyang Gymnasium	February 15 and 16, 2018	11	6	5	200+ (14 teams)	
XV▪︎	2018	Goyang Gymnasium	September 25 and 26, 2018					
XVI	2019	Samsan World Gymnasium	February 5 and 6, 2019					
XVII▪︎	2019	Goyang Gymnasium	September 12 and 13, 2019	7			231	
XVIII	2020	Namdong Gymnasium	January 25–27, 2020	7			202 (51 groups)	
XIX▪︎ (Note: Two special spin-off episodes (dog agility and esports competitions only) due to the COVID-19 pandemic in South Korea.)	2020	—N/a	October 1 and 2, 2020					
XX (Note: Two special spin-off "Hall of Fame" episodes, recounting the highlights from previous events, due to the COVID-19 pandemic in South Korea.)	2021	—N/a	February 11 and 12, 2021	—	—	—	—	
XXI▪︎	2022	Goyang Gymnasium	September 9–12, 2022					
XXII▪︎	2024	Goyang Gymnasium	September 16–18, 2024					

== Idol Championships sports ==
=== Athletics ===
- 50 m
- 50 m hurdles
- 60 m
- 70 m
- 70 m hurdles
- 100 m
- 100 m hurdles
- 110 m hurdles
- 4 × 50 m
- 4 x 50 m relay walk
- 4 × 100 m relay
- 200 m walk
- Long jump
- High jump
- Javelin

=== Gymnastics ===
- Aerobic gymnastics
- Rhythmic gymnastics

=== E-sports ===
- PlayerUnknown's Battlegrounds
- KartRider

=== Bowling ===
- Bowling
- Ten-pin bowling

=== Football ===
- Football
- Penalty shoot-out
- Futsal

=== Other sports ===
- Archery
- Baseball pitching
- Basketball
- Breakdancing
- Curling
- Dancesport
- Dog agility
- Equestrian – dressage
- Fencing – individual sabre
- Footvolley
- Ssireum
- Table tennis

=== Swimming ===
- 50 m freestyle

== Record holders ==
Year	Sports	Record holder	Record	Notes
2010	100 m	Jo Kwon (2AM)	12.10 s	Semi-final record
2010	100 m	Bora (Sistar)	15.70 s	
2010	100 m hurdles	Bora (Sistar)	21.51 s	
2010	Long jump	Lee Hyun (8Eight)	5.42 m	
2011	50 m freestyle	Minho (Shinee)	32.81 s	
2011	50 m freestyle	Naeun (Rainbow)	43.15 s	
2011	50 m	Dongjun (ZE:A)	6.02 s	Semi-final record. Final record is 6.19 seconds.
2011	50 m	Bora (Sistar)	7.47 s	
2011	110 m hurdles	Dongjun (ZE:A)	16.14 s	
2011	High jump	Luna (f(x))	1.43 m	She has won two consecutive years.
2011	4 X 100 m	Lee Hyun (8Eight), Sangchu (Mighty Mouth), Roh Ji-hoon, Chung Kang,	50.24 s	
2012	4 X 50 m (relay walking)	Sistar	48.53 s	
2012	4 x 100 m relay	Sistar	Four golds	Four consecutive gold medals: 2010 Idol Star Championships in Athletics, 2011 Idol Star Athletics Championships Chuseok Special, 2012 Idol Star Athletics Championships New Year Special End.
2012	100 m	Kaeun (Dal Shabet)	15.58 s	Semi-final record
2013	70 m	Lee Min-hyuk (BtoB)	7.73 s	
2013	70 m	Jisoo (Tahiti)	9.39 s	Semi-final record. Final record is 9.49 seconds.
2014	60 m	Minhyuk (BtoB)	6.40 s	He placed third in world indoor record for 60 metres sprint. He holds three golds and a silver medal.
2014	High jump	Minhyuk (BtoB)	1.85 m	He broke the previous record held by Niel of Teen Top with a distance of 1.74 m.
2014	60 m	Kaeun (Dal Shabet)	7.68 s	
2016	Futsal	Doojoon, Yoseob and Gikwang (Beast)	Three golds, three silvers	Gold: 2013 Idol Star Athletics Championships Chuseok Special, 2014 Idol Star Athletics Championships New Year Special and 2015 Idol Star Athletics Championships Chuseok Special. Silver: 2015 Idol Star Athletics Championships New Year Special, 2016 Idol Star Athletics Championships New Year Special and 2016 Idol Star Athletics Championships Chuseok Special.
2017	4 x 100 m relay	BTS	Three golds, one silver	Three consecutive gold medals: 2015 Idol Star Athletics Championships Chuseok Special, 2016 S Idol Star Athletics Championships New Year Special and 2016 Idol Star Athletics Championships Chuseok Special. Silver: 2017 Idol Star Athletics Championships New Year Special
2017	Team aerobic gymnastics	Astro	19.10/20.00 points	Seventeen were tied for 19.10 in the male aerobic dance. However, the judges took an extra look into the execution of both performances and it was Astro who ultimately took first place with 9.45 points against Seventeen's 9.30 points.
2018	Team bowling	Ken and Ravi (VIXX)	191/300 points	Semi-final record. The final record was 187/300.
2018	Footvolley	JC Foot Volleyball King	15–9, 13–15, 15–9	Against Real Ballad Team
2019	4 × 100 m relay	Astro	57.12 s	
2019	4 × 100 m relay	Iz One	1:08.97	
2019	Team archery	Seventeen	95/100 points	Seventeen also scored 92/100 points in the semi-finals.
2019	Team archery	Sejeong, Mina and Hana (Gugudan)	91/100 points (final)	
2019	Penalty shoot-out	JinJin, MJ and Moon Bin (Astro)	3–2	
2019	Bowling	Sejeong and Mina (Gugudan)	155/300 points	
2019	Bowling	Jaehyun (NCT)	243/300 points	Semi-final record. He scored six strikes in a row in the semi-final round.
2019	Rhythmic gymnastics	Rachel (April)	13.20/20.00 points (juggling club)	She broke the previous record held by Cheng Xiao of Cosmic Girls with 13.00/20.00 points. She has won for two consecutive years.
2020	eSports	United Team (Wanna One)	Four golds, two silvers	eSports Soccer Tournament (Team): Gold (Kim Jaehwan & Ha Sungwoon) PUBG Practice Solo: Gold (Park Jihoon); PUBG Solo: Gold (Ha Sungwoon); PUBG Solo: Silver (Park Jihoon); PUBG Squad: Gold (Ha Sungwoon, Kim Jaehwan, Lee Daehwi, Park Jihoon) United Team swept the eSports event by winning all the gold medals.
2020	Penalty Shootout	United Team (Wanna One)	Four golds, two silvers	Penalty Shootout: Silver (Kim Jaehwan & Ha Sungwoon with Special Participation of Jeong Sewoon as their 3rd Member/Goalkeeper) The Penalty Shootout Finals against SF9 went up until the 7th Round.

== Achievements by artists ==
=== Most valuable player ===
Year	Name	Group	Achievement			Ref.
Year	Name	Group	Gold	Silver	Bronze	Ref.
2010	Bora	Sistar	3	1	0	
2010	Jo Kwon	2AM	2	0	0	
2011	Minho	Shinee	3	0	0	
2011	Dongjun	ZE:A	2	0	0	
2013	Minhyuk	BtoB	2	0	1	
2013	Hoya	Infinite	1	2	0	
2014	Minhyuk	BtoB	3	1	0	
2015	Minhyuk	BtoB	1	2	1	
2015	BTS		2	0	0	
2016	Solji	EXID	2	0	0	
2017	Astro		1	1	0	

=== Overall winner ===
Year	Team	Player	Achievement			Ref.
Year	Team	Player	Gold	Silver	Bronze	Ref.
2010	O	Super Junior, Shinee, TraxX and f(x) (SM Entertainment)	3	3	0	
2012	C F	Infinite and After School; Boyfriend and Sistar (Starship Entertainment)	2	1	1	
2013	D	4Minute, APink, Roh Ji-hoon, BtoB, F.T. Island and CNBLUE	3	1	1	
2013	A	Miss A, 2AM, Rainbow, Teen Top, 100%, B1A4, Tahiti and A-Jax	4	4	2	
2014	B	4Minute, Beast, Apink, Roh Ji-hoon, BtoB, B.A.P, MBLAQ, Pure, MAP6, C-Clown, Secret, Girl's Day, AOA, Tint	6	3	0	
2015	C	4minute, Beast, Apink, Roh Ji-hoon and BtoB (Cube Entertainment)	2	2	1	
2015	Who's the boss?	Miss A, Noel, Wonder Girls, Jeong Jinwoon, Changmin, Lee Hyun, Baek A-yeon, BTS, Bestie and Got7	2	0	0	
2016	Veterans	4Minute, Beast, Apink, Roh Ji-hoon, BtoB and CLC (Cube Entertainment)	2	0	0	
2016	B	EXID, BTS, Hur Young-ji, Melody Day, Snuper	3	1	1	

== See also ==
- Korean National Sports Festival
