= David Cho =

David Cho may refer to:

- David Yonggi Cho (born 1936), Korean Christian minister
- David Cho (director) (born 1969), South Korean producer and director
- David Cho (journalist) (born 1970s), American journalist
- David Cho (Secret Service), former head of Joe Biden's security detail

== See also ==
- David Choe, American graffiti artist
