= 2015 Idol Star Athletics Basketball Futsal Archery Championships =

- Genre: Sports; Variety show
- Directed by: Jo Wook-hyung; Kang Sung-ah
- Presented by: Park Yeon-kyung (anchor); Uhm Ji-in (reporter); Kim Sung-joo; Jun Hyun-moo; Leeteuk; Kim Jung-geun; Hwang Kwanghee
- Starring: Around 220 Idols
- Country of origin: South Korea
- Original language: Korean
- No. of episodes: 2

Production
- Production locations: Goyang Gymnasium; Jungangro 1601, Ilsanseo-gu, Goyang, Gyeonggi-do
- Running time: Thursday, Friday at 17:55

Original release
- Network: MBC
- Release: February 19 – February 20, 2015

The 2015 Idol Star Athletics Basketball Futsal Archery Championships (Korean: 아이돌스타 육상 농구 풋살 양궁 선수권대회) was held at Goyang Gymnasium in Goyang, South Korea on February 1 and 2, 2015 and was broadcast on MBC on February 19 and 20, 2015. At the championships, a total number of 9 events (6 in athletics and in archery, futsal, basketball 1 each) were contested: 5 by men and 4 by women. There were around 200 K-pop singers and celebrities who participated, divided into 19 teams.

== Cast ==
=== Main ===
- Members of male K-pop groups:
  - Super Junior, 2PM, 2AM, Beast, Shinee, Infinite, B1A4, BTS, Exo, VIXX, Got7, BtoB, Block B, Boyfriend, Teen Top, ZE:A, Tasty, ToppDogg, A-JAX, UNIQ, C-Clow, MYNAME
- Members of female K-pop groups:
  - 4Minute, Kara, Sistar, Nine Muses, Girl's Day, Rainbow, AOA, Apink, Bestie, EXID, Sunmi, Lovelyz, GFriend, Wassup

== Results ==
=== Men ===
Athletics

Event	Gold	Silver	Bronze
60 m (24 contestants)	Team S2; Kim Dong-jun (ZE:A)	Team T2; Changbum (100%)	Team "Outside Masters"; Feeldog (Big Star)
4 × 100 m	Team T2; C.A.P (Teen Top); Changjo (Teen Top); Ricky (Teen Top); Changbum (100%)	Team J1; Jo Kwon (2AM); Chansung (2PM); Mark (Got7); Junior (Got7)	Team C Eunkwang (BtoB); Minhyuk (BtoB); Changsub (BtoB); Ilhoon (BtoB)
High jump (18 contestants)	Team C Minhyuk (BtoB)	Team T2; Niel (Teen Top)	Team "I Am New"; Jota (Madtown); Team "Outside Masters"; Sihyoung (History)

Futsal

Event	Gold	Silver	Bronze
Futsal	FC Cheongdam	Goaldae-Sliga	

Basketball

Event	Gold	Silver	Bronze
Basketball	Gangnam Lakers	Maniken-Jordan	

=== Women ===
Athletics

Event	Gold	Silver	Bronze
60 m (24 contestants)	Team H Gaeun (Dal Shabet)	Team "Outside Masters"; Jisoo (Tahiti)	Team D1; Goo Hara (Kara)
4 × 100 m	Team S3; Hyolyn (Sistar); Bora (Sistar); Soyou (Sistar); Dasom (Sistar)	Team A Chorong (Apink); Bomi (Apink); Namjoo (Apink); Hayoung (Apink)	Team H Gaeun (Dal Shabet); Serri (Dal Shabet); Jiyul (Dal Shabet); Woohee (Dal Shabet)
High jump (17 contestants)	Team S1; Luna (f(x))	Team "Outside Masters"; NS Yoonji	Team D1; Heo Young-ji (Kara)

Archery

Event	Gold	Silver	Bronze
Women's team	Team C Jihyun (4Minute); Jiyoon (4Minute); Sohyun (4Minute)	Team S3; Dasom (Sistar); Soyou (Sistar); Bora (Sistar)	

== Ratings ==
Episode #	Original broadcast date	TNmS Ratings		AGB Nielsen Ratings	
Episode #	Original broadcast date	Nationwide	Seoul National Capital Area	Nationwide	Seoul National Capital Area
1	February 19, 2015	%	%	8.5%	9.5%
2	February 20, 2015	%	%	9.3%	10.3%
