= Darryl Volpicelli =

American law enforcement officer (born 1970s)

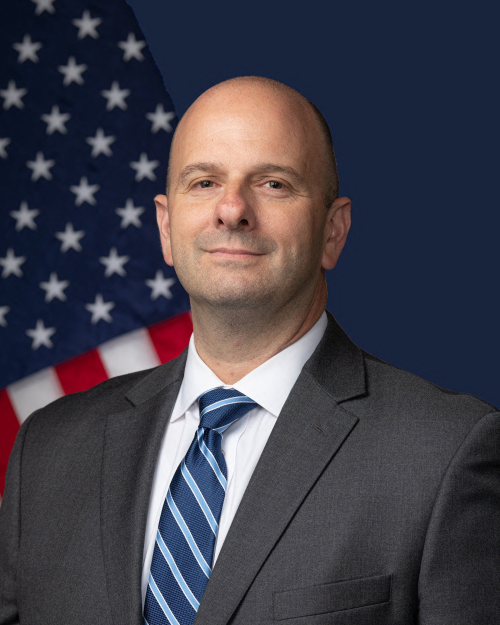
- Official portrait, 2025

Deputy Director of the United States Secret Service
- Acting
- In office October 24, 2024 – May 18, 2025
- President: Joe Biden; Donald Trump
- Preceded by: Ronald L. Rowe Jr.
- Succeeded by: Matthew C. Quinn

Assistant Director of the United States Secret Service Office of Intergovernmental and Legislative
- Incumbent
- Assumed office October 2024
- President: Joe Biden; Donald Trump
- Preceded by: Vince Tutoni

Personal details
- Born: 1976 (age 49–50) Groton, New York, U.S.
- Education: Bucknell University (BA)

Darryl S. Volpicelli (born 1976) is an American government executive who served as the acting Deputy Director of the U.S. Secret Service and is currently the Assistant Director of the U.S. Secret Service Office of Intergovernmental and Legislative Affairs. He was formerly a Secret Service Agent.

== Personal life and education ==
Volpicelli is a native of the town of Groton in the Finger Lakes region of central New York State. His parents were Ed (Edward Joseph) and Vicky M. Volpicelli. In 1993 he was the winner in the Empire State Games in discus. He graduated from Groton High School in 1994. In 1998, he earned his bachelor’s degree in political science and sociology from Bucknell University in Lewisburg, Pennsylvania. He is married to Janine Volpicelli. In 2018, he also received a professional certificate in executive leadership from American University’s eight-day Key Executive Leadership Program.

== Career ==
Volpicelli joined the Secret Service in 2000 as a member of the New York Field Office. While there, he and his wife lived in Nutley, New Jersey. He later moved to South Florida, living in Boca Raton, where he became the Deputy Special Agent in Charge of the Miami Field Office, where, inter alia, he coordinated security at Mar-a-Lago resort during President Trump's first term. In that role he also oversaw all investigative and protective operations throughout South America, Central America, and the Caribbean.

Volpicelli was then moved to Washington, D.C., where he joined the Presidential Protective Division. In 2021 he received his career SES (Senior Executive Service) appointment in the United States federal civil service. In December 2021 following the departure of Special Agent in Charge David Cho he took over as acting chief of President Joe Biden’s security detail. In 2022 and 2023 he was the Special Agent in Charge (SAIC) of the Presidential Protective Division, and the primary Secret Service representative to senior White House officials and the First Family. In that role he oversaw security and accompanied President Biden on his rail trip to Kyiv, Ukraine in 2023.

In 2023, he was appointed Deputy Assistant Director, Office of Intergovernmental & Legislative Affairs of the U.S. Secret Service, and later promoted to Assistant Director, Office of Intergovernmental & Legislative Affairs of the U.S. Secret Service in October 2024. On October 24, 2024, Volpicelli assumed the role of Acting Deputy Director of the U.S. Secret Service. His position was confirmed on January 27, 2025 and was later replaced on May 18, 2025. In his role at the Office of Intergovernmental & Legislative Affairs, he leads the Secret Service's Congressional Affairs Program, Homeland Security Program, Liaison Division, Freedom of Information Office, and Privacy Office.
