= Park Ji-yeon filmography =

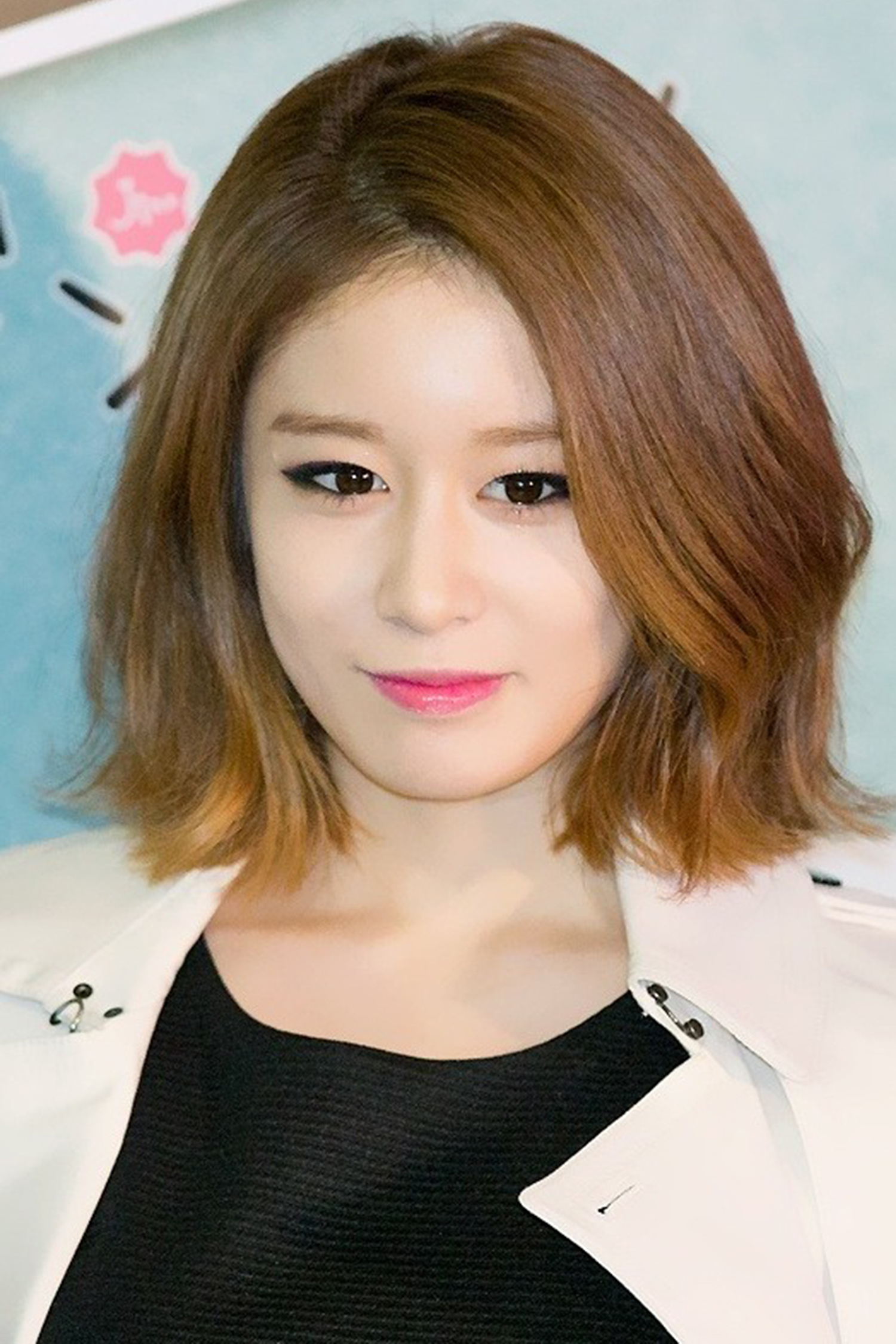
- Park in 2013
- Film: 8
- Television series: 14
- Web series: 4
- Television show: 28
- Hosting: 15
- Music videos: 9
- Theatre: 1

Park Ji-yeon (known mononymously as Jiyeon), is a South Korean singer and actress. She is a member of girl group T-ara and its subgroup T-ara N4.

Park has starred in multiple Korean and international movies and television series since 2007. In 2007, Park starred in Lobbyist. The following year, she starred in Ae-ja and Min-ja. On May 22, 2009, it was announced that Jiyeon would make her film debut with a supporting role in Gas Station 2. However, on June 22, her label, CCM, confirmed that she had withdrawn from the project due to scheduling conflicts.

== Film ==
Year	Title	Role	Notes	Ref.
2010	Death Bell 2: Bloody Camp	Lee Se-hee		
2011	Jungle Fish 2: The Movie	Seo-yul		
2011	Gnomeo & Juliet	Juliet	Voice-dubbed	
2011	Up To The Sky	Ji-yeon	Parody film	
2011	Ghastly	—N/a	Cameo	
2015	Encounter	—N/a	Unreleased Chinese film	
2023	Gangnam Zombie	Min-jeong		
2024	The Fire Woman	Lee Soo-yeon		

== Television series ==
Year	Title	Role	Notes	Ref.
2007	Hello! Miss	Student	Cameo	
2007	Lobbyist	Deaf daughter's friend	Cameo	
2007	Couple Court: Love and War	protagonist's daughter		
2008	Aeja's Older Sister, Minja	Maeng Na-yeon		
2009	Soul	Yoon Doo-na		
2009	High Kick Through the Roof	Lee Yu-ri	Cameo	
2010	Master of Study	Na Hyun-jung		
2010	Jungle Fish 2	Seo-yul		
2011	Miss Ripley	Yu	Cameo	
2012	The Thousandth Man	Han Yi-seul	Cameo	
2012	Dream High 2	Ri-an / Lee Ji-kyung		
2014	Triangle	Seong Yoo-jin		
2019	I Wanna Hear Your Song	Ha Eun-joo		
2021	Imitation	La Ri-ma		

== Web series ==
Year	Title	Role	Ref.
2010	Bubi Bubi	Herself	
2015	Sweet Temptation	Ji-ho	
2016	My Runway	Han Seo-yeon	
2021	Next Door Witch J	Seo Je-yi	

== Television shows ==
Year	Title	Role	Notes	Ref.
2009	M Countdown	Special host	K-Chart announcer	
2009–10	Star King	Recurring guest		
2010	M Countdown	Special host	with Hyomin	
2010	M Countdown	Special host	Episode 951	
2010	Star Idol Couple Battle	Contestant	Special Program	
2010–11	Heroes	Main cast		
2010–11	Music Core	Host		
2011	Idol Health Beauty Contest	Main cast	Lunar New Year special show	
2011	Inkigayo	Special host		
2012	Crisis Escape No. 1	Special host	Episode 319	
2012	Music Core	Special host		
2012	Crisis Escape No. 1	Special host	with Hahm Eun-jung	
2012	2012 Idol Star Olympics Championships	Contestant	Received Gold medal Table Tennis	
2013–14	The Show: All About K-pop	Host		
2013	Hidden Singer 2	Special Judge		
2014	M Countdown	Special host		
2014–15	The Show	Host		
2016	M!Countdown	Special host	with Hahm Eun-jung	
2017	Living Together in Empty Room	Cast	with Oh Chang-seok (Episode 16–19)	
2017	The Show	Special host	Episode 121	
2018	Video Star	Special host		
2018	Jiyeon's Awkward Chinese	Host		
2021	Beauty Time 3	Host	with Park Cho-a and Yerin	
2021	Extreme Debut: Wild Idol	Mentor	Episode 1	
2021	What's In My Bag? 4	Recurring Guest		
2022	Secret Men & Women	Host		
2022	The Latest Beauty Trends	Host	with Yerin and Lee Chaeyeon	
2022–2026	What's In My Bag? 5	Recurring Guest	Episodes 1, 3, 20–23	
2024	Come On Style	Host	with Uhm Jung-hwa	

== Music videos ==
Year	Song	Artist	Album	Ref.
2008	Never Ending Story	SMASH	Open Fire!	
2009	Cry Baby	SG Wannabe	Gift from SG Wannabe	
2009	I Love You	SG Wannabe	Gift from SG Wannabe	
2009	Ghost (Ver.1)	Yangpa	Soul OST	
2009	Ghost (Ver.2)	Yangpa	Soul OST	
2010	Must Let You Go	Young Gun	Non-album single	
2011	Shake If Up	Seo In-guk	Non-album single	
2014	More And More	The SeeYa	Non-album single	

== Hosting ==
Year	Event	Country	Notes	Ref.
2009	KBS Joy 3rd Anniversary Concert	South Korea		
2012	M Countdown Special Concert	Thailand		
2012	Ulsan Summer Festival	Thailand	London Olympics Special	
2013	MBC Korean Music Wave	Thailand	with Nichkhun, Choi Min-ho, Jo Kwon, and Bae Suzy	
2013	M Countdown Special Concert	Thailand		
2014	SBS Awards Festival	South Korea	with Hahm Eun-jung	
2014	World-Vision Sharing Concert	South Korea		
2014	K-Pop Winter Festival	South Korea		
2015	One Asia Seoul Mega Concert	South Korea		
2015	Asia Cultural Festival	South Korea		
2015	Kpop Summer Festival	South Korea	with Zhou Mi	
2016	M!Countdown special concert	China	with Hahm Eun-jung	
2017	Incheon Kpop Concert	South Korea		
2017	DIA's "YOLO Trip" Press Conference	South Korea	with Hyomin	
2020	MMTG Special Concert	South Korea		
