= 2014 Idol Star Athletics Championships =

The 2014 Idol Star Athletics Championships (Korean: 아이돌스타 육상 양궁 풋살 컬링 선수권대회) was held at Jamsil Arena in Seoul, South Korea on January 7, 2014, and was broadcast on MBC on January 9 and 10, 2014. At the championships, a total number of 10 events (6 in athletics, 2 in archery and in curling, futsal 1 each) were contested: 5 by men and 5 by women. There were over 230 K-pop singers and celebrities who participated, divided into 8 teams.

== Results ==
=== Men ===
Athletics

Event	Gold	Silver	Bronze
60 m	Team B Minhyuk (BtoB)	Team D Sanghoon (100%)	Team D Baro (B1A4)
4 × 100 m	Team A Daeryong (Tasty); Soryong (Tasty); Woohyun (Infinite); Hoya (Infinite)	Team B Daehyun (B.A.P); Youngjae (B.A.P); Zelo (B.A.P); Jong-up (B.A.P)	Team C Hong-bin (VIXX); Hyuk (VIXX); Ken (VIXX); Ravi (VIXX)
High jump	Team B Minhyuk (BtoB)	Team C Sunghak (Big Star)	Team D Sanghoon (100%)

Archery

Event	Gold	Silver	Bronze
Men's team	Team B Cheondung (MBLAQ)	Team D CNU (B1A4)	Team C Hyeong-kon (A-JAX)

Football

Event	Gold	Silver	Bronze
Futsal	Team B	Team D	Team C

=== Women ===
Athletics

Event	Gold	Silver	Bronze
60 m	Team A Gaeun (Dal Shabet)	Team D Jisoo (Tahiti)	Team A SuJin (Wassup)
4 × 100 m	Team B Bomi (Apink); Hayoung (Apink); Naeun (Apink); Namjoo (Apink)	Team A Kaeun (After School); Lizzy (After School); Raina (After School); Lime (Hello Venus)	Team C Woori (Rainbow); Jisook (Rainbow); Noeul (Rainbow); Hyunyoung (Rainbow)

Archery

Event	Gold	Silver	Bronze
Women's team	Team B So-hyun (4Minute)	Team D Bora (Sistar)	Team C Jae-kyung (Rainbow)

Curling

Event	Gold	Silver	Bronze
Women's team	Team C LPG	Team B Girl's Day	Team A Dal Shabet; Team C Nine Muses

=== Mixed ===
Event	Gold	Silver	Bronze
4 × 100 m	Team A Jooyeon (After School); Woohyun (Infinite); Gaeun (Dal Shabet); Hoya (Infinite)	Team B Hyoseong (Secret); Minhyuk (BtoB); Naeun (Apink); Daehyun (B.A.P)	Team D RiSe (Ladies' Code); Chunji (Teen Top); Jisoo (Tahiti); Gongchan (B1A4)

== Ratings ==
Episode #	Original broadcast date	TNmS Ratings		AGB Nielsen Ratings	
Episode #	Original broadcast date	Nationwide	Seoul National Capital Area	Nationwide	Seoul National Capital Area
1	January 30, 2014	%	%	%	8.4%
2	January 31, 2014	%	%	6.9%	7.8%
