= Oh Sang-jin =

South Korean television presenter and actor

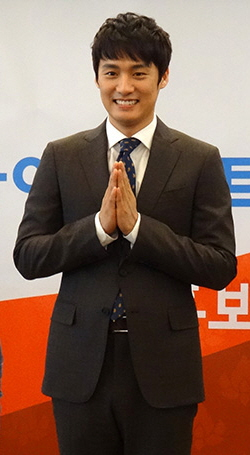
- Oh in 2013
- Born: February 15, 1980 (age 46); Ulsan, South Korea
- Education: Yonsei University - Commerce and Economics
- Occupations: News anchor; television personality; actor
- Years active: 2006–present
- Agent: IOK Company
- Spouse: Kim So-young (m. 2017)
- Children: 2

Korean name
- Hangul: 오상진
- Hanja: 吳尚津
- RR: O Sangjin
- MR: O Sangjin

Oh Sang-jin (Korean: 오상진; born February 15, 1980) is a South Korean former news anchor, television personality, and actor.

== Career ==
He joined MBC in 2006, and became one of the network's most popular news anchors and TV show hosts. A member of the reporters' union, Oh was an outspoken critic of MBC's management, which he claimed compromised journalistic independence by keeping close ties with the Lee Myung-bak government. When Oh took part in the broadcasters' strike of 2012, MBC removed him from all its news and entertainment programs for the rest of that year, and he resigned from the network in 2013. Now a freelancer, Oh continued his television and hosting career. He also began acting, with roles in the television dramas My Love from the Star, Sweden Laundry and The Family Is Coming.

In February 2017 it was announced that Oh joined YG Entertainment.

In April 2019, Oh left YG Entertainment and signed with new agency IOK Company.

== Personal life ==
Oh and his wife welcomed their first child, a daughter, in 2019. On September 18, 2023, the couple announced their second pregnancy, but miscarried a month later. The couple welcomed a son on April 3, 2026.

== Filmography ==
=== Film ===
| Year | Title | Role | Notes | Ref. |
|---|---|---|---|---|
| 2012 | The Traffickers | Police station reporter | Cameo | |
| 2014 | Venus Talk | MC at Hwang Hyun-seung's shoot | Cameo | |

=== Television show ===
| Year | Title | Role | Notes | Ref. |
|---|---|---|---|---|
| 2006 | Morning Show! with Choi Yoon-young and Four Men | MC | | |
| 2006 | Topics On Focus Live | MC | | |
| 2006 | Search King | MC | | |
| 2006–2007 | Learn Word | MC | | |
| 2006–2012 | Complaint Zero | MC | | |
| 2007–2012 | Find! Delicious TV | MC | | |
| 2007–2008 | Let's Play Economy | MC | | |
| 2007–2009 | Fantasy Couple | MC | | |
| 2008–2009 | Never Ending Story | MC | | |
| 2009 | Star Secrets | MC | | |
| 2010 | Star Dance Battle | MC | | |
| 2010 | Show! Music Core | MC | | |
| 2010 | Real Match! National Athlete High Kick | MC | | |
| 2010 | Youth Alkkagi Competition | MC | | |
| 2010 | Quiz Show Rainbow | MC | | |
| 2010–2011 | Miracle | MC | | |
| 2011 | New Recruit | MC | | |
| 2011 | Minute to Win It | MC | | |
| 2011 | Dancing with the Stars | Contestant | | |
| 2011 | Seoul Metropolitan Youth Orchestra: Summer Classics | Narration | | |
| 2011 | Idol Star Athletics Championships | Commentator | | |
| 2011–2012 | Star Audition: Birth of a Great Star | MC | Season 2 | |
| 2011 | Girls' Generation’s Christmas Fairy Tale | MC | | |
| 2012 | Idol Star Athletics-Swimming Championships | Commentator | | |
| 2013 | Absolute Man | MC | Season 3 | |
| 2013 | Miss Korea's Secret Garden | MC | | |
| 2013 | Dancing 9 | MC | | |
| 2013 | Campus Debate Battle | MC | Season 4 | |
| 2013 | The Grand Battle of Hansik | MC | | |
| 2014 | Dancing 9 | MC | Season 2 | |
| 2014 | Always Cantare | MC | | |
| 2017 | Freestyle Rankers 19 | MC | | |
| 2018 | The Return of Superman | Narrator | | |
| 2019 | Seoul Mate 3 | Cast | | |
| 2021 | Free Doctor | Main Host | With Lee Ji-hye and Kim So-young | |
| 2022 | Same Bed, Different Dreams 2: You Are My Destiny | Cast | | |
| 2023 | Neighborhood Cool House | MC | With Kim Ji-eun | |

=== Television series ===
| Year | Title | Role | Notes | Ref. |
|---|---|---|---|---|
| 1995 | West Palace | | | |
| 1996 | LA Arirang | | | |
| 1999 | Love in 3 Colors | | | |
| 2008 | Kokkiri (Elephant) | | cameo (episode 73) | |
| 2008–2009 | Here He Comes | Oh Sang-jin | | |
| 2010 | High Kick Through the Roof | Park Ji-sung | Cameo (episode 107) | |
| 2011 | The Greatest Love | Music program MC | Cameo (episode 1) | |
| 2013 | Drama Festival: "Boy Meets Girl" | | Camep | |
| 2013–2014 | My Love from the Star | Yoo Seok | | |
| 2014 | Big Man | News anchor | | |
| 2014–2015 | Sweden Laundry | Kim Eun-chul | | |
| 2014 | Drama Festival: "The Diary of a Resentful Woman" | Magistrate | | |
| 2015 | The Family is Coming | Jung Joon-ah | | |
| 2015 | Persevere, Goo Hae-ra | Show MC Oh Sang-jin | | |
| 2015 | KBS Drama Special: "What Do Ghosts Do?" | Seo Joon-hyuk | | |
| 2017 | Children of the 20th Century | Kang Kyung-suk | | |

=== Web series ===
| Year | Title | Role | Notes | Ref. |
|---|---|---|---|---|
| 2020 | How Are U Bread | program host | Cameo | |

=== Radio shows ===
| Year | Title | Role | Notes | Ref. |
|---|---|---|---|---|
| 2009–2011 | Good Morning FM with Oh Sang-jin | DJ | | |

=== Hosting ===
| Year | Title | Notes | Ref. |
|---|---|---|---|
| 2008 | 26th MBC Creative Children's Song Festival | | |
| 2008 | 7th Korean Film Awards | | |
| 2009 | 1st Incheon Korean Music Wave | | |
| 2010 | 2nd Incheon Korean Music Wave | | |
| 2011 | 3rd Incheon Korean Music Wave | | |
| 2013 | 49th Baeksang Arts Awards | with Joo Won and Kim Ah-joong | |
| 2013 | 6th Korea Drama Awards | | |
| 2013 | Herald-Donga TV Lifestyle Awards | | |
| 2014 | 28th Golden Disk Awards | | |
| 2014 | 3rd Gaon Chart K-Pop Awards | | |
| 2014 | Miss Korea Pageant | | |
| 2017 | 2017 MBC Drama Awards | with Kim Sung-ryung | |

== Ambassadorship ==
- Ambassador of Public Relations to Seoul (2023)

== Awards and nominations ==
| Year | Award | Category | Nominated work | Result |
|---|---|---|---|---|
| 2006 | MBC Entertainment Awards | Best Male Newcomer in a Variety Show | | Won |
| 2007 | MBC Entertainment Awards | Best Announcer | | Won |
| 2007 | Andre Kim Best Star Awards | Recipient | —N/a | Won |
| 2007 | Korea Best Dressed Awards | Best Dressed, Broadcasting category | —N/a | Won |
| 2009 | MBC Drama Awards | Special Award, TV Announcer category | | Won |
| 2009 | Commendation from the Secretary of the Ministry of Health and Welfare | Recipient | —N/a | Won |
| 2011 | MBC Entertainment Awards | Special Award, News/Current Affairs category | Complaint Zero | Won |
