= Incheon Korean Music Wave =

South Korean annual music festival

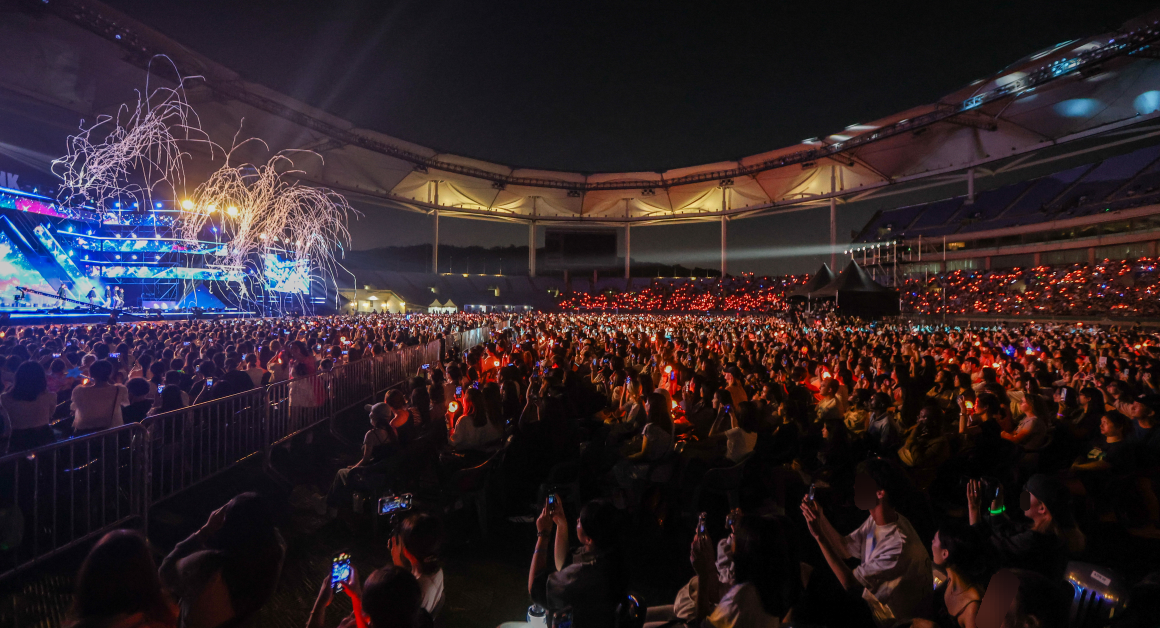
- In September 2024
- Genre: Pop music, K-pop, rock music
- Locations: Incheon, South Korea
- Years active: 2009–present

The Incheon Korean Music Wave is an annual music festival held at the Incheon Munhak Stadium in Incheon, South Korea and broadcast on MBC. The event is organized by HH Company and features South Korea's top artists.

== History ==
The first festival was held at the Incheon Munhak Stadium on September 5, 2009. The event was organized to commemorate the Visit Incheon 2009 campaign and was also part of the Global Fair & Festival Incheon 2009 event calendar. The concert was originally scheduled to take place on August 22, but due to the death of former South Korean president, Kim Dae-jung, it was moved to September 5.

== Festivals ==
=== 2009 ===
- Date: September 5, 2009
- Hosts: Tiffany and Yuri of Girls' Generation, Oh Sang-jin
- Performers: Girls' Generation, Kara, Shinee, Super Junior, Rain, M, 2PM, F.T. Island, Brown Eyed Girls, Jewelry, Baek Jiyoung, Younha, Lee Jung-hyun, Chae Yeon

=== 2010 ===
- Date: August 29, 2010
- Hosts: Tiffany and Yuri of Girls' Generation, Oh Sang-jin
- Performers: BoA, SE7EN, Super Junior, Taeyang, 2PM, Girls' Generation, Kara, Son Dambi, SHINee, Brown Eyed Girls, SG Wannabe, F.T. Island, After School, CNBLUE, Supernova, U-KISS, 4Minute, BEAST, MBLAQ, SECRET

=== 2011 ===
- Date: August 13, 2011
- Hosts: Tiffany and Yuri of Girls' Generation, Oh Sang-jin
- Performers: Super Junior, Girls' Generation, 2PM, 2NE1, BEAST, Kara, SHINee, 2AM, f(x), miss A, T-ara, MBLAQ, F.T. Island, 4Minute, SECRET, SISTAR, Infinite, Teen Top, ZE:A

=== 2012 ===
The event was cancelled due to expenses. HH Company, the event's organizer, posted an apology on the event's official website and issued refunds.

=== 2013 ===
- Date: September 1, 2013
- Hosts: Tiffany and Yuri of Girls' Generation
- Performers: Super Junior, Girls' Generation, BEAST, SISTAR, Kara, MBLAQ, miss A, Teen Top, 2AM, ZE:A, SECRET, EXO, B.A.P, Rainbow, Boyfriend, T-ara, BTOB, A-JAX, BTS, Girl's Day, F.T. Island

== See also ==
- List of music festivals in South Korea
- List of pop festivals
