= Dae-hyun =

- Hangul: 대현
- RR: Daehyeon
- MR: Taehyŏn

Dae-hyun is a Korean given name.

People with this name include:

- An Dae-hyun (born 1962), South Korean Greco-Roman wrestler
- Daniel Dae Kim (born Kim Dae-hyun, 1968), American actor
- David Cho (journalist) (born David Dae-Hyun Cho), American journalist
- Chong Tae-hyon (born 1978), South Korean baseball player
- Yoo Dae-hyun (born 1990), South Korean football player
- Jung Dae-hyun (born 1993), South Korean singer, member of boy band B.A.P
- Jang Dae-hyeon (born 1997), South Korean singer, member of boy band WEi

== See also ==
- List of Korean given names
