= 2013 Idol Star Athletics – Archery Championships =

The 2013 Idol Star Athletics – Archery Championship (Korean: 아이돌 스타 육상 양궁 선수권 대회) was held at Goyang Gymnasium in Goyang, South Korea on January 28, 2013 and was broadcast on MBC on February 11, 2013 (a small part was broadcast on February 20, 2013). At the championships a total number of 8 events in athletics and 2 events in archery were contested: 5 by men, 4 by women and 1 mixed. There were a total number of 150 participating K-pop singers and celebrities, divided into 10 teams.

== Results ==
=== Men ===
Athletics

Event	Gold	Silver	Bronze
70 m	Team D Minhyuk (BtoB)	Team G Hoya (Infinite)	Team J Feel Dog (Big Star)
70 m hurdles	Team D Minhyuk (BtoB)	Team C Dongjun (ZE:A)	Team B Simon (DMTN)
4 X 100 m	Team F Ricky (Teen Top); Chunji (Teen Top); C.A.P (Teen Top); Changjo (Teen Top)	Team G Sungyeol (Infinite); Dongwoo (Infinite); Woohyun (Infinite); Hoya (Infinite)	Team C Ha Minwoo (ZE:A); Jung Heechul (ZE:A); Park Hyungsik (ZE:A); Kim Dongjun (ZE:A)
High jump	Team F Niel (Teen Top)	Team A Tao (Exo)	Team F Ricky (Teen Top); Team D Minhyuk (BtoB)

Archery

Event	Gold	Silver	Bronze
Men's team	Team C Kevin (ZE:A); Park Hyung Sik (ZE:A); Kim Dong Jun (ZE:A)	Team E Mir (MBLAQ); Cheondoong (MBLAQ); G.O (MBLAQ)	Team H Yongguk (B.A.P); Zelo (B.A.P); Himchan (B.A.P)

=== Women ===
Athletics

Event	Gold	Silver	Bronze
70 m	Team J Jisoo (Tahiti)	Team C Eunji (Nine Muses)	Team E Gaeun (Dal Shabet)
4 X 100 m	Team E Gaeun (Dal Shabet); Jiyul (Dal Shabet); Woohee (Dal Shabet); Serri (Dal Shabet)	Team G Kaeun (After School); Nara (Hello Venus); Lizzy (After School); Alice (Hello Venus)	Team C Hyemi (Nine Muses); Minha (Nine Muses); Kyungri (Nine Muses); Eunji (Nine Muses)
High jump	Team A Minah (Girl's Day)	Team B Bora (Sistar)	Team F Woori (Rainbow)

Archery

Event	Gold	Silver	Bronze
Women's team	Team B Bora (Sistar); Dasom (Sistar); Soyou (Sistar)	Team D Jihyun (4minute); Gayoon (4minute); Sohyun (4minute)	Team G Jungah (After School); Raina (After School); E-Young (After School)

=== Mixed ===
Athletics

Event	Gold	Silver	Bronze
4 X 100 m	Team B Hyolyn (Sistar); Donghyun (Boyfriend); Soyou (Sistar); Simon (DMTN)	Team C Eunji (Nine Muses); Ha Min Woo (ZE:A); Kyungri (Nine Muses); Kim Dong Jun (ZE:A)	Team E Gaeun (Dal Shabet); Changmin (2AM); Serri (Dal Shabet); G.O (MBLAQ)

== Ratings ==
Episode #	Original broadcast date	TNmS Ratings		AGB Nielsen Ratings	
Episode #	Original broadcast date	Nationwide	Seoul National Capital Area	Nationwide	Seoul National Capital Area
1	February 11, 2013	9.6%	10.9%	8.6%	9.5%
