= Seoul Mate =

South Korean television show

- Logo for Seoul Mate 3
- Hangul: 서울메이트
- RR: Seoul meiteu
- MR: Sŏul meit'ŭ
- Genre: Reality
- Starring: see 'Cast Member'
- Country of origin: South Korea
- Original language: Korean
- No. of seasons: 3
- No. of episodes: 69

Production
- Production location: South Korea
- Running time: 80 minutes

Original release
- Network: tvN
- Release: November 17, 2017 – September 16, 2019

Seoul Mate (Korean: 서울메이트) is a South Korean reality program on tvN

Season 1 was televised on tvN and O'live Mondays at 8:10 pm (KST) starting November 17, 2017 and ended on August 25, 2018.

Season 2 was televised on tvN Mondays at 8:10 pm (KST) starting December 10, 2018 and ended on March 25, 2019.

Season 3 is televised on tvN Mondays at 8:10 pm (KST) starting July 1, 2019.

== Synopsis ==
This is a show where non-Koreans who loves or interested in visiting South Korea can apply to join the programme. In the programme, the selected few participants gets to stay in a Korean celebrity house who will be their host for the next 2 to 3 days.

== Cast member ==
Season	Name	Ref.
1	Kim Joon-ho, Kim Sook, Jang Seo-hee, Lee Ki-woo, Goo Hara, Andy Lee, Lee Yi-kyung, Soyou, Seo Hyo-rim, Jinwoon	
2	Kim Joon-ho, Kim Sook, Key (Shinee), Hong Soo-hyun	
3	Oh Sang-jin, Kim So-young, Lee Kyu-han, Boom, Yura (Girl's Day), Kim Joon-ho (Ep 10 – 12)	

== Ratings ==
- Ratings listed below are the individual corner ratings of Seoul Mate. (Note: Individual corner ratings do not include commercial time, which regular ratings include.)
- In the ratings below, the highest rating for the show will be in red and the lowest rating for the show will be in blue each year.

=== Season 1 ===
List of ratings

2017–2018		AGB Nielsen Ratings (Nationwide)
Ep. #	Original Airdate	AGB Nielsen Ratings (Nationwide)
1	November 11, 2017	2.068%
2	November 18, 2017	2.212%
3	November 25, 2017	—N/a
4	December 2, 2017	1.528%
5	December 9, 2017	—N/a
6	December 16, 2017	—N/a
7	December 23, 2017	—N/a
8	December 30, 2017	2.702%
9	January 6, 2018	2.150%
10	January 13, 2018	2.536%
11	January 20, 2018	3.279%
12	January 27, 2018	2.240%
13	February 3, 2018	2.407%
14	February 10, 2018	2.2%
15	February 17, 2018	1.4%
16	March 3, 2018	2.347%
17	March 10, 2018	2.408%
18	March 17, 2018	2.626%
19	March 24, 2018	2.854%
20	March 31, 2018	2.051%
21	April 7, 2018	2.084%
22	April 14, 2018	2.103%
23	April 21, 2018	1.280%
24	April 28, 2018	1.759%
25	May 5, 2018	1.276%
26	May 12, 2018	1.763%
27	May 19, 2018	1.482%
28	May 26, 2018	1.4%
29	June 2, 2018	1.430%
30	June 9, 2018	1.731%
31	June 16, 2018	1.655%
32	June 23, 2018	1.4%
33	June 30, 2018	1.815%
34	July 7, 2018	1.616%
35	July 14, 2018	1.759%
36	July 21, 2018	2.222%
37	July 28, 2018	2.039%
38	August 4, 2018	2.258%
39	August 11, 2018	2.047%
40	August 18, 2018	1.633%
41	August 25, 2018	1.657%

=== Season 2 ===
List of ratings

2018–2019		AGB Nielsen Ratings (Nationwide)
Ep. #	Original Airdate	AGB Nielsen Ratings (Nationwide)
1	December 10, 2018	2.342%
2	December 17, 2018	2.499%
3	December 24, 2018	2.492%
4	December 31, 2018	1.810%
5	January 7, 2019	2.125%
6	January 14, 2019	2.162%
7	January 21, 2019	1.792%
8	January 28, 2019	1.583%
9	February 4, 2019	1.550%
10	February 11, 2019	2.047%
11	February 18, 2019	2.363%
12	February 25, 2019	2.061%
13	March 4, 2019	2.312%
14	March 11, 2019	1.543%
15	March 18, 2019	1.428%
16	March 25, 2019	1.422%

=== Season 3 ===
List of ratings

2019–present		AGB Nielsen Ratings (Nationwide)
Ep. #	Original Airdate	AGB Nielsen Ratings (Nationwide)
1	July 1, 2019	1.883%
2	July 8, 2019	1.861%
3	July 15, 2019	1.903%
4	July 22, 2019	1.679%
5	July 29, 2019	1.500%
6	August 5, 2019	1.247%
7	August 12, 2019	1.521%
8	August 19, 2019	1.851%
9	August 26, 2019	1.498%
10	September 1, 2019	1.554%
11	September 9, 2019	1.852%
12	September 16, 2019	1.496%
