= To the Beautiful You =

2012 South Korean TV series

- Promotional poster
- Also known as: For You in Full Blossom
- Hangul: 아름다운 그대에게
- RR: Areumdaun geudaeege
- MR: Arŭmdaun kŭdaeege
- Genre: Romance; Comedy; Drama
- Based on: Hanazakari no Kimitachi e by Hisaya Nakajo
- Written by: Lee Young-chul
- Directed by: Jeon Ki-sang
- Starring: Sulli; Choi Min-ho; Lee Hyun-woo
- Opening theme: "Butterfly" by Jessica and Krystal
- Ending theme: "Stand Up" by J-Min
- Country of origin: South Korea
- Original language: Korean
- No. of episodes: 16

Production
- Running time: 60 minutes Wednesday and Thursday at 21:55 (KST)
- Production company: SM Entertainment

Original release
- Network: SBS TV
- Release: 15 August – 4 October 2012

Related
- Hanazakarino Kimitachihe; Hanazakari no Kimitachi e (2007); Hanazakari no Kimitachi e (2011)

To the Beautiful You (Korean: 아름다운 그대에게) is a 2012 South Korean television drama series starring Sulli, Choi Min-ho, and Lee Hyun-woo. It aired on SBS from August 15 to October 4, 2012, on Wednesday and Thursday at 21:55 (KST) for 16 episodes. The drama is based on the Japanese shōjo manga Hana-Kimi by Hisaya Nakajo.

== Plot ==
Goo Jae-hee (Sulli), a South Korean girl living in the United States, watches a track-and-field competition on TV one day and becomes attracted to one of the high jump athletes, Kang Tae-joon (Choi Min-ho). She begins to idolize the young athlete and is inspired to participate in sports and to stand up against her foes. She eventually transfers to Korea to attend the same school that Tae-joon, who has recently suffered an accident that could potentially end his career, goes to. However, Tae-joon attends an all-boys Genie High School, so Jae-hee cuts her hair short and disguises herself as a boy to enter the school.

== Cast ==
=== Main ===
- Sulli as Goo Jae-hee/Mizuki Ashiya, a South Korean girl who lived in the US since she was five. Jae-hee becomes lovestruck with Kang Tae-joon after witnessing him compete in a high jump event. Determined to see him jump again, she disguises as a teenage boy and transfers to the all-male Genie High School.
- Choi Min-ho as Kang Tae-joon/Izumi Sano, is a good-looking high jump athlete who holds the best record in the World Junior Championships. However, an injury ended his career. He was the second person after Jang Min-woo to learn Jae-hee is a girl by overhearing an argument between her and Daniel.
- Lee Hyun-woo as Cha Eun-gyeol, a charming soccer player who likes to joke around and possesses outstanding soccer skills. Eun-gyeol meets and falls in love with Jae-hee, causing him to doubt his sexuality.

=== Supporting ===
==== Students ====
- Seo Jun-young as Ha Seung-ri/Minami Nanba, the leader of Dormitory 2 and track team captain with strong leadership skills who later falls in love with Seol Ha-na.
- Hwang Kwang-hee as Song Jong-min/Senri Nakao, a hurdler who is friends with Eun-gyeol. Although Jong-min constantly annoys Jae-hee, he is actually a warm hearted person.
- Kang Ha-neul as Min Hyun-jae/Makoto Kagurazaka, a high jump athlete in the national team who is Tae-joon's rival and Eun-gyeol's roommate.
- Yoo Min-kyu as Jo Young-man/Megumi Tennoji, the leader of Dormitory 1 and Taekwondo department. He seems rough on the outside, but is actually passionate about helping his underclassmen.
- Kim Ian as Na Cheol-soo/Oscar Himejima, tleader of Dormitory 3, the theater and arts department.

==== Others ====
- Ki Tae-young as Jang Min-woo/Hokuto Umeda, the teacher and doctor who first realized that Jae-hee is actually a girl. However, Min-woo does not reveal this truth and takes care of her like a guardian angel.
- Kang Kyung-joon as Baek Gwang-min, the harsh and strict track-and-field coach.
- Kim Ji-won as Seol Han-na/Hibari Hanayashiki, a wealthy gymnast and a childhood friend of Tae-joon, who knows him better than anyone else. Although Han-na seems spoiled and insolent, she possesses a sincere affection for Tae-joon. Later, after sustaining ankle injuries, Han-na gives up her feelings for him and accepts Seung-ri's feelings.
- Lee Young-eun as Lee So-jung, a teacher at Genie High School.
- Lee Ah-hyun as Director Jang, the perfectionist manager of sports management agency that Tae-joon is signed to.
- Ahn Hye-kyung as Yang Seo-yoon/Kinuko Karasuma, a sports magazine reporter.
- Sunwoo Jae-duk, Kang Geun-wook/Takehiko Sano, Kang Tae-joon's wealthy father. He is cold to his son on the outside, but actually cares for him very much.
- Lee Han-wi as Hwang Gye-bong/Director Sawatari
- Julien Kang as Daniel Dawson/Shizuki Claude Ashiya, Jae-hee's caring older half-brother who works as a doctor. Although Daniel is adamant on taking Jae-hee back home after discovering what she did, he eventually relents and allows his sister to continue to study in Genie High
- Nam Ji-hyun as Hong Da-hae, an aspiring violinist and a childhood frenemy of Eun-gyeol.
- Kim Woo-bin as John Kim/Gilbert Lang, Jae-hee's childhood friend who works as a photographer and aided her in transforming into a boy to enter Genie High School. He loves Jae-hee, but ended up being the catalyst that makes Tae-joon realize that she is an important special person in his life.
- Yura as Lee Eun-yeong, one of Kang Tae-joon's fans.
- Jung Hye-sung, as Hong Bo-hee, one of Kang Tae-joon's fans.
- Song Ji-soo as Shin Myeong-hwa
- Choi Jong-yoon as Min-wook

=== Special appearances ===
- Sang-chu as muscle student
- Exo-K (Ep. 2)
- Go Soo-hee as woman at school cafeteria (Ep. 2)
- Hong Rok-gi as DJ in charge of the party (Ep. 2)
- Park Tae-sung as Chang-yeon (Ep. 3–4)
- Jung Yoo-geun as Jae-gyul (Ep. 4)
- Led Apple as Shut Up, a boyband. (Ep. 6)
- Seo Kang-joon as student on dormitory 3 (Ep. 3 & 7)

== Production ==
=== Casting ===
On March 10, 2011, SM Entertainment announced that it had acquired the rights to the manga Hana-Kimi and was filming its Korean adaptation. Representatives revealed: "The Korean version will have a total of 16 episodes that draw out stories of hopes and dreams. It's a teenage comedy with a cute, but strong storyline and a slew of handsome cast members."

On April 26, Shinee member Choi Min-ho and F(x) member Sulli were cast as lead roles. directed by Jeon Ki-sang who had previously directed My Girl and Boys Over Flowers. On May 24, 2012, the title was revealed to be To The Beautiful You and written by Lee Young-chul, who wrote the High Kick! series. On 6 June, it was announced that Infinite member L was reviewing the offer to join, but had overseas schedules with filming. After previous discussions for the secondary male lead role, Lee Hyun-woo was finally confirmed as Cha Eun-gyeol.

=== Filming ===
The first script-reading took place on June 7, 2012, at SBS Ilsan Production Center. On July 9, Choi Min-ho, Sulli, Lee Kwang-hee, members of Exo were spotted taking part in a photoshoot for the drama. While preparing for his role as Tae-joon, Choi received personal training from coach Kim Tae-young, former national high jump athlete and a member of the Korea Association of Athletics Federations, for half months. His personal record at the end of July was 175 cm.

Filming began at the beginning of July. In an interview with Vogue Girl Korea, Choi confirmed that the drama would broadcast on August 15 rather than the initially scheduled August 8. MokWon University was used to film the scenes in Genie Athletic High School, and Anmyeondo was used to film the summer vacation scenes. The first scene Choi filmed was a high jump scene. For the high jump scene, 105 high-speed cameras were used to film in bullet time.

== Ratings ==
According to AGB Nielsen Media Research, the first episode achieved a nationwide rating of 7.4 percent in viewership, behind Arang and the Magistrate on MBC with 13.3 percent for its premiere episode and 19.4 percent for Bridal Mask on KBS.

- In the table below, the blue numbers represent the lowest ratings and the red numbers represent the highest ratings.
- NR denotes that the drama did not rank in the top 20 daily programs on that date.

Episode #	Original broadcast date	Average audience share			
Episode #	Original broadcast date	TNmS Ratings		AGB Nielsen	
Episode #	Original broadcast date	Nationwide	Seoul National Capital Area	Nationwide	Seoul National Capital Area
1	August 15, 2012	6.4% (NR)	7.9% (NR)	7.3% (NR)	9.3% (NR)
2	August 16, 2012	5.8% (NR)	7.0% (NR)	5.7% (NR)	8.1% (NR)
3	August 22, 2012	4.8% (NR)	5.7% (NR)	5.1% (NR)	8.4% (NR)
4	August 23, 2012	5.9% (NR)	7.2% (NR)	5.4% (NR)	8.4% (NR)
5	August 29, 2012	4.3% (NR)	5.1% (NR)	4.8% (NR)	7.9% (NR)
6	August 30, 2012	5.8% (NR)	8.4% (NR)	5.6% (NR)	8.5% (NR)
7	September 5, 2012	4.7% (NR)	8.3% (NR)	4.6% (NR)	7.8% (NR)
8	September 6, 2012	5.4% (NR)	8.7% (NR)	5.4% (NR)	7.6% (NR)
9	September 12, 2012	5.5% (NR)	6.7% (NR)	5.4% (NR)	7.9% (NR)
10	September 13, 2012	5.8% (NR)	9.9% (NR)	5.8% (NR)	8.6% (NR)
11	September 19, 2012	4.3% (NR)	5.3% (NR)	4.2% (NR)	7.3% (NR)
12	September 20, 2012	5.1% (NR)	8.1% (NR)	4.6% (NR)	7.3% (NR)
13	September 26, 2012	4.4% (NR)	5.3% (NR)	4.4% (NR)	8.0% (NR)
14	September 27, 2012	4.8% (NR)	8.4% (NR)	4.8% (NR)	8.0% (NR)
15	October 3, 2012	4.0% (NR)	4.7% (NR)	4.1% (NR)	8.7% (NR)
16	October 4, 2012	5.3% (NR)	5.6% (NR)	5.2% (NR)	5.9% (NR)
Average		5.1%	-	5.1%	-
Special	August 26, 2012	5.0% (NR)	5.0% (NR)	7.9% (NR)	8.4% (NR)
