= Kim Ian =

South Korean actor and singer

- Born: Kim Bo-ryung; Paul Kim; March 28, 1987 (age 39); South Korea
- Occupations: Actor; singer; model
- Years active: 2010–present
- Agent: S.M. Entertainment
- Height: 1.84 m (6 ft 1/2 in)

Korean name
- Hangul: 김보령
- Hanja: 金寶鈴
- RR: Gim Boryeong
- MR: Kim Poryŏng

Stage name
- Hangul: 김이안
- Hanja: 金李安
- RR: Gim Ian
- MR: Kim Ian

Kim Ian (Korean: 김이안; Hanja: 金李安; born Kim Bo-ryung on March 28, 1987) is a South Korean actor and singer.

== Career ==
Kim can play the clarinet and his hobbies include soccer, Taekwondo, the saxophone, and piano.

Kim made his first appearance in f(x)'s endorsement of K-Swiss's 2010 Winter Collection. He was a temporary replacement for Amber for the photoshoot in Petite France (Gapyeong, Gyeonggi Province).

Kim then made his first variety appearance on MBC's 2011 Idol Star Athletics Championships. He was on Team A with label-mates Shinee, Super Junior, TRAX, and The Grace - Dana & Sunday

In 2011, Kim starred in the musical Singin' in the Rain as Donghyun. In 2012 he starred in his second musical Fantasy Couple as Jang Chul Soo with label-mate Sunday of The Grace. The musical was based on the highly rated 2006 drama Fantasy Couple.

In July 2012, Kim was confirmed to play Na Chul Soo in To the Beautiful You, the Korean adaptation of Hana-Kimi. His character's manga counterpart is Oscar M. Himejima, leader of Dormitory 3.

In January 2013, Kim starred as the male lead in Girls' Generation's music video for their lead single "I Got a Boy".

== Filmography ==
=== Film ===
Year	Title	Role
2014	The Pirates	Baek Chi

=== Television ===
Year	Title	Role	Network
2012	To the Beautiful You	Na Cheol-soo	SBS
2014	Sweden Laundry	Park Ki-joon	MBC Every 1
2016	Guardian: The Lonely and Great God		tvN
2018	Rich Man	Jang Do-il	MBN

=== Music video appearances ===
Year	Song title	Artist	Notes
2013	"I Got a Boy"	Girls' Generation	YouTube

== Musical theatre ==
Year	Title	Role
2011	Singin' in the Rain	Dong-hyun
2012	Fantasy Couple	Jang Chul-soo
