= Sweden Laundry =

- Promotional poster
- Genre: Romance; Drama; Comedy; Family; Fantasy
- Written by: Kim Yoon-hee; Lee Eun-young
- Directed by: Jung Hwan-suk; Kim Seung-il; Noh Ji-hye
- Starring: Song Ha-yoon; Changjo; Kim Ian
- Country of origin: South Korea
- Original language: Korean
- No. of episodes: 16

Production
- Executive producer: Jo Bum
- Producer: Lee Kang-sup
- Production location: Korea
- Running time: Fridays at 19:10 (KST)
- Production company: KOEN

Original release
- Network: MBC Every 1 MBC Dramanet
- Release: November 21, 2014 – March 6, 2015

Sweden Laundry (Korean: 스웨덴 세탁소; RR: Seuweden setakso) is a 2014 South Korean television series starring Song Ha-yoon, Changjo and Kim Ian. It aired on MBC Every 1/MBC Dramanet from November 21, 2014, to March 6, 2015, on Fridays at 19:10 for 16 episodes.

== Plot ==
Middle child Kim Bom (Song Ha-yoon) had a difficult childhood because her mother showered all her affection on Bom's older brother Eun-Chul and her younger sister Eun-sol. Now that Bom is an adult, she runs a laundromat named Sweden Laundry. But she also has the supernatural ability to understand her customers' worries through their laundry. With the help of her employee Yong Soo-Chul, Bom uses this to solve the problems of those around her.

== Cast ==
=== Main characters ===
- Song Ha-yoon as Kim Bom

Sassy Kim Bom runs a laundromat, and helps people with her ability to read their worries through their laundry. She communicates with her grandmother through her dreams. She had a crush on Ki-joon, which ended once she found out that he had a girlfriend.

- Changjo as Yong Soo-chul

He is 24 years old. He is a young and diligent worker who is in love with Bom. His passion is drawing.

- Kim Ian as Park Ki-joon

He is a 27-year-old dentist. He is smart and handsome, and has a girlfriend studying overseas.

=== Supporting characters ===
- Hwang Young-hee as Mom

She is a widow and works hard to make ends meet. She favors her eldest and youngest children.

- Oh Sang-jin as Kim Eun-chul

Brilliant yet unemployed, he studies all day. He later falls in love with Young-mi.

- Hwang Seung-eon as Kim Eun-sol

Eun-sol is an aspiring actress who doesn't get many roles. She is conceited and has a crush on Soo-Chul.

- Lee Yong-yi as Granny

She is deceased and gave Bom the power of reading others' inner thoughts through the laundry.

- Bae Noo-ri as Bae Young-mi

Young-mi has been Bom's best friend since they were in school together. She is a loan shark and is in love with Eun-Chul.

- Kim Ji-eun as Yoo Min-Yong

She is Ki-Joon's girlfriend.

=== Guest/cameo appearances ===
- Jung Ji-soon as naive man (ep 2)
- Ahn Daniel as Kim Min-ho (ep 5)
- Jeon Soo-jin as Hong Bo-hee (ep 6)
- Choi Eun-kyung as Young-mi's mother (ep 9)
- Byun Ki-soo as cheating husband (ep 10)
- Bae Ji-hyun as Han Chae-yeon (ep 10)
- Hyun Young as Hae-sook (ep 12)
- Jang Dong-min as Kim Kyung-jin (ep 14–15)

== Ratings ==
| Episode # | Broadcast date | Episode title | AGB National ratings |
|---|---|---|---|
| 1 | 2014/11/21 | Welcome to Dream Laundry | 0.502% |
| 2 | 2014/11/28 | How to Launder Lingering Regrets | - |
| 3 | 2014/12/05 | How to Launder Clothes to Find out the Truth | - |
| 4 | 2014/12/12 | Dry Cleaning a Stained Dream | - |
| 5 | 2014/12/19 | Saying Goodbye | - |
| 6 | 2014/12/26 | Ironing Out an Old Friendship | - |
| 7 | 2015/01/02 | Laundry Method for Brave Women | - |
| 8 | 2015/01/09 | Laundry to Comfort the Worried Young Adults | - |
| 9 | 2015/01/16 | How to Become an Adult Laundromat | - |
| 10 | 2015/01/23 | How to Recognize a Cheater's Laundry | 0.624% |
| 11 | 2015/01/30 | Please Don't Tell Me... | - |
| 12 | 2015/02/06 | Children are the parent's handcuffs | 0.680% |
| 13 | 2015/02/13 | Time to change the fate | - |
| 14 | 2015/02/20 | After losing to regret things | - |
| 15 | 2015/02/27 | Now the family, it's all right | - |
| 16 | 2015/03/06 | Vi ses (see you later), Sweden Laundry! | - |

== Original soundtrack ==
Sweden Laundry: Original Soundtrack

Soundtrack album by Various Artists
- Released: March 6, 2015
- Genre: Pop, K-pop, soundtrack, R&B
- Length: 36:46
- Language: Korean, English
- Label: LOEN Entertainment

| No. | Title | Lyrics | Music | Artist | Length |
|---|---|---|---|---|---|
| 1. | "첫사랑" (A Kind of Confession) | | | Kim Yoon-joo of OKDAL | 2:56 |
| 2. | "나아졌어" (Get Better) | | | Choi In-young | 3:27 |
| 3. | "Hey You" | | | Year 7 Class 1 | 3:28 |
| 4. | "얼마나 더" (How Much More?) | Na Byung-soo, Lee Jong-soo, and Joo Seung-hoon | Na Byung-soo, Lee Jong-soo, and Joo Seung-hoon | Park Narae of SPICA | 3:39 |
| 5. | "떨어진다" (Falling) | | | Jo Sung-min | 4:21 |
| Total length: | | | | | 36:46 |
