= Free Somebody =

- Digital cover

EP by Luna
- Released: May 31, 2016
- Recorded: 2016 at S.M. Studios, Seoul
- Genres: Synth-pop; R&B; electropop; future house
- Length: 20:24
- Language: Korean
- Labels: SM; KT Music
- Producer: Lee Soo-man (exec.)

Singles from Free Somebody
- 1. "Free Somebody" Released: May 31, 2016

Free Somebody is the debut extended play by South Korean singer Luna, released on May 31, 2016, by SM Entertainment, and distributed by KT Music. It contains six tracks, including the single and title song "Free Somebody". It debuted at number five on the Gaon Album Chart, and has sold over 10,000 copies. The EP marks Luna's debut as a solo artist, and incorporates a range of genres, including electropop and R&B.

== Background and release ==
On May 17, 2016, it was reported that Luna would make her solo debut in late June. This was confirmed on May 27 by S.M. Entertainment, with the announcement that Luna would debut as a solo artist with the mini album "Free Somebody" on May 31, with a title track of the same name.

On May 29, 2016, S.M. Entertainment posted a music video teaser for the title track. It was reported on May 30 that Luna composed the tracks "Pretty Girl (I Wish)" and "My Medicine".

The album was released digitally worldwide on May 31, 2016, along with a music video for the title track. In South Korea, the album was distributed physically and digitally by S.M. Entertainment and KT Music.

== Promotion ==
On May 30, 2016, Luna held a live preview of the album on the SMTOWN channel on the Naver V app.

Luna began promotions of title track "Free Somebody" on music shows on June 4. She first performed the song on Show! Music Core, followed by performances on SBS's Inkigayo, MBC's Show Champion, Mnet's M Countdown, KBS' Music Bank, and SBS M's The Show. She also performed the b-side "Keep On Doin'" several times, alongside the title track.

"Free Somebody" was also promoted on Yoo Hee-yeol's Sketchbook, at KCON 2016 in Paris, and the 2016 Miss Korea Competition.

== Singles ==
On May 26, 2016, Luna was announced to be releasing "Free Somebody", a promotional song for the album. A teaser video for the song was released on May 29, followed by its music video and digital release on May 31. Luna performed the song for the first time at the Show! Music Core. The song peaked at number 57 on Gaon Digital Chart.

== Composition ==
The title track is a future house track composed by Swedish production team "The Family" and the American singer-songwriter JoJo. Lyrically, the song describes a desire to freely spread the dreams in the heart of the other party. "Keep On Doin'" is of the electronic dance genre, and has an "addictive sound with a hook melody and a groovy funky base rhythm". "Breathe" is a trip hop based song, and "Galaxy" is of the electronic pop genre, its lyrics about "trying to stand out in the colourful galaxy".

"Pretty Girl (I Wish)" and "My Medicine" were both written and composed by Luna. According to Luna, the lyrics of "Pretty Girl (I Wish)" describe her hope that "young girls and young boys will never know the bitter taste of coffee and the dark side of the world". "My Medicine" is an "R&B ballad song with a warm and fantasy-like feeling" that Luna wrote for her mother.

== Reception ==
The EP entered the Gaon Album Chart at number five, and charted on the Billboard World Albums Chart at number three. It was the fifteenth best selling album in South Korea, in the month of May, selling over 8,000 physical copies. As of September 2016, it has sold over 10,000 copies.

Free Somebody was considered a refreshing and unexpected move from Luna's predominant image as a ballad singer, its electronic style resonating especially with international audiences.

=== Accolades ===
Publication	Accolade	Year	Rank	Ref.
Xiami	Top 50 Most Popular Albums of 2016	2016	15	
Billboard	World Digital Song Tally	2016	8	Title Track - Free Somebody

== Track listing ==
Track listing for Free Somebody
No.	Title	Lyrics	Music	Length
1.	"Free Somebody"	Kim Min-ji; Seo Ji-eum; JQ	Anton Malmberg Hård af Segerstad; Joy Neil Mitro Deb; Linnea Mary Han Deb; Joanna "JoJo" Levesque	3:20
2.	"Breathe"	Ku Tae-woo	Henk Jan Kooistra; Jantine Annika Heij	3:39
3.	"Keep On Doin'"	Le'mon; JQ; Bae Seong-hyeon	Sara Forsberg; Anton Malmberg Hård af Segerstad; Joy Neil Mitro Deb; Linnea Mary Han Deb	3:13
4.	"I Wish" (예쁜 소녀 (Pretty Girl))	Luna; Choi (LU:KUS)	Luna; Park Seul-gi; Choi (LU:KUS)	3:43
5.	"Galaxy"	Jo Yoon-kyung	Edward Ross Lara; Todd Wright; Phoebe Sharp; Cassidy Ford; Sean Kendall	3:06
6.	"My Medicine"	Luna; Choi (LU:KUS)	Luna; Park Seul-gi; Choi (LU:KUS)	3:23
Total length:				20:24

== Charts ==
=== Weekly charts ===
Chart	Peak position
US World Albums (Billboard)	3

=== Monthly charts ===
Chart	Position
Korean Albums (Gaon Album Chart)	15

== Release history ==
Region	Date	Format	Label
South Korea	May 31, 2016	CD, digital download	S.M. Entertainment, KT Music
Worldwide	May 31, 2016	Digital download	S.M. Entertainment
