= 2013 Idol Star Olympics Championships =

The 2013 Idol Star Athletics Championships (Korean: 아이돌 스타 올림픽), also known as the 2013 Idol Athletics - Chuseok Special, was held at Goyang Gymnasium in Goyang, South Korea on September 3, 2013 and was broadcast on MBC from September 19 to 20, 2013. At the championships a total number of 10 events (7 in athletics, 2 in archery and 1 in futsal) were contested: 5 by men and 5 by women. There were a total number of 160 participating K-pop singers and celebrities, divided into 5 teams.

== Results ==
=== Men ===
Athletics

| Event | Gold | Silver | Bronze |
|---|---|---|---|
| 100 m | Team A Sanghoon (100%) | Team D Lee Minhyuk (BtoB) | Team B Hoya (Infinite) |
| 4 × 100 m | Team B L (Infinite); Woohyun (Infinite); Dongwoo (Infinite); Hoya (Infinite) | Team A Ricky (Teen Top); Chunji (Teen Top); C.A.P (Teen Top); Changjo (Teen Top) | Team D Yong-guk (B.A.P); Dae-hyun (B.A.P); Jong Up (B.A.P); Youngjae (B.A.P) |
| High jump | Team D Lee Minhyuk (BtoB) | Team A Niel (Teen Top) | Team D Yook Sungjae (BtoB); Jong Up (B.A.P) |

Archery

| Event | Gold | Silver | Bronze |
|---|---|---|---|
| Men's team | Team A Gongchan (B1A4); Jinyoung (B1A4); CNU (B1A4) | Team D Mir (MBLAQ); Seungho (MBLAQ); Cheondung (MBLAQ) | Team C Kim Dong-jun (ZE:A) |

Futsal

| Event | Gold | Silver | Bronze |
|---|---|---|---|
| Futsal | Team D | Team A | Team C |

=== Women ===
Athletics

| Event | Gold | Silver | Bronze |
|---|---|---|---|
| 100 m | Team B Gaeun (Dal Shabet) | Team E Sujin (Wassup) | Team A Jisoo (Tahiti) |
| 4 x 50 m | Team B Chanmi (AOA); Mina (AOA); Jimin (AOA); Choa (AOA) | Team C Juhyun (Spica); Bohyung (Spica); Narae (Spica); Jiwon (Spica) | Team D Bomi (Apink); Naeun (Apink); Hayoung (Apink); Namjoo (Apink) |
| 4 × 100 m | Team D Bomi (Apink); Hayoung (Apink); Naeun (Apink); Namjoo (Apink) | Team B Gaeun (Dal Shabet); Jiyul (Dal Shabet); Woohee (Dal Shabet); Serri (Dal Shabet) | Team A Jaekyung (Rainbow); Woori (Rainbow); Seungah (Rainbow); Hyunyoung (Rainbow) |
| High jump | Team A Jia (Miss A) | Team A Woori (Rainbow) | Team A Fei (Miss A) |

Archery

| Event | Gold | Silver | Bronze |
|---|---|---|---|
| Women's team | Team A Yoonhye (Rainbow); Woori (Rainbow); Jaekyung (Rainbow) | Team B Hyeri (Girl's Day); Minah (Girl's Day); Sojin (Girl's Day) | Team D (Secret) |

== Ratings ==
| Episode # | Original broadcast date | TNmS Ratings | | AGB Nielsen Ratings | |
| Episode # | Original broadcast date | Nationwide | Seoul National Capital Area | Nationwide | Seoul National Capital Area |
|---|---|---|---|---|---|
| 1 | September 19, 2013 | 9.0% | 10.3% | 9.3% | 10.1% |
| 2 | September 20, 2013 | 8.2% | 9.0% | 8.1% | 8.8% |
