= 2012 Idol Star Olympics Championships =

The 2012 Idol Star Olympics Championship (Korean: 아이돌 스타 올림픽) was held at Mokdong Stadium in Seoul (on July 10, 2012) and Yong In University General Gymnasium in Yongin, South Korea and was broadcast on MBC from July 25 to 26, 2012. At the championships, a total number of 14 events (9 in athletics, 2 in archery, 2 in fencing and 1 in table tennis) were contested: 7 by men, 5 by women and 2 mixed. There were a total number of 150 participating K-pop singers and celebrities, divided into 9 teams.

== Results ==
=== Men ===
Athletics

Event	Gold	Silver	Bronze
100 m	Team C Simon (Dalmatian)	Team A Baro (B1A4)	Team E Jo Kwon (2AM)
110 m Hurdles	Team E Minho (Shinee)	Team C Simon (Dalmatian)	Team E Seulong (2AM)
4 X 50 m (Racewalking relay)	Team E Changmin (2AM); Jinwoon (2AM); Jo Kwon (2AM); Seulong (2AM)		
Long jump	Team E Seulong (2AM)	Team B Minwoo (ZE:A)	Team D Woohyun (Infinite)
High jump	Team F Niel (Teen Top)	Team E Jinwoon (2AM)	Team A Sandeul (B1A4)

Fencing

Event	Gold	Silver	Bronze
Individual sabre	Jinyoung (B1A4)	Jinwoon (2AM)	Jungshin (CNBLUE)
Individual sabre	Jinyoung (B1A4)	Jinwoon (2AM)	Lee Joon (MBLAQ)

Archery

Event	Gold	Silver	Bronze
Men's team	ZE:A; Dongjun; Hyungsik; Kevin	MBLAQ; Mir; Seungho; Thunder	Infinite; Dongwoo; L Sungjong
Men's team	ZE:A; Dongjun; Hyungsik; Kevin	MBLAQ; Mir; Seungho; Thunder	Teen Top; Changjo; Chunji; Ricky

=== Women ===
Athletics

Event	Gold	Silver	Bronze
100 m	Team C Gaeun (Dal Shabet)	Team B Eunji (Nine Muses)	Team H Bora (Sistar)
4 X 50 m (Racewalking relay)	Team H Bora (Sistar); Dasom (Sistar); Hyolyn (Sistar); Soyou (Sistar)		
High jump	Team H Bora (Sistar)	Team F Minah (Girl's Day)	Team E NS Yoonji

Fencing

Event	Gold	Silver	Bronze
Individual sabre	Victoria (f(x))	Sunhwa (Secret)	Fei (Miss A)
Individual sabre	Victoria (f(x))	Sunhwa (Secret)	Hwayoung (T-ara)

Archery

Event	Gold	Silver	Bronze
Women's team	Team H Bora (Sistar); Dasom (Sistar); Soyou (Sistar)	Hyosung (Secret); Jieun (Secret); Zinger (Secret)	Team G Jooyeon (After School); Jungah (After School); Uee (After School)
Women's team	Team H Bora (Sistar); Dasom (Sistar); Soyou (Sistar)	Hyosung (Secret); Jieun (Secret); Zinger (Secret)	Amber (f(x)); Luna (f(x)); Victoria (f(x))

=== Mixed ===
Table Tennis

Event	Gold	Silver	Bronze
Mixed doubles	Nichkhun (2PM); Jiyeon (T-ara)	Changmin (2AM); Amber (f(x))	

Special event for rookies

Event	Gold	Silver	Bronze
400 m	Casper (Cross Gene)		
400 m	Tia (Chocolat)		

== Ratings ==
Episode #	Original broadcast date	TNmS Ratings		AGB Nielsen Ratings	
Episode #	Original broadcast date	Nationwide	Seoul National Capital Area	Nationwide	Seoul National Capital Area
1	July 25, 2012	6.8%	8.4%	6.4%	7.8%
2	July 26, 2012	8.1%	9.0%	7.9%	9.2%
