= 2019 Chuseok Idol Star Championships =

- Also known as: 2019 Idol Star Athletics Championships Chuseok Special
- Genre: Sports; Variety show
- Presented by: Jun Hyun-moo; Leeteuk; Twice
- Country of origin: South Korea
- Original language: Korean
- No. of episodes: 2

Production
- Production location: Samsan World Gymnasium
- Running time: 180 minutes

Original release
- Network: MBC
- Release: September 12 – September 13, 2019

The 2019 Idol Star Championships Chuseok Special (Korean: 2019 추석특집 아이돌스타 선수권대회) was held at Goyang Gymnasium in Goyang was broadcast on MBC on September 12 and 13, 2019.

== Cast ==
=== Presenters ===
Jun Hyun-moo, Super Junior's Leeteuk and Dahyun (Twice).

=== Main ===
Full 2019 Chuseok ISAC line-up

== Results ==
=== Men ===
Athletics

Event	Gold	Silver	Bronze
60 m	Hwalchan (GreatGuys)	YunSung (Noir)	Lee Jang Jun (Golden Child)
4 × 100 m	Golden Child	THE BOYZ	ASTRO

Archery

Event	Gold	Silver	Bronze
Men's Team	NCT 127	Stray Kids	

Ssireum

Event	Gold	Silver	Bronze
Men's Team	ASTRO	AB6IX	No Winner

Penalty Shoot-out

Event	Gold	Silver	Bronze
Penalty Shoot-out	NCT 127	ASTRO	No Winner

=== Women ===
Athletics

Event	Gold	Silver	Bronze
60 m	YeonJung (Holics)	Yeoreum (WJSN)	Yves (Loona)
4 × 100 m	Cosmic Girls	Iz*One	Dreamcatcher

Archery

Event	Gold	Silver	Bronze
Women's Team	Cosmic Girls	Lovelyz	No Winner

Ssireum

Event	Gold	Silver	Bronze
Women's Team	Cosmic Girls	Cherry Bullet	

Pitching

Event	Gold	Silver	Bronze
Women	Jiwon (Cherry Bullet)	Yeji (Itzy)	JoHyun (Berry Good)

Fastest Pitch : Yeji (Itzy)

=== Mixed ===
Esports

Event	Gold	Silver	Bronze
PUBG Solo	Lou (VAV)	Dawon (SF9)	SeulChan (TARGET)
PUBG Squad	NCT Dream	TREI and Dreamcatcher	

Horseback riding

Event	Gold	Silver	Bronze
Individual	Jiwon (fromis 9)	Haknyeon (The Boyz)	JoHyun (Berry Good)

== Ratings ==
Episode #	Original broadcast date	AGB Nielsen Ratings
Episode #	Original broadcast date	Nationwide
1	September 12, 2019	4.5%
2	September 13, 2019	5.2%
