= 2011 Idol Star Athletics – Swimming Championships =

The 2011 Idol Star Athletics – Swimming Championships (Korean: 아이돌 스타 육상 - 수영 선수권 대회) was held at Jamsil Arena in Seoul, South Korea on January 23, 2011 and was broadcast on MBC from February 5 to 6, 2011. At the championships a total number of 5 events in athletics and 2 events in swimming were contested: 4 by men and 3 by women. There were a total number of 140 participating K-pop singers and celebrities, divided into 17 teams.

== Men ==
Athletics

Event	Gold	Silver	Bronze
50 m	Team J Dongjun (ZE:A)	Team L Lee Hyun (8Eight)	Team L Jo Kwon (2AM)
50 m Hurdles	Team O Minho (Shinee)	Team J Dongjun (ZE:A)	Team F Soohyun (U-KISS)
High jump	Team O Minho (Shinee)	Team N Nichkhun (2PM)	Team L Jinwoon (2AM)

Swimming

Event	Gold	Silver	Bronze
50 m freestyle	Team O Minho (Shinee)	Team L Seulong (2AM)	Team P Lee Jang-woo

== Women ==
Athletics

Event	Gold	Silver	Bronze
50 m	Team E Bora (SISTAR)	Team J Eunji (Nine Muses)	Team N Fei (Miss A)
High jump	Team O Luna (f(x))	Team N Fei (Miss A)	
High jump	Team O Luna (f(x))	Team C Kahi (After School)	

Swimming

- Special appearance and swimming performance by Jeong Da-rae.

Event	Gold	Silver	Bronze
50 m freestyle	Team K Woori (Rainbow)	Team K Jaekyung (Rainbow)	Team J Eunji (Nine Muses)

== Ratings ==
Episode #	Original broadcast date	TNmS Ratings		AGB Nielsen Ratings	
Episode #	Original broadcast date	Nationwide	Seoul National Capital Area	Nationwide	Seoul National Capital Area
1	February 5, 2011	14.7%	19.1%	18.7%	21.9%
2	February 6, 2011	14.6%	19.8%	17.6%	20.4%
