= 2011 Idol Star Athletics Championships =

The 2011 Idol Star Championships in Athletics (Korean: 아이돌스타 육상 선수권 대회), also known as "2011 Idol Athletics – Chuseok Special", was held at Mokdong Stadium in Seoul, South Korea on August 27, 2011 and was broadcast on MBC on September 13, 2011 (two episodes). At the championships a total number of 11 events in athletics were contested: 6 by men and 5 by women. There were a total number of 150 participating K-pop singers and celebrities, divided into 12 teams.

== Results ==
=== Men ===
Event	Gold	Silver	Bronze
100 m	Team C Dongjun (ZE:A)	Team H Baro (B1A4)	Team J Sangchu (Mighty Mouth)
110 m Hurdles	Team C Dongjun (ZE:A)	Team J Sangchu (Mighty Mouth)	Team A Minho (Shinee)
4 X 100 m	Team J Lee Hyun (8Eight); Sangchu (Mighty Mouth); Noh Ji-hoon; Baek Chung-kang	Team C Lee Hoo (ZE:A); Minwoo (ZE:A); Hyungsik (ZE:A); Dongjun (ZE:A)	Team A Kim Ian; Eunhyuk (Super Junior); Kyuhyun (Super Junior); Minho (Shinee)
Long jump	Team C Minwoo (ZE:A)	Team J Lee Hyun (8Eight)	Team A Jungmo (TraxX)
High jump	Team A Minho (Shinee)	Team G Sungyeol (Infinite)	
High jump	Team J Sangchu (Mighty Mouth)	Team J Noh Ji-hoon	

=== Women ===
Event	Gold	Silver	Bronze
100 m	Team C Eunji (Nine Muses)	Team B Bora (Sistar)	Team F Bomi (Apink)
100 m Hurdles	Team G Jia (Miss A)	Team H Gaeun (Dal Shabet)	Team B Hyolyn (Sistar)
4 X 50 m (Racewalking relay)	Team B Bora (Sistar); Dasom (Sistar); Hyolyn (Sistar); Soyou (Sistar)	Team F Namjoo (Apink); Yookyung (Apink); Chorong (Apink); Eunji (Apink)	Team K Riko (Rania); Di (Rania); Xia (Rania); Jooyi (Rania)
4 X 100 m	Team B Hyolyn (Sistar); Dasom (Sistar); Soyou (Sistar); Bora (Sistar)	Team C Sera (Nine Muses); Baby J (Jewelry); Yewon (Jewelry); Eunji (Nine Muses)	Team H Gaeun (Dal Shabet); Jiyul (Dal Shabet); Serri (Dal Shabet); Viki (Dal Shabet)
High jump	Team G Fei (Miss A)	Team L NS Yoonji	Team B Soyou (Sistar)

== Ratings ==
Episode #	Original broadcast date	TNmS Ratings		AGB Nielsen Ratings	
Episode #	Original broadcast date	Nationwide	Seoul National Capital Area	Nationwide	Seoul National Capital Area
1	September 13, 2011	10.9%	13.4%	11.8%	15.9%
2	September 13, 2011	14.2%	16.9%	13.2%	17.8%
