= Luna (South Korean singer) =

South Korean singer (born 1993)

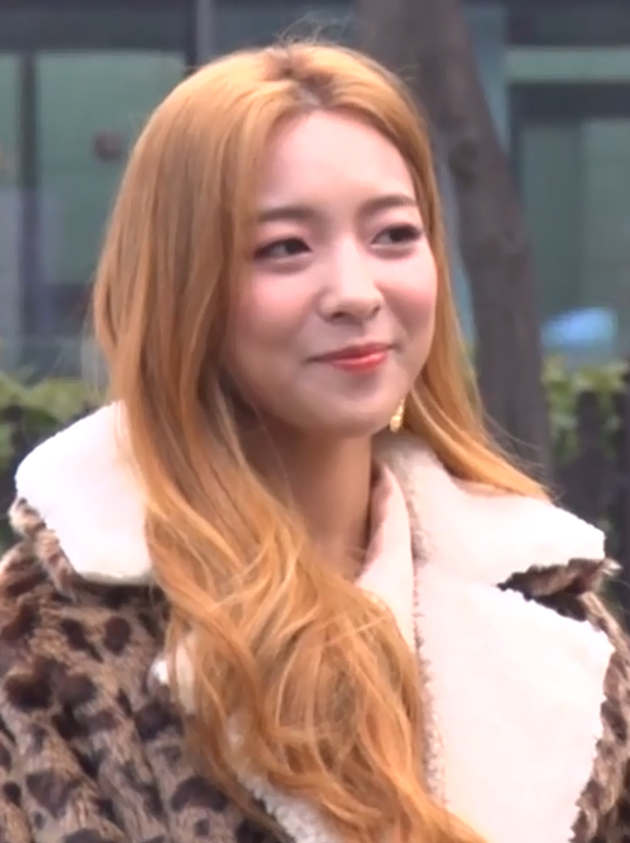
- Luna in January 2019
- Born: Park Sun-young; August 12, 1993 (age 33); Seoul, South Korea
- Education: Chung-Ang University
- Occupations: Singer; dancer; musical actress; television host
- Years active: 2009–present
- Musical career
- Genres: K-pop; R&B; electropop; ballad
- Instrument: Vocals
- Years active: 2009–present
- Labels: SM; Humap Contents; Grida
- Member of: f(x)

Korean name
- Hangul: 박선영
- RR: Bak Seonyeong
- MR: Pak Sŏnyŏng

Signature
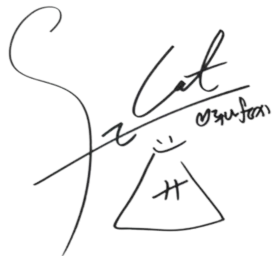

Park Sun-young (Korean: 박선영; born August 12, 1993), known professionally as Luna (루나), is a South Korean singer, dancer, musical actress and television host. She debuted as a member of the girl group f(x) in September 2009. In May 2016, Luna released her solo EP Free Somebody. In November 2019, the single "Free Somebody" was listed in Billboard's greatest K-pop songs of the 2010s. In September 2019, Luna left SM Entertainment and joined Humap Contents. In February 2021, Luna established her own entertainment agency, Grida Entertainment.

Aside from her music career, Luna has established herself as a musical actress, notably through her participation in the original and Korean versions of stage musicals including Legally Blonde (2010–2011), Coyote Ugly (2011), High School Musical on Stage! (2013), School OZ Hologram Musical (2014), In the Heights (2015–2016), Rebecca (2017), Rudolf (The Last Kiss) (2017–2018), Autant en emporte le vent (Gone with The Wind) (2018), Mamma Mia! (2019–2020), and The Days (2020–2021). She made her Broadway debut as the lead of KPOP (2022), a K-Pop-themed musical that featured several idols including herself. She also starred in the film The Lightning Man's Secret (2015).

On television, Luna hosted the music program The Show (2011), the third season of the reality show Get It Beauty (2016). She also appeared as a regular cast member on the reality shows Strong Girls (2017), The Suitcase Man (2017), The Taming of the Shrew 2 (2017), Beauty Code (2017), and Dressing Table 3 (2017–2018).

== Early life ==
Luna was born as Park Sun-young in Seoul, South Korea on August 12, 1993, to a family of classical vocal singers. She has an older brother, and an older twin sister named Park Jin-young. Luna is the only member of her family to not major in classical music.

== Career ==
=== 2006–2010: Career beginnings ===
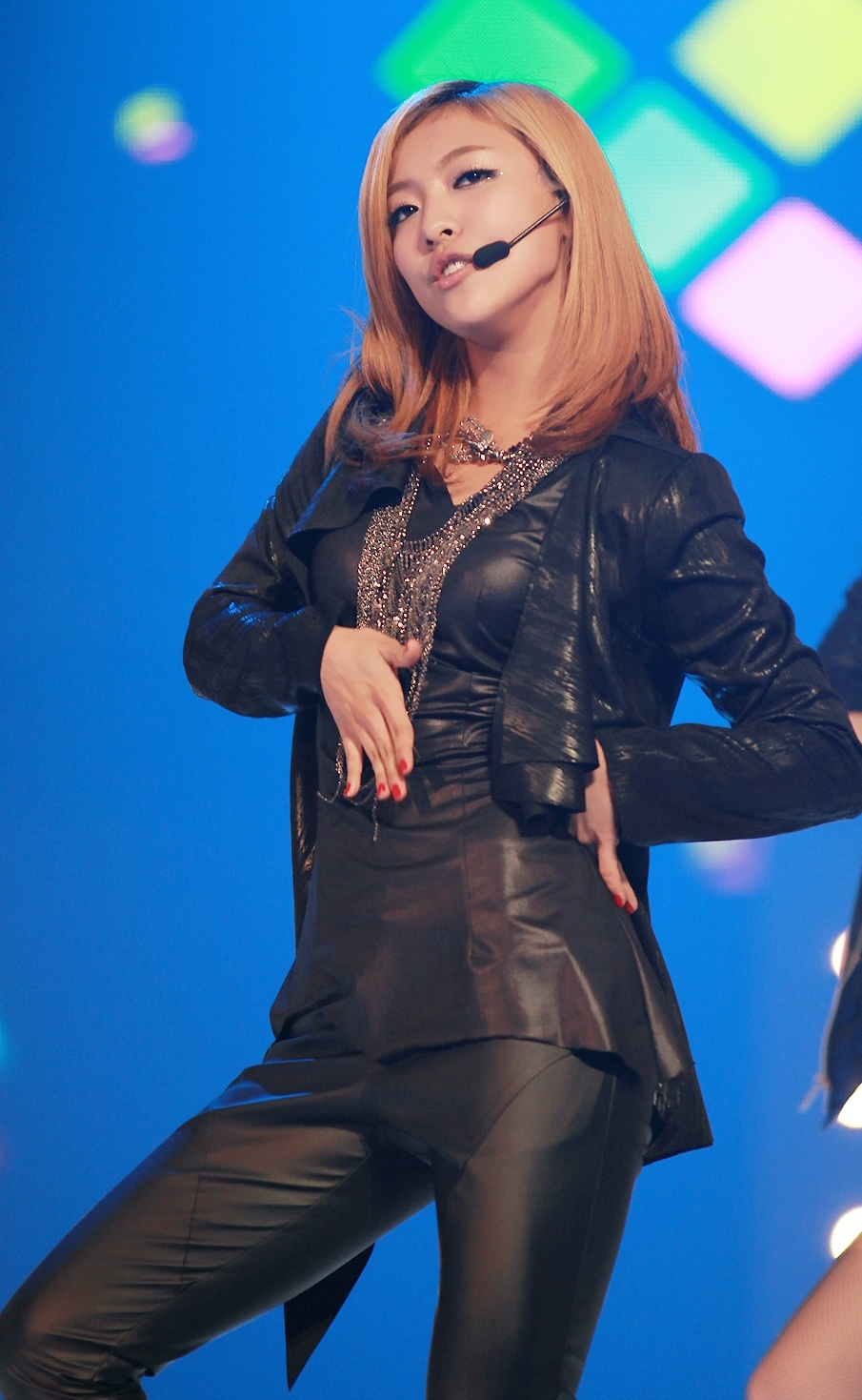
Luna in 2010

In 2006, SM Entertainment recruited Luna after seeing her perform on the SBS television program Truth Game. She later debuted as the main vocalist and lead dancer of South Korean girl group f(x) in September 2009. Outside the group's activities, Luna also made several solo appearances.

In 2010, she appeared as a regular member of Star King and earned a Newcomer Award from the SBS Entertainment Awards for her appearance and effort. Later that year, Luna recorded the song "Let's Go" alongside labelmates Sungmin, Seohyun, and Jonghyun, for the purpose of increasing public participation in the 2010 G-20 Seoul summit. She released a duet with Super Junior's Yesung entitled "And I Love You" for the soundtrack of the KBS2 drama The President and a solo single "Beautiful Day", which served as the OST for the drama Please Marry Me.

=== 2011–2015: Solo activities ===
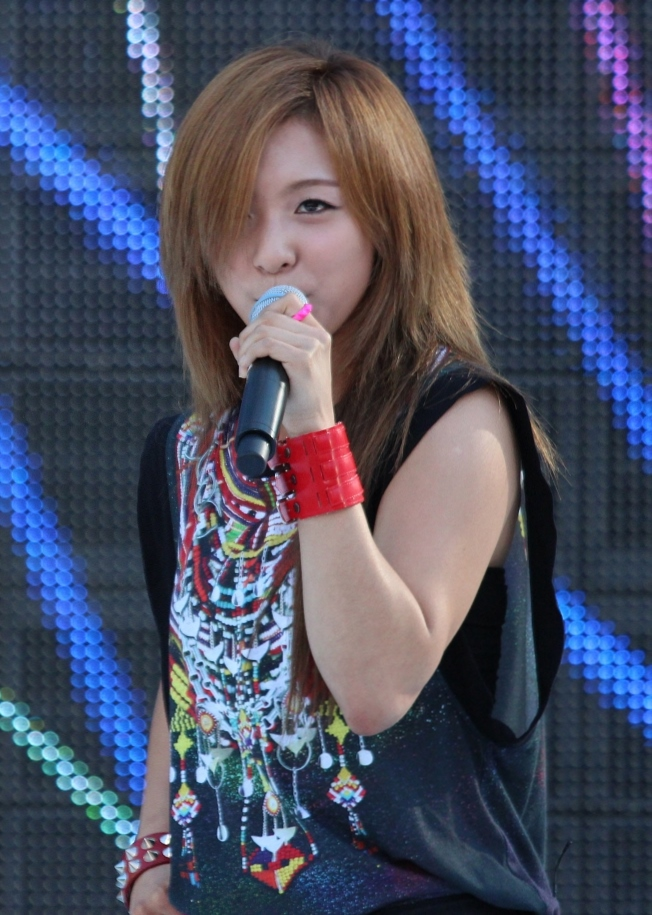
Luna performing at the M Super Concert 2012

In 2011, Luna was reported to make her musical debut, portraying the character Elle Woods in Legally Blonde. In April, she started hosting the music program The Show from MTV Korea along with Secret's Hyoseong. Luna was cast in the TV Chosun drama entitled Saving Mrs. Go Bong-shil as Seo In-young, a college student and youngest daughter of the title character, which first aired in December 2011. It was her drama debut alongside SS501's Kim Kyu Jong.

In 2012, she appeared on Immortal Songs 2 as a contestant, performing Magma's "I Can't Know." Luna won first place for her performance. In the same year, she released a duet with Girls' Generation's Sunny for the SBS drama To The Beautiful You soundtrack and solo single "It's Okay" for the SBS drama Cheongdam Alice's OST. The following year, Luna returned to musical performance, portraying Gabriella Montez in the Korean version of High School Musical on Stage!. She also recorded duets with Super Junior members Ryeowook for the musical, and Kyuhyun for The Croods soundtrack, as well as solo single "U+Me" which was used as the theme song for the game Softmax TalesWeaver.

In 2014, Luna was chosen to feature on "Dream Drive," the debut single of co-ed project team Play The Siren. In March, she was confirmed to be one of the hosts for MBC Music's new survival b-boy competition program Dance Battle Korea. Luna also starred as Diana in SM Entertainment's first hologram musical School OZ, alongside labelmates Changmin, Key, Suho, Xiumin, and Seulgi.

In March 2015, she was announced to be acting in the web drama entitled Jumping Girl, alongside Block B members U-Kwon and B-Bomb. This would be her first time playing the female lead in an acting project. Subsequently, Luna was also cast as the main female lead in the children's movie, Thunderman's Secret. In the same year, she participated on MBC's King of Masked Singer and received widespread praise for her performance. Luna released the digital single "Don't Cry For Me", a remake of Lee Eun Ha's hit song from 1986, on May 10, to thank her fans and viewers of King of Masked Singer for supporting her during her run in the program. She also took part in the Anh Chi Hwan special for Immortal Song 2, and showcased her powerful singing ability with her cover of the classic hit "Salt Doll". In July 2015, it was announced that Luna would star as Nina Rosario in the Korean production of the Broadway musical In The Heights, which began in September of that year and came to a close in November. At the end of the year, she collaborated with Ailee, Apink's Eun-ji & Mamamoo's Solar at the 2015 SBS Gayo Daejun to perform a cover of Jinju's "I'm Okay" for the Limited Edition I - Diva Together section of the show, on December 27.

=== 2016–2019: Solo debut and musical theatre activities ===
In April 2016, Luna was appointed as a fixed presenter of OnStyle TV's "Get it Beauty" program. On May 6, 2016, she released a collaborative single with Amber, R3hab, and Xavi&Gi, "Wave", as part of the SM Station project. On May 17, 2016, it was rumored that Luna would debut as a solo artist with a mini album in mid June, which was confirmed on May 26. On May 31, 2016, she made her solo debut with the mini album, Free Somebody, complete with 6 songs, including a title track of the same name. In August 2016, Luna reprised her role as Nina in the Tokyo shows of In The Heights. Also that month, she launched her YouTube channel, Luna's Alphabet, on which she uploads vlogs twice a week. On October 2, 2016, Luna released another collaborative single with Amber, featuring Ferry Corsten and Kago Pengchi, as part of SM Station, titled "Heartbeat". On December 16, 2016, she collaborated with Shin Yong-jae to release "It's You", also as part of the SM Station project. On December 30, Luna collaborated with Yesung, Sunny, Red Velvet's Seulgi and Wendy, NCT's Taeil and Doyoung, and Lee Dong-woo, on "Sound of Your Heart", SM Station's final song of 2016.

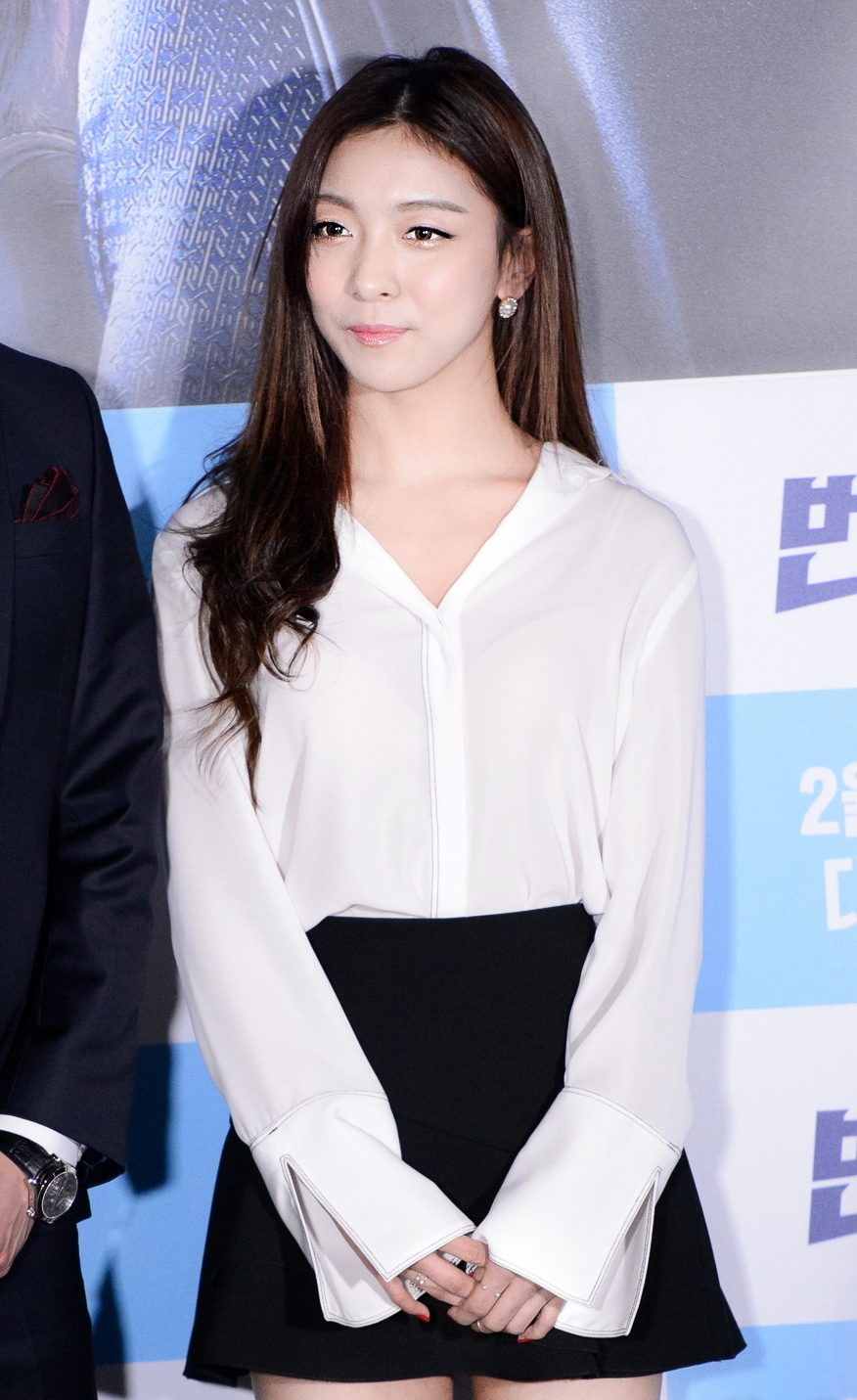
Luna at The Lightning Man's Secret VIP premiere, February 3, 2016.

In January 2017, it was confirmed that Luna was cast to star in the food variety show Strong Girls, alongside Park Bo-ram, Fiestar's Cao Lu, Young-ji, and Giant Pink. The show's first episode aired on E Channel on January 23. On January 12, a collaborative song between Luna, Beast's Junhyung, and Jeong Hyeong-don, entitled "Tell Me It's Okay" was released, produced through the show Hitmaker. Also on January 12, it was announced that Luna, EXID's Hani, and Mamamoo's Solar would release a collaborative dance song on January 19, produced by Park Geun-tae. It was later revealed that the song's title is "Honey Bee", and is of the pop soul genre, incorporating 808 bass and saxophone. On January 28, she performed "Father" on Immortal Songs 2 as part of the show's 'Lunar New Year Family Special', with her sister, Jin-young, winning first place.

On May 30, 2017, it was announced that Luna would be starring in the 2017 South Korean musical production of Rebecca, alongside Shin Young-sook, Jung Young-ju, Kim Sun-young, and Lee Sang-hyun, with performances expected to begin in August. On July 15, she released an OST for the drama Good Thief, Bad Thief, titled "Where Are You". On August 15, Luna also released an OST for the drama The King in Love, titled "Could You Tell Me". On October 16, 2017, it was announced that she would be in the musical "The Last Kiss", also titled Rudolf in other countries, Luna will play the role of Rudolf's lover Mary Vetsera. On November 17, she collaborated on a global version of the main track "This Is Me", from the movie The Greatest Showman, along with singers and influencers from 18 countries. Luna released a solo version of the song YouTube.

On January 5, 2018, Luna released a collaborative single with Amber, "Lower", as part of SM Station project. On February 9, 2018, Luna collaborated with Heda, a winner of "everysing" app, as part of SM Station project, to re-release a duet version of "Free Somebody". On February 20, 2018, she released an OST for the drama Should We Kiss First?, titled "Is It Love?". In April, 2018, it was announced that Luna would release her next solo release this month, marked it as her comeback after 2 years with her debut mini album, Free Somebody. On April 24, Luna released her new single, "Night Reminiscin'", featuring Yang Da-il, included with a B-side track, "Falling Out". In January 2019, Luna released a new single called "Even So", including 2 B-side tracks, "안녕 이대로 안녕 (Bye Bye)", and "Do You Love Me" featuring Korean-American singer Johan Kim.

=== 2019–present: Departure from SM Entertainment ===
On September 5, 2019, SM Entertainment announced that Luna had not renewed her contract with the company. In October 2019, she signed with Humap Contents.

In 2020, Luna lent her voice in single "Flow" for an original character named Luna Snow in NetEase and Marvel Entertainment's mobile game Marvel Super War.

On February 24, 2021, it was confirmed that Luna established her own entertainment agency, Grida Entertainment.

On September 24, 2021, it was confirmed that Luna would release a digital single in early October. Luna officially released the new single entitled "Madonna" on October 6.

In 2022, Luna portrayed the lead role of MwE in the Broadway musical KPOP, which marked her Broadway debut. The production ran from November until December 2022, after 44 previews and 17 performances.

In December 2023, Luna held her solo concert, "The Love Affair: A Night Of Music", at Bear Hall Theater in Seoul.

== Philanthropy ==
In February 2017, Luna revealed an underwear collection that she designed in collaboration with C'esttout called Girls Can Do Anything, where proceeds would be donated to the Korean Unwed Mothers' Families Association, an organization that assists single mothers and their families in South Korea. She also donated over 14,000 sanitary pads to the association.

== Personal life ==
In October 2011, it was confirmed that Luna had been accepted at Chung-Ang University's Institute of the Arts as a theater major through a special rolling admissions screening process.

== Discography ==
=== Extended plays ===
- Free Somebody (2016)

== Filmography ==
=== Film ===
Year	Title	Role	Notes	Ref.
2015	The Lightning Man's Secret	Han-na	Lead Role	

=== Television drama ===
Year	Title	Role	Notes	Ref.
2011–12	Saving Mrs. Go Bong-shil	Seo In-young		
2015	Jumping Girl	Nam Sang-ah	web drama	

=== Variety shows ===
Year	Title	Role	Notes	Ref.
2010	Idol Star Trot Battle (Chuseok Special)	Contestant	Sang Because I'm a Girl with Onew	
2010	Idol Star Athletics Championships	Contestant	Won Gold in High Jump; Won Silver in 100 m Hurdles	
2010	Youth Alkkagi (Chuseok Special)	Contestant	Alkkagi Battle with IU	
2010	Trend E The Muzit	Herself	Sang Evanescence's Bring Me to Life with TRAX	
2010	Let's Go! Dream Team	Herself	October 31	
2010–2011	Star King	Regular panelist	Episode 159, 165–166, 169, 172–174, 176–180, 182, 184, 200–201 and 220–222	
2011	Idol Star Athletics – Swimming Championships	Contestant	Won Gold in High Jump	
2011	Come to Play	Herself	March 14 episode (with Jiyeon and IU)	
2011	The Show	Host	Season 1 Pairing with Hyoseong (Secret)	
2012	Immortal Songs 2	Contestant	Episode 64–70	
2013	Take Two with Phineas and Ferb (Korean Version)	Herself	June 28	
2014	Music Travel Yesterday	Herself	March 15 episode Sang Lee Sun-hee's I Always Miss You	
2014	Dance Battle Korea	Host	April 15 episode	
2015	Idol Star Athletics Basketball Futsal Archery Championships	Contestant	Won Gold in High Jump	
2015	King of Mask Singer	Contestant	April 5 – April 12: 1st Generation Mask King; April 19 – April 26: 2nd Generation Mask King; May 3 – May 10: Eliminated by Third Generation challenger	
2015	Radio Star	Herself	May 27 episode	
2015	Global Request Show: A Song For You	Host	August 24 – September 4	
2015	Immortal Songs 2	Contestant	Episode 225; Sang Ahn Ji-hwan's Salt Doll	
2016	Duet Song Festival	Contestant	Episode 1 Sang Yim Jae-beom's For You with Goo Hyun-mo	
2016	You Hee-yeol's Sketchbook	Herself	Episode 322	
2016	Comedy Big League (Season 5)	Featured guest	Episode 173	
2016	King of Mask Singer	Celebrity panelist	Episode 71 and 72	
2016	Pan Stealer – Korean Traditional Music Strikes Back	Herself	Episode 6 Special collaboration with Jambinai From the Place to Be Erased	
2016	Tribe of Hip Hop (Season 1)	Featured artist	Sang Turtle Ship with Kim Young-ok and Joo-heon	
2016	Tribe of Hip Hop (Season 2)	Featured artist	Episode 11; Sang My Time with G2 and Moon Hee-kyung	
2016	Get It Beauty	Host (Season 3)	May 13 – December 31	
2017	Hitmaker (Season 3)	Regular cast	Episode 5–6	
2017	Strong Girls	Regular cast	January 23 – April 10	
2017	The Suitcase Man	Regular cast	Episode 2–15	
2017	Singing Battle	Hidden card	Episode 14; Sang JYP & Sunye's Afternoon Separation	
2017	Immortal Songs 2	Contestant	Episode 288; Sang Insooni's Father with twin sister, Park Jin Young	
2017	The Taming of the Shrew 2	Regular cast	July 4 – August 23	
2017	Beauty's Code	Regular cast	With Seo Hyo-rim and Kim Jung-min	
2017 – 2018	Dressing Table 3	Regular cast	October 31, 2017 – January 16, 2018	

=== Video games ===
Year	Title	Role	Ref.
2020	Marvel Super War	Luna Snow	

== Musical theatre ==
Year	Title	Role	Ref.
2010–2011	Legally Blonde	Elle Woods	
2011	Coyote Ugly	Violet Sanford	
2013	High School Musical on Stage!	Gabriella Montez	
2014	School OZ Hologram Musical	Diana	
2015–2016	In the Heights	Nina Rosario	
2017	Rebecca	I	
2017–2018	Rudolf (The Last Kiss)	Mary Vetsera	
2018	Autant en emporte le vent (Gone with The Wind)	Scarlett O'Hara	
2019–2020	Mamma Mia!	Sophie	
2020–2021	The Days	Her	
2022	KPOP	MwE	

== Concerts and tours ==
=== Headlining ===
- The fragrance of Luna (2019)
- 2021, Back to LUNA! (2021)
- The Love Affair : A Night Of Music (2023)

== Awards and nominations ==
Name of the award ceremony, year presented, category, nominee of the award, and the result of the nomination
Award ceremony	Year	Category	Nominee / work	Result	Ref.
Mnet Asian Music Awards	2016	Best Dance Performance Solo	"Free Somebody"	Nominated	
Mnet Asian Music Awards	2016	Song of the Year	"Free Somebody"	Nominated	
SBS Entertainment Awards	2010	New Star Award	Star King	Won	

== See also ==
- Korean culture in New York City
- Koreans in New York City
