= David Cho (journalist) =

American journalist and editor

- Education: Juilliard School; Yale University; Columbia University
- Occupation: Journalist
- Years active: 1995-present
- Employer: Barron's
- Awards: Pulitzer Prize for Public Service (2014); Gerald Loeb Awards (2020 and 2021)

David Dae-Hyun Cho is an American journalist. He is the editor in chief of CNBC, having previously been the editor in chief of Barron's, and the business editor at The Washington Post.

== Early life and education ==
Cho was educated at the Juilliard School of Music in New York, where he studied piano, before receiving a BA in English Language and Literature from Yale in 1995. He then received three graduate degrees from Columbia University including an MA in Journalism, an MA in International Affairs and an MBA from the business school.

== Career ==
Cho started his career as a staff writer for The Korean Herald in 1995 until he took an internship at The New York Times in 1997. After his internship, Cho joined The Philadelphia Inquirer as a staff writer before assuming the same role at The Star-Ledger in 1999, where he was a member of the team that was a Pulitzer Prize finalist in breaking news for its coverage of a deadly dorm fire at Seton Hall University. He moved to The Washington Post in 2001 and was a 2005-06 Knight-Bagehot fellow.

Cho's work covering the 2008 financial crisis drew attention. He won the Best of Knight-Bagehot Business Journalism Award for his coverage of events leading to the Crisis. His coverage of the 2008 financial crisis was also chosen by the Columbia School of Journalism as one of its "100 Great Stories" of the last century. Cho was the primary editor over a series about flawed medical research that won the George Polk Award for Medical Reporting. He was a member of the Washington Post team that won the 2014 Pulitzer Prize for Public Service and contributed to the Washington Post's Pulitzer Prize-winning coverage of the Virginia Tech massacre. Cho was named business editor in 2016. As business editor, Cho expanded the staff of the department significantly and established a technology team in San Francisco. Under his leadership, The Post's business staff won four Gerald E. Loeb awards in the span of two years.

In April 2021, Cho was named editor in chief of Barron's, just as the publication was celebrating its 100th year. In January of the following year, it reached 20 million unique readers, including Apple News, a record for the publication. Between 2022 and 2024, the publication was a SABEW finalist five times and won five SABEW awards, including for General Excellence in 2024. In 2024, the Association of Foreign Press Correspondents named Cho as a winner of its Professional Excellence Award.

In 2023, Cho was named the head of editorial content for Dow Jones Wealth and Investing, overseeing the journalism for MarketWatch, Investors Business Daily and Financial News London, while retaining his leadership of Barron's. In early 2025, he was elected as the president of the Dow Jones News Fund, becoming its ninth president in its 67-year history.

In August 2025, Cho became the editor in chief of CNBC, overseeing both its digital and television operations.

== Personal life ==
Cho married on December 30, 2001. He and his wife have two sons. Cho's mother is a Methodist pastor and his father is the owner and founder of Netlinc Technologies, a company that manufactured telecommunications hardware in New Jersey.
