= David Cho (Secret Service) =

Head of Joe Biden's security detail

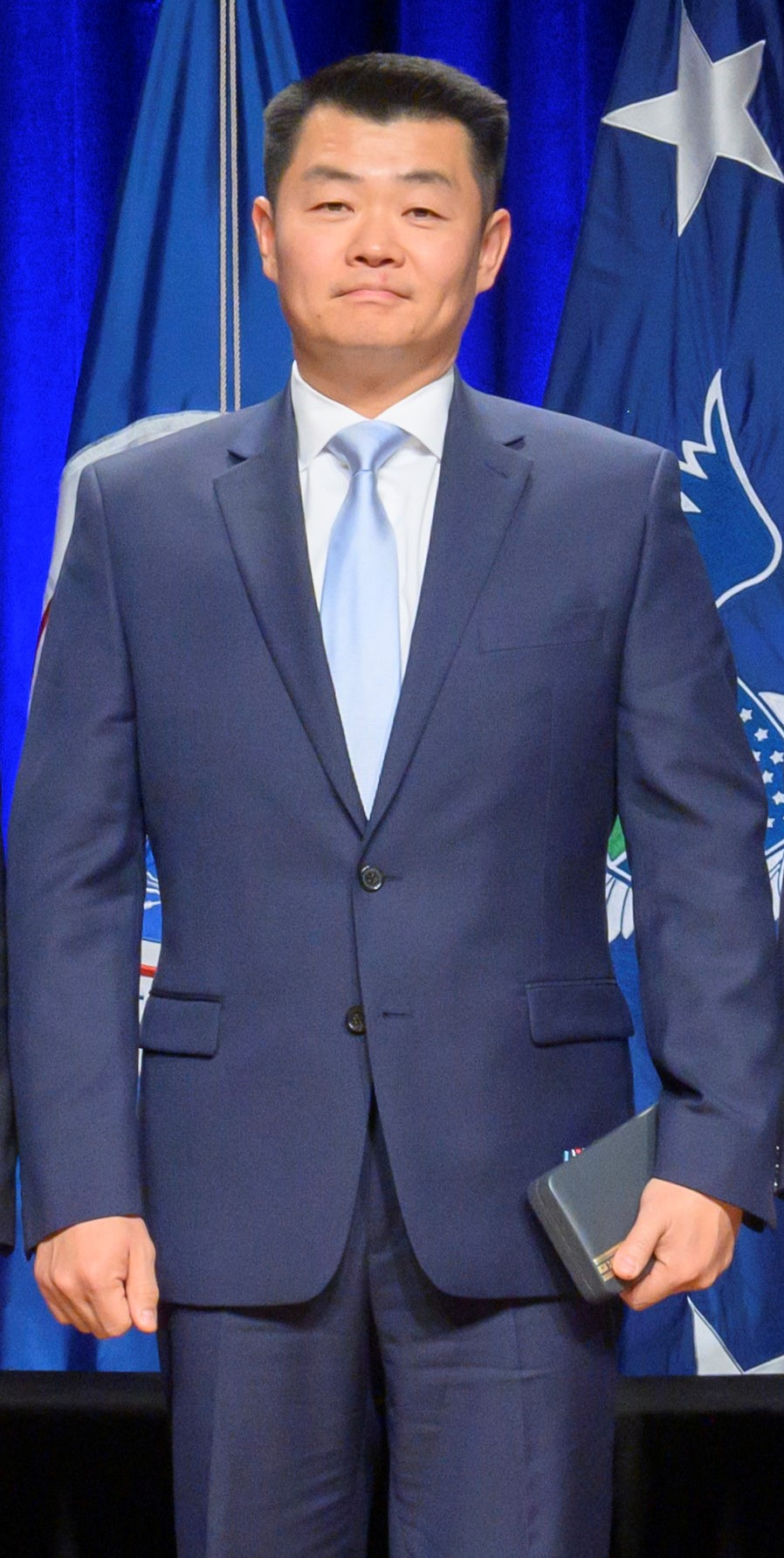
- Cho pictured in 2019.
- Citizenship: United States
- Occupation: Deputy Head of Security for Citadel LLC's
- Employer: Citadel LLC

David Cho is an American security officer and former U.S. Secret Service agent who was the Special Agent In Charge of the Presidential Protective Division detail for U.S. President Joe Biden. Prior to the Biden Administration, Cho served as leader of the Presidential Protective Division detail for President Donald Trump.

During the Trump Administration, Cho was second in-command of the protective detail. He became the first South Korean-American Special Agent In Charge of a president's Secret Service detail in January 2021. Cho was appointed head of Biden's security detail after several agents were removed from Biden's detail over concerns of loyalty to Biden's political rival, Trump.

Known among colleagues as a "perfectionist supervisor," he rose through the ranks to become second-in-command of the Presidential Protective Division during the Trump administration. Cho served with the Secret Service for more than 25 years before his retirement.

In January 2022 Cho started working as deputy head of security for Citadel LLC.

== Career ==
In 2019, Cho received the "Exceptional Service Medal" from the Secretary of Homeland Security. He was recognized for negotiating with North Korean officials for arranging security for Trump for both summits with Kim Jong Un, specifically, "for tireless and direct participation in high-level negotiations with the leaders of the Democratic People's Republic of Korea, planning all security details for both Presidential visits to that country, while simultaneously leading the men and women of the Presidential Protective Division at the White House."

Cho appeared at the Inauguration of Joe Biden as the head of Biden's Secret Service detail and previously appeared at multiple events alongside Trump. In the wake of the inauguration, Cho's leadership of the Presidential Protective Division was praised by observers as demonstrating the inclusion of racial minorities in sensitive U.S. government positions.

However, throughout the inauguration, many far-right conspiracy theorists falsely accused Cho of being a "Chinese handler" due to his race and Cho's proximity to Biden throughout the Inauguration. Per Secret Service practice, the head of the Presidential Protective Division maintains close proximity to the President at all times – including travelling in the front passenger seat of the presidential limousine and with the President on Marine One and Air Force One during all domestic and foreign trips.

On December 9, 2021, it was announced that Cho would be retiring from the Secret Service to take a job with Citadel, billionaire Kenneth C. Griffin’s $43 billion hedge fund. Cho started as Citadel LLC's deputy head of security on January 3, 2022.

== See also ==
- United States Secret Service
