= Kim Yoon-ji =

South Korean actress (born 1988)

- 김윤지
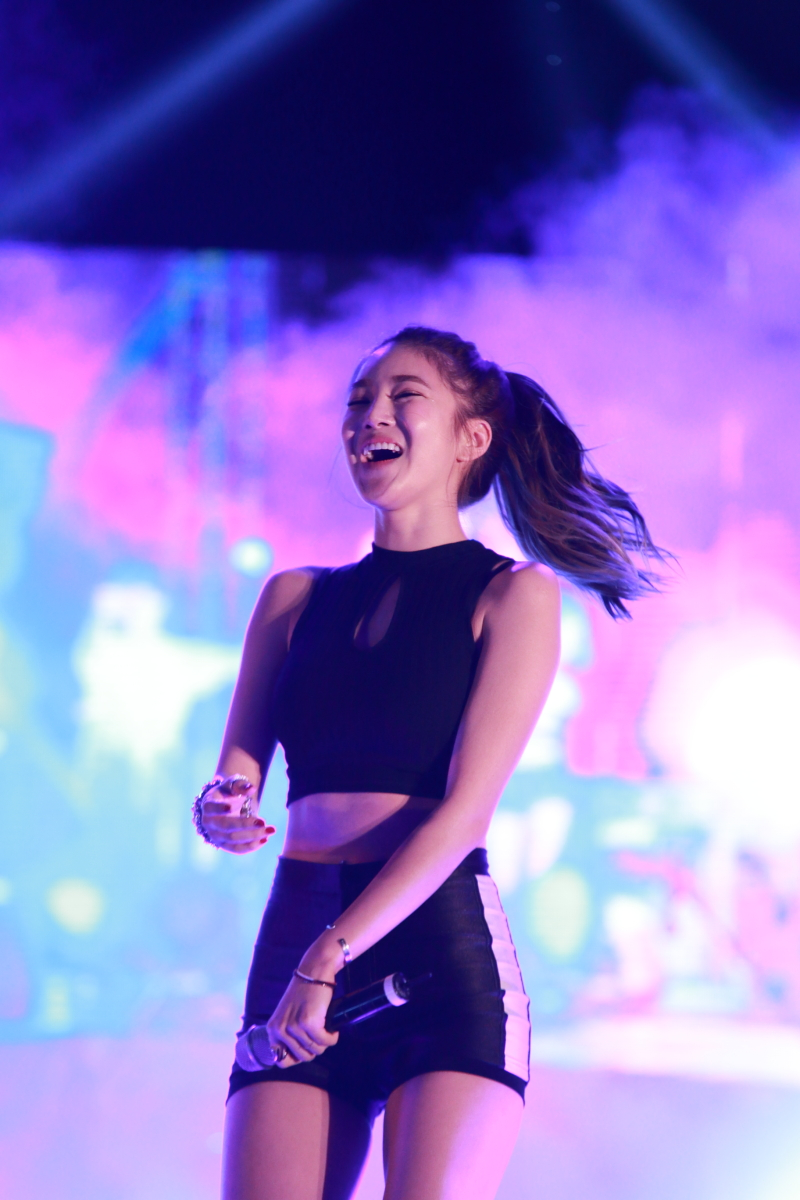
- Kim in 2017
- Born: Christine Kim; September 6, 1988 (age 38); Seoul, South Korea
- Occupations: Actress; singer
- Years active: 2009–present
- Agent: Sublime
- Spouse: Choi Woo-sung (m. 2021)
- Children: 1
- Relatives: Kang Ji-young (cousin)
- Musical career
- Also known as: NS Yoon-G
- Genres: K-pop; R&B; dance
- Instrument: Vocals
- Years active: 2009–2018
- Label: JTM

Korean name
- Hangul: 김윤지
- RR: Gim Yunji
- MR: Kim Yunji

Kim Yoon-ji (Korean: 김윤지; born Christine Kim) is a South Korean actress and former singer. She performs under the stage name NS Yoon-G (NS윤지) and debuted in 2009 with the digital single "Head Hurts" under JTM Entertainment. The "NS" in her name initially stood for "New Spirit", but was later changed to "New Star". Kim used her Korean name as a part of her stage name as she found "Christine" too difficult for Korean people to pronounce.

== Early life ==
Kim was born in Seoul, South Korea on September 6, 1988, and moved to the San Fernando Valley in California in the 4th grade. She entered UCLA, majoring in Dance and Communication, but took a leave of absence after a year to pursue her career in entertainment in South Korea. After initially joining DSP Media as a trainee, she debuted with JTM Entertainment with a single "Head Hurts".

Kim's cousin is Kara member Kang Ji-young; she also has a younger brother.

== Career ==
She recorded the English version of "You Make Me Happy" for Fresh Pretty Cure! around 2009.

On November 1, 2012, Kim released a digital single, "If You Love Me" featuring Jay Park, and released an official music video and a behind the scenes making film. Kim performed her singles on Korean music shows such as KBS' Music Bank, Mnet's M! Countdown, MBC's Music Core and SBS' Inkigayo, alongside Jay Park who was occasionally replaced by Dalmatian's Simon.

Also in November 2012, Kim became the host of K-pop Tasty Road with U-KISS's Eli Kim, which combined the Korean Wave and food into one show.

In January 2013, Kim performed in Ho Chi Minh City alongside Adam Lambert and Aurea.

On November 23, 2018, it was announced that NS Yoon-G had changed her stage name to Kim Yoon-ji as she will be promoted as an actress.

In 2021, Kim announced she was re-releasing her 2012 single "If You Love Me" featuring Joohoney, replacing Jay Park's original feature on the song.

On December 3, 2021, it was reported that Kim had signed with Sublime Artist Agency, who later confirmed that the contract was officially signed.

In 2021, Kim, along with her husband, Choi Woo-sung, joined the variety show Same Bed, Different Dreams 2 for episodes 220 to 238, and also featured in episode 258.

Kim was cast in Netflix's comic heist film Lift starring American comedian Kevin Hart. Originally slated to release in August 2023, it was delayed to 12 January 2024.

== Personal life ==
Kim began dating musician Chancellor in March 2015 while working on music together. They had met two years prior to the relationship. The couple became estranged due to their conflicting schedules and ended their relationship in August 2017.

In September 2021, Kim married Choi Woo-sung, her childhood friend, first boyfriend, and a businessman. He is the son of comedian Lee Sang-hae, her late father's best friend, and singer Kim Young-im. They reunited as adults after having parted amicably as teenagers because they assumed that their fathers might object to their relationship. On April 23, 2024, Sublime confirmed that Kim was pregnant after three years of marriage. Kim gave birth to a daughter named Ella on July 7.

== Discography ==
=== Extended plays ===
Title	Album details	Peak chart positions	Sales
Title	Album details	KOR	Sales
Neo Spirit	Released: January 5, 2012; Label: JTM Entertainment, Sony Music Korea; Format: CD, digital download	15	KOR: 3,700+
Skinship	Released: July 18, 2012; Label: JTM Entertainment, Sony Music Korea; Format: CD, digital download	6	KOR: 1,493
The Way 2..	Released: April 1, 2014; Label: JTM Entertainment, LOEN Entertainment; Format: CD, digital download	7	KOR: 6,871

=== Single albums ===
Title	Album details	Peak positions
Title	Album details	KOR
Ambitious	Released: May 14, 2010; Label: JTM Entertainment, Sony Music Korea; Format: CD, digital download	31
Time To Fly High	Released: October 21, 2010; Label: JTM Entertainment, Sony Music Korea; Format: CD, digital download	85
Sincerely,	Released: March 20, 2015; Label: JTM Entertainment, LOEN Entertainment; Format: CD, digital download	7

=== Singles ===
==== As lead artist ====
Title	Year	Peak chart positions		Album
Title	Year	KOR Gaon	KOR Billboard	Album
"My Head Hurts" (머리 아파)	2009	—	—	Ambitious
"Don't Go Back"	2010	173	—	Ambitious
"Just Dance"	2010	99	—	Time To Fly High
"Talk Talk Talk"	2011	31	—	Neo Spirit
"Miss You Again" (또 보고 싶어) (feat. Sangchu)	2011	36	—	Neo Spirit
"What Do You Know" (니가 뭘 알아) (feat. Verbal Jint)	2011	34	36	Neo Spirit
"The Reason I Became A Witch" (마녀가 된 이유)	2012	36	46	Neo Spirit
"I Got You"	2012	43	49	Skinship
"If You Love Me" (feat. Jay Park)	2012	16	18	The Way 2..
"Yasisi"	2014	17	20	The Way 2..
"Fluttered Feelings" (설렘주의) (with Giriboy)	2014	6	—	My Romance (single)
"A Snowy Day" (눈이 오는 날엔) (feat. DinDin)	2014	70	—	Non-album singles
"Wifey" (feat. MC Mong)	2015	60	—	Sincerely
"Honey Summer"	2015	26	—	Non-album singles
"If You Love Me" (feat. Joohoney)	2021	64	—	Non-album singles
"—" denotes releases that did not chart or were not released in that region.

==== As featured artist ====
Title	Year	Peak chart positions	Album
Title	Year	KOR	Album
"Blast" (Scarnite featuring NS Yoon-G)	2014	—	Non-album singles
"Insomnia" (Humming Urban Stereo featuring NS Yoon-G)	2014	—	Reform
"—" denotes releases that did not chart or were not released in that region.

== Videography ==
=== Music videos ===
List of music videos, showing year released and director
Title	Year	Director(s)	Ref.
"My Head Hurts"	2009	Unknown	
"Don't Go Back"	2010	Unknown	
"Just Dance"	2010	Unknown	
"Talk Talk Talk"	2011	Unknown	
"Miss You Again"	2011	Unknown	
"The Reason I Became A Witch"	2012	Mun Seung-jae	
"I Got You"	2012	Mun Seung-jae	
"If You Love Me"	2012	Mun Seung-jae	
"Yasisi"	2014	Unknown	
"Wifey"	2015	Unknown	
"Honey Summer"	2015		

=== Music video appearances ===
Year	Song title	Artist
2010	"Calling You"	Norazo
2011	"You Look Good"	Verbal Jint
2013	"Tears"	Leessang ft. Eugene
2013	"Cheap Ring"	Youme
2013	"Would You?"	Swings ft. Seo In-guk
2015	"Vanilla Shake"	NC.A

== Filmography ==
=== Film ===
Year	Title	Role	Notes	Ref.
2020	Welcome Guest House	Ji-ho		
2024	Lift	Mi-sun	Credited as Yun Jee Kim	

=== Television series ===
Year	Title	Role	Notes	Ref.
2018	The Last Empress	Hyun-joo		
2021	Dramaworld	Detective	Season 2	
2021	Mine	Jasmin		
2024	Red Swan	Seo Ji-yeon		

=== Television shows ===
Year	Title	Role	Notes	Ref.
2011	2011 Idol Star Athletics Championships	Team L		
2012	K-pop Tasty Road	Host	with U-KISS's Eli Kim	
2014	Crime Scene	Cast member	Season 1	
2021	Same Bed, Different Dreams 2	Cast member	Episode 220–238, 258	

== Theater ==
Year	Title	Role	Venue	Ref.
2022	Beginning	Laura	Sejong Center	
