= Tahiti (group) =

South Korean girl group

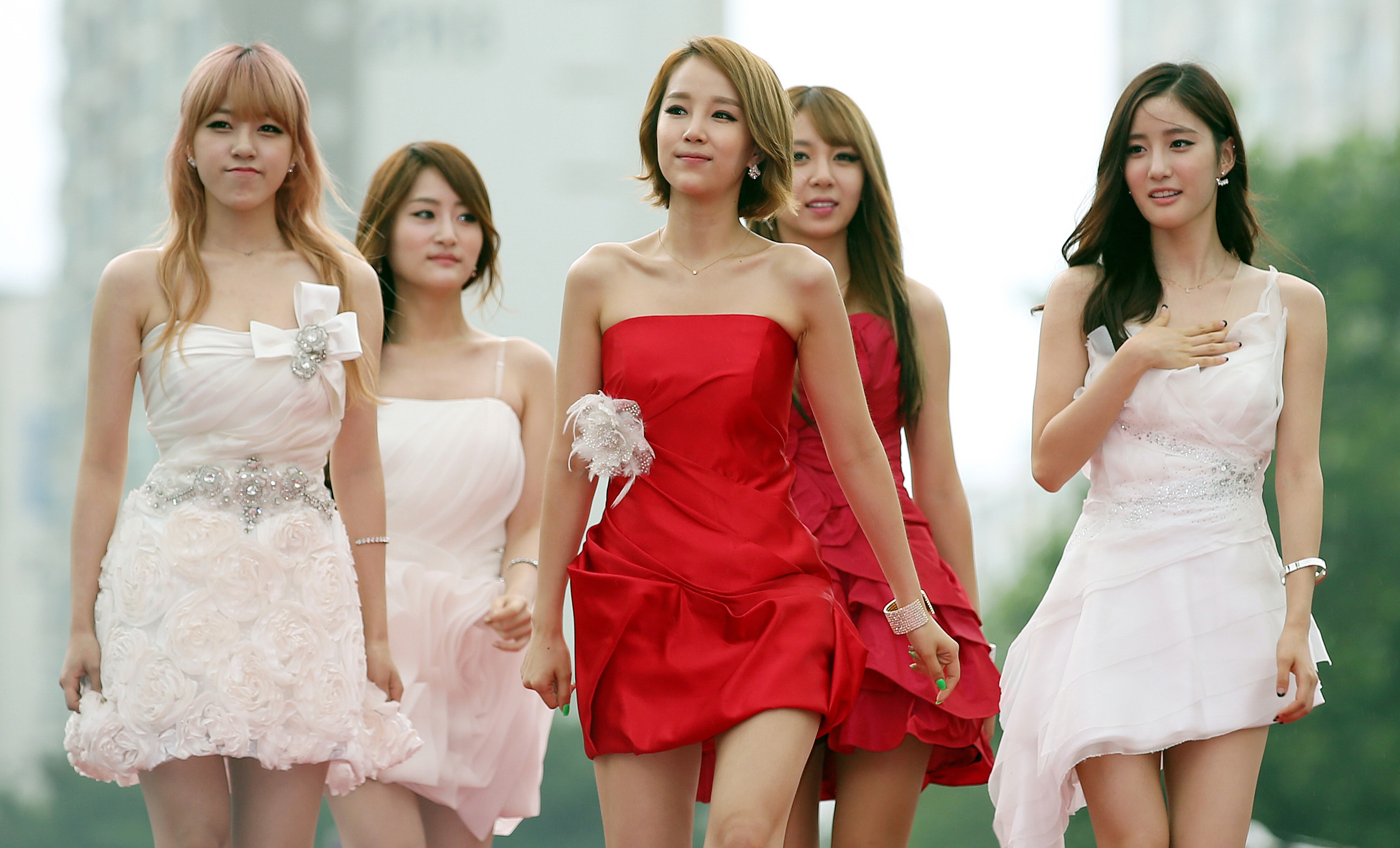
- Tahiti members arrive at the red carpet event of the Pifan in Bucheon on July 17, 2014

Background information
- Origin: South Korea
- Genre: K-pop
- Years active: 2012–2018
- Labels: JLine Entertainment; Vitamin Entertainment
- Past members: EJ; Keezy; Ye Eun; Jung Bin; Jin; Jisoo; Miso; Min Jae; Jerry; Ari
- Website: dreamstar.co.kr/tahiti_home

Tahiti (Korean: 타히티; stylized in all caps) was a South Korean four-member girl group formed by Dream Star Entertainment in 2012. The group debuted on July 23, 2012, with the single "Tonight". Their fanclub name is "Black Pearl". Tahiti officially disbanded on July 25, 2018.

== History ==
=== Pre-debut ===
Prior to debuting, Tahiti launched a sitcom-style reality program called Ta-Dah! It's Tahiti with their original line-up. The show began broadcasting on April 14, 2012 and was picked up by television stations in South Korea, China, Japan, Taiwan, Malaysia, Indonesia, the Philippines and Singapore.

Following the ending of Ta-Dah! It's Tahiti, it was announced that Ari and Hanhee had left the group and would be replaced by Ye Eun and Keezy.

=== 2012: Debut, line-up change, Hasta Luego and Pretty Face ===
On July 23, 2012, Tahiti released their debut single "Tonight". Promotions for the single began on July 25, 2012, on Show Champion.

In October, Tahiti unveiled teaser videos and images of their upcoming single "Hasta Luego", which revealed that Ye Eun, Keezy, and EJ were no longer with the group. The three members were replaced with Jinhee, Miso, and Ari, the latter of which had left the group prior to their debut. Ye Eun and Keezy redebuted in 2015 as the R&B duo "Verry", under the names Sina and Soma, respectively. Keezy has also released a solo album entitled "Somablu". On October 31, 2012, the group released the single "Hasta Luego", which was followed up with the release of "Pretty Face" on December 2, 2012.

=== 2013: Promotions in Philippines, Five Beats of Hearts and Jin's absence ===
On January 19, 2013, Tahiti performed at the SM Mall of Asia Open Grounds in the Philippines, where they performed with Girls' Generation, Exo, U-KISS, Infinite and Tasty. This concert marked Tahiti's first time performing overseas. Tahiti also appeared on Philippine Late night show Gandang Gabi Vice as Guest. They also appeared on Philippine music show ASAP and TV show It's Showtime.

On March 11, 2013, Tahiti released the OST track "Don't Know, Don't Know" for the South Korean television series You Are the Best!, where they also made a cameo appearance.

Only July 23, 2013, Tahiti celebrated their one-year anniversary and upcoming mini-album release by holding a showcase. The group released their first mini-album, Five Beats of Hearts, with the accompanying music video to "Love Sick", on July 25, 2013. Jin did not participate in the music video or live performances of "Love Sick" due to the sexual nature of concept as she was a minor.

=== 2014: Line-up changes and "Oppa, You're Mine" ===
Dream Star Entertainment announced on June 4, 2014, that Jungbin would not be participating in Tahiti's upcoming promotions due to health issues. The company did not confirm if her absence will be temporary or permanent.

On June 10, 2014, Tahiti announced the release of their third single "Oppa, You're Mine" through a music video teaser. The teaser showcased a new member to the group, Jerry. The music video was released the following day.

=== 2015: Fall Into Temptation, Japanese debut and "Skip" ===
On January 4, 2015, Tahiti announced the release of the second mini album "Fall Into Temptation" through a teaser clip. Jungbin and Jin did not participate in this comeback either, and their official Twitter accounts were inactive, leading fans to presume that they had left the group, although the company never made a formal statement regarding the matter. On March 12, Tahiti released their first mini album in Japan.

On November 8, 2015, Tahiti made a comeback with a "cute" concept in their 4th single "Skip".

=== 2016–2018: Last activities, Jisoo's departure and disbandment ===
On May 23, 2016, they released their 5th single "I Want To Know Your Mind" (알쏭달쏭).

On March 16, 2017, Jisoo revealed she had been diagnosed with depression and a panic disorder and on December 8 of the same year, announced she was leaving the group.

On July 25, 2018, it was announced by member Jerry that Tahiti had disbanded.

== Members ==
=== Former members ===
- Miso (미소)
- Minjae (민재)
- Jerry (제리)
- Jungbin (정빈)
- EJ (이제이)
- Keezy (키지)
- Ari (아리)
- Yeeun (예은)
- Jin (진)
- Jisoo (지수)

== Discography ==
=== Extended plays ===
Title	Album details	Peak chart positions	Sales
Title	Album details	KOR	Sales
Five Beats of Hearts	Released: July 25, 2013; Label: Dream Star Entertainment; Format: CD, digital download	10	KOR: 2,031
Fall Into Temptation	Released: January 13, 2015; Label: Dream Star Entertainment; Format: CD, digital download	9	KOR: 1,227; JPN: 3,208
"—" denotes releases that did not chart or were not released in that region.

=== Singles ===
Title	Year	Peak chart positions		Sales	Album
Title	Year	KOR	KOR Hot 100	Sales	Album
"Tonight"	2012	102	—	—N/a	Five Beats of Hearts
"Hasta Luego"	2012	198	—	—N/a	Five Beats of Hearts
"Love Sick"	2013	70	56	—N/a	Five Beats of Hearts
"Oppa, You're Mine" (오빤 내꺼)	2014	110	—	—N/a	Fall Into Temptation
"Phone Number"	2015	—	—	—N/a	Fall Into Temptation
"Skip"	2015	282	—	KOR: 5,076+	Skip
"I Want To Know Your Mind" (알쏭달쏭)	2016	371	—	KOR: 3,614+	S-The Secret
"—" denotes releases that did not chart or were not released in that region.

=== Original Soundtracks ===
Title	Year	Peak chart positions		Sales	Album
Title	Year	KOR	KOR Hot 100	Sales	Album
"Do not know" (몰라몰라)	2013	—	—	—N/a	You Are the Best! OST
"It'll be great." (참 좋을거야)	2015	—	—	—N/a	Way To Go, Rose OST
"My Prince"	2016	—	—	—N/a	The Dearest Lady OST
"—" denotes releases that did not chart or were not released in that region.
