= Dal Shabet discography =

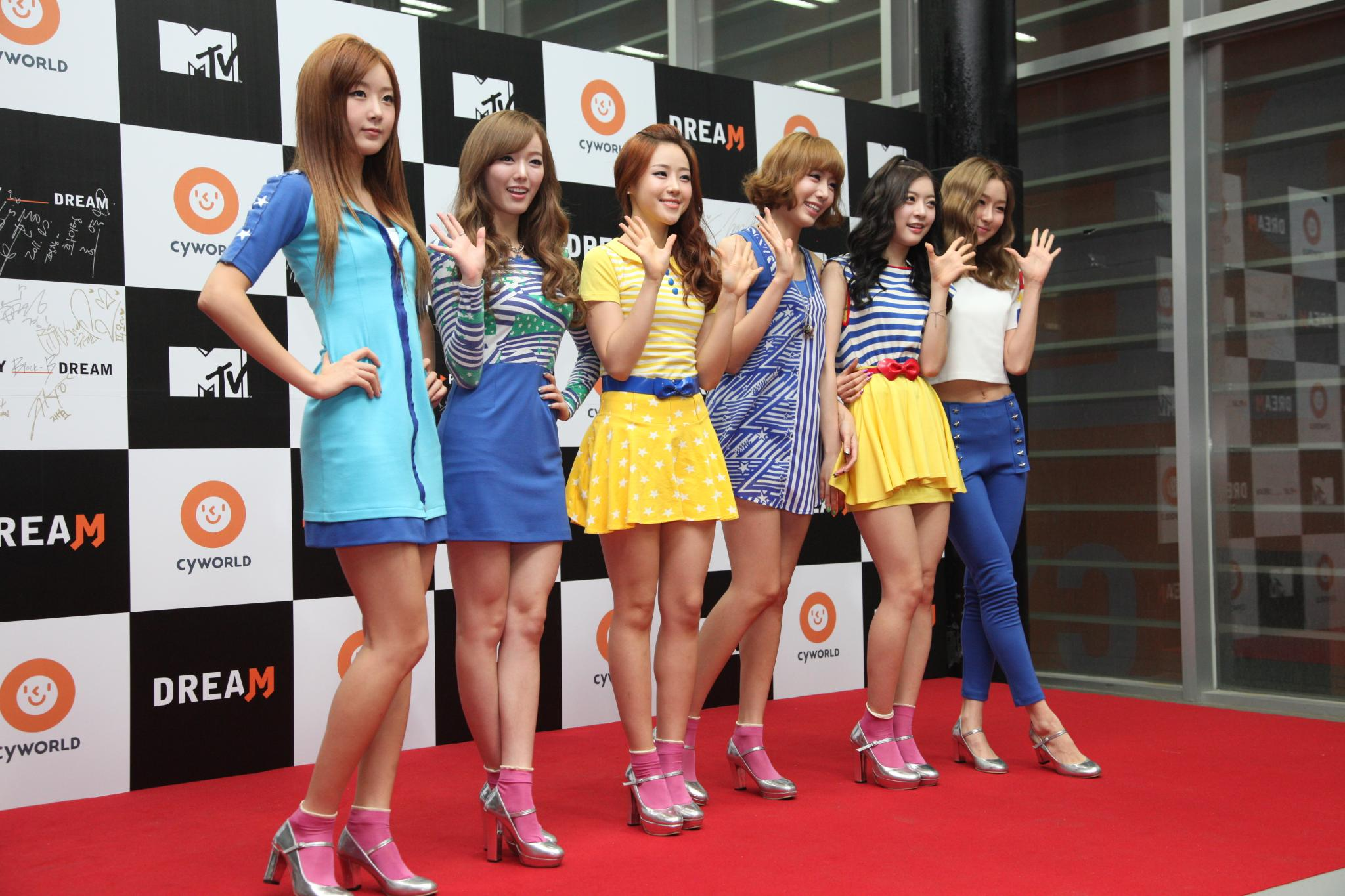
- Dal Shabet at the Cyworld Dream Music Festival, July 23, 2011
- Studio albums: 1
- Extended plays: 10
- Soundtrack albums: 5
- Compilation albums: 1
- Music videos: 15
- Promotional singles: 11
- Collaborations: 5

The discography of the South Korean girl group Dal Shabet consist of one studio album, one compilation album, ten extended plays, five soundtrack appearances, five collaborations, fifteen music videos and nine promotional singles.

== Albums ==
=== Studio albums ===
List of studio albums, with selected details, chart positions, and sales
Title	Album details	Peak chart positions	Sales
Title	Album details	KOR	Sales
Bang Bang	Released: June 6, 2012 (KOR); Label: Happy Face Entertainment; Formats: CD, digital download	7	KOR: 4,775+
"—" denotes releases that did not chart or were not released in that region.

=== Compilation albums ===
List of compilation albums, with selected details, chart positions, and sales
Title	Album details	Peak chart positions	Sales
Title	Album details	JPN	Sales
The Best	Released: November 4, 2015 (JPN); Format: CD, DVD, photobook	—	JPN: 1,088+

== Extended plays ==
List of extended plays, with selected details, chart positions, and sales
Title	Details	Peak chart positions	Sales
Title	Details	KOR	Sales
Supa Dupa Diva	Released: January 3, 2011 (KOR); Label: Happy Face Entertainment; Formats: CD, digital download	9	KOR: 4,132+
Pink Rocket	Released: April 14, 2011 (KOR); Label: Happy Face Entertainment; Formats: CD, digital download	7	KOR: 4,077+
Bling Bling	Released: August 11, 2011 (KOR); Label: Happy Face Entertainment; Formats: CD, digital download	55	KOR: 3,609+
Hit U	Released: January 26, 2012 (KOR); Label: Happy Face Entertainment; Formats: CD, digital download	1	KOR: 11,173+
Have, Don't Have	Released: November 13, 2012 (KOR); Label: Happy Face Entertainment; Formats: CD, digital download	5	KOR: 3,765+
Be Ambitious	Released: June 20, 2013 (KOR); Label: Happy Face Entertainment; Formats: CD, digital download	10	KOR: 3,239+
B.B.B	Released: January 8, 2014 (KOR); Label: Happy Face Entertainment; Formats: CD, digital download	4	KOR: 5,450+
Joker Is Alive	Released: April 15, 2015 (KOR); Label: Happy Face Entertainment; Formats: CD, digital download	8	KOR: 4,786+
Naturalness	Released: January 5, 2016 (KOR); Label: Happy Face Entertainment; Formats: CD, digital download	10	KOR: 3,944+
Fri. Sat. Sun	Released: September 29, 2016 (KOR); Label: Happy Face Entertainment; Formats: CD, digital download	12	KOR: 3,610+
"—" denotes releases that did not chart or were not released in that region.

== Singles ==
List of singles, with selected chart positions, showing year released, sales, and album name
Title	Year	Peak chart positions				Sales (DL)	Album
Title	Year	KOR	KOR Hot	JPN	US World	Sales (DL)	Album
"Supa Dupa Diva"	2011	18	—	—	—	KOR: 1,289,763	Supa Dupa Diva
"Pink Rocket"	2011	17	—	—	—	KOR: 654,911	Pink Rocket
"Bling Bling"	2011	9	19	—	—	KOR: 1,318,918	Bling Bling
"Hit U"	2012	12	17	—	—	KOR: 1,574,267	Hit U
"Mr. BangBang"	2012	19	23	—	—	KOR: 735,758	Bang Bang
"Have, Don't Have"	2012	22	19	—	—	KOR: 655,885	Have, Don't Have
"Be Ambitious (Look At My Legs)"	2013	14	12	—	—	KOR: 400,962	Be Ambitious
"B.B.B (Big Baby Baby)"	2014	15	15	—	—	KOR: 349,825	B.B.B
"Joker"	2015	20	—	—	—	KOR: 142,274	Joker Is Alive
"Hard 2 Love"	2015	—	—	36	—	JPN: 8,369 (Phy.)	Non-album single
"Someone Like U"	2016	89	—	—	18	KOR: 47,159	Naturalness
"Fri. Sat. Sun"	2016	118	—	—	—	KOR: 12,279	Fri. Sat. Sun
"—" denotes releases that did not chart or were not released in that region.

== Collaborations ==
Title	Year	Members	Other artist(s)	Album
"Win the Day"	2012	Woohee & GaEun	2PM, 4Minute, MBLAQ, Miss A, Nine Muses, Sistar, ZE:A & B1A4	Non-album release
"Rockin' Around the Christmas Tree"	2014	All	MINX	Non-album release

== Soundtracks ==
Title	Year	Members	Album
"Turn Your Head"	2011	Serri & Subin	God's Quiz 2 OST
"It's You"	2013	All	All About My Romance OST

== Videography ==
=== Music videos ===
Title	Year	Director(s)	Ref.
"Supa Dupa Diva"	2011	Dari Cho	
"Pink Rocket"	2011	Lee Ki-baek	
"Turn Your Head"	2011	Unknown	
"Bling Bling"	2011	Lee Ki-baek	
"Christmas Time"	2011	Unknown	
"Hit U"	2012	Hong Won-ki	
"Mr. BangBang"	2012	Hong Won-ki	
"Have, Don't Have (Have Ver.)"	2012	Son Dong-rag, Jung Teok-gwa, Kwae Nam-deul	
"Have, Don't Have (Don't Have Ver.)"	2012	Son Dong-rag, Jung Teok-gwa, Kwae Nam-deul	
"For Darling"	2012	Unknown	
"Be Ambitious"	2013	Moon Min-ju	
"B.B.B (Big Baby Baby)"	2014	Dari Cho	
"Joker"	2015	Song In-ho	
"Someone Like U"	2016	Cho So-young (Dari)	
"FRI. SAT. SUN"	2016	Yoo Sung-kyun	
