= Vicky =

Vicky, Vick, Vickie or Vicki is a feminine given name. It is often short for Victoria. The name Vicky in Greece comes from the name Vasiliki.

== Notable people with the name ==
- Family nickname of Victoria, Princess Royal (1840–1901), wife of German Emperor Frederick III, mother of Emperor Wilhelm II and daughter of Queen Victoria of Great Britain
- Pen name of German-British political cartoonist Victor Weisz (1913–1966)
- Vicki Adams (born 1989), Scottish curler
- Vicki Adams (trick rider) (born 1951), Rodeo performer
- Vicki Barr (athlete) (born 1982), British sprinter
- Vicky Beeching (born 1979), British musician and religious commentator
- Vicki Belo (born 1956), Filipino cosmetic surgeon
- Vicki Berner (1945–2017), Canadian tennis player
- Vicky Binns (born 1981), English actress
- Vicky Botwright (born 1977), English squash coach and former player
- Vicky Brago-Mitchell (born 1946), American fractal artist, former dancer
- Vicki Brown (1940–1991), English singer
- Vicky Bullett (born 1967), American former professional basketball player
- Vicky Burky (born 1964), Indonesian former soap opera actress and aerobic instructor
- Vicki Butler-Henderson (born 1972), British racing driver
- Vicki Cardwell (born 1955), Australian retired squash player
- Vickie Chapman (born 1957), Australian politician and lawyer
- Vicki Cruse (1967–2009), American aerobatic pilot and administrator
- Vicky Darling (born 1966), Australian politician
- Vickie Deblieux (1956–1994), American murder victim
- Vicky Entwistle (born 1968), English actress
- Vicky Exley (born 1975), English former footballer
- Vicky Ford (born 1967), British politician
- Vicky Foxcroft (born 1977), British politician
- Vicky Galindo (born 1983), American softball player
- Vickie Gates (actress), British actress
- Vickie Guerrero (born 1968), American professional wrestling personality
- Vicky Hartzler (born 1960), American politician
- Vicky Hadjivassiliou (born 1971), Greek author and politician
- Vicky Holland (born 1986), English triathlete
- Vicky Hurst (born 1990), American golfer
- Vicki Jensen, American politician
- Vicky Jenson (born 1960), American film director
- Vickie Johnson (born 1972), American former basketball player
- Vicky Kanai, Palauan politician
- Vicky Kaya (born 1978), Greek model and television presenter
- Vicky Kippin (1942–2019), Australian politician
- Vicky Knight, English film actress
- Vicky Lau, Hong Kong chef
- Vicki Lawrence (born 1949), American actress, comedian and singer
- Vicky Leandros (born 1949), stage name of Greek-German singer Vassiliki Papathanasiou
- Vicki Lester (1915–2001), American actress
- Vicky Losada (born 1991), Spanish footballer
- Vicky Lupton (born 1972), British retired race walker
- Vicky Maeijer (born 1986), Dutch politician
- Vicky McClure (born 1983), English actress
- Vickie McDonald (born 1947), American politician from Nebraska
- Vicky McGehee (fl. 1997–present), American country music songwriter
- Vicky Morales (born 1969), Filipino newscaster
- Vicky Moscholiou (1943–2005), Greek singer
- Vickie Natale (born 1980), American singer
- Vicki Nelson-Dunbar (born 1962), American former tennis player
- Vickie Orr (born 1967), American retired basketball player
- Vickie Panos (1920–1986), Canadian baseball player
- Vicky Parnov (born 1990), Australian pole vaulter
- Vicky Peretz (1953–2021), Israeli association football player and manager
- Vicki Peterson (born 1958), American rock musician
- Vicky Phelan (1974–2022), Irish healthcare campaigner
- Vicky Pryce (born 1952), Greek-born British economist
- Vicky R (born 1996), Gabonese rapper and singer
- Vickie Roach (born 1958), Aboriginal Australian activist
- Vicky Holst Rasmussen (born 1977), Danish politician
- Vicki Schmidt (born 1955), American politician
- Vicky Theodoridou (born 1982), Greek handball player
- Vicky Vanita (1948–2007), Greek actress
- Vicki Van Meter (1982–2008), American aviator
- Vicky Varun (born 1990), Indian actor
- Vicky Vette (born 1965), Norwegian-Canadian pornographic actress, webcam model and webmaster
- Vicky Victory, stage name of American female professional wrestler Peach Janae, one of The Cheerleaders from the Gorgeous Ladies of Wrestling
- Vicky Vilagos (born 1963), Canadian synchronized swimmer
- Vicki Ward (born 1969), Australian politician
- Vicky Ward (born 1969), British-born American author, investigative journalist, editor-at-large, and television commentator
- Vicki Wickham (born 1939), English talent manager, entertainment producer and songwriter
- Vicky Wilkinson (born 1983), English professional boxer
- Vickie Winans (born 1953), American gospel singer
- Vicky Wright (born 1993), Scottish curler
- Vicki Young (born c. 1971), British journalist

== Fictional characters ==
- Vicky Austin, a frequent character from books by Madeleine L'Engle
- Vicky, a character of the 2008 film Vicky Cristina Barcelona
- Victoria "Vicky" Bradford, a character on the TV sitcom Three's a Crowd
- Vicky Chu, a main character in Dead Rising 4
- Vicki Fowler, on the British soap opera EastEnders
- Vicky Hudson, on the American soap operas Another World and As the World Turns
- Vicki Vale, a DC Comics character
- Vicki (Doctor Who), on the BBC TV series Doctor Who
- Vicky (The Fairly OddParents), a character on the animated series The Fairly OddParents
- Vicky, the title character of Vicky the Viking, an animated series, and Vicky the Viking (film), a 2009 live action adaptation
- Vicky Hotchner, a character in the 1998 American science-fiction disaster movie Deep Impact
- Vicki Lawson, a character on the TV sitcom Small Wonder
- Vicky Wedge, a character in the novel series Zom-B
- Vicky, from the Papa Louie video games

== Other uses ==
- Vicki (1953 film), an American crime drama film noir
- Vicky, a 1959 Filipino drama film based on a comic by Mars Ravelo
- Slang for the computer game series Victoria (game)

== See also ==
- Vicci
- Vici (disambiguation)
- Vicky & Johnny, South Korean-Spanish series of animated shorts
- Victor (disambiguation)
- Viki (disambiguation)
- Vikki (disambiguation)
