= Viki (singer) =

South Korean singer and actress (born 1988)

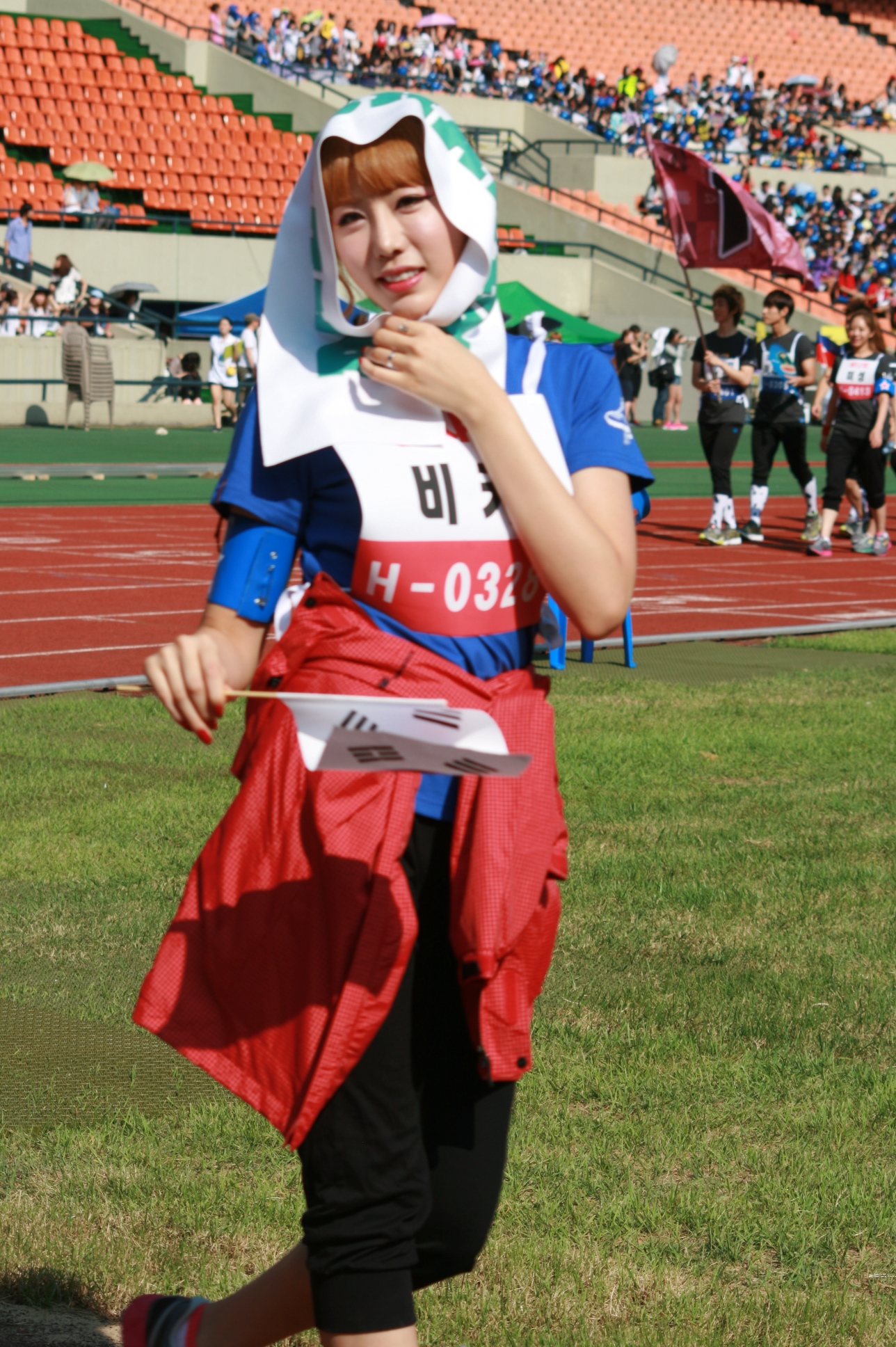
- Viki in 2011
- Born: Kang Eun-hye; March 28, 1988 (age 38); Seoul, South Korea
- Education: Dongduk Women's University
- Occupations: Singer; actress
- Years active: 2011–2015
- Musical career
- Genre: K-pop
- Instrument: Vocals
- Years active: 2011–2012
- Labels: Happy Face; MBK
- Formerly of: Dal Shabet

Korean name
- Hangul: 강은혜
- Hanja: 姜恩惠
- RR: Gang Eunhye
- MR: Kang Ŭnhye

Kang Eun-hye (Korean: 강은혜; born March 28, 1988), better known by her stage name Viki, or Baek Da-eun is a South Korean singer and actress. She is a former member of the South Korean girl group Dal Shabet.

== Personal life ==
Viki was born on 28 March 1988. She attended Dongduk Women's University and studied Bachelor of Music and Entertainment.

== Career ==
=== 2011–2012: Career beginnings ===
Viki made her debut through the release of Supa Dupa Diva with Dal Shabet on January 3, 2011. Promotions for "Supa Dupa Diva" began on January 6, 2011, on Mnet's M! Countdown.

However, in May 2012, it was announced that Viki would be leaving the group to continue her career as a solo artist. She was replaced by Bae Woo-hee.

=== 2014–present: Solo activities ===
After leaving the group, Viki made her film debut in 2014 in the film A Pharisee, Nice Sister-In-Law in 2015 and erotic films P.S. Girls and Challenge Game in 2016.

Viki signed with MBK Entertainment under her new name Baek Da-eun, but left the company in 2016.

After appearing in several erotic films, Viki revealed in 2015 that she was tricked by her acting agency to do said films. She later sued the agency and found out that the agency was operating illegally.

== Filmography ==
=== Film ===
Year	Title	Role	Note
2012	Wonderful Radio	Cobi Girl	Cameo
2014	A Pharisee	Eun-ji	
2015	Nice Sister-In-Law	Ha-yeong	
2016	P.S. Girls	Na-bi	
2016	Challenge Game	Lee Ae-ran	

=== Television drama ===
Year	Title	Role	Notes
2011	Dream High	Kirin student	Cameo
