= Viki =

Viki may refer to:

== People ==
- Viki Gabor (born 2007), Polish singer
- Viki Kahlon (born 1993), Israeli footballer
- Viki Miljković (born 1974), Serbian singer
- Viki Saha (born 1997), Indian cricketer
- Victor Weisskopf (1908–2002), Austrian-born American physicist known as Viki to colleagues
- Viki (singer), South Korean singer and actress Kang Eun-hye (born 1988)

== Other uses ==
- Viki (chimpanzee), the subject of one of the first experiments in ape language
- Viki (operetta), a Hungarian operetta composed by Pál Ábrahám
- Viki (streaming service), an American worldwide video streaming company
- Viki, Estonia, a village
- V.I.K.I. (Virtual Interactive Kinetic Intelligence), a character from the film I, Robot

== See also ==
- Vici (disambiguation)
- Vicki (disambiguation)
- Vicky (disambiguation)
- Vikki (disambiguation)
