= Be Ambitious =

Extended play by Dal Shabet

EP by Dal Shabet
- Released: June 20, 2013
- Recorded: 2012–2013
- Genres: Dance-pop; electropop
- Length: 21:17
- Language: Korean
- Labels: Happy Face; LOEN

Dal Shabet chronology
Have, Don't Have (2012)	Be Ambitious (2013)	B.B.B (2014)

Singles from Be Ambitious
- 1. "내 다리를 봐 (Be Ambitious)" Released: June 20, 2013

Be Ambitious is the sixth extended play by South Korean girl group Dal Shabet. The album was digitally and physically released on June 20, 2013. "내 다리를 봐 (Be Ambitious)" served as the promotional single. The track has two titles and translates to, "Look At My Legs (Be Ambitious)"

== Background ==
The release of Dal Shabet's album was announced on May 28, 2013. Happy Face Entertainment explained, "Dal Shabet are currently in the final stages of recording and production. This album is perfect for the sweltering summer. The concept has the girls baring a lot of skin, so they're currently in the process of working out. They'll show you a side of themselves you've never seen before." On June 2, 2013, it was confirmed by their agency that the group would be returning on June 20, 2013, with an album consisting of self-wrote and composed songs. On June 11 and 16, 2013, music video teasers for the title track were released to the public. On June 18, 2013, it was announced that the lyrics to "내 다리를 봐 (Be Ambitious)" were unfit for public broadcast due to sexual content and would have to be changed in order for the group to promote on television. Their company complied the same day and changed the lyrics in question. Two days later, the members of Dal Shabet attended a private showcase for the release of their album. While at the showcase, the members addressed their sexual content controversy, by stating, "Since the promotional track is called Look At My Legs (Be Ambitious) the album jacket and music video filming were all focused on our legs. We think that's why people are worried about it being too sexual. When the song is released, people will realize that's not true. We're going to become a sexy, but cute, Dal Shabet through this album." On June 20, 2013, Dal Shabet physically and digitally released their album, with an accompanying music video.

== Composition ==
The album is composed of seven tracks; six new songs and one instrumental. The promotional track was created by producers Nam Ki Sang and Lim Kwang-Wook. Nam Ki Sang has previously worked with Dal Shabet by creating their song "Love Shake" in 2012. This album marks the first time the members of Dal Shabet became actively involved with the production of their music. GaEun, Serri and Jiyul wrote lyrics for "Summer Break", "Let It Go" and "Hey Mr. Chu~♥", respectively. Producer DK$HINE, who previously made "Girl Girl Girls" for the group, lent his help once again in the production of "Hey Mr. Chu~♥". Woohee composed and wrote the lyrics for "How", which features narrations by Ahn Jae-hyun. 17HOLIC, who have created works for various K-Pop groups, lent their help throughout nearly the entire album.

== Promotion ==
On June 19, 2013, Dal Shabet held a comeback showcase for their fans. The showcase was used to reveal their title track to the Korean public for the first time. Televised promotions began on June 20, 2013, on Mnet's M! Countdown, where the group performed "Dalshabet Girls (Intro)" and "내 다리를 봐 (Be Ambitious)".

== Controversy ==
On July 1, 2013, men's rights group 'Man of Korea' filed an injunction to completely ban further distribution of "Be Ambitious". The group stated, "The lyrics and music video of "Be Ambitious" depreciate both women and men, and it's harmful to the youth. The music video also contains scenes that depreciate the 600,000 soldiers that are working hard in their enlistment." On July 11, 2013, Happy Face Entertainment and 'Man of Korea' held a joint conference, where they discussed the lawsuit. Following the conference, 'Man of Korea' officially announced they would be dropping their lawsuit against Dal Shabet's "Be Ambitious". Happy Face Entertainment stated, "There was no intention to depreciate the image of soldiers whatsoever, so we cleared up the misunderstanding through negotiation and peacefully came to an agreement."

== Track listing ==
No.	Title	Lyrics	Music	Arrangement	Length
1.	"Dalshabet Girls (Intro)"	Lee Jung Won	Lee Jung Won	Lee Jung Won	1:11
2.	"내 다리를 봐 (Be Ambitious)"	Minsul, 17HOLIC	Nam Ki Sang, Lim Kwang-Wook	Nam Ki Sang, Lim Kwang-Wook	3:23
3.	"Summer Break"	GaEun, 17HOLIC, Park Sangil	Park Sangil	Park Sangil	3:36
4.	"Hey Mr. Chu~♥"	Jiyul, DK$HINE, Jenny	DK$HINE	DK$HINE	3:25
5.	"Let It Go"	Serri, 17HOLIC	17HOLIC, Park Sangil	17HOLIC, Park Sangil	3:12
6.	"어쩜 (Maybe)"	Woohee	Woohee	Bull$EyE	3:34
7.	"내 다리를 봐 (Be Ambitious) (Inst.)"		Nam Ki Sang, Lim Kwang-Wook	Nam Ki Sang, Lim Kwang-Wook	3:23
Total length:					21:17

== Chart performance ==
=== Single chart ===
Title	Peak Positions	
Title	KOR	KOR
Title	Gaon	Billboard K-Pop Hot 100
"내 다리를 봐 (Be Ambitious)"	14	12

=== Album chart ===
Chart	Peak Position
Gaon Weekly album chart	10
Gaon Monthly album chart	31
Gaon Yearly album chart	—

=== Sales and certifications ===
Chart	Amount
Gaon physical sales	3,239+
