= Serri (singer) =

South Korean singer (born 1990)

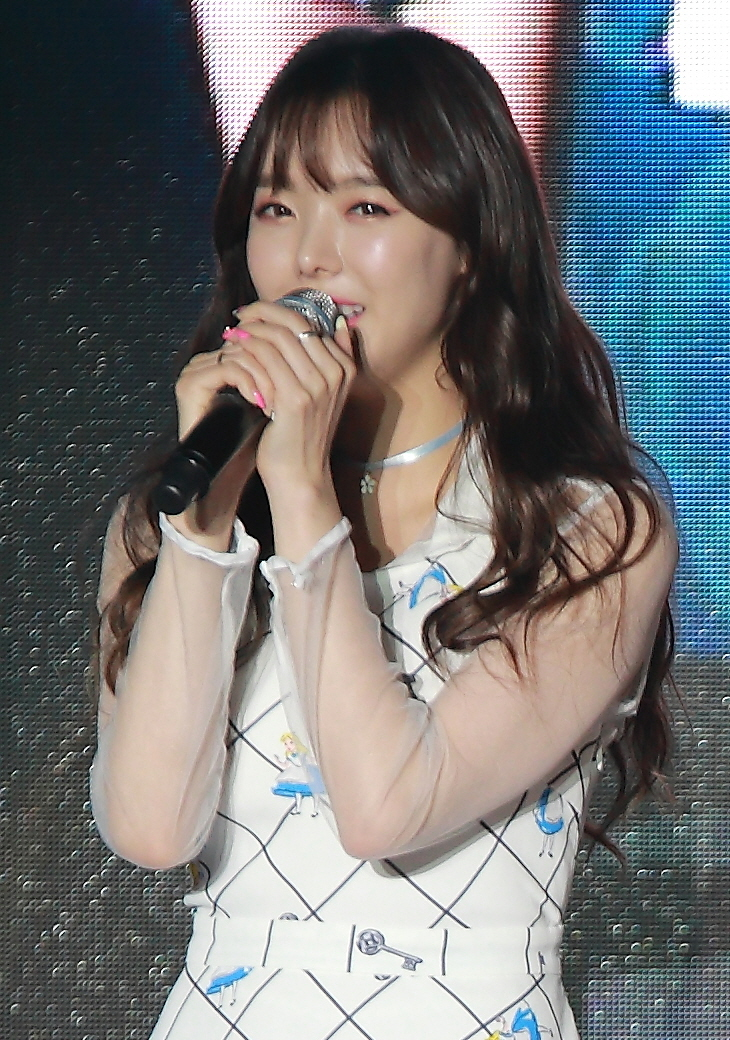
- Serri in 2016
- Born: Park Mi-yeon; September 16, 1990 (age 36); South Korea
- Occupation: Singer
- Musical career
- Genre: K-pop
- Instrument: Vocals
- Years active: 2011–present
- Labels: Happy Face; S-Dream; SbyMe
- Member of: Dal Shabet; RiRi

Korean name
- Hangul: 박미연
- RR: Bak Miyeon
- MR: Pak Miyŏn

Park Mi-yeon (Korean: 박미연; born September 16, 1990), known professionally as Serri (세리), is a South Korean singer. She debuted as a member of the South Korean girl group Dal Shabet in 2011 and was appointed its leader the following year. She is also part of the South Korean musical duo RiRi. She debuted as a solo artist on September 11, 2020, with the digital single "Come Closer".

== Career ==
=== 2011–2018: Debut with Dal Shabet and The Unit ===
Serri debuted as a member of the South Korean girl group Dal Shabet in 2011, with the release of their first mini-album Supa Dupa Diva. Following the departure of the group's former leader, Viki, the group's agency announced in June 2012 that Serri would assume the leadership position.

In 2017, Serri and fellow Dal Shabet member Woohee participated in KBS2's idol competition programme The Unit. In December 2017, Happy Face Entertainment announced that Serri, Ah Young and Subin's contracts had expired. The agency said it was discussing Dal Shabet's future with the members and that their departures did not, by themselves, mean that the group had disbanded.

=== 2019–present: Solo debut with "Come Closer" and RiRi ===
In April 2019, S-Dream Entertainment announced that it had signed Serri to an exclusive contract. In September 2020, the company announced Serri's first solo single, "Come Closer" (다가와), which was released on September 11.

In November 2025, Serri formed the duo RiRi with actress Choi Yeon-cheong, who performs as Gyuri. The duo released its first mini-album, Rush (Yes Yes, Call It Love), on November 1, 2025.

== Discography ==
=== Singles ===
List of singles as lead artist
Year	Title	Notes/Ref.
2020	"Come Closer" (다가와)	Released September 11
2020	"When You Call Me" (니가 부를 때)	Featuring Minsun
2021	"My My Love" (허기사랑)	
2022	"Sleep"	
2023	"Dream"	
2023	"Sarr"	
2024	"너를 보면"	Title track from the single album SbyMe; released December 24

=== With RiRi ===
- Rush (Yes Yes, Call It Love) (2025)

== Filmography ==
=== Television ===
- The Unit (2017) – contestant
- My Love from the Star (2013) – cameo, with Subin, as a junior actress to Cheon Song-yi and Yoo Se-mi
