= Dongduk Women's University =

Private university in Seoul, South Korea

Coordinates: 37.6063°N 127.0418°E

- Type: Private
- Established: 1950; 76 years ago
- President: Kim Myung-ae (김명애)
- Total staff: 350~
- Students: 7,500~
- Location: Seoul, South Korea
- Website: www.dongduk.ac.kr

Korean name
- Hangul: 동덕여자대학교
- Hanja: 同德女子大學校
- RR: Dongdeok yeoja daehakgyo
- MR: Tongdŏk yŏja taehakkyo

Dongduk Women's University (DWU; Korean: 동덕여자대학교) is a private university in Seoul, South Korea. Dongduk Women's University is originated from Dongwon Girls School, founded in 1950. DWU is composed of eight colleges, six departments, 18 majors, 16 departments of majors, and seven graduate schools. Facilities include its Design Research Center in Chungdam, Performing Art Center in Daehangno, and Dongduk Art Gallery in Insadong.

== Academics ==
Undergraduate offerings at Dongduk Women's University are divided among the Division of Humanities and the university's eight colleges: the College of Humanities (which includes foreign-language courses), College of Social Science, College of Natural Science, College of Computer and Information Science, College of Pharmacy, College of Arts, College of Design, and College of Performance Arts.

Graduate offerings are divided between the general graduate school and several specialized graduate schools: Fashion, Information Science, Women's Development, Education, Performance Arts, and Obesity Research.

== History ==
Dongduk Women's University was established as Dongduk Women's College (동덕여자대학), a four-year institution, in 1950. It moved to its present location in 1967. The college received permission to open a graduate school in 1980 and gained the status of a university in 1987. The most recent academic reorganization, resulting in the current structure, took place in 2003.

- 1900s
  - 1950 Founded Dongduk Women's College (DWC)
  - 1952 Dr. Cho, Dong-Shik as the First President of Dongduk Women's College
  - 1960 Lee, Kyung-Se as the chairman of the Board of DWC
  - 1961 Dr. Cho, Young-Wook as the Second President of DWC
  - 1963 Dr. Cho, Dong-Shik as the chairman of the Board of DWC
  - 1967 Moved to current campus in Wolgok-dong, Seoul
  - 1970 Dr. Lee, Neung-Woo as chairman of the Board
  - 1976 Dr. Cho, Young-Gak as chairman of the Board
  - 1980 Established Dongduk Women's Graduate School
  - 1981 Dr. Jung, Hae-Dong as Third President
  - 1983 Dr. Kim, Jong-Hyub as President
  - 1987 Accredited as a university with four colleges (Humanities, Social Science, Natural Science, and Arts & Physical Education)
  - 1988 Dr. Kim, Jong-Hyub as First President of Dongduk Women's University and Dr. Cho, Won-Young as Vice President
  - 1995 Opened Korea's First Women's Studies Library on campus
  - 1996 Dr. Cho, Won-Young as Third President of DWU; moved College of Design & Graduate School of Design to Design Research Center Building in Chungdam-dong
  - 1997 Established DWU Library Information Network System (DULINET)
  - 1997 Opened two new buildings on Main Campus: Soonginkwan & Women's Studies Center
  - 1998 Concluded cooperative agreement with Open Cyber University (OCU)
  - 1998 Opened Dongduk Student Service Center
  - 1999 Opened The Art Center (Yesoolkwan)
  - 1999 Ms. Lee, Eun-Joo as chairwoman of the Board of Trustees
- 2000s
  - 2000 Opened the Yuldong Memorial Music Hall
  - 2001 Opened the Performing Arts Center
  - 2003 Dr. Song, Suk-Goo as fifth President of DWU
  - 2004 Dr. Park, Sang-Gi as chairman of the Board of Trustees
  - 2004 Dr. Son, Bong-Ho as sixth President of DWU
  - 2005 Signed MOU with California State University, Sacramento (U.S.A.), Ochanomizu University (Japan)
  - 2005 Signed MOU with Ministry of Employment and Labor (Seoul)
  - 2005 Signed MOU with Zhejiang (浙江大學) University (China), opened Center for Teaching & Learning, accredited Department of Beauty Enhancement in Graduate School
  - 2006 Opened the Art and Craft Institute
  - 2006 Signed MOU with Meiji University (Japan), opened Division of Family & Child Studies and Department of Model Major, renaming the Social Education Center for Women to the Dongduk Women's Continuing Education Center
  - 2006. 09 Signed MOU with Lueneburg University (Germany), opened co-department of Korean Language Education and Creative Writing in Graduate School, opened Graduate School of Obesity, Beauty & Health Science, Graduate School of International Culture, Dr. Hong, Seong-Am as Acting President
  - 2007 Signed MOU with Siegen University (Germany) and University of Valenciennes and Hainaut-Cambresis (France)
  - 2007 Signed MOU with Paul Verlaine University – Metz (France) and Northumbria University (U.K.)
  - 2008 Signed MOU with Friedrich-Schiller Universitat Jena (Germany)
  - 2008 Dr. Kim, Un-Bae as Acting President
  - 2010 Dr. Maeng, Won-Jai as the foundation chairman of the board of the trustees
  - 2010 Dr. Kim, Yoon-Sik as acting president
  - 2011 Dr. Kim, Young Rae as the seventh president

Discussion of coeducational option by the university administration in late 2024 triggered widespread protests. Students led occupation of the main buildings and blocking access to the university. A legal battle is taking place between the school and the students.

== Colleges and departments ==
There are nine colleges and 30 departments:

- College of Humanities - Humanities, English, Japanese, French, German, Chinese
- College of Social Sciences - Business Administration, Economics, International Business, Library and Information Science, Social Welfare, Child Development and Education
- College of Natural Sciences - Food and Nutrition, Health Sciences, Physical Education, Applied Chemistry
- College of Information Science - Computer Science, Statistics and Information Science
- College of Pharmacy - Pharmacy
- College of Arts - Painting, Digital Craft Arts, Curatorial Studies and Art Management, Piano, Orchestral Instruments, Vocal music
- College of Design - Design
- College of Performance Arts - Dance, Media Arts and Entertainment, Applied Music, Modeling
- College of Liberal Arts and Teaching Profession

Seven Graduate Schools:

- General Graduate School
- Graduate School of Fashion Design
- Graduate School of Design
- Graduate School of Education
- Graduate School of Performing Arts
- Graduate School of Obesity, Beauty and Health Sciences
- Graduate School of International Culture

== Notable alumni ==
- Ah Young (Dal Shabet)
- Bae Noo-ri
- Bang Minah (Girl's Day)
- Choi Yoon-so
- Chu So-jung (Cosmic Girls)
- Gong Hyun-joo
- Greena Park
- Han Hye-rin
- Han Ji-eun
- Hong Soo-hyun
- Im Se-mi
- Jeon Yeo-been
- Jeon So-min
- Jiyul (Dal Shabet)
- Jo Yoon-hee
- Jung Ho-yeon
- Jung Ji-so
- Kim Ah-joong
- Kim Bohyung (Spica)
- Kim Gyu-ri
- Kim Ha-eun
- Kim Jae-kyung (Rainbow)
- Kim Jiyeon (Cosmic Girls)
- Kim Jung-hwa
- Kim Sung-eun
- Kim Yura (Girl's Day)
- Kwon Nara (Hello Venus)
- Kwon Sohyun (4Minute)
- Lee Joo-bin
- Lee Joo-yeon (After School)
- Lee Ka-Eun (After School)
- Lee Kyun-young (former Professor of Korean History)
- Lee Sae-rom (Fromis 9)
- Lee Si-young
- Lee Sung-kyung
- Lee Soo-kyung
- Lee Young-eun
- Lim Ju-eun
- Lim Na-young (PRISTIN)
- Myung Se-bin
- Nam Bo-ra
- Park Eun-ji
- Park Gyuri (KARA)
- Park Hyo-joo
- Park Ji-ye
- Park Jin-hee
- Park Jung-ah (Jewelry)
- Park Kyung-lim
- Park Si-eun
- Seo Hye-lin (EXID)
- Seo Hyun-jin (M.I.L.K.)
- Serri (Dal Shabet)
- Shin Ji (Koyote)
- Shin Jee-won (Berry Good)
- Son Eun-seo
- Song Ha-young (Fromis 9)
- Park Soobin (Cosmic Girls)
- Sora Choi
- Yoo Ara (Hello Venus)
- Yoon Ji-min

== See also ==
- List of universities and colleges in South Korea
- Education in South Korea
