= Vichy (disambiguation) =

Vichy is a town in Auvergne, France.

Vichy may also refer to:

- Vichy France, the French regime in metropolitan France collaborating with the Nazis during World War II
- Vichy, Missouri, a town in the United States
- Vichy shower, a kind of shower used at spas

== Drinks and food ==
- Vichy water, carbonated mineral water
- Vichy Pastilles, a brand of mint sweet (candy)
- Vichyssoise, a soup

== Other ==
- Vichy (fabric), woven pattern in cloth, cf in English language : Gingham. (Also known as Vichy check.)
- Vichy Water Park, Lithuania

== See also ==
- Vici (disambiguation)
- Vicci
- Vigy, a commune in Moselle, France
