= B.B.B (EP) =

Extended play by Dal Shabet

EP by Dal Shabet
- Released: January 8, 2014
- Recorded: 2013–2014
- Genres: Dance-pop; electropop
- Length: 21:36
- Language: Korean
- Labels: Happy Face; LOEN

Dal Shabet chronology
Be Ambitious (2013)	B.B.B (2014)	Joker Is Alive (2015)

Singles from B.B.B
- 1. "B.B.B (Big Baby Baby)" Released: January 8, 2014

B.B.B is the seventh extended play by South Korean girl group Dal Shabet. The album was digitally and physically released on January 8, 2014. "B.B.B (Big Baby Baby)" served as the promotional single.

== Background ==
The release of Dal Shabet's album was announced on December 12, 2013. Happy Face Entertainment revealed, "Dal Shabet will be returning in the second week of January. They will be releasing an album with a mature look." On January 2, 2014, Dal Shabet released concept photos for their upcoming album, which show off a darker and more mature side to the group. A music video teaser for 'B.B.B (Big Baby Baby)' was released on January 6, 2014. The album was digitally and physically released on January 8, 2014.

== Composition ==
The album is composed of six tracks; five new songs and one instrumental. The promotional track was co-created by famous Korean producer Shinsadong Tiger and producing team Beomi, Nangi. Beomi, Nangi also created track four, "Memories of You". Producing team BEATAMIN lent their help with the creation of "REWIND". BEATAMIN previously worked with Dal Shabet for their songs "Enter Dalshabet (Intro)" and "Come Closer (ft. Nassun)" from their album Bang Bang. This album marks the second time the members of Dal Shabet became involved with the production of their music. Member Subin helped write the lyrics and composed the song "Just Pass By", which was co-written by, and features, BTOB's Ilhoon.

== Promotion ==
On January 5, 2014, Dal Shabet appeared on the military television show 'Real Men', where they performed their title track for the troops. On January 8, 2014, the group held a comeback showcase at 'Dome Art Hall' for their fans. The showcase was used to publicly promote and reveal their album for the first time. The group began televised promotions of their album on January 9, 2014, by appearing on Mnet's 'M! Countdown'. The group ended the main televised promotional cycle of B.B.B (Big Baby Baby) on February 23, 2014, on SBS The Music Trend.

== Track listing ==
No.	Title	Lyrics	Music	Length
1.	"REWIND"	BEATAMIN, Benny Banana	BEATAMIN	3:36
2.	"B.B.B (Big Baby Baby)"	Shinsadong Tiger, Beomi, Nangi	Shinsadong Tiger, Beomi, Nangi	3:40
3.	"Just Pass By (그냥 지나가)" (Subin solo; feat. BTOB Ilhoon)	Subin, Ilhoon	Subin	3:45
4.	"Memories of You (너였나봐)"	Beomi, Nangi	Beomi, Nangi	3:15
5.	"B.B.B (Big Baby Baby) (S.Tiger Remix)"	Shinsadong Tiger, Beomi, Nangi	Shinsadong Tiger, Beomi, Nangi	3:40
6.	"B.B.B (Big Baby Baby) (Inst.)"	---	Shinsadong Tiger. Beomi, Nangi	3:40
Total length:				21:36

== Chart performance ==
=== Single chart ===
Title	Peak Positions	
Title	KOR	KOR
Title	Gaon	Billboard K-Pop Hot 100
"B.B.B (Big Baby Baby)"	16	15

=== Album chart ===
Chart	Peak Position
Gaon Weekly album chart	7
Gaon Monthly album chart	19

=== Sales and certifications ===
Chart	Amount
Gaon physical sales	5,495+
