= Have, Don't Have =

Extended play by Dal Shabet

EP by Dal Shabet
- Released: November 13, 2012
- Recorded: 2012
- Genre: Dance-pop; electropop; synthpop
- Length: 21:07
- Label: Happy Face; CJ E&M

Dal Shabet chronology
Bang Bang (2012)	Have, Don't Have (2012)	Be Ambitious (2013)

Singles from Have, Don't Have
- 1. "Have, Don't Have" Released: November 13, 2012

Have, Don't Have (Korean: 있기 없기; RR: Itgi Eobtgi) is the fifth extended play by South Korean girl group Dal Shabet, released on November 13, 2012. "Have, Don't Have" was used as the promotional song. The album contains four new songs, one remix and one instrumental.

== History ==
Following a brief musical hiatus, Dal Shabet released their fifth extended play Have, Don't Have, with the lead single "Have, Don't Have" (있기 없기). The title track is officially described as 'a disco song that is easy for listeners to sing along to and the lyrics describe a girl’s cute feelings towards a guy'. This is Dal Shabet's first release that was not produced with the help of E-Tribe, their in-company producers and managers. Producers and composers that contributed to the album include Kim Do Hoon, MARCO, DK$HINE, Min Yeon Jae and MIIII.

A limited-edition version of the album, which included a photo book and DVD, was also released.

== Track listing ==
Track list
No.	Title	Length
1.	"샤르르 (For Darling)"	3:11
2.	"Have, Don't Have" (있기 없기)	3:35
3.	"유리인형 (DON`T TOUCH)"	3:50
4.	"Falling In Love"	3:43
5.	"Have, Don't Have (Electro Swing Remix)" (있기 없기 (Electro Swing Remix))	3:13
6.	"Have, Don't Have (Inst.)" (있기 없기 (Inst.))	3:35
Total length:		21:07

== Chart performance ==
=== Singles ===
Title	Peak Positions	
Title	KOR	KOR
Title	Gaon	Billboard K-Pop Hot 100
"Have, Don't Have"	22	19

=== Album chart ===
Chart	Peak Position
Gaon Weekly Album Chart	5
Gaon Monthly Album Chart	20
Gaon Yearly Album Chart	—

== Sales and certifications ==
Provider	Amount	Ref
Gaon Physical Sales	3,504+	
