= Ah Young =

South Korean singer and actress (born 1991)

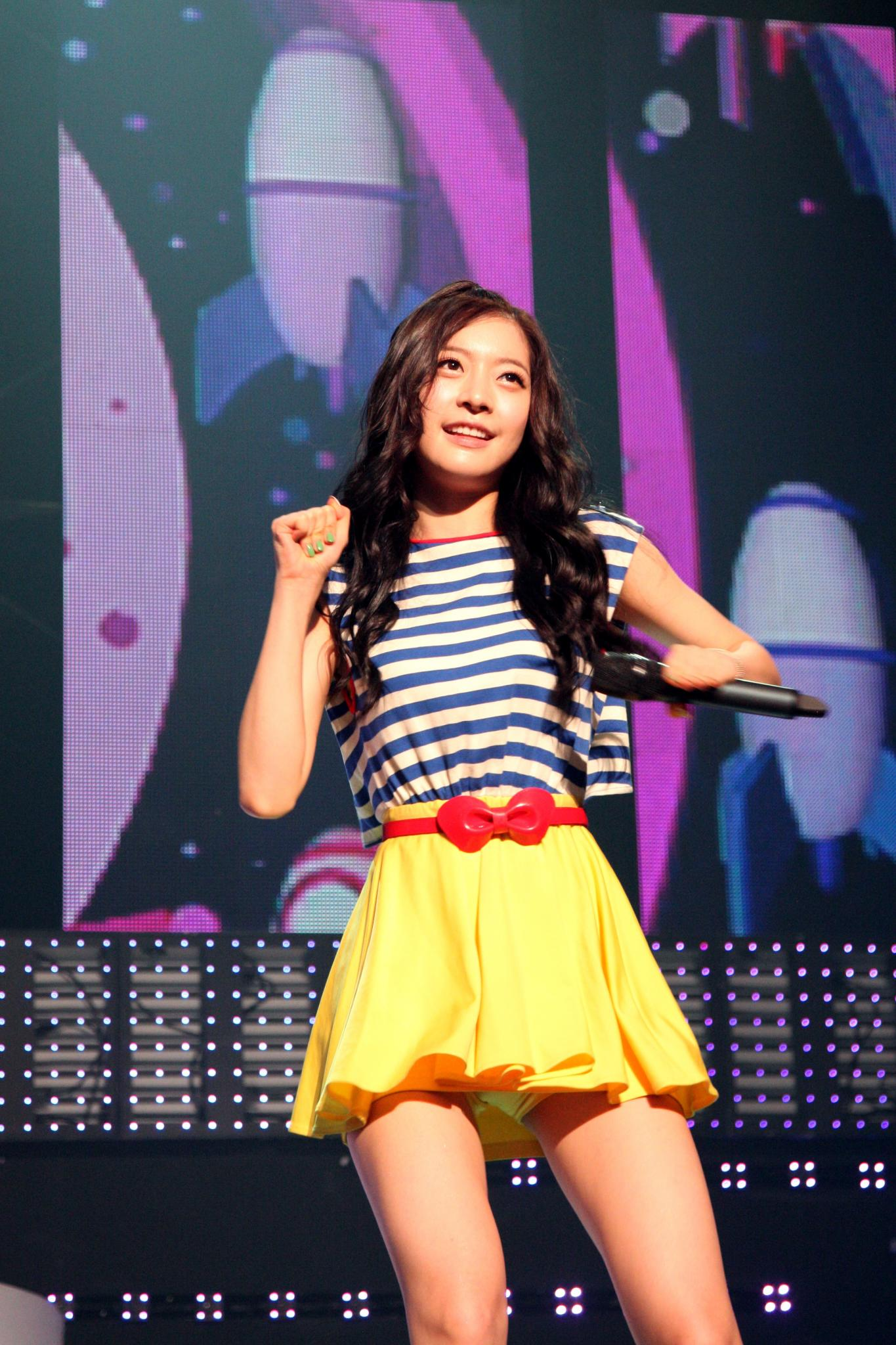
- Ah Young in July 2011
- Born: Cho A-young; 26 May 1991 (age 35); Seoul, South Korea
- Other name: Ah Young
- Education: Dongduk Women's University
- Occupations: Singer; actress
- Years active: 2011–present
- Agent: SidusHQ
- Musical career
- Genre: K-pop
- Instrument: Vocals
- Label: Happy Face
- Formerly of: Dal Shabet

Korean name
- Hangul: 조자영
- Hanja: 趙慈英
- RR: Jo Jayeong
- MR: Cho Chayŏng

Stage name
- Hangul: 아영
- Hanja: 雅英
- RR: Ayeong
- MR: Ayŏng

Cho Ah-young (Korean: 조자영; born May 26, 1991), better known mononymously as Ah Young (아영), is a South Korean singer and actress, best known as a member of the South Korean girl group Dal Shabet.

== Early life ==
Ah Young was born on May 26, 1991, in Seoul, South Korea. She attended Dongduk Women's University and majored in entertainment.

== Career ==
=== 2011–2012: Career beginnings ===
Ah Young made her official debut through the release of Supa Dupa Diva with Dal Shabet on January 3, 2011.

On February 28, 2011, Ah Young made a cameo, with Dal Shabet, in the hit KBS drama Dream High, as a student of Kirin High School. Ah Young and Dal Shabet later appeared in the movie Wonderful Radio as the fictional girl group 'Corby Girls'.

Ah Young also participated in Dal Shabet's reality shows Sweet Sweet Story and Cool Friends, as well as their YouTube series Shabet on Air.

=== 2013–present: Acting roles ===
It was announced on January 9, 2013, that Ah Young would be making her first solo drama appearance in KBS' Ad Genius Lee Tae-baek. She played Gong Sun-hye, a secretary for the advertisement firm 'GRC'. Her character received media spotlight for her eccentric personality, as well as her unique sense of fashion.

Ah Young was revealed to have joined the cast of the SBS historical drama Jang Ok-jung, Living by Love on March 14, 2013. She played the recurring character Princess Myeongan, who is known for displaying a cute sense of humor throughout the palace.

On May 22, 2013, Ah Young was added to the cast of the movie No Breathing. She played the character Se-Mi, a high school student who dreamed of becoming a famous singer. No Breathing marks Ah Young's first solo appearance in a big-screen film.

On September 9, 2013, Ah Young was confirmed to be joining the cast of the movie 58 – The Year of the Dog as the character Geum Hong. The movie was released in 2014.

In November 2013, Ah Young landed her first leading role in Naver TV's web drama Someday, playing the character Lee Ji-eun.

It was revealed on June 13, 2014, that Ah Young had been cast in the MBC drama Diary of a Night Watchman as the recurring character Hong Cho-hee.

In November 2014, Ah Young was cast in a lead role in MBC's drama Love Frequency 37.2, playing the character Jung Sun-hee.

In October 2016, Ah Young was cast in a support role in SBS's drama Our Gap-soon, playing the Gap-dol's colleague Kim Young-ran.

In December 2017, Ahyoung joined SidusHQ after her contract with Happy Face Entertainment ended. With a change of label, her future activities with Dal Shabet remains in discussion.

== Filmography ==
=== Films ===
Year	Title	Role	Other notes
2012	Wonderful Radio	Corby Girls (with Dal Shabet)	Supporting role
2013	No Breathing	Se-mi	Supporting role
2014	58 The Year of the Dog	Geum Hong	Main role

=== Television series ===
Year	Title	Role	Other notes
2011	Dream High	Kirin Student	Cameo, ep. 16
2013	Ad Genius Lee Tae-baek	Gong Sun-hye	
2013	Jang Ok-jung, Living by Love	Princess Myeongan	
2013	Someday	Lee Ji-eun	
2014	12 Years Promise	Park Moo-hee	
2014	Diary of a Night Watchman	Hong Cho-hee	
2014	Love Frequency 37.2	Jung Sun-hee	
2016–2017	Our Gap-soon	Kim Young-ran	
2018	Through the Waves	Oh Bok-shil	KBS TV Novel
2019	Best Chicken	Moon So-dam	

== Discography ==
=== Soundtrack appearances ===
Year	Song	Album
2013	"Your Meaning"	Someday OST

=== Collaborations ===
Year	Song	Other performer(s)
2013	"Kuulkuk"	Dis Boyz
