= Bang Bang (Dal Shabet album) =

Album by Dal Shabet

Studio album by Dal Shabet
- Released: June 6, 2012
- Recorded: 2010–2012
- Genres: Dance-pop; electropop
- Length: 46:37
- Labels: Happy Face; CJ E&M

Dal Shabet chronology
Hit U (2012)	Bang Bang (2012)	Have, Don't Have (2012)

Singles from Bang Bang
- 1. "Mr. Bang Bang" Released: June 6, 2012

Bang Bang is the first studio album by South Korean girl group Dal Shabet, released June 6, 2012. "Mr. Bang Bang" served as the lead single.

== Background ==
Immediately following the end of promotions for their fourth mini-album, Hit U, Dal Shabet announced that they would be returning to the music scene in June of the same year. The group expressed, "We’re glad to have been able to show a different image than our previous ones with this comeback. We'll be using the experience gained from our fourth mini-album for our next album.”

On May 23, 2012, it was formally announced that Viki, Dal Shabet's leader and rapper, would be departing from the group to pursue individual activities. It was announced the following day that Viki would be replaced with a long-standing Happy Face Entertainment trainee Bae Woo-hee (Woohee).

On May 27, 2012, it was revealed that the upcoming release would be Dal Shabet's first full-length album and would be titled Bang Bang. The music video to the lead single, "Mr. Bang Bang", was released on June 5, 2012. The album was digitally and physically released the following day.

== Composition ==
The album consists of fourteen tracks; nine new songs, four previously released songs and one instrumental. The four previously released singles contain Viki's vocals, while the nine new songs contain vocals from Woohee.

Happy Face Entertainment's owners, E-Tribe, contributed to the album by producing the promotional single, "Mr. Bang Bang", as well as the previously released singles. Fellow label mate, Nassun, who is credited as Beatamin, helped produce the intro track, as well as "Try to Come Closer (ft. Nassun)". Happy Face Entertainment hired the help of various "underground" producers, such as DK$HINE, DJ R2, Blacc Hole and Gentleman.

== Promotions ==
Dal Shabet initially promoted the album through the use of specially customized lamborghinis, which were driven around popular areas of South Korea, including Seoul. One day prior to the official release of the album, Dal Shabet held their first ever comeback showcase in honor of their first studio album. Official promotions began on June 7, 2012, on the music program M! Countdown, where the group held a special comeback stage, and performed "Enter Dal★Shabet (Intro)", "Try to Come Closer (ft. Nassun)" and "Mr. Bang Bang".

== Track listing ==
No.	Title	Lyrics	Music	Arrangement	Length
1.	"Enter Dal★Shabet (Intro)"	BEATAMIN	BEATAMIN	BEATAMIN	1:16
2.	"Try to Come Closer (다가와 봐)" (feat. Nassun)	BEATAMIN	BEATAMIN	BEATAMIN	3:21
3.	"Mr. Bang Bang"	E-Tribe, 민연재	E-Tribe	E-Tribe	3:40
4.	"Girl Girl Girls" (feat. Makustle)	DK$HINE, 민연재	DK$HINE	DK$HINE	3:18
5.	"Disco Time"	남기상, 강전명, 권선익, 최도관	남기상, 권선익, 최도관	권선익, 최도관	3:15
6.	"Love Shake"	민연재, 남기상	남기상, 권선익, 최도관	권선익, 최도관	3:34
7.	"Without You, I… (니가 없이 난)"	황종하, DJ R2, BLACC HOLE	BLACC HOLE	BLACC HOLE	3:55
8.	"Hit U" (feat. Bigtone)	E-Tribe, 민연재	E-Tribe	E-Tribe, 장준호	4:12
9.	"Supa Dupa Diva"	E-Tribe	E-Tribe	E-Tribe, 장준호	3:01
10.	"Pink Rocket (핑크 로켓)"	E-Tribe	E-Tribe	E-Tribe	3:26
11.	"Many Boys"	손창일, 장현철	BLACC HOLE, 장현철	BLACC HOLE	3:21
12.	"Bling Bling (블링블링)"	E-Tribe	E-Tribe, 장준호	E-Tribe, 장준호, 공현식	3:34
13.	"Mirror"	GENTLEMAN	GENTLEMAN	GENTLEMAN	3:04
14.	"Mr. Bang Bang (Inst.)"	E-Tribe, 민연재	E-Tribe	E-Tribe	3:40

== Chart performance ==
Chart	Peak Position
Gaon Weekly Album Chart	7
Gaon Monthly Album Chart	16

== Sales ==
Provider	Amount	Ref
Gaon Physical Sales	4,350+	
