= Hit U =

Extended play by Dal Shabet

EP by Dal Shabet
- Released: January 27, 2012
- Recorded: Happy Face Studio, Seoul, South Korea; 2012
- Genre: K-pop; dance-pop
- Length: 22:54
- Label: Happy Face; CJ E&M
- Producer: E-Tribe

Dal Shabet chronology
Bling Bling (2011)	Hit U (2012)	Bang Bang (2012)

Singles from Hit U
- 1. "Hit U" Released: January 27, 2012

Hit U is the fourth Korean extended play by South Korean girl group Dal Shabet, released January 27, 2012. The album was promoted through their title track "Hit U". It was their first release to hit number 1 on the Gaon Albums Chart, and their most successful release to date. It was the last promotion cycle with member Viki before her departure.

== Release and promotion ==
The official music video of "Hit U" was released on January 26, 2012. Promotions for "Hit U" began the same day on M! Countdown. The mini-album was released the next day.

== Track listing ==
No.	Title	Lyrics	Music	Arrangement	Length
1.	"Fire It Up"	E-Tribe	E-Tribe	E-Tribe	3:07
2.	"Hit U (feat. Bigtone)"	E-Tribe, 민연재	E-Tribe	E-Tribe, 장준호	4:13
3.	"Chu Ma Boy"	김동휘, 이세호	김동휘, 이세호	김동휘, 이세호	3:46
4.	"Dream In U (Remix)"	E-Tribe, 이치우	E-Tribe, 이세호	E-Tribe, 장준호	3:23
5.	"Hit U (feat. Bigtone) (Remix)"	E-Tribe, 민연재	E-Tribe	케이솔	4:12
6.	"Hit U (Inst.)"	E-Tribe, 민연재	E-Tribe	E-Tribe, 장준호	4:13

== Chart performance ==
Chart	Peak Position
Gaon Weekly Album Chart	1
Gaon Monthly Album Chart	24

=== Sales ===
Chart (2012)	Amount	Ref
Gaon Physical Sales	11,000+	
