= Bling Bling (EP) =

Extended play by Dal Shabet

EP by Dal Shabet
- Released: August 11, 2011
- Recorded: Happy Face Studio, Seoul, South Korea; 2011
- Genres: K-pop; dance-pop
- Length: 14:16
- Labels: Happy Face; LOEN
- Producer: E-Tribe

Dal Shabet chronology
Pink Rocket (2011)	Bling Bling (2011)	Hit U (2012)

Singles from Bling Bling
- 1. "Bling Bling" Released: August 11, 2011

Bling Bling is the third mini-album by South Korean girl group Dal Shabet, released August 11, 2011. "Bling Bling" was used as the lead single, and the official music video was released on August 10. Promotions for "Bling Bling" began on August 12, on Y-Star Live Power Music.

== Track listing ==
No.	Title	Lyrics	Music	Arrangement	Length
1.	"Beep"	E-Tribe	E-Tribe, 장준호	E-Tribe, 장준호, 공현식	0:57
2.	"Bling Bling"	E-Tribe	E-Tribe, 장준호	E-Tribe, 장준호, 공현식	3:20
3.	"Dream in U"	E-Tribe, 이치우	E-Tribe, 이치우	E-Tribe, 이치우	3:23
4.	"Moonlight"	장준호, 공현식	장준호, 공현식	장준호, 공현식	3:16
5.	"Bling Bling (Inst.)"	E-Tribe	E-Tribe, 장준호	E-Tribe, 장준호, 공현식	3:20

== Charts and certifications ==
Chart	Peak Position
Gaon Weekly Album Chart	55
Gaon Monthly Album Chart	27

=== Sales and certifications ===
Chart (2012)	Amount	Ref
Gaon Physical Sales	3,600+	
