= Pink Rocket =

Extended play recording by Dal Shabet

EP by Dal Shabet
- Released: April 14, 2011
- Recorded: Happy Face Studio, Seoul, South Korea; 2011
- Genre: K-pop; dance-pop
- Length: 16:33
- Label: Happy Face; Sony Korea
- Producer: E-Tribe

Dal Shabet chronology
Supa Dupa Diva (2011)	Pink Rocket (2011)	Bling Bling (2011)

Singles from Pink Rocket
- 1. "Pink Rocket" Released: April 14, 2011

Pink Rocket (Korean: 핑크 로켓) is the second Korean extended play by South Korean girl group Dal Shabet, released April 14, 2011. "Pink Rocket" was used as the lead single, and the official music video was released on April 13. Promotions for "Pink Rocket" began on April 14 on M! Countdown.

== Track listing ==
No.	Title	Lyrics	Music	Arrangement	Length
1.	"Shakalaka"	E-Tribe, Bigtone	E-Tribe, 장준호	E-Tribe, 장준호	3:18
2.	"Pink Rocket"	E-Tribe	E-Tribe	E-Tribe	3:26
3.	"그대로 멈춰라 (Just Stop)"	Koonta	구자경, 이호승	구자경, 이호승, E-Tribe	3:11
4.	"Rollin’ Fallin’"	장준호	장준호, 공현식	장준호, 공현식	3:16
5.	"Pink Rocket (Inst.)"	E-Tribe	E-Tribe	E-Tribe	3:26

== Charts and sales ==
Chart	Peak position
Gaon Weekly Album Chart	7
Gaon Monthly Album Chart	28

=== Sales ===
Chart (2011)	Amount	Ref
Gaon Physical Sales	3,560+	
