= Joker Is Alive =

Extended play by Dal Shabet

Joker is Alive

EP by Dal Shabet
- Released: April 15, 2015
- Recorded: 2015
- Genres: K-pop; R&B; ballad
- Length: 17:16
- Labels: Happy Face; LOEN
- Producers: Subin; Shim; Jae-hoon; Issueman

Dal Shabet chronology
B.B.B (2014)	Joker is Alive (2015)	Naturalness (2016)

Singles from Joker Is Alive
- 1. "Joker" Released: April 15, 2015

Joker Is Alive is the eighth extended play by the South Korean girl group Dal Shabet. It was released on April 15, 2015, by Happy Face Entertainment.

== Background ==
The EP was co-written and co-produced by member Subin.

== Release and controversy ==
In April 2015, Dal Shabet posted a picture for their comeback on their Facebook page. On April 10, they posted a picture with the title track "Joker". On April 12, they posted the first teaser for the album. On April 14, they released a teaser for the music video. The official video for the title track "Joker" was released on April 15, the same day as the album.

As they were promoting the album, KBS censored "Joker" when they aired the track as they claimed that the English word for "Joker", when sung in a staccato style in the song, sounded like a certain Korean expletive.

== Commercial performance ==
The EP debuted at number 8 on South Korea's Gaon Album Chart. The title track, "Joker", charted at number 20 on the Gaon Digital Chart, becoming their 8th and last single to reach the Top 20.

== Track listing ==
The 8th Mini Album Joker Is Alive
No.	Title	Lyrics	Music	Length
1.	"To Darling"	Subin, Shim Jae-hoon, Issueman	Subin, Shim Jae-hoon, Issueman	1:58
2.	"홀려" (Obsessed)	Subin, Jiyul, Gaeun	Subin, Shim Jae-hoon, Issueman	2:59
3.	"Joker"	Subin, Shim Jae-hoon, Issueman	Subin, Shim Jae-hoon, Issueman	2:56
4.	"I'm Not"	Subin, Shim Jae-hoon, Issueman	Subin, Shim Jae-hoon, Issueman	3:19
5.	"OK Boy"	Subin, Shim Jae-hoon	Subin, Shim Jae-hoon	3:08
6.	"Joker" (Inst.)			2:56

== Charts ==
Chart	Peak Position
Gaon Weekly Album Chart	8

=== Sales ===
Chart (2015)	Amount	Ref
Gaon Physical Sales	4,786+	
