= Fri. Sat. Sun =

Extended play by Dal Shabet

EP by Dal Shabet
- Released: September 29, 2016
- Recorded: 2016
- Genre: Pop; dance; K-pop
- Length: 16:19
- Language: Korean
- Label: Happy Face; LOEN

Dal Shabet chronology
Naturalness (2016)	Fri. Sat. Sun (2016)

Singles from Fri. Sat. Sun
- 1. "Fri. Sat. Sun" Released: September 29, 2016

Fri. Sat. Sun (often stylised as FRI. SAT. SUN) is the tenth EP by South Korean girl group, Dal Shabet. The EP consists of five songs. It was released on September 29, 2016, along with a music video for the title track.

== Background and release ==
On September 16, 2016, Dal Shabet announced the name of date of their upcoming mini album. The comeback schedule was revealed on September 17 stating that over the next few days the group would release individual member teaser images, special teasers, music video teasers, an album highlight medley, and an unveiling of the official track list.

== Singles ==
The title track of the album, "Fri. Sat. Sun", written and composed by Shinsadong Tiger, Monster Factory and Samuel Ku, was released at midnight on September 29, 2016. Promotions for the single began on M!Countdown broadcast by Mnet.

== Track listing ==
Digital download
No.	Title	Lyrics	Music	Arrangement	Length
1.	"Ya Heart" (속마음)	C-no, Onesta	C-no, Onesta	C-no	3:19
2.	"FRI. SAT. SUN" (금토일)	Shinsadong Tiger, Monster Factory, Samuel Ku	Shinsadong Tiger, Monster Factory, Samuel Ku	Shinsadong Tiger, Monster Factory, Samuel Ku	3:02
3.	"Hard 2 Love" (좋으니까)	남기상, 이하진	남기상, 권선익, Kunny, Xeno	박기현	3:22
4.	"Fly Boy"	도나, RICKY, 커즈디(CuzD)	도나, RICKY, 커즈디(CuzD)	도나, RICKY, 커즈디(CuzD)	3:14
5.	"Some, What?" (썸, 뭐?)	어벤전승	어벤전승	어벤전승	3:22
