= Vicci =

Vicci is a given name which may refer to:

- Vicci Laine (born 1960), American transgender performer and activist
- Vicci Martinez (born 1984), American singer/songwriter

== See also ==
- Vici (disambiguation)
- Vicky (disambiguation)
- Vikki (disambiguation)
