= Vici =

Vici may refer to:

- The plural of the Latin vicus
- "I conquered" in Latin, first person perfect of vincere, notably part of the phrase Veni, vidi, vici
- V.I.C.I., short for Voice Input Child Identicant, nicknamed Vicki, the android title character in Small Wonder
- Vici Gaming, Chinese eSports organization with teams in Dota 2, League of Legends, and Hearthstone
- Vici Properties, American real estate investment trust
- Vici, Oklahoma

== See also ==
- Vicci
- Vichy (disambiguation)
- Viki (disambiguation)
