= Naturalness (Dal Shabet EP) =

Extended play by Dal Shabet

EP by Dal Shabet
- Released: January 5, 2016
- Recorded: 2015
- Genre: Pop; dance; K-pop
- Length: 24:07
- Language: Korean
- Label: Happy Face; LOEN

Dal Shabet chronology
| Joker Is Alive (2015) | Naturalness (2016) | FRI. SAT. SUN (2016) |

Singles from Naturalness
- 1. "Someone Like U" Released: January 5, 2016

Naturalness is the ninth EP by South Korean girl group, Dal Shabet. The EP consists of six songs and one instrumental. It marked their first release as a four-member group since the departure of members Jiyul and Gaeun in early December 2015. It was released on January 5, 2016, to commemorate the fifth anniversary of the group.

== Background and release ==
On December 21, 2015, Happy Face Entertainment release a teaser image featuring the release date of the upcoming album, and confirming the title of the EP to be Naturalness. On December 24 were released two teaser images featuring members Serri and Woohee, meanwhile on December 25 images of members Ayoung and Subin were released. On December 28 it was released the full track list on their official Twitter account. On December 29 and 30, 2015, were released two teasers of the music video for the title track, titulated "Someone Like You". On January 3, 2016, a highlight medley of the EP was released online. On January 4 the music video was released and on January 5 the EP was released on South Korean music sites and on iTunes for the global market.

== Commercial performance ==
In South Korea, Naturalness entered and peaked at number 10 on the Gaon Album Chart at the week ending January 9, 2016. In its second week, the EP fell thirty places and charted at number 40 on the week ending January 16. In its fourth week, Naturalness charted at number 29, the second best position in its five consecutive weeks within the chart. The EP charted at number 24 for the month of January on the Gaon Album Chart with 2,758 album sales.

The title track of the album, "Someone Like You", entered and peaked at number 49 on the Gaon Digital Chart at the week ending January 9, 2016.

== Track listing ==
The 9th Mini Album 'Naturalness'
| No. | Title | Lyrics | Music | Arrangement | Length |
|---|---|---|---|---|---|
| 0. | Untitled | | Subin |
| 1. | "Stay with You" (지긋이; jigeus-i) | Subin | Subin | Kim Minseob, Choi Seongmin | 3:20 |
| 2. | "Someone Like U" (너 같은; neo gat-eun) | Brave Brothers | Brave Brothers, JS, Glen Choi, Fingazz, Chantelle Paige | JS, Brave Brothers | 3:20 |
| 3. | "From Head to Toe (Subin Solo)" (머리부터 발끝까지; meolibuteo balkkeutkkaji) | Subin | Subin | Super Bomb | 3:08 |
| 4. | "Beautiful Liar (Serri Solo) (ft. Simms)" (착한 남자; chaghan namja) | Dona, Denis Seo, Simms | Dona, Denis Seo | Jeon Sangmin, Dona, Seo Jihyeon, Deni Seo | 3:07 |
| 5. | "Dreams Come True (Ayoung Solo)" | DK$HINE | DK$HINE | DK$HINE | 4:06 |
| 6. | "Love Hurts (Woohee Solo)" (사랑한다고 해서; salanghandago haeseo) | Dona, Denis Seo | Dona, Denis Seo | Dona, Kim Hyunjung, Jeon Sang Min, Seo Jihyeon | 3:46 |
| 7. | "Someone Like U (Instrumental)" | | Brave Brothers, JS, Glen Choi, Fingazz, Chantelle Paige | JS, Brave Brothers | 3:20 |
| Total length: | | | | | 24:07 |

== Chart performance ==
=== Weekly charts ===
| Chart (2016) | Peak position |
|---|---|
| South Korea (Gaon Album Chart) | 10 |

=== Monthly ===
| Chart (2016) | Peak position |
|---|---|
| South Korea (Gaon Album Chart) | 24 |
