= E-Tribe =

South Korean record artist and music duo

E-Tribe; 이트라이브
- Origin: Seoul, South Korea
- Genres: Pop, bubblegum pop
- Occupations: Record producer; singer
- Instruments: keyboards; synthesizers; Sequencer
- Years active: 2006–present
- Label: Elephant Entertainment
- Members: Ahn Myung-won; Kim Young-deuk

E-Tribe (이트라이브) is a South Korean record artist and music duo consisting of Ahn Myung-won and Kim Young-deuk. They are most known for producing "Gee" by Girls' Generation, "U-Go-Girl" by Lee Hyo-ri, "Yayaya" by T-ara, "It's You" by Super Junior, and "I Know" by Se7en. Due to the consistent success of these singles, the duo has become well known in the South Korean music scene.

In January 2011, Happy Face Entertainment debuted their own girl group, Dal Shabet. Their debut song, "Supa Dupa Diva", produced by E-Tribe was released on January 3, 2011. The duo has also produced a number of their comeback tracks, including "Pink Rocket", "Bling Bling", "Hit U" and "Mr. Bang Bang".

Since late 2011 only Ahn Myung-won uses the name E-tribe. In 2012 he founded Elephant Entertainment. An entertainment company with various artists and is the CEO of that company.

== Members ==
=== Ahn Myung-won ===
- Born on January 30, 1978
- CEO of Elephant Entertainment

== Former Members ==
=== Kim Young-deuk ===
- Also known as E.D.
- Born on January 20, 1977, in Daejeon
- Music professor at Daekyeung University since 2013

== Credits ==
Below is a list of works produced and composed by E-Tribe in chronological order. Listed by year and date [MM/DD].

=== 2006 ===
- [02/01] "Slave" (노예) for Lee Hyori
- [03/08] "I Know" (난 알아요) for Se7en

=== 2007 ===
- [06/14] "Girl Like That" for Son Dam Bi

=== 2008 ===
- [03/12] "Let's Get It Party" for Gummy
- [04/08] "4th Hitter" (4번타자) for Honey Boys
- [07/01] "Kiss Me (Feat. Ymga)" for Uhm Jung-hwa
- [07/14] "U-Go-Girl" for Lee Hyo-ri
- [07/14] "P. P. P (Punky Punky Party) (With Nassun)" for Lee Hyo-ri
- [10/01] "It's Okay" (괜찮아) for Nassun
- [10/01] "S.W.E.E.T (Feat. Leo Kekoa)" for Nassun
- [10/01] "After Party (Feat. Sugar Flow)" for Nassun
- [11/27] "Yodel" for KARA

=== 2009 ===
- [01/07] "Gee" for Girls' Generation
- [02/18] "How" (어떻게) for Sori
- [02/26] "Say My Name (Feat. Gilme)" for Nassun
- [02/26] "come2play (Feat. Han Seung-yeon of Kara)" (놀러와) for Nassun
- [02/26] "For You (Feat. Kim Kyung Rok of V.O.S)" (바로 너)for Nassun
- [04/30] "I like choco ft. Nassun and Happyface" for Kim Jung-eun
- [05/14] "It's You" (너라고) for Super Junior
- [05/19] "Crazy" for Lee Jung Hyun
- [05/19] "2night (Feat. Bigtone & Sugar Flow)" for Lee Jung Hyun
- [07/10] "Cold Noodles" (냉면) for Jessica (Girls' Generation) & Park Myeong-su
- [08/25] "Rally" for Jewelry
- [09/17] "Confession" (告白) for Super Junior-M
- [09/17] "Love Is" (사랑이란) for Lee Seung-gi
- [10/29] "Rally Ver. 2" for Seo In-guk
- [11/19] "Mom" (엄마) for E-Tribe
- [11/19] "Mom (Acoustic guitar ver.)" (엄마) for E-Tribe

=== 2010 ===
- [01/28] "Star Star Star" (별별별) for Girls' Generation
- [01/28] "Be Happy" for Girls' Generation
- [03/22] "Star Star Star (Acoustic R&B ver)" (별별별) for Girls' Generation
- [04/16] "Outlaw in the Wild" (황야의 무법자) for Hyuna of 4minute & Nassun
- [04/30] "World Cup Chant" for "The Brotherhood"
- [06/08] "My Luv" for XCROSS
- [07/20] "Whale" (고래) for Nicole Jung of Kara & Park Myeong-su
- [08/26] "U" for 4MEN
- [09/03] "O-IWI-O" for Nassun & MBLAQ's GO. O-IWI-O is a response to Gee
- [10/11] "Blue Moon (Feat. Nassun)" for Sun Woo
- [10/21] "Eyes Nose Mouth (Feat. 4MEN)" (눈코입) for Sun Woo
- [12/02] "Yayaya" for T-ara
- [12/22] "What Are You Doing (4MEN. MIII)" (뭐하) for YWHO家

=== 2011 ===
- [01/04] "Dal Shabet" for Dal Shabet
- [01/04] "Supa Dupa Diva" for Dal Shabet
- [01/04] "Hottie" (매력덩어리) for Dal Shabet
- [01/04] "Bad Guy" (나쁜 남자) for Joo
- [01/05] "Honey Funny Bunny" for U-Know Yunho (TVXQ)
- [01/10] "Cry" for MBLAQ
- [01/26] "Then I can live" (그때난사는거야) for Haeri of Davichi
- [02/16] "Don't know" (잘몰라) for Park Daye
- [02/22] "Uppercut" for Insooni
- [03/08] "Angel" for Kim Hyung Jun
- [03/08] "oH! aH!" for Kim Hyung Jun
- [04/14] "Shakalaka" for Dal Shabet
- [04/14] "Don't move" (그대로 멈춰라) for Dal Shabet
- [04/14] "Pink Rocket" for Dal Shabet
- [05/17] "Shameless Lie" (뻔뻔한 거짓말) for Gayoon from Lie To Me OST
- [06/29] "Yayaya remix ver." for T-ara
- [08/11] "BEEP" for Dal Shabet
- [08/11] "Dream in U" for Dal Shabet
- [08/11] "Bling Bling" for Dal Shabet
- [11/01] "That Man, That Woman" (그남자 그여자) for 4men & MIIII
- [11/01] "That Woman" (그여자) for 4men & MIIII

=== 2012 ===
- [01/26] "Hit U" for Dal Shabet
- [01/26] "Hit U (Remix)" for Dal Shabet
- [01/26] "Dream in U (Remix)" for Dal Shabet
- [06/07] "Mr. Bang Bang" for Dal Shabet

=== 2013 ===
- [02/21] "One Hour Two Hours" (한 시간 두 시간) for MIII
- [08/20] "Why not" for History
- [11/06] "Hush" for miss A
- [11/06] "Hush (Party Ver.)" for miss A

=== 2015 ===
- [05/21] "Slow down" for History
- [07/31] "Pinocchio" for Insooni
- [11/02] "Cry & Blow" (울고 분다) for Joo (singer)

=== 2016 ===
- [06/17] "Hustle" for Park Ki Ryang
- [06/17] "Lucky Charm" for Park Ki Ryang
- [06/17] "Scar" (흠집) for Park Ki Ryang

=== 2017 ===
- [06/07] "B.B.B.BOO" for Cosmic Girls

=== 2018 ===
- [05/30] "love4eva (feat. Grimes)" for Loona sub-unit yyxy
