= Bae Woo-hee =

South Korean singer and actress (born 1991)

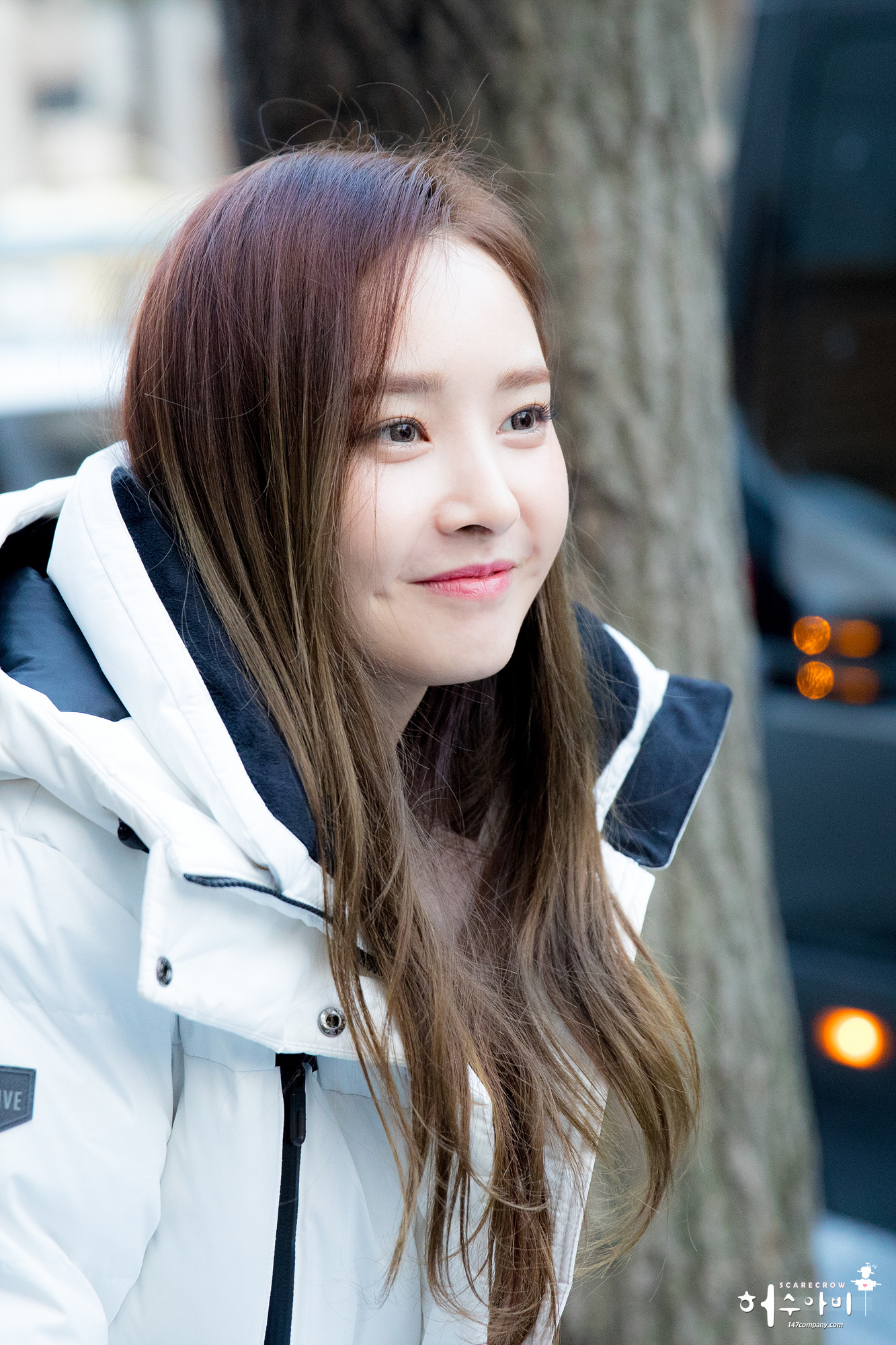
- Woohee in 2018
- Born: November 21, 1991 (age 34); Busan, South Korea
- Education: Dong-ah Institute of Media and Arts – Broadcasting and Entertainment
- Occupations: Singer; actress
- Relatives: Han Hye-rin (cousin)
- Musical career
- Genre: K-pop
- Instrument: Vocals
- Years active: 2012–present
- Label: Happy Face
- Formerly of: Viva Girls; Dal Shabet; Uni.T

Korean name
- Hangul: 배우희
- Hanja: 裴優熙
- RR: Bae Uhui
- MR: Pae Uhŭi

Bae Woo-hee (Korean: 배우희; born November 21, 1991), known professionally as Woohee, is a South Korean singer and actress. She is best known as a member of the South Korean girl group Dal Shabet and for finishing 7th in the show The Unit, making her a member of the girl group Uni.T.

== Early life and education ==
Bae Woo-hee was born on November 21, 1991, in Busan, South Korea. She currently attends Dong-ah Institute of Media and Arts, majoring in Broadcasting Entertainment.

== Career ==
=== Pre-debut ===
Bae was a trainee of the now defunct entertainment agency Medialine Entertainment, where she was slated to debut within the five-member girl group Viva Girls. The project was terminated in early 2011 due to financial difficulties within the agency.

Following her leave from Medialine Entertainment, Bae became a trainee under Happy Face Entertainment, and debuted with Dal Shabet in 2012.

=== 2012–2014: Career beginnings ===
On May 24, 2012, it was announced that Bae would be joining the pop girl group Dal Shabet, where she would be replacing former member Viki. Dal Shabet released their first teaser video of Woohee on June 1, 2012.

Bae wrote and composed the song "Maybe", a track from Dal Shabet's sixth extended play, Be Ambitious, which was released on June 20, 2013.

Bae collaborated with the band Every Single Day to release the track "Nap", which was included on the band's extended play Sky Bridge. The track was released on August 27, 2013, along with an accompanying music video, which Bae also appeared in. Bae made her acting debut in the 2013 SNS drama Infinite Power, where she played the recurring character Han Su-ja.

On November 14, 2013, Bae released her first solo track, "Towards Tomorrow", for the OST of the SNS drama Infinite Power.

On February 24, 2014, it was announced that Bae would be making her big screen debut through a cameo in the 3D horror movie Tunnel 3D.

Bae released "Hello My Love" on April 29, 2014, for the OST of the MBC's weekend drama, Jang Bo-ri is Here!.

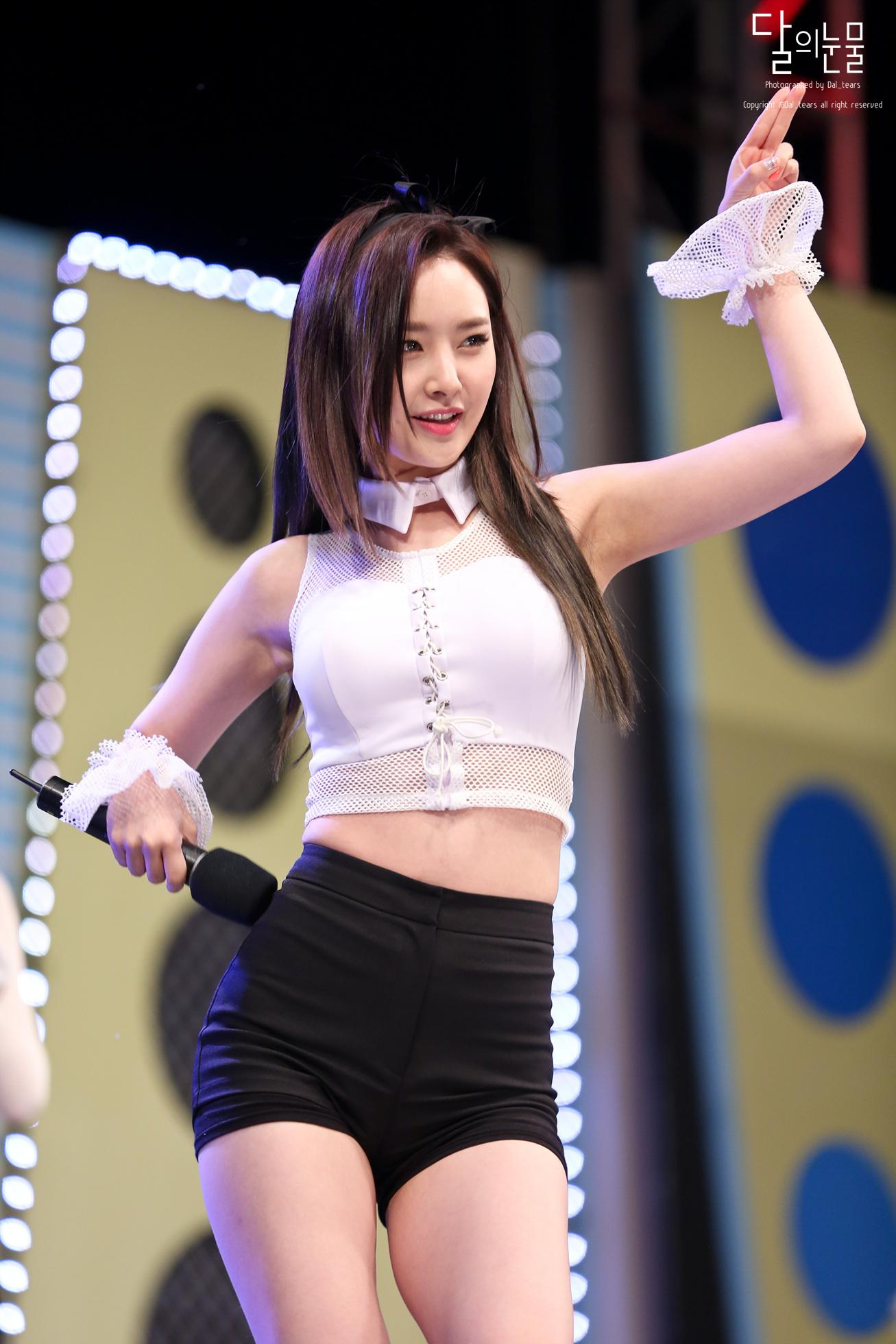
Bae performing in 2015

=== 2015–2016: Acting roles ===
In June 2015, Bae was cast in supporting roles in SBS' The Time We Were Not in Love.

On January 5, 2016, Bae released her second solo track, "Love Hurts", in Dal Shabet's ninth extended play, Naturalness.

=== 2017–present: The Unit and UNI.T ===
In 2017, Bae joined the KBS idol competition show The Unit: Idol Rebooting Project along with her fellow Dal Shabet member Serri. On February 10, 2018, during the final episode of The Unit, Bae placed seventh among female contestants and became a member of the final female line-up which was later revealed to be named Uni.T.

In 2022, Bae held a solo fan meeting Between Us at the Unexpected Theater in Seongbuk District, Seoul on July 29, 2022.

== Discography ==
| Year | Song | Album |
|---|---|---|
| 2013 | "Nap" | Skybridge |
| 2013 | "Towards Tomorrow" | Infinite Power OST |
| 2014 | "Hello My Love" | Jang Bo-ri is Here! OST |

== Filmography ==
=== Film ===
| Year | Title | Role | Notes | Ref. |
|---|---|---|---|---|
| 2014 | Tunnel 3D | Hye-young | Cameo | |
| 2022 | Wolves | | | |
| 2022 | Idol Recipe | Kelly | musical theater film | |

=== Television series ===
| Year | Title | Role | Notes | Ref. |
|---|---|---|---|---|
| 2011 | Dream High | Baek-hee's Kirin student | Cameo | |
| 2013 | Reply 1994 | Ha Hee-ra | Cameo (Episode 2) | |
| 2015 | The Lover | Herself as Ryu Seong Gyun's girlfriend | Cameo (Episode 6) | |
| 2015 | Persevere, Goo Hae-ra | Se-jong's college friend | Cameo (Episode 1) | |
| 2015 | The Time We Were Not in Love | Hong Eun-jung | | |
| 2019 | Home for Summer | Jin Soo-yeon | | |
| 2020 | Lonely Enough to Love | Kang Woo's patient | Cameo | |
| 2020 | Birthcare Center | Hee-won | | |
| 2021 | Times | Jo Yoo-jin | Cameo (Episode 3–4) | |
| 2022 | Business Proposal | Koh Yu-ra | | |
| 2022 | It's Beautiful Now | Yeon Na-young | Cameo | |

=== Web series ===
| Year | Title | Role | Notes | Ref. |
|---|---|---|---|---|
| 2013 | Infinite Power | Han Su-ja | | |
| 2016 | Everyday, New Face | Seul-bi | | |
| 2020 | Thumbs Up Feeds Me | Cha Eun-ha | | |
| 2020 | One Fine Week | Yoo Hwa-in | Season 2 | |
| 2022 | Two Universes | Seo Seo-hee | | |
| 2022 | Fantasy Spot | Min-ah | | |

== Theater ==
| Year | Title | Role | Ref. |
|---|---|---|---|
| 2022 | Oh Hae-Young Again | Oh Hae-young | |

== Awards and nominations ==
Name of the award ceremony, year presented, category, nominee of the award, and the result of the nomination
| Award ceremony | Year | Category | Nominee / Work | Result | Ref. |
|---|---|---|---|---|---|
| Korea Drama Awards | 2022 | Best New Actress | Business Proposal | Won | |
| Seoul Webfest | 2022 | Best Supporting Actress | Two Universes | Nominated | |
| Scene Stealer Festival | 2023 | Bonsang (Main Prize) | Business Proposal; Two Universes | Won | |
