= Dal Shabet =

South Korean girl group

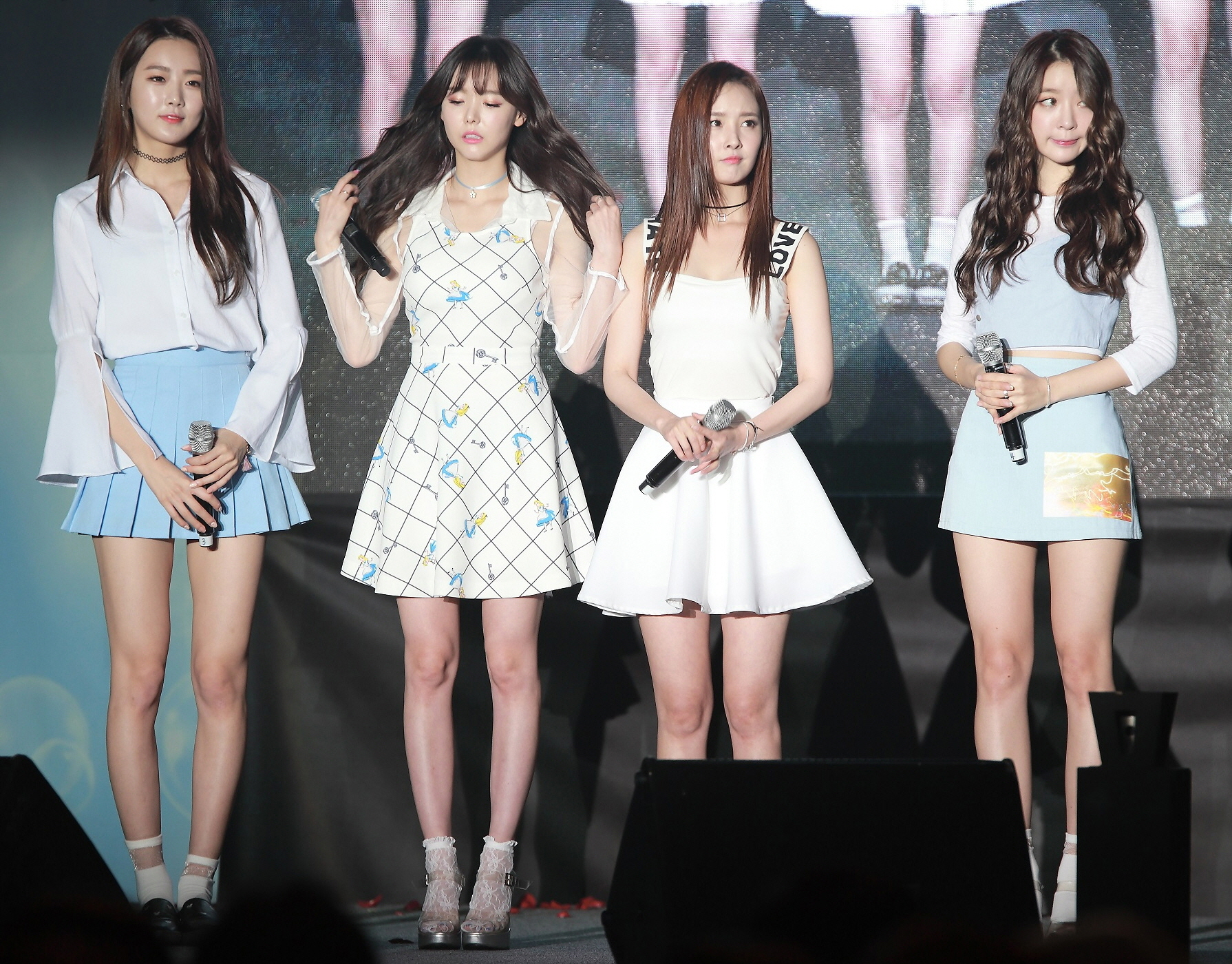
- Dal Shabet in 2016. L-R: Subin, Serri, Woohee, and Ah Young

Background information
- Origin: Seoul, South Korea
- Genres: K-pop; dance-pop; synth-pop
- Years active: 2011–2017; 2019
- Label: Dreamcatcher Company
- Members: Serri; Ah Young; Jiyul; Woohee; Kaeun; Subin
- Past members: Viki

Korean name
- Hangul: 달샤벳
- Lit.: Moon Sherbet
- RR: Dal Syabet
- MR: Tal Syabet

Dal Shabet (Korean: 달샤벳; stylized as Dal★Shabet or Dalshabet) is a South Korean girl group created by E-Tribe under Happy Face Entertainment. The group debuted on January 3, 2011, with the EP Supa Dupa Diva and with six members: Viki, Serri, Ah Young, Jiyul, Kaeun and Subin. Member Viki officially left in May 2012 and was replaced by Woohee.

Since their debut, Dal Shabet have released one studio album and ten extended plays. Their singles "Supa Dupa Diva", "Pink Rocket", "Bling Bling", "Hit U", "Mr. Bang Bang", "Be Ambitious (Look At My Legs)", "B.B.B (Big Baby Baby)", and "Joker" have all charted in the top twenty of the Gaon Digital Chart.

In December 2015, Members Jiyul and Kaeun left the group following the expiration of their contract. The group continued as a quartet and released two mini-albums Naturalness in January 2016 and Fri. Sat. Sun in September 2016 before member Serri, Ah Young and Subin left the company in December 2017, with Woohee following in December 2018. Happy Face stated that "the group has not disbanded and future activities of the group remains to be discussed."

In September 2019, Dal Shabet reunited as a six-piece and held a photo exhibition and mini-concert.

== Career ==
=== Pre-debut ===
During the latter half of 2010, rumors began to circulate through Korean media sites that E-Tribe, the producers behind breakthrough hits such as Girls' Generation's "Gee" and Lee Hyori's "U-Go-Girl", were planning to launch a new girl group. The producers quickly denied the rumors and said they were untrue. On December 9, 2010, E-Tribe's small-label company, Happy Face Entertainment, announced that they would be launching a six-member girl group named Dal Shabet. Profiles of the group members were revealed on December 29, 2010, as well as their debut date: January 3, 2011.

=== 2011: Debut, Pink Rocket and Bling Bling ===
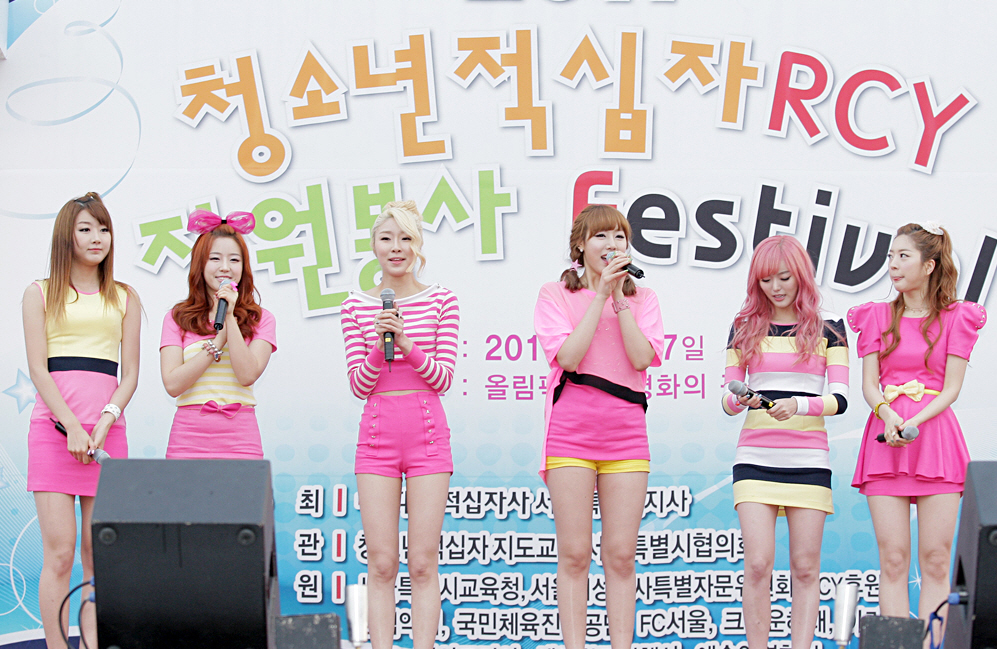
Dal Shabet at the Red Cross Youth Celebration Festival in 2011

Dal Shabet released their debut music video, "Supa Dupa Diva", on January 3, making them the first idol group to debut in 2011. Promotions for "Supa Dupa Diva" began on January 6 on M! Countdown. The song proved to be quite successful as it topped many real time and music station charts for the majority of its promotional period. Promotions for "Supa Dupa Diva" ended on March 14, but it was revealed that the group would be holding their first comeback in April. "Supa Dupa Diva" was later voted upon by various celebrities in a survey as the second most addicting song of 2011, as well as having the second most popular choreography.

On April 5, concept photos for Dal Shabet's first comeback track "Pink Rocket" were revealed. The concept, dubbed as "rocket girls", showed a more elegant and feminine side to the group. On April 13, the full-length music video to "Pink Rocket" was released. Promotions for "Pink Rocket" began the following day on M! Countdown. Promotions for "Pink Rocket" ended on May 30, but the group assured fans that they would be releasing another album in early August.

It was announced on August 2 that Dal Shabet would be making a "funky" comeback. During the entire first week of August, concept photos for each member was released. The outfits in the concept photos were quickly met with controversy and were deemed "too sexual" for live television, causing a complete overhaul of the concept. On August 10, Dal Shabet released their music video for "Bling Bling". Promotions for "Bling Bling" began on August 12 on Music Bank. The song proved to be their most successful yet, as it managed to break the top ten on the Gaon chart. Promotions for "Bling Bling" officially ended on November 6, but fans were assured the group would quickly return to the stage.

=== 2012: Hit U, line-up changes, Bang Bang and Have, Don't Have ===
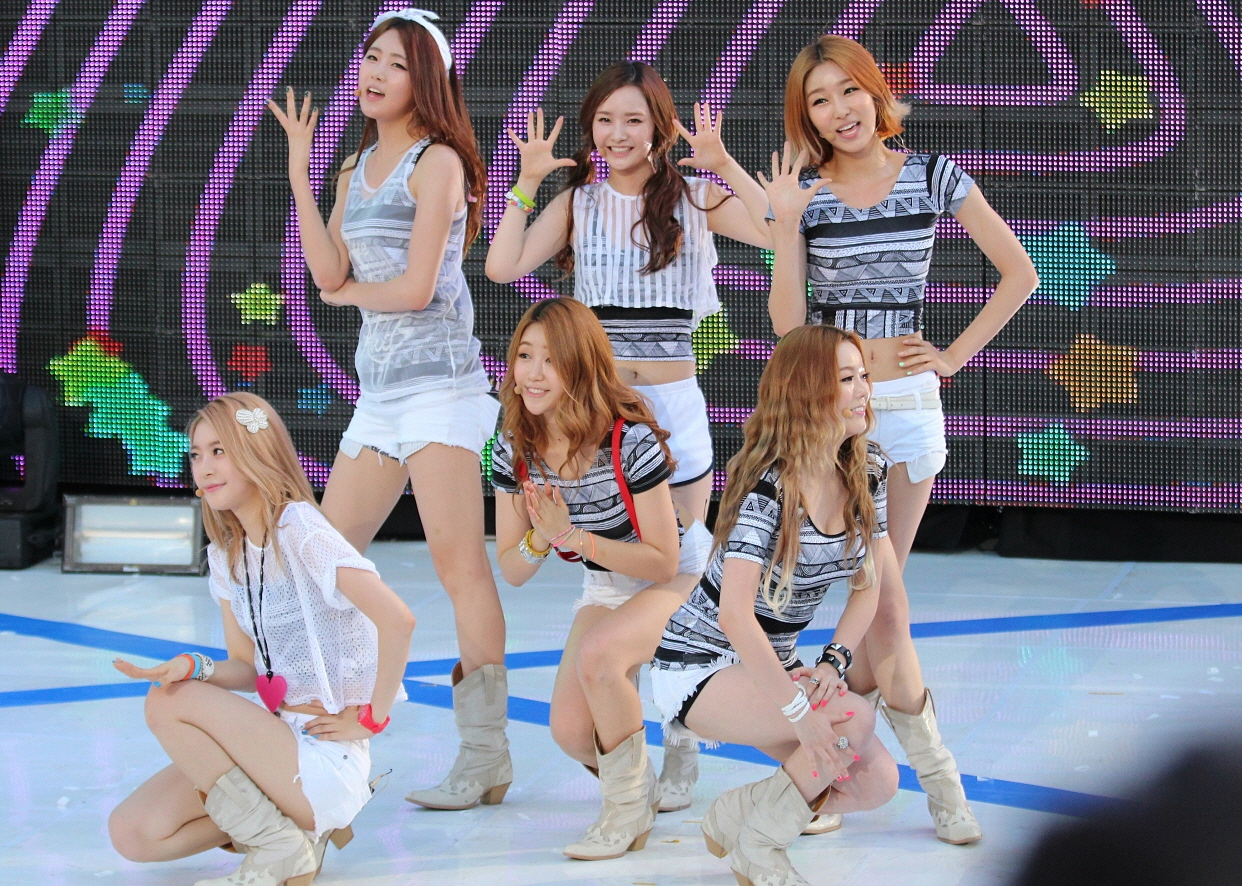
Dal Shabet at Super M Concert, on July 28, 2012

In early January, it was announced that Dal Shabet were to become the main models of Korean luxury brand 'SONOVI'.

On January 8, it was revealed that the members of Dal Shabet would be undergoing a dramatic and powerful transformation for their fourth EP. Promotions for "Hit U" began on January 26 on M! Countdown. The music video and EP were released digitally and physically the following day. The album went on to top the physical portion of the Gaon chart, securing Dal Shabet's first number one album. Promotions for "Hit U" ended on March 16, but the group confirmed they would be returning to the music scene in June.

On May 22, it was confirmed that the group would be releasing their first studio album on June 6. Three days later, a track list for the album was released, confirming the album's name to be BANG BANG. On May 23, it was announced that Viki would be leaving the group to continue her career as a solo artist. She was replaced with new member Woohee before the group had their comeback. It was later confirmed by a spokesperson for Dal Shabet's agency that Serri would be taking the position of leader.

On June 1, an introduction teaser featuring Woohee dancing to Beyoncé's "Freakum Dress" was released. On June 6, the music video and album were released. Promotions for "Mr. BangBang" began on M! Countdown the following day. Promotions for "Mr. BangBang" ended on the July 28 broadcast of Music Core. Dal Shabet confirmed they will be making their comeback sometime in November.

On October 24, the members of Dal Shabet were selected to be the main models of the Chinese smartphone brand 'VIVO'.

On November 13, Dal Shabet's fifth EP, Have, Don't Have, was released both physically and digitally. The music video for its title track of the same name was released shortly after. A second version of the music video was released the following day. Both videos were filmed with the help of Lee Si Uhn and 'Jongtuk and the Cheerful Men'. Promotions for the album's title track began on M! Countdown on November 15. Happy Face Entertainment called the song "a disco song that is easy for listeners to sing along to and the lyrics describe a girl's cute feelings towards a guy". On November 19, Dal Shabet released a surprise music video for "For Darling". The song and music video were Dal Shabet's special gift for their fans.

=== 2013: "It's You", Be Ambitious and controversy ===
On May 15, Dal Shabet released "It's You" for the SBS drama All About My Romance original soundtrack. The release serves as the main track of the entire soundtrack.

On May 28, it was announced that Dal Shabet would be releasing their new album on June 20. Their agency stated, “This album is perfect for the sweltering summer. The cool summer music will refresh you. They'll show you a side of themselves you've never seen before.” On June 17, it was announced that the lyrics to "Be Ambitious" were unfit for public broadcast due to sexual content and would have to be changed in order for the group to promote on television. Their company complied the same day and changed the lyrics in question. On June 19, Dal Shabet held a showcase event to celebrate the release of their sixth album. On June 20, the group physically and digitally released their sixth extended play to the public, along with an accompanying music video for "Be Ambitious". The group began promotions for their album the same day and performed a two-song comeback stage on Mnet's M! Countdown.

On July 1, men's rights group 'Man of Korea' filed an injunction to completely ban further distribution of "Be Ambitious". The group stated, "The lyrics and music video of "Be Ambitious" depreciate both women and men, and it's harmful to the youth. The music video also contains scenes that depreciate the 600,000 soldiers that are working hard in their enlistment." On July 11, Happy Face Entertainment and 'Man of Korea' held a joint conference, where they discussed the lawsuit. Following the conference, 'Man of Korea' officially announced they would be dropping their lawsuit against Dal Shabet's "Be Ambitious". Happy Face Entertainment stated, "There was no intention to depreciate the image of soldiers whatsoever, so we cleared up the misunderstanding through negotiation and peacefully came to an agreement."

On December 31, "Have, Don't Have" was determined to be the most played girl group song in Korean fashion stores for 2013.

=== 2014: B.B.B ===
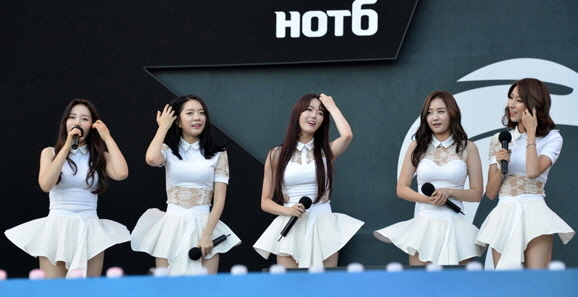
Dal Shabet at HOT6 LoL Summer 2014 Final

On December 15, 2013, Happy Face Entertainment announced that Dal Shabet were scheduled to make a comeback on January 8, 2014, and that a "shocking transformation" was planned for it. On January 5, the group appeared on the show Real Men, where they performed their unreleased title track for the troops. On January 8, Dal Shabet physically and digitally released B.B.B, along with the accompanying music video for its title track of the same name.

Following the filming of MBC Every 1's 9 to 6 on May 23, Subin was involved in a car accident in Busan while returning to Seoul. A representative from the relief center that responded to the accident reported, "On May 23, at about 7:30 PM, the van was overturned and completely wrecked. It was a serious accident." A second representative from the police department reported, "It looks to be negligent driving. We are currently investigating it." Subin was admitted to a nearby hospital and later moved to Seoul, where she underwent surgery for her injuries.

On September 26, Happy Face Entertainment announced that Dal Shabet was in the process of recording a new album for a comeback in late January 2015.

In October, Woohee was hospitalized and received surgery for a collapsed lung. She had reportedly received surgery for the same condition in the past and took a break from group activities to focus on recovering.

=== 2015: Joker Is Alive, Japan debut and line-up changes ===
Dal Shabet's eighth EP, Joker Is Alive, was released on April 15. The title track, "Joker", is a swing jazz dance song. In the music video, Dal Shabet portray female Harlequins who seduce the Joker, played by Lee Seung-ho. The music video was banned by KBS because of its explicit choreography, and the song's lyrics were censored by the network because the English word "joker" sounds similar to a Korean expletive.

Dal Shabet debuted in Japan on November 4 with their first single "Hard 2 Love" and greatest hits album The Best. "Hard 2 Love" debuted on the Oricon Chart at number 16 in the first day, and number 37 in its first week, selling 1737 copies.

On December 8, it was confirmed that members Jiyul and Kaeun would be leaving the group at by the end of the year after they decided not to renew their contracts with the company. The agency later announced that the group would possibly have a reunion with six members, and that the group would continue with the remaining four members to release a new album sometime on the beginning in 2016. A day later, Happy Face Entertainment also confirmed that Dal Shabet will be coming back as a 4-member group to celebrate their 5th anniversary on January 5, 2016. On December 21, Happy Face Entertainment released teaser images for their comeback and also announced that Dal Shabet will release their ninth mini-album, Naturalness, on January 5, 2016.

=== 2016: Naturalness, FRI. SAT. SUN. ===
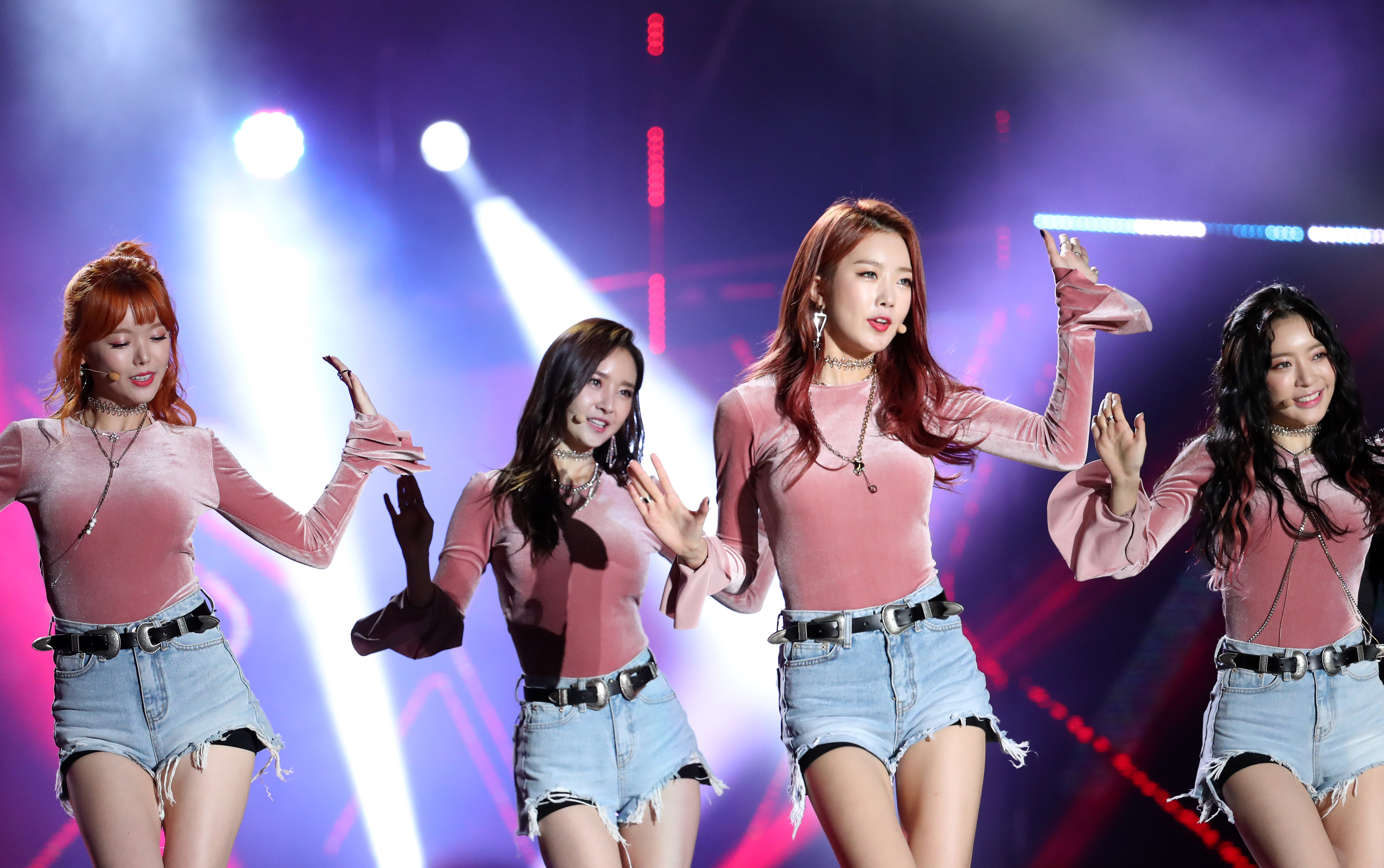
Dal Shabet performing at the Korea Sale Festa in 2016

On January 5, Dal Shabet released their ninth mini album, Naturalness, and the music video for its title track "Someone Like U". The mini album ranked #1 on Japan's Tower Record Charts and 4th on China's YinYueTai charts. Dal Shabet won "Asia's Best 3 New Artist" at the 2016 Japan Golden Disc Awards.

On February 13, it was announced that Dal Shabet will release a new single in the summer of 2016. However, it was later confirmed that the group would postpone the comeback until the fall so that they could create a mini album instead of a single.

On September 29, Dal Shabet released their 10th mini album FRI. SAT. SUN. containing five new songs, along with the music video for the title track under the same name.

=== 2017–2018: The Unit, departure from Happy Face and hiatus ===
On August 23, 2017, Happy Face Entertainment announced that Subin will be joining the reality television series The Unit. On September 7, Happy Face Entertainment announced Subin will be unable to appear on the show due to conflict with an overseas schedule and will be replaced by Serri and Woohee to appear on the show.

On December 14, Happy Face Entertainment announced that members Serri, Subin, and Ah Young decided to leave the company after their contracts expired to focus on their own careers. Following the expiration of contracts, the group was said to not be disbanded and future activities of the four-member group remains to be discussed. The company also said it will continue to support Serri's appearance on The Unit until the end. On the same day, SidusHQ announced that Ah Young had signed a contract with them and would be debuting as an actress.

On February 3, 2018, Serri was eliminated from The Unit on episode 13 after placing 23rd. Woohee would go on to place seventh in the final ranking, qualifying her to debut with the show's female team UNI.T.

On February 6, it was announced Subin had signed a contract with KeyEast to be an actress and singer.

On December 5, it was reported that Woohee's contract with HappyFace had expired.

=== 2019: Reunion as six members, concert and photo exhibition ===
On January 6, Dal Shabet members shared on social media a series of photos and videos from their meeting during which they celebrated their 8th anniversary. Jiyul and Kaeun, who were also present, introduced themselves as Dal Shabet members as well. The group continued to meet and support each other in their solo activities throughout the whole year, along with the two former members, starting the rumors about the group's possible reunion as six.

In August, Serri stated in an interview for BNT that even though "Dal Shabet isn't promoting, we haven't disbanded". She also confirmed the rumors about the group's reunion and shared the news about the preparation of a photo exhibition dedicated to Dal Shabet and a special concert where all six members including the ones who left would get together to give a performance.

The photo exhibition along with a mini-concert was announced on September 2 through various news sites. It was revealed that the exhibition would take place in Seoul, Seocho District in Gallery K from September 29 to October 5 and the mini-concert would be held on the last day of the event. The event was revealed to be named "Be Ambitious", after the group's seventh single. Dal Shabet members shared the news on their personal Instagram accounts the same day. Jiyul and Kaeun announced their participation as well thus confirming that they had rejoined the group.

Throughout the years, leader Serri has shared multiple times through her social media accounts and interviews that the group hopes for another reunion or comeback. On January 7, 2025, she expressed her wish again, sharing new of the members' latest reunion discussing potential projects together despite being in different companies. On August 23, 2025, four members (Serri, Ah Young, Woohee, Subin) performed at the '2025 CassCool Festival' held at Seoul Land in Gwacheon and it was the first time in 7 years since their last promotions.

== Members ==
Current

- Serri (세리)
- Ah Young (아영)
- Jiyul (지율)
- Woohee (우희)
- Kaeun (가은)
- Subin (수빈)

Former

- Viki (비키)

== Discography ==
=== Korean studio albums ===
- Bang Bang (2012)

=== Korean extended plays ===
- Supa Dupa Diva (2011)
- Pink Rocket (2011)
- Bling Bling (2011)
- Hit U (2012)
- Have, Don't Have (2012)
- Be Ambitious (2013)
- B.B.B (2014)
- Joker Is Alive (2015)
- Naturalness (2016)
- Fri. Sat. Sun (2016)

== Filmography ==
=== Movies ===
Year	Title	Role
2012	Wonderful Radio	Corby Girls (Cameo)

=== Television dramas ===
Year	Title	Network	Role
2011	Dream High	KBS2	Kirin Students (Cameo)

=== Reality shows ===
Year	Title	Network
2011	Sweet Sweet Story	KukiTV
2011	Cool Friends	SBS MTV
2014	A Date with K-pop Stars	MediaCorp, Channel M

== Awards and nominations ==
Year presented, name of the award ceremony, award category and the result of the nomination
Year	Program	Category	Result	Ref.
2011	19th Republic of Korea Entertainment News Awards	Popularity Award	Won	
2011	2011 Bugs Music Awards	Best Rookie	Won	
2011	Soompi Gayo Awards	Top 50 Songs – #41	Won	
2011	Soompi Gayo Awards	Top New Artists of 2011	Won	
2011	13th Mnet Asian Music Awards	Best New Female Artists	Nominated	
2012	GALLUP Korea	Best New Female Group of 2011	Won	
2012	26th Golden Disk Awards	New Artist Award	Won	
2012	Ministry of Health and Welfare	Campaigning Award	Won	
2012	allkpop awards	Rising Star Award	Won	
2013	Homme Music Award	#1 Played Song	Won	
2016	Japan Gold Disc Award	Best New Asian Artist	Won	
2016	MAXIM K-Model Award	Best Cover Model Award	Won	
