= Vikki =

Vikki is a feminine given name. It is sometimes a nickname for Victoria. Notable people with the name include:

- Vikki, a UK singer in the 1985 Eurovision Song Contest, now known as Aeone
- Vikki Blanche, born 1966 or 1967, Australian actor and director
- Vikki Bunce (born 1983), field hockey forward
- Vikki Carr, stage name of Mexican-American singer Florencia Vicenta de Casillas-Martinez Cardona (born 1941)
- Vikki de Vries (born 1964), American figure skater
- Vikki Hubbard (born 1989), English high jumper
- Vikki LaMotta (1930–2005), born Beverly Thailer, American wife of boxer Jake LaMotta
- Vikki McGinn (born 1985), Irish rugby union player
- Vikki Moss (born 1962), Canadian singer
- Vikki Mongeon (born 1981), American model and television personality
- Vikki Petraitis (born 1965), Australian true crime author
- Vikki Slowe (born 1947), English printmaker and painter
- Vikki Stone (born 1985), English stand-up comedian, actress and musician
- Vikki Thorn, Australian harmonica player, guitarist, vocalist, and songwriter
- Vikki Wakefield (born 1970), Australian young adult fiction writer
