= Supa Dupa Diva =

Mini-album by Dal Shabet

EP by Dal Shabet
- Released: January 4, 2011
- Recorded: Happy Face Studio, Seoul, South Korea; 2010
- Genres: K-pop; dance-pop
- Length: 15:09
- Labels: Happy Face; Sony Music Korea
- Producer: E-Tribe

Dal Shabet chronology
Supa Dupa Diva (2011)	Pink Rocket (2011)

Singles from Supa Dupa Diva
- 1. "Supa Dupa Diva" Released: January 4, 2011

Supa Dupa Diva is the first extended play and debut major release by South Korean girl group Dal Shabet, released January 4, 2011. "Supa Dupa Diva" was used as the lead single. Promotions began on January 6. on M! Countdown.

== Track listing ==
No.	Title	Lyrics	Music	Arrangement	Length
1.	"Dal Shabet"	Bigtone, E-Tribe	E-Tribe	E-Tribe	2:13
2.	"Supa Dupa Diva"	E-Tribe	E-Tribe	E-Tribe, 장준호	3:01
3.	"매력덩어리 (Hottie)"	E-Tribe	E-Tribe	E-Tribe	3:17
4.	"Oh! Wow!"	Koonta	구자경, 이호승	구자경, 이호승	3:32
5.	"Supa Dupa Diva (Inst.)"		E-Tribe	E-Tribe, 장준호	3:01

== Chart performance ==
Chart	Peak Position
Gaon Weekly Album Chart	9
Gaon Monthly Album Chart	40

=== Sales and certifications ===
Chart (2011)	Amount	Ref
Gaon physical sales	2,300+	
