= Dreamcatcher Company =

South Korean company

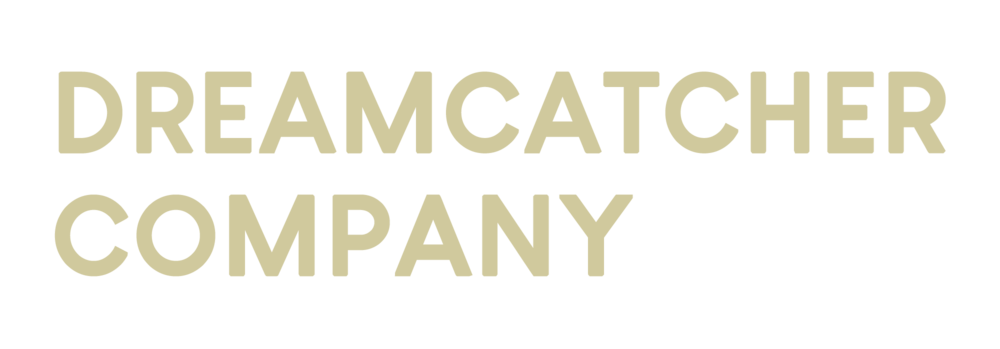
- Native name: 드림캐쳐 컴퍼니
- Formerly: Harvest Entertainment (2008–2009); Happyface Entertainment (2009–2019)
- Predecessor: Happy Face Entertainment
- Founded: August 15, 2008
- Headquarters: Seoul, South Korea
- Number of locations: Sajin Building, Seolleung-ro 112gil 8, Gangnam-gu
- Key people: Lee Joowon 이주원 (Chief Executive Officer); Hwang Sooyeon 황수연 (Performance Director)
- Subsidiaries: HF Music Company

Dreamcatcher Company is a South Korean entertainment company established in 2008.

== History ==
=== 2008–2010: Establishment, name change and mainstream breakthrough ===
The label was established on August 15, 2008, as Harvest Entertainment (풍년 엔터테인먼트) by Lee Joowon. The label changed their name to Happyface Entertainment (해피페이스 엔터테인먼트) on January 23, 2009.

The agency debuted their first artist, Nassun, through Lee Hyo-ri's 2008 hit U-Go-Girl, which was produced by E-Tribe. This single launched E-Tribe, Nassun, and the agency into mainstream popularity.

On January 5, 2009, Girls' Generation released the single Gee, which was produced by E-Tribe. The single charted at number one on South Korea's Gaon Chart for two months and claimed over ten year-end awards. A Japanese version of the song was released in 2010 with composition credited to E-Tribe.

Rap-pop duo One Two (previously established in 2003), signed a contract with Happyface Entertainment in early 2009. The duo released "Starry Night", "Bad Girl (ft. Seo In-young), "Walala Lalale", and "Very Good" before their disbandment in late 2010.

The agency briefly worked with HybRefine and Sanchez, now known as Phantom, in 2010 to produce the singles "You Can Fly", "Cosmic Dance", "Rain U", and "Sanchez-San Toi".

=== 2011–2015: Debuting artist, joint venture and development ===
Following the success of E-Tribe's productions, the label made the decision to debut their first idol girl group, Dal Shabet.

On May 4, 2011, it was announced that Happyface Entertainment would be merging with Y-WHO Enterprise, a small entertainment agency founded by ex-4men member, and current Vibe member, Yoon Min-soo. With the merger, Y-WHO Enterprise artists 4men, Bebe Mignon and MIIII officially became label-mates of Nassun and Dal Shabet.

In mid-2012, it was revealed that Bebe Mignon members Haegeum and Park Ga-Eul had left Happyface Entertainment, effectively disbanding the group. Member Ben has since been re-debuted by the agency as a solo artist.

Actress Yeon Mi-Ju of the hit television series Lovers signed an exclusive contract with Happyface Entertainment on May 21, 2014.

On July 31, 2014, famous breakdancer and recording artist Nam Hyun-joon and his wife Park Aeri joined the company.

In September 2014, Happyface Entertainment debuted MINX, its first girl group since Dal Shabet three years prior.

In 2015, returning vocal group V.O.S. signed with Happyface for their comeback.

=== 2017–present: Dreamcatcher, sub-labels and second name change ===
In January 2017, Happyface Entertainment re-formed MINX to be a seven-member girl group as Dreamcatcher.

Happyface Entertainment launched their first sub-label, HF Music Company.

On January 31, 2017, Kpop Star 5 contestant Lee Si-eun signed an exclusive contract with HF Music Company.

In August 2017, the label debuted trio Classmate.

In December 2017, Dal Shabet members Serri, Subin and Ah Young parted ways with the company following the expiration of their contracts. The group, however, was said to not be disbanded, and future activities of the four-member group remains to be discussed.

In June 2018, Woo Jin-young finished first place on Mixnine. The company filed a lawsuit against YG following the cancellation of the group that was set to debut.

On February 13, 2019, Happyface Entertainment announced they will rename to Dreamcatcher Company.

In March 2019, following announcement of D1CE's debut, a sub-label named D1CE Company (디원스컴퍼니) was set up.

In November 2022, all seven members of Dreamcatcher renewed their contracts early, before the end of their existing contracts.

In January 2023, D1CE disbanded after 3 years and 5 months.

== Artists ==
=== Groups ===
- Dreamcatcher
  - UAU
- Thessyndrome
- ChRocktikal

=== Soloists ===
- Siyeon (Dreamcatcher)
- Hwang Sooyeon

=== Producers ===
- Nu;face

=== Singer-songwriters ===
- Siyeon
- JiU
- Yoohyeon
- SuA
- Byeong Min

=== Actors ===
- Lee Seung-ho

== Former artists ==
Recording artists

- One Two (2009–2010)
- HybRefine (2010–2011)
- Sanchez (2010–2011)
- Bebe Mignon (2010–2012)
  - Haegeum (2010–2012)
  - Park Ga-eul (2010–2012)
- E-Tribe (2008–2012)
- Dal Shabet
  - Viki (2011–2012)
  - Jiyul (2011–2015)
  - Kaeun (2011–2015)
  - Serri (2011–2017)
  - Ah Young (2011–2017)
  - Subin (2011–2017)
  - Woohee (2012–2018)
- 4Men (2011–2017)
  - Kim Young-jae (2008–2014)
- Ben (2011–2017)
- MIIII (2011–2017)
- V.O.S (2015–2017)
- Nam Hyun-joon
- Park Aeri
- HNB
- Lee Si Eun (2017-2022)
- D1ce (2019–2023)
- Dreamcatcher
  - Dami (2014–2025)
  - Handong (2017–2025)
  - Gahyun (2017–2025)

Producers

- E-Tribe (2009–2012)

Actors

- Yeon Mi-ju (2014–????)
- Kim Ji-sung
