= Dreamcatcher discography =

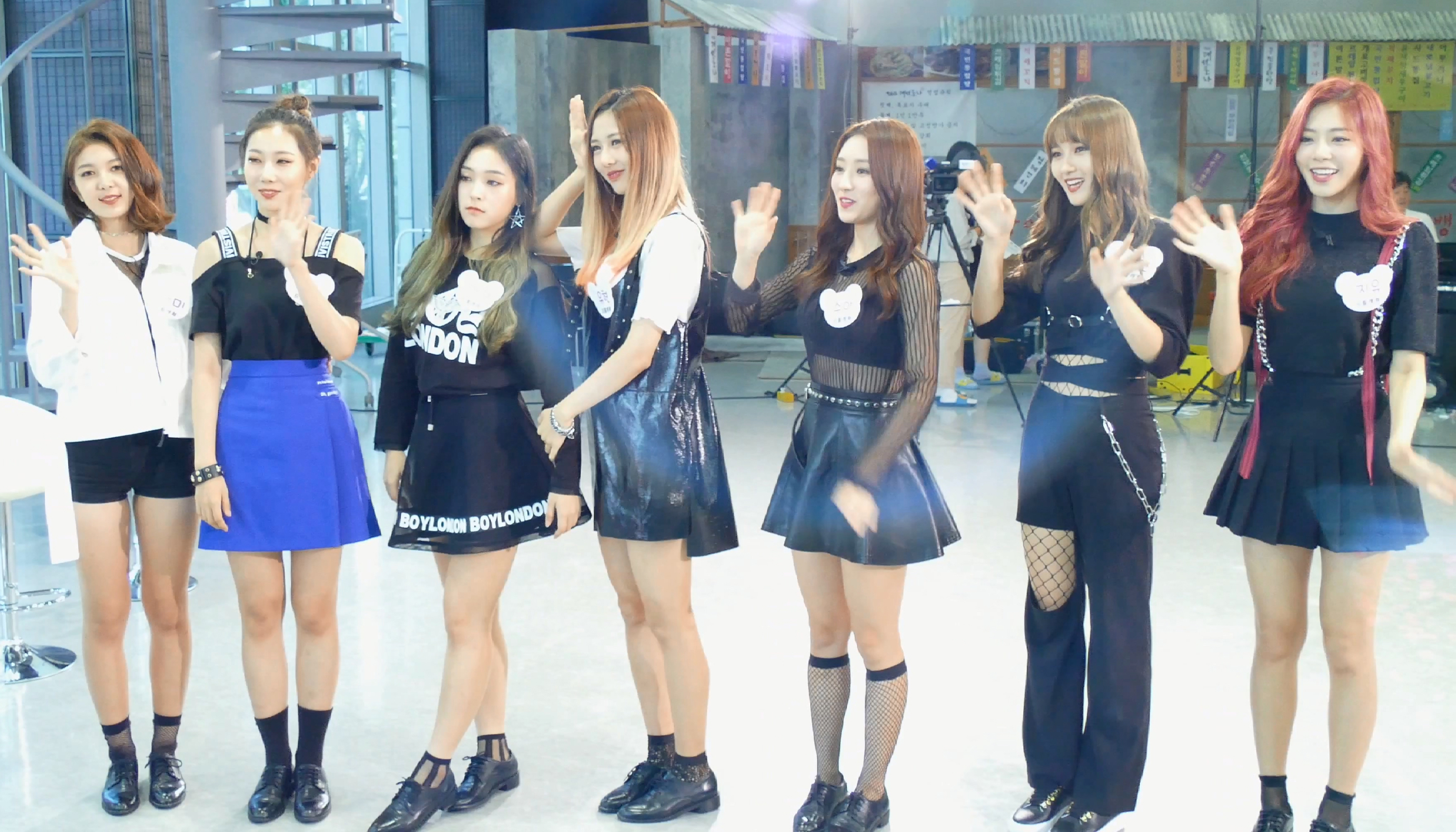
- Dreamcatcher in 2017
- Studio albums: 3
- EPs: 13 (1 as MINX)
- Singles: 26 (2 as MINX)
- Music videos: 34 (3 as MINX)
- Single albums: 6 (1 as MINX)
- Collaborations: 1
- Soundtrack appearances: 5

South Korean girl group Dreamcatcher have released three studio albums, thirteen extended plays, six single albums and twenty-six digital singles.

== Studio albums ==
List of studio albums, with selected details, chart positions, and sales
Title	Album details	Peak chart positions				Sales
Title	Album details	KOR	FIN	JPN	JPN Hot	Sales
Korean
Dystopia: The Tree of Language	Released: February 18, 2020; Label: Dreamcatcher Company; Formats: CD, digital download	3	—	—	—	KOR: 59,899
Apocalypse: Save Us	Released: April 12, 2022; Label: Dreamcatcher Company; Formats: CD, digital download	4	26	—	—	KOR: 142,246
Japanese
The Beginning of the End	Released: September 11, 2019; Label: Pony Canyon; Formats: CD, digital download; Track listing: 1. "Intro"; 2. "Breaking Out"; 3. "My Way ～Kono Michi no Sakie～" (～この道の先へ～); 4. "Chase Me" -Japanese ver.-; 5. "Good Night" -Japanese ver.-; 6. "Wonderland" -Japanese ver.-; 7. "Piri～Fue wo fuke～" (～笛を吹け～) -Japanese ver.-; 8. "What" -Japanese ver.-; 9. "I Miss You"; 10. "Mata Hitori ni Natta" (また一人になった) ‐Japanese ver.‐; 11. "You and I" ‐Japanese ver.‐; 12. "Outro"; DVD The End ver.: 1. "Breaking Out" (Music Video & Making Video); 2. "Piri ~Fue wo Fuke~" (～笛を吹け～) -Japanese ver.- (Music Video & Making Video DVD The Beginning ver.); 3. Asia Tour "Invitation From the Nightmare City in Japan" (Tokyo Kinema Club 2019.5.2) (東京キネマ倶楽部2019.5.2)	—	—	7	13	JPN: 4,399
"—" denotes an album that did not chart or was not released.

== Single albums ==
List of single albums, with selected details, chart positions, and sales
Title	Album details	Peak chart positions		Sales
Title	Album details	KOR	US World	Sales
Korean
Why Did You Come to My Home (as MINX)	Released: September 22, 2014; Label: Happy Face Entertainment; Formats: Digital download, promo CD; Track listing: 1. "Why Did You Come to My Home?" (우리 집에 왜 왔니); 2. "Why Did You Come to My Home?" (우리 집에 왜 왔니) (Inst.)	—	—	—
Nightmare	Released: January 13, 2017; Label: Happy Face Entertainment; Formats: CD, digital download	11	—	KOR: 21,262
Fall Asleep in the Mirror	Released: April 5, 2017; Label: Happy Face Entertainment; Formats: CD, digital download; Track listing: 1. "My Toys" (Intro); 2. "Good Night"; 3. "Lullaby"; 4. "Good Night" (Inst.)	7	—	KOR: 26,110
Luck Inside 7 Doors	Released: March 8, 2024; Label: Dreamcatcher Company; Formats: Digital download; Track listing: 1. "Lullaby" (2024 Concert Ver.); 2. "The Curse of the Spider" (거미의 저주) (2024 Concert Ver.)	—	—	—
My Christmas Sweet Love	Released: December 20, 2024; Label: Dreamcatcher Company; Formats: Digital download; Track listing: 1. "My Christmas Sweet Love"; 2. "Jazz Bar" (Carol ver.); 3. "Wonderland" (Carol ver.)	7	—	KOR: 31,028
Japanese
Eclipse	Released: March 24, 2021; Label: Pony Canyon; Formats: CD, digital download; Track listing: 1. "Eclipse"; 2. "No More"; 3. "Don't Light My Fire"; 4. "Eclipse" (Inst.); 5. "No More" (Inst.); 6. "Don't Light My Fire" (Inst.)	—	—	—
"—" denotes a recording that did not chart or was not released in that territory.

== Extended plays ==
List of extended plays, with selected details, chart positions, and sales
Title	EP details	Peak chart positions					Sales
Title	EP details	KOR	FRA Down.	JPN	FIN	US World	Sales
Love Shake (as MINX)	Released: July 2, 2015; Label: Happy Face Entertainment; Formats: CD, digital download; Track listing: 1. "Superstar Superman"; 2. "Love Shake"; 3. "I Like You" (나도 너처럼); 4. "Shut Up"; 5. "Love Shake" (DJ Stereo Club Mix); 6. "Love Shake" (Inst.)	11	—	—	—	—	KOR: 1,813
Prequel (Note: Prequel was released in Japan on September 15, 2017 by Marvel Entertainment.)	Released: July 27, 2017; Label: Happy Face Entertainment; Formats: CD, digital download; Track listing: 1. "Before & After" (Intro); 2. "Fly High" (날아올라); 3. "Wake Up"; 4. "Sleep-walking"; 5. "Trust Me!" (괜찮아!); 6. "Fly High" (날아올라) (Inst.)	4	—	36	—	5	KOR: 11,268; JPN: 3,169
Escape the Era	Released: May 10, 2018; Label: Happy Face Entertainment; Formats: CD, digital download; Track listing: 1. "Inside-Outside" (Intro); 2. "You and I"; 3. "Mayday"; 4. "Which a Star" (어느별); 5. "Scar"; 6. "You and I" (Inst.)	3	—	29	—	7	KOR: 25,436; JPN: 4,226
Alone in the City	Released: September 20, 2018; Label: Happy Face Entertainment; Formats: CD, digital download; Track listing: 1. "Intro"; 2. "What"; 3. "Wonderland"; 4. "Trap"; 5. "July 7th" (약속해 우리); 6. "What" (Inst.)	2	197	—	—	7	KOR: 38,152; JPN: 2,960
The End of Nightmare	Released: February 13, 2019; Label: Dreamcatcher Company; Formats: CD, digital download; Track listing: 1. "Intro"; 2. "Piri"; 3. "Diamond"; 4. "And There Is No One Left" (그리고 아무도 없었다); 5. "Daydream" (백일몽); 6. "Piri" (Inst.)	3	138	43	—	6	KOR: 31,538; JPN: 2,821
Raid of Dream	Released: September 18, 2019; Label: Dreamcatcher Company; Formats: CD, digital download; Track listing: 1. "Intro"; 2. "Deja Vu" (데자부); 3. "The Curse of the Spider" (거미의 저주); 4. "Silent Night"; 5. "Polaris" (북극성); 6. "Deja Vu" (Japanese ver.)	3	84	—	—	10	KOR: 34,780
Dystopia: Lose Myself	Released: August 17, 2020; Label: Dreamcatcher Company; Formats: CD, digital download	3	—	—	—	—	KOR: 104,309
Dystopia: Road to Utopia	Released: January 26, 2021; Label: Dreamcatcher Company; Formats: CD, digital download	1	—	—	—	—	KOR: 129,797
Summer Holiday	Released: July 30, 2021; Label: Dreamcatcher Company; Formats: CD, digital download	2	—	—	9	—	KOR: 130,665
Apocalypse: Follow Us	Released: October 11, 2022; Label: Dreamcatcher Company, Sony Music, Epic; Formats: CD, digital download	4	—	—	—	—	KOR: 119,829
Apocalypse: From Us	Released: May 24, 2023; Label: Dreamcatcher Company; Formats: CD, digital download	7	—	—	—	—	KOR: 118,716
Villains	Released: November 22, 2023; Label: Dreamcatcher Company; Formats: CD, digital download	3	—	—	—	—	KOR: 126,507
Virtuous	Released: July 10, 2024; Label: Dreamcatcher Company; Formats: CD, digital download	6	—	—	—	—	KOR: 124,082
"—" denotes releases that did not chart or were not released in that region.

== Singles ==
List of singles, with selected chart positions, showing year released, sales, and album name
Title	Year	Peak chart positions					Sales	Album
Title	Year	KOR	KOR Hot	JPN	JPN Hot	US World	Sales	Album
Minx
"Why Did You Come to My Home?" (우리 집에 왜 왔니?)	2014	—	—	—	—	—	—	Why Did You Come to My Home
"Love Shake"	2015	— (Note: "Love Shake" did not enter the Gaon Digital Chart, but appeared at number 190 on the component Download Chart.)	*	—	—	—	KOR: 6,511 (Dig.)	Love Shake
Dreamcatcher
"Chase Me"	2017	—	—	—	—	—	—	Nightmare
"Good Night"	2017	—	—	—	—	23	—	Fall Asleep in the Mirror
"Fly High" (날아올라)	2017	—	—	—	—	—	—	Prequel
"Full Moon"	2018	—	—	—	—	16	—	Dystopia: The Tree of Language
"You and I"	2018	—	—	—	—	9	—	Escape the Era
"What" (Note: "What (Japanese ver.)" was released on November 21, 2018 as the group's Japanese debut single.)	2018	—	—	12	55	8	JPN: 8,086 (Phy.)	Alone in the City
"Over the Sky" (하늘을 넘어)	2019	—	—	—	—	—	—	Dystopia: The Tree of Language
"Piri" (Note: "Piri ~Fue wo Fuke~ (Japanese ver.)" was released on March 13, 2019 as the group's second Japanese single.)	2019	— (Note: "Piri" did not enter the Gaon Digital Chart, but appeared at number 123 on the component Download Chart.)	—	13	87	12	JPN: 6,556 (Phy.)	The End of Nightmare
"Deja Vu" (데자부)	2019	— (Note: "Deja Vu" did not enter the Gaon Digital Chart, but appeared at number 119 and 97 on the component Download and BGM charts, respectively.)	96	—	—	12	—	Raid of Dream
"Scream"	2020	— (Note: "Scream" did not enter the Gaon Digital Chart, but appeared at number 88 and 97 on the component Download and BGM charts, respectively.)	99	—	—	6	—	Dystopia: The Tree of Language
"Endless Night"	2020	—	—	13	— (Note: "Endless Night" did not enter the Billboard Japan Hot 100 Chart, but appeared at number 10 on the component Billboard Japan Top Singles Sales chart.)	—	JPN: 3,633 (Phy.)	Non-album single
"Boca"	2020	— (Note: "Boca" did not enter the Gaon Digital Chart, but appeared at number 58 on the component Download chart.)	94	—	—	11	—	Dystopia: Lose Myself
"No More"	2020	—	—	—	—	—	—	Eclipse
"Odd Eye"	2021	— (Note: "Odd Eye" did not enter the Gaon Digital Chart, but appeared at number 12 on the component Download chart.)	—	—	—	5	—	Dystopia: Road to Utopia
"Eclipse"	2021	—	—	17	— (Note: "Eclipse" did not enter the Billboard Japan Hot 100 Chart, but appeared at number 09 on the component Billboard Japan Top Singles Sales chart.)	—	JPN: 2,593 (Phy.)	Eclipse
"BEcause"	2021	— (Note: "BEcause" did not enter the Gaon Digital Chart, but appeared at number 37 on the component Download chart.)	—	—	—	6	—	Summer Holiday
"Maison"	2022	— (Note: "Maison" did not enter the Gaon Digital Chart, but appeared at number 10 on the component Download chart.)	—	—	—	—	—	Apocalypse: Save Us
"Vision"	2022	— (Note: "Vision" did not enter the Circle Digital Chart, but appeared at number 22 and 42 on the component Download and BGM charts, respectively.)	*	—	—	—	—	Apocalypse: Follow Us
"Reason"	2023	— (Note: "Reason" did not enter the Circle Digital Chart, but appeared at number 38 on the component Download chart, respectively.)	*	—	—	—	—	Non-album single
"Bonvoyage"	2023	— (Note: "Bonvoyage" did not enter the Circle Digital Chart, but appeared at number 10 and 7 on the component Download and BGM charts, respectively.)	*	—	—	—	—	Apocalypse: From Us
"Bonvoyage" (Farewell Ver.)	2023	—	*	—	—	—	—	Non-album single
"OOTD"	2023	— (Note: "OOTD" did not enter the Circle Digital Chart, but appeared at number 18 on the component Download chart)	*	—	—	—	—	Villains
"Justice"	2024	— (Note: "Justice" did not enter the Circle Digital Chart, but appeared at number 11 on the component Download chart)	—	—	—	—	—	Virtuous
"My Christmas Sweet Love"	2024	—	—	—	—	—	—	Non-album single
"—" denotes a recording that did not chart or was not released in that territory. "*" denotes a chart did not exist at that time.

== Collaborations ==
Title	Year	Album
"Be the Future" (with AleXa and In2It) (as Millenasia Project)	2020	Non-album single

== Soundtrack appearances ==
Title	Year	Album
"Two of Us" (Siyeon, Onejunn of Boys Republic)	2014	Love & Secret OST, Pt. 2
"R.o.S.E Blue" (produced by ESTi)	2020	Non-album single (Note: Original soundtrack for mobile game Girl Cafe Gun)
"Good Sera" (Siyeon)	2020	Memorials OST, Pt. 1
"No Mind" (정신이 하나 없어) (Siyeon)	2020	Get Revenge OST, Pt. 1
"Shadow" (Siyeon, Dami)	2021	Dark Hole OST, Pt. 2
"Still with You" (SuA)	2022	Café Minamdang OST, Pt. 7
"Don't Go Back" (Siyeon)	2024	Queen of Divorce OST, Pt. 2
"Runaway" (Siyeon)	2024	Red Swan (TV series) OST, Pt. 5
"Daisy" (JiU, Yoohyeon)	2024	Brewing Love OST, Pt. 6
"Wings of Steel" (Siyeon)	2025	Elsword OST, Doom Aporia Raid

== Compilation appearances ==
Title	Year	Album
"To DJ (Yoon Si Nae)" (DJ에게 (윤시내))	2018	Immortal Song 2: Singing the Legend (KBS Top10 Songs)

== Other charted songs ==
List of singles, with selected chart positions, showing year released, sales, and album name
Title	Year	Peak chart positions	Album
Title	Year	KOR	Album
"Wind Blows" (바람아)	2021	— (Note: "Wind Blows" did not enter the Gaon Digital Chart, but appeared at number 54 on the component Download chart.)	Dystopia: Road to Utopia
"Poison Love"	2021	— (Note: "Poison Love" did not enter the Gaon Digital Chart, but appeared at number 74 on the component Download chart.)	Dystopia: Road to Utopia
"4 Memory"	2021	— (Note: "4 Memory" did not enter the Gaon Digital Chart, but appeared at number 49 on the component Download chart.)	Dystopia: Road to Utopia
"New Days" (시간의 틈)	2021	— (Note: "New Days" did not enter the Gaon Digital Chart, but appeared at number 53 on the component Download chart.)	Dystopia: Road to Utopia
"Airplane"	2021	— (Note: "Airplane" did not enter the Gaon Digital Chart, but appeared at number 112 on the component Download chart.)	Summer Holiday
"Whistle"	2021	— (Note: "Whistle" did not enter the Gaon Digital Chart, but appeared at number 94 on the component Download chart.)	Summer Holiday
"Alldaylong"	2021	— (Note: "Alldaylong" did not enter the Gaon Digital Chart, but appeared at number 110 on the component Download chart.)	Summer Holiday
"A Heart of Sunflower" (해바라기의 마음)	2021	— (Note: "A Heart of Sunflower" did not enter the Gaon Digital Chart, but appeared at number 117 on the component Download chart.)	Summer Holiday
"—" denotes a recording that did not chart or was not released in that territory.
