= UAU =

UAU may refer to:

- British Universities and Colleges Sport, Universities Athletic Union
- Uttarakhand Ayurved University, a state health sciences university in Uttarakhand, India
- A codon for the amino acid tyrosine
- UAU (group), a subunit of the South Korean girl group Dreamcatcher
