= Apocalypse: Save Us World Tour =

2022 concert tour by Dreamcatcher

2022 Dreamcatcher World Tour [Apocalypse: Save Us]
- World tour by Dreamcatcher
- Promotional poster for the tour's North America leg
- Associated album: Apocalypse: Save Us
- Start date: June 28, 2022
- End date: July 20, 2022
- Legs: 2
- No. of shows: 9 in North America; 1 in Latin America; 10 in total

Dreamcatcher concert chronology
- Dreamcatcher Concert: Invitation from Nightmare City (2019); Dreamcatcher World Tour [Apocalypse: Save Us] (2022); Dreamcatcher World Tour [Apocalypse: Follow Us] (2022)

2022 Dreamcatcher World Tour Apocalypse: Save Us, also known as 2022 Dreamcatcher World Tour [Apocalypse: Save Us] was a worldwide concert tour by the South Korean girl group Dreamcatcher. The tour began on June 28, 2022, in North America.

== Background ==
On April 27, 2022, Dreamcatcher announced the 2022 Dreamcatcher World Tour [Apocalypse: Save Us], scheduled to take place from June 28 to July 20. Prior to the tour, the group performed at the Primavera Sound festival in Barcelona, Spain.

Ticket sales for Dreamcatcher's new concert began on June 15 at 8:00 a.m. PST through Ticketmaster. The North American leg of the tour was originally set to conclude in Los Angeles, but the group later added a new show in Mexico City at the Auditorio BB on July 20.

The concert in Los Angeles on July 17 was also livestreamed to paying customers.

== Set list ==
Set list in New York City
1. "Intro: Save Us"
2. "Can't Get You Out of My Mind"
3. "Black or White"
4. "Red Sun"
5. "BEcause"
6. "Always"
7. "Jazz Bar"
8. "Locked Inside A Door"
9. "Wake Up"
10. "Tension"
11. "Break the Wall"
12. "Maison"
13. "Odd Eye"
14. "In the Frozen"
15. "Silent Night"
16. "Scream"
17. "Deja Vu"
18. "Boca"
19. "4 Memory"
20. "Together"
21. "Starlight"
22. "New Days"
23. "Skit: The Seven Doors"
Set list in Reading, Louisville and Chicago
1. "Intro: Save Us"
2. "BEcause"
3. "Red Sun"
4. "Locked Inside A Door"
5. "Jazz Bar"
6. "Always"
7. "Can't Get You Out of My Mind"
8. "Black or White"
9. "Starlight"
10. "Tension"
11. "Break the Wall"
12. "Maison"
13. "Odd Eye"
14. "In the Frozen"
15. "Silent Night"
16. "Scream"
17. "Deja Vu"
18. "Boca"
19. "4 Memory"
20. "Wake Up"
21. "Mayday"
22. "New Days"
23. "Skit: The Seven Doors"
Set list in Minneapolis
1. "Intro: Save Us"
2. "BEcause"
3. "PIRI"
4. "Locked Inside A Door"
5. "Jazz Bar"
6. "Always"
7. "Can't Get You Out of My Mind"
8. "Black or White"
9. "Tension"
10. "Starlight"
11. "Break the Wall"
12. "Maison"
13. "Odd Eye"
14. "Sahara"
15. "Silent Night"
16. "Scream"
17. "Deja Vu"
18. "Boca"
19. "Together"
20. "Wake Up"
21. "Mayday"
22. "New Days"
23. "Skit: The Seven Doors"
Set list in Denver
1. "Intro: Save Us"
2. "BEcause"
3. "PIRI"
4. "Locked Inside A Door"
5. "Jazz Bar"
6. "Always"
7. "Can't Get You Out of My Mind"
8. "Black or White"
9. "Tension"
10. "Starlight"
11. "Break the Wall"
12. "Maison"
13. "Odd Eye"
14. "Sahara"
15. "Silent Night"
16. "Scream"
17. "Deja Vu"
18. "Boca"
19. "Airplane"
20. "Wake Up"
21. "Mayday"
22. "New Days"
23. "Skit: The Seven Doors"
Set list in San Francisco and Los Angeles Day 1
1. "Intro: Save Us"
2. "Maison"
3. "PIRI"
4. "Locked Inside A Door"
5. "Jazz Bar"
6. "Alldaylong"
7. "Can't Get You Out of My Mind"
8. "Black or White"
9. "Tension"
10. "Starlight"
11. "Break the Wall"
12. "BEcause"
13. "Odd Eye"
14. "In the Frozen"
15. "Silent Night"
16. "Scream"
17. "Deja Vu"
18. "Boca"
19. "Airplane"
20. "Wake Up"
21. "Mayday"
22. "New Days"
23. "Skit: The Seven Doors"
Set list in Los Angeles Day 2 and Mexico
1. "Intro: Save Us"
2. "Maison"
3. "PIRI"
4. "Locked Inside A Door"
5. "Jazz Bar"
6. "Always"
7. "Can't Get You Out of My Mind"
8. "Black or White"
9. "Tension"
10. "Starlight"
11. "Break the Wall"
12. "BEcause"
13. "Odd Eye"
14. "In the Frozen"
15. "Silent Night"
16. "Scream"
17. "Deja Vu"
18. "Boca"
19. "Airplane"
20. "Sahara"
21. "Wake Up"
22. "Mayday"
23. "New Days"
24. "Skit: The Seven Doors"

== Tour dates ==
Date	City	Country	Venue	Attendance
North America
June 28, 2022	New York City	United States	Palladium Times Square	—N/a
July 1, 2022	Reading	United States	Santander Arena	—N/a
July 3, 2022	Louisville	United States	Old Forester's Paristown Hall	—N/a
July 7, 2022	Chicago	United States	Radius Chicago	—N/a
July 9, 2022	Minneapolis	United States	Skyway Theatre	—N/a
July 12, 2022	Denver	United States	Fillmore Auditorium	—N/a
July 14, 2022	San Francisco	United States	The Midway	—N/a
July 16, 2022	Los Angeles	United States	The Wiltern	—N/a
July 17, 2022	Los Angeles	United States	The Wiltern	—N/a
Latin America
July 20, 2022	Mexico City	Mexico	Auditorio BB (BlackBerry)	—N/a
