= Dystopia: The Tree of Language =

2020 studio album by Dreamcatcher

Studio album by Dreamcatcher
- Released: February 18, 2020
- Recorded: 2017–2019
- Genre: EDM; rock
- Length: 42:23
- Language: Korean; English
- Label: Dreamcatcher Company; Kakao M
- Producer: 0to1; Chairmann; Hi5; LEEZ; Ollounder

Dreamcatcher chronology
Raid of Dream (2019)	Dystopia: The Tree of Language (2020)	Dystopia: Lose Myself (2020)

Singles from Dystopia: The Tree of Language
- 1. "Full Moon" Released: January 12, 2018; 2. "Over the Sky" Released: January 16, 2019; 3. "Paradise" Released: January 29, 2020; 4. "Scream" Released: February 18, 2020

Dystopia: The Tree of Language is the debut Korean studio album by South Korean girl group Dreamcatcher. It was released on February 18, 2020, by Dreamcatcher Company, and distributed by Kakao M. Dystopia: The Tree of Language features fourteen tracks including the lead single "Scream", and is available in four versions: "E", "V", "I" and "L". Dystopia: The Tree of Language is the start of Dreamcatcher's Dystopia series and was followed by the group's fifth EP Dystopia: Lose Myself, and sixth EP Dystopia: Road to Utopia. Commercially, the album sold over 59,899 copies.

== Background and promotion ==
On January 23, 2020, it was reported that Siyeon would release the pre-release single “Paradise” on January 29. Dreamcatcher was also preparing for a group comeback, and this single would tell a new story that would lead directly into the group's new release.

On February 3, the group released the teaser schedule for their first studio album Dystopia: The Tree of Language. From February 4 to 12, the group revealed individual and group teaser images. On February 12, the group revealed a “lyrics spoiler” video, containing a snippet of the instrumentals of "Scream", and the "album story" spoiler. On February 13, the group shared a highlight medley for the album.

On February 14 and February 17, a dance preview and music video teaser for "Scream" was released respectively.

== Critical reception ==
Professional ratings
Review scores
Source	Rating
Allkpop	9/10

Writing for Allkpop, Eric Wirsing remarked: "Despite all these tracks, there is very little filler. Every song is pretty much classic Dreamcatcher in one way or another. While there are some deviations from the formula, they still killed it."

== Composition ==
=== Music and lyrics ===
The standard edition of Dystopia: The Tree of Language is about forty-two minutes long. Dystopia: The Tree of Language was written and produced by 0to1, Chairmann, Dami, Hi5, JiU, Kim Bo Eun, LEEZ, Ollounder, Siyeon and Yoohyeon among others. At fourteen tracks, the album is the longest Korean material in Dreamcatcher's catalogue. Musically, Dystopia: The Tree of Language is a rock record with influences of EDM. Members Dami, JiU and Siyeon participated in the writing of "Black or White". Members Dami, JiU, Siyeon and Yoohyeon participated in the writing of "Jazz Bar". Siyeon participated in the composing and writing of "Paradise".

=== Songs ===
Filled with strong and electrifying beats, “Scream” contains a story with a motif of witch hunts in the Middle Ages. “Red Sun” is a warning and lesson told through hypnosis to people who do not admit to their faults.

Soompi described "Paradise" as an electronic pop track that "gives a comforting message to the lonely people of modern society". "Scream" combines rock with electronica and is "motivated by the practice of witch hunts during the medieval period, and the scream before the chorus accentuates this motif".

== Track listing ==
The following tracklist was adapted from the official released highlight medley.

Dystopia: The Tree of Language track listing
No.	Title	Lyrics	Music	Arrangement	Length
1.	"Intro"		LEEZ; Ollounder	LEEZ; Ollounder	1:19
2.	"Scream"	Kim Bo Eun; LEEZ; Ollounder	LEEZ; Ollounder	LEEZ; Ollounder	3:24
3.	"Tension"	LEEZ; Ollounder	Chairmann; LEEZ; Ollounder	Chairmann; LEEZ; Ollounder	3:11
4.	"Red Sun"	Chairmann; LEEZ; Ollounder	Chairmann; LEEZ; Ollounder	Chairmann; LEEZ; Ollounder	3:05
5.	"Black or White"	Chairmann; Dami; JiU; LEEZ; Ollounder; Siyeon	0to1; Chairmann; LEEZ; Ollounder	0to1; Chairmann; LEEZ; Ollounder	3:24
6.	"Jazz Bar"	Dami; JiU; LEEZ; Ollounder; Siyeon; Yoohyeon	LEEZ; Ollounder	LEEZ; Ollounder	3:34
7.	"Sahara"	LEEZ; Ollounder	LEEZ; Ollounder	LEEZ; Ollounder	3:11
8.	"In the Frozen"	LEEZ; Ollounder	Hi5; LEEZ; Ollounder	Hi5; LEEZ; Ollounder	3:16
9.	"Daybreak"	LEEZ; Ollounder	LEEZ; Ollounder	LEEZ; Ollounder	3:03
10.	"Full Moon"	LEEZ; Ollounder	LEEZ; Ollounder	LEEZ; Ollounder	3:09
11.	"Over the Sky"	LEEZ; Ollounder	LEEZ; Ollounder	LEEZ; Ollounder	3:17
12.	"Outro"	LEEZ; Ollounder	LEEZ; Ollounder	LEEZ; Ollounder	1:03
13.	"Scream (Inst.)"		LEEZ; Ollounder	LEEZ; Ollounder	3:24
14.	"Paradise" (performed by Siyeon)	LEEZ; Ollounder; Siyeon	LEEZ; Ollounder; Siyeon	LEEZ; Ollounder	4:03
Total length:					42:23

== Accolades ==
Year-end lists
Critic/Publication	List	Work	Rank	Ref.
Dazed	The 40 Best K-pop Songs of 2020	"Scream"	6	
South China Morning Post	The Top 15 K-pop Albums of 2020	Dystopia: The Tree of Language	N/A	
Time	The Songs and Albums That Defined K-Pop's Monumental Year in 2020	Dystopia: The Tree of Language	N/A	
Paper	The 40 Best K-pop Songs of 2020	"Scream"	32	

== Charts ==
Chart (2020)	Peak position
South Korea (Gaon Album Chart)	3
South Korea (Gaon Retail Album Chart)	9
