= Dystopia: Lose Myself =

2021 EP by Dreamcatcher

- Digital cover

EP by Dreamcatcher
- Released: August 17, 2020
- Recorded: 2020
- Genre: K-pop
- Length: 19:17
- Language: Korean; English
- Label: Dreamcatcher Company; Genie Music
- Producer: LEEZ; Ollounder

Dreamcatcher chronology
Dystopia: The Tree of Language (2020)	Dystopia: Lose Myself (2020)	Dystopia: Road to Utopia (2021)

Singles from Dystopia: Lose Myself
- 1. "Boca" Released: August 17, 2020

Dystopia: Lose Myself is the fifth Korean extended play by South Korean girl group Dreamcatcher. It was released on August 17, 2020 by Dreamcatcher Company. Dystopia: Lose Myself features six tracks including the lead single "Boca", and is available in four versions: "S", "H", "E" and "D". Dystopia: Lose Myself is the second installment of the Dystopia series, following the group's first album Dystopia: The Tree of Language released earlier in 2020.

== Background and promotion ==
In July 2020, Dreamcatcher released an image of an unknown code number on Instagram, hinting at a comeback in August.

The first official teasers for the album were first released on July 29, starting with a comeback schedule, followed by individual and group concept photos, a track list, a highlight medley, a dance preview, and two music video teasers. The album and music video for the title track "Boca" were released on August 17, 2020.

== Commercial performance ==
Commercially, Dystopia: Lose Myself sold more than 86,000 copies in its first month of release, more than doubling the sales of Dreamcatcher's previous album, Dystopia: The Tree of Language, becoming the group's best selling album at the time. The EP debuted at number three on the Gaon Album charts. The music video has amassed 71 million views on YouTube as of June 2023, and remains the group's most viewed music video on the video platform. The title track "Boca" is also the group's most-streamed song on Spotify, with over 50 million streams as of June 2023.

== Composition ==
=== Songs ===
The title track "Boca" is described as a fusion of Dreamcatcher's signature rock sound and hip hop elements with an underlying Moombahton rhythm. The name of the track "boca" is the Spanish word for "mouth", and the lyrics contain social commentary criticizing the prevalence of Cyberbullying and hateful comments on social media.

== Track listing ==
Dystopia: Lose Myself track listing
No.	Title	Lyrics	Music	Arrangement	Length
1.	"Intro"		Ollounder; Leez	Ollounder; Leez	1:39
2.	"Boca"	Ollounder; Leez	Ollounder; Leez	Ollounder; Leez	3:09
3.	"Break The Wall"	LEEZ; Ollounder; Dami	LEEZ; Ollounder	LEEZ; Ollounder	3:46
4.	"Can't Get You Out of my Mind"	LEEZ; Ollounder; Maddox	LEEZ; Ollounder	LEEZ; Ollounder	3:43
5.	"Dear"	JiU	JiU; Ollounder; Leez	Ollounder; Leez; JiU	3:48
6.	"Boca - Instrumental"		Ollounder; Leez	Ollounder; Leez	3:09
Total length:					19:17

== Charts ==
=== Monthly charts ===
Chart performance for Dystopia: Lose Myself
Chart (2020)	Peak position
South Korean Albums (Gaon)	7

=== Year-end charts ===
Year-end chart performance for Dystopia: Lose Myself
Chart (2020)	Position
South Korean Albums (Gaon)	82

== Release history ==
Release dates and formats for Dystopia: Road to Utopia
Region	Date	Format	Label
Various	August 17, 2020	CD; Download; streaming	Dreamcatcher Company; Genie Music
