= UAU (group) =

South Korean musical trio

- UAU in 2026

Background information
- Origin: Seoul, South Korea
- Genre: K-pop
- Years active: 2025–present
- Label: Dreamcatcher Company
- Spinoff of: Dreamcatcher
- Members: JiU; SuA; Yoohyeon

UAU (Korean: 유아유) is the first sub-unit of South Korean girl group Dreamcatcher. Formed by Dreamcatcher Company in 2025, the trio consists of JiU, SuA and Yoohyeon. They officially debuted on May 28, 2025, with the extended play (EP) Playlist #You Are You.

== Career ==
=== 2025: Formation and debut ===
On March 10, 2025, Dreamcatcher Company announced that, after eight years together, three members of Dreamcatcher had chosen to not renew their contracts with the label. Four members elected to renew their contracts, with JiU, SuA and Yoohyeon choosing to remain and form a new group. The name UAU was revealed on April 17, with a syllable taken from each member's name. Their debut EP, Playlist #You Are You, was announced on May 8 and released at the end of the month, on May 28. Following the EP's release, the trio performed at Weverse Con on May 31.

=== 2026: Playlist #Your Youth ===
On June 11, UAU announced their second extended play, Playlist #Your Youth, which was released on July 1.

== Discography ==
=== Extended plays ===
List of extended plays, showing selected details, selected chart positions and sales figures
Title	Details	Peak chart positions	Sales
Title	Details	KOR	Sales
Playlist #You Are You	Released: May 28, 2025; Label: Dreamcatcher Company; Formats: CD, digital download, streaming	10	KOR: 94,123
Playlist #Your Youth	Released: July 1, 2026; Label: Dreamcatcher Company; Formats: CD, digital download, streaming	12	KOR: 39,474

=== Singles ===
List of singles, showing year released, selected chart positions, and name of the album
Title	Year	Peak chart position	Album
Title	Year	KOR	Album
"2 Months"	2025	— (Note: "2 Months" did not enter the Circle Digital Chart, but peaked at number 93 on the Circle Download Chart.)	Playlist #You Are You
"Attitude"	2025	— (Note: "Attitude" did not enter the Circle Digital Chart, but peaked at number 127 on the Circle Download Chart.)	Playlist #You Are You
"Gene"	2026	188	Playlist #Your Youth

=== Other charted songs ===
List of other charted songs, showing year released, selected chart positions, and name of the album
Title	Year	Peak chart position	Album
Title	Year	KOR DL	Album
"Good Luck"	2025	152	Playlist #You Are You
"Sacrifice"	2025	160	Playlist #You Are You

=== Music videos ===
Title	Year	Director
"2 Months"	2025	Noko (AmbienceSeoul)
"Gene"	2026	김성진 (whomadethiiiis)
