= Dystopia: Road to Utopia =

2021 EP by Dreamcatcher

- Digital cover

EP by Dreamcatcher
- Released: January 26, 2021
- Recorded: 2020
- Genres: Hip hop; nu metal; rock
- Length: 21:35
- Languages: Korean; English
- Labels: Dreamcatcher Company; Genie Music
- Producers: LEEZ; Ollounder; ZENUR; 엄태원

Dreamcatcher chronology
Dystopia: Lose Myself (2020)	Dystopia: Road to Utopia (2021)	Summer Holiday (2021)

Singles from Dystopia: Road to Utopia
- 1. "Odd Eye" Released: January 26, 2021

Dystopia: Road to Utopia is the sixth Korean extended play by South Korean girl group Dreamcatcher. It was released on January 26, 2021 by Dreamcatcher Company. Dystopia: Road to Utopia features six tracks including the lead single "Odd Eye", and is available in four versions: "D", "A", "R" and "K". Dystopia: Road to Utopia is the third installment of the Dystopia series, following the group's first album Dystopia: The Tree of Language and fifth EP Dystopia: Lose Myself, both released in 2020.

== Background and promotion ==
On January 4, 2021, it was reported that Dreamcatcher had been working on an album that connects the story contained in "Boca", the lead single of their fifth EP Dystopia: Lose Myself.

== Commercial performance ==
On January 30, Dreamcatcher Company revealed that Dystopia: Road to Utopia has sold more than 60,000 copies in just three days (according to the statistics of Hanteo Chart), and the sales on the day of release has surpassed the first week sales of the previous EP, Dystopia: Lose Myself. The EP debuted at number one on the GAON charts, making it the first album of the group to reach the number one position. In its first month, the EP surpassed 90,000 copies sold.

== Composition ==
=== Songs ===
The lead single "Odd Eye" is a nu metal with a strong rock sound and hip hop elements. It conveys the story of the EP implicitly, with a deep and strong will to move forward once again towards a true utopia.

== Track listing ==
The following tracklist was adapted from the official released track list image.

Dystopia: Road to Utopia track listing
No.	Title	Lyrics	Music	Arrangement	Length
1.	"Intro"		LEEZ; Ollounder	LEEZ; Ollounder	1:31
2.	"Odd Eye"	1월8일; LEEZ; Ollounder	LEEZ; Ollounder	LEEZ; Ollounder	3:04
3.	"Wind Blows (바람아)"	LEEZ; Ollounder	LEEZ; Ollounder	LEEZ; Ollounder	3:17
4.	"Poison Love"	LEEZ; Ollounder	LEEZ; Ollounder; 엄태원	LEEZ; Ollounder; 엄태원	3:57
5.	"4 Memory"	JiU; LEEZ; Ollounder	JiU; LEEZ; Ollounder	LEEZ; Ollounder	3:08
6.	"New Days (시간의 틈)"	Dami; LEEZ; Ollounder	Dami; HAKU; GIANNIS; LEEZ; Ollounder; ZENUR	LEEZ; Ollounder; ZENUR	3:31
7.	"Odd Eye" (instrumental)		LEEZ; Ollounder	LEEZ; Ollounder	3:04
Total length:					21:35

== Charts ==
=== Weekly charts ===
Chart performance for Dystopia: Road to Utopia
Chart (2021)	Peak position
South Korean Albums (Gaon)	1

=== Year-end charts ===
Year-end chart performance for Dystopia: Road to Utopia
Chart (2021)	Position
South Korean Albums (Gaon)	80

== Release history ==
Release dates and formats for Dystopia: Road to Utopia
Region	Date	Format	Label
Various	January 26, 2021	CD; Download; streaming	Dreamcatcher Company; Genie Music
