= Apocalypse: From Us =

EP by Dreamcatcher
- Released: May 24, 2023
- Recorded: 2023
- Length: 14:20
- Languages: Korean; English
- Labels: Dreamcatcher Company; Kakao Entertainment
- Producer: Ollounder

Dreamcatcher chronology
Apocalypse: Follow Us (2022)	Apocalypse: From Us (2023)	Villains (2023)

Singles from Apocalypse: From Us
- 1. "Bon Voyage" Released: May 24, 2023

Apocalypse: From Us is the eighth Korean extended play by South Korean girl group Dreamcatcher. It was released on May 24, 2023, by Dreamcatcher Company, and distributed by Kakao Entertainment. Apocalypse: From Us features five tracks including the lead single "Bonvoyage", and is available in "W", (Note: "W" version was released as a limited edition of the series) "A", "Y" versions and a platform version.

== Background and release ==
In May 2023, Dreamcatcher released an image of an unknown code word, hinting at a comeback in May.

The album and music video for the title track "Bonvoyage" were released on May 24, 2023.

The music video has amassed 31 million views on YouTube while the EP has over 23 million streams on Spotify as of December 2024.

== Track listing ==
Apocalypse: From Us track listing
No.	Title	Lyrics	Music	Arrangement	Length
1.	"Intro: From Us"		Ollounder; Buddy; Peperoni; Oliv; Door	Ollounder; Buddy; Peperoni; Oliv; Door	1:08
2.	"Bonvoyage"	Ollounder; Door; Maddox	Ollounder; Peperoni; Oliv; Buddy; Door	Ollounder; Peperoni; Oliv; Buddy	3:33
3.	"Demian"	Ollounder; Door; Maddox	Ollounder; Buddy; Peperoni; Oliv; Door	Ollounder; Buddy; Peperoni; Oliv	2:59
4.	"Propose"	Ollounder; Door; Maddox	Ollounder; Peperoni; Oliv; Buddy; Door	Ollounder; Peperoni; Oliv; Buddy	3:12
5.	"To. You"	Ollounder; Door	Ollounder; Buddy; Peperoni; Oliv; Door	Ollounder; Buddy; Peperoni; Oliv	3:25
Total length:					14:20

== Release history ==
Release history for Apocalypse: Follow Us
Region	Date	Format	Label
South Korea	May 24, 2023	CD	Dreamcatcher Company; Kakao Entertainment
Various	May 24, 2023	Digital download; streaming	Dreamcatcher Company; Kakao Entertainment
