= Summer Holiday (EP) =

- Digital cover

EP by Dreamcatcher
- Released: July 30, 2021
- Recorded: 2021
- Length: 18:51
- Language: Korean; English
- Label: Dreamcatcher Company; Genie Music
- Producer: LEEZ; Ollounder; 한수석; Monho

Dreamcatcher chronology
| Dystopia: Road to Utopia (2021) | Summer Holiday (2021) | Apocalypse: Save Us (2022) |

Singles from Summer Holiday
- 1. "Because" Released: July 30, 2021

Summer Holiday is the second special Korean extended play by South Korean girl group Dreamcatcher. It was released on July 30, 2021, by Dreamcatcher Company. Summer Holiday features six tracks including the lead single "Because", and is available in four versions: "G", "I", "F" and "T".

== Background and promotion ==
On July 30, Dreamcatcher made their comeback with the special EP Summer Holiday and its lead single "Because".

== Track listing ==
Summer Holiday track listing
| No. | Title | Lyrics | Music | Arrangement | Length |
|---|---|---|---|---|---|
| 1. | "Intro" | | LEEZ; Ollounder | LEEZ; Ollounder | 1:16 |
| 2. | "Because" | LEEZ; Ollounder | LEEZ; Ollounder | LEEZ; Ollounder | 3:11 |
| 3. | "Airplane" | LEEZ; Ollounder | LEEZ; Ollounder | LEEZ; Ollounder | 3:00 |
| 4. | "Whistle" | LEEZ; Ollounder | LEEZ; Ollounder | LEEZ; Ollounder | 3:29 |
| 5. | "Alldaylong" | JiU; Ollounder | JiU; Ollounder | Ollounder | 3:37 |
| 6. | "A Heart of Sunflower" (해바라기의 마음) | LEEZ | 한수석; LEEZ; Monho | LEEZ; 한수석 | 4:17 |
| Total length: | | | | | 18:51 |

== Charts ==
=== Weekly charts ===
Weekly chart performance for Summer Holiday
| Chart (2021) | Peak position |
|---|---|
| South Korean Albums (Gaon) | 2 |
| Finland (Suomen virallinen lista) | 9 |

=== Year-end charts ===
Year-end chart performance for Summer Holiday
| Chart (2021) | Position |
|---|---|
| South Korean Albums (Gaon) | 81 |

== Release history ==
Release dates and formats for Summer Holiday
| Region | Date | Format | Label |
|---|---|---|---|
| Various | July 30, 2021 | CD; digital download; streaming | Dreamcatcher Company; Genie Music |
