= Nightmare (single album) =

Single album by Dreamcatcher
- Released: January 13, 2017
- Recorded: 2016–2017
- Genre: K-pop; rock; ballad
- Length: 10:46
- Language: Korean
- Label: Happy Face Entertainment; Interpark
- Producer: Super Bomb

Dreamcatcher chronology
| Nightmare (2017) | Fall Asleep in the Mirror (2017) |

Singles from Nightmare
- 1. "Chase Me" Released: January 13, 2017

Nightmare (Korean: 악몽; Hanja: 惡夢; RR: angmong) is the debut single album recorded by South Korean girl group Dreamcatcher. It is the first release from the group following the rename of the band and addition of new members, Handong and Gahyeon. The EP was released on January 13, 2017 and debuted at number 20 on the Gaon Album Chart.

== Background ==
In mid-2016, Happy Face Entertainment announced that the group would re-brand as Dreamcatcher with two additional members; Gahyeon and Handong, In the following months, Happy Face Entertainment released an official teaser image and announced that the group will debut in the first half of 2017.

On January 13, 2017, Happy Face Entertainment released Dreamcatcher's first EP "Nightmare", with their title track "Chase Me". On January 19, they made an official debut stage at M Countdown.

== Music video ==
The music video was released on January 13, 2017.

== Release and promotion ==
The album released on January 13, 2017. They also had a special showcase for their debut. Their debut stage was featured in Mnet's M Countdown program.

== Track listing ==
| No. | Title | Writer(s) | Arrangement | Length |
|---|---|---|---|---|
| 1. | "Welcome to Dream (Intro)" | Super Bomb | Super Bomb | 0:40 |
| 2. | "Chase Me" | Kim Bo-eun, Super Bomb | Super Bomb | 3:09 |
| 3. | "Emotion" (소원 하나) | Super Bomb | Super Bomb | 3:43 |
| 4. | "Chase Me" (Instrumental) | Super Bomb | Super Bomb | 3:09 |

== Charts ==
| Chart (2017) | Peak position |
|---|---|
| South Korean Albums (Gaon) | 20 |

== Release history ==
| Region | Date | Format | Label |
|---|---|---|---|
| South Korea | January 13, 2017 | CD; digital download | Happy Face Entertainment; Interpark |
