= Virtuous (EP) =

- Digital cover

EP by Dreamcatcher
- Released: July 10, 2024
- Recorded: 2024
- Length: 16:55
- Languages: Korean; English
- Label: Dreamcatcher Company
- Producers: Ollounder; Tankzzo

Dreamcatcher chronology
Villains (2023)	Virtuous (2024)

Singles from Virtuous
- 1. "Justice" Released: July 10, 2024

Virtuous is the tenth Korean extended play by South Korean girl group Dreamcatcher. It was released on July 10, 2024, by Dreamcatcher Company, and distributed by Kakao Entertainment. Virtuous features five tracks including the lead single "Justice", and is available in twelve different physical versions (one limited, four regular and seven "POCA" versions).

Virtuous is the second and last installment of the "Versus" duology.

== Background and release ==
On June 17, 2024, it was reported that Dreamcatcher would be making a July comeback.

On June 21, the official Dreamcatcher X (formerly Twitter) account posted a mystery code image containing times and co-ordinates to several locations throughout Seoul. Fans gathered at the corresponding times to receive an AirDrop at each location, each of which contained a unique mystery code image. Upon collating the images, the mystery code could be solved, revealing the comeback date and album title.

The first official teasers for the album were released on June 24, starting with a comeback schedule, followed by individual and group concept photos, a track list, a highlight medley, a lyric spoiler video, a dance preview, and a music video teaser.

On July 5, it was announced on the official Dreamcatcher online message board that the main vocalist Siyeon would not be participating in the album promotions due to anxiety and poor health and would be going on hiatus.

The album and music video for the title track "Justice" were released on July 10, 2024.

== Composition ==
=== Songs ===
The title track "Justice" is a return to the group's signature rock sound and is described as an alternative rock track with a "180-degree change in concept" when compared to the septet's previous release "OOTD". The main concept of the track and music video is a hero fighting against evil, which is in contrast with the themes of temptation and narcissism prevalent in "OOTD".

== Commercial performance ==
Commercially, Virtuous sold more than 100,000 copies in its first month of release, including the "POCA" versions. The EP debuted at number 6 on the Circle Weekly Album charts. The music video has amassed 27 million views on YouTube while the EP has over 11 million streams on Spotify as of December 2024.

== Track listing ==
Virtuous track listing
No.	Title	Lyrics	Music	Arrangement	Length
1.	"Intro : 7'Dreamcatcher"		Ollounder; Tankzzo; Hayoung Chu; Hayoung Song; LAKOV	Ollounder; Tankzzo; Hayoung Chu; Hayoung Song; LAKOV	3:55
2.	"Justice"	Ollounder; Door	Ollounder; Tankzzo	Ollounder; Tankzzo	2:59
3.	"Stomp!"	Ollounder; Door; Balm	Ollounder; Door; Tankzzo	Ollounder; Tankzzo	3:03
4.	"2 Rings"	Ollounder; Door	Ollounder; Door; Kikoi; Tankzzo	Ollounder; Kikoi; Tankzzo	2:47
5.	"Fireflies"	Ollounder; Door	Ollounder; Door; Tankzzo; LAKOV	Ollounder; Tankzzo; LAKOV	4:11
Total length:					16:55

== Charts ==
=== Weekly charts ===
Weekly chart performance for Virtuous
Chart (2024)	Peak position
South Korean Albums (Circle)	6

=== Monthly charts ===
Monthly chart performance for VirtuouS
Chart (2024)	Position
South Korean Albums (Circle)	19

== Release history ==
Release history for Virtuous
Region	Date	Format	Label
South Korea	July 10, 2024	CD	Dreamcatcher Company; Kakao Entertainment
Various	July 10, 2024	Digital download; streaming	Dreamcatcher Company; Kakao Entertainment
