= Villains (EP) =

- Digital cover

EP by Dreamcatcher
- Released: November 22, 2023
- Recorded: 2023
- Genre: K-pop; rock; EDM; pop-punk
- Length: 13:49
- Language: Korean; English
- Label: Dreamcatcher Company
- Producer: Ollounder; Door; Maddox; Oliv; Peperoni

Dreamcatcher chronology
| Apocalypse: From Us (2023) | Villains (2023) | Virtuous (2024) |

Singles from Villains
- 1. "OOTD" Released: November 22, 2023

Villains (also referred to as Versus Villains) is the ninth Korean extended play by South Korean girl group Dreamcatcher. It was released on November 22, 2023, by Dreamcatcher Company, and distributed by Kakao Entertainment. Villains features five tracks including the lead single "OOTD", and was available in twelve different physical versions (1 limited, 4 regular and 7 "POCA" versions).

Villains is the first installment of the "Versus" duology, followed by Dreamcatcher's tenth EP Virtuous, which was released in July 2024.

== Background and release ==
On October 21, 2023, the official Dreamcatcher X (formerly Twitter) account reposted a nine-second long screen-recording from the user "ymenehcra99" of two messages being received from a mysterious source identified only by a crown emoji. Almost a hundred more cryptic posts and images continued to be uploaded via this user's account over the following month leading up to the release of the EP, making it the first time the group had promoted an upcoming release through the use of an alternate reality game.

The first official teasers for the album were released on October 31, starting with a comeback schedule, followed by individual and group concept photos, a track list, a highlight medley, a lyric spoiler video, a dance preview, and a music video teaser. The album and music video for the title track "OOTD" were released on November 22, 2023.

== Composition ==
=== Songs ===
The title track "OOTD" deviates slightly from the group's signature rock sound and is described as a pop-punk track. The name of the track "OOTD" is derived from the popular fashion-blogging term "outfit of the day", and the lyrics center on the concept of being "destructive and extraordinary" by being confident to the point of narcissism.

== Commercial performance ==
Commercially, VillainS sold more than 117,000 copies in its first month of release, including the "POCA" versions. The EP debuted at number three on the Circle Weekly Album charts. The music video has amassed 26 million views on YouTube while the EP has over 13 million streams on Spotify as of December 2024.

== Track listing ==
Villains track listing
| No. | Title | Lyrics | Music | Arrangement | Length |
|---|---|---|---|---|---|
| 1. | "Intro: This My Fashion" | | Door; Oliv; Ollounder; Peperoni | Door; Oliv; Ollounder; Peperoni | 1:08 |
| 2. | "OOTD" | Door; Ollounder; Maddox | Door; Oliv; Ollounder; Maddox; Peperoni | Oliv; Ollounder; Peperoni | 2:56 |
| 3. | "Rising" | Ollounder; Door | Ollounder; Peperoni; Oliv; Door | Ollounder; Peperoni; Oliv | 3:17 |
| 4. | "Shatter" | Ollounder; Door | Ollounder; Peperoni; Oliv; Door | Ollounder; Peperoni; Oliv | 2:48 |
| 5. | "We Are Young" | Ollounder; Door | Ollounder; Peperoni; Oliv; Door; Kikoi | Ollounder; Peperoni; Oliv; Kikoi | 3:37 |
| Total length: | | | | | 13:49 |

== Charts ==
=== Weekly charts ===
Weekly chart performance for Villains
| Chart (2023) | Peak position |
|---|---|
| South Korean Albums (Circle) | 3 |

=== Monthly charts ===
Monthly chart performance for Villains
| Chart (2023) | Position |
|---|---|
| South Korean Albums (Circle) | 15 |

== Release history ==
Release history for Villains
| Region | Date | Format | Label |
|---|---|---|---|
| South Korea | November 22, 2023 | CD | Dreamcatcher Company; Kakao Entertainment |
| Various | November 22, 2023 | Digital download; streaming | Dreamcatcher Company; Kakao Entertainment |
