= Apocalypse: Follow Us =

- Digital cover

EP by Dreamcatcher
- Released: October 11, 2022
- Recorded: 2022
- Genre: K-pop; industrial rock; nu metal
- Length: 15:52
- Language: Korean; English
- Label: Dreamcatcher Company; Sony Music
- Producer: Leez; Ollounder

Dreamcatcher chronology
Apocalypse: Save Us (2022)	Apocalypse: Follow Us (2022)	Apocalypse: From Us (2023)

Singles from Apocalypse: Follow Us
- 1. "Vision" Released: October 11, 2022

Apocalypse: Follow Us is the seventh Korean extended play by South Korean girl group Dreamcatcher. It was released on October 11, 2022, by Dreamcatcher Company, and distributed by Sony Music. Apocalypse: Follow Us features six tracks including the lead single "Vision", and is available in "T", (Note: "T" version was released as a limited edition of the series) "H", "E" versions and a platform (Note: Released exclusively in the United States) version.

== Background and release ==
In September 2022, Dreamcatcher released an image of an unknown code word, hinting at a comeback in October.

== Track listing ==
Apocalypse: Follow Us track listing
No.	Title	Lyrics	Music	Arrangement	Length
1.	"Intro: Chaotical X"		Leez; Ollounder	Leez; Ollounder	1:12
2.	"Vision"	Leez; Ollounder; Maddox	Leez; Ollounder; June One	Leez; Ollounder; June One	3:09
3.	"Fairytale"	Leez; Ollounder; Maddox	Leez; Ollounder	Leez; Ollounder	3:51
4.	"Some Love"	Leez; Ollounder; Maddox	Leez; Ollounder; Peperoni; Oliv	Leez; Ollounder; Peperoni; Oliv	2:52
5.	"Rainy Day" (이 비가 그칠 때면)	Leez; Ollounder	Leez; Ollounder; Maddox	Leez; Ollounder	3:37
6.	"Outro: Mother Nature"		Leez; Ollounder	Leez; Ollounder	1:11
Total length:					15:52

== Charts ==
=== Weekly charts ===
Weekly chart performance for Apocalypse: Follow Us
Chart (2022)	Peak position
Polish Albums (ZPAV)	40
South Korean Albums (Circle)	4
Swedish Physical Albums (Sverigetopplistan)	20

=== Monthly charts ===
Monthly chart performance for Apocalypse: Follow Us
Chart (2022)	Peak position
South Korean Albums (Circle)	13

== Release history ==
Release history for Apocalypse: Follow Us
Region	Date	Format	Label
South Korea	October 11, 2022	CD	Dreamcatcher Company; Sony Music
Various	October 11, 2022	Digital download; streaming	Dreamcatcher Company; Sony Music
