= Allkpop =

South Korean news blog for K-pop

- Available in: English
- Owner: 6Theory Media
- Website: www.allkpop.com
- Registration: Optional
- Launched: 1 October 2007; 19 years ago
- Current status: Active

Allkpop (stylized in all lowercase) is an American website which features Korean pop and gossip news. It was launched in October 2007 by Johnny Noh and Paul Han and is owned by 6Theory Media. In its list of useful websites, The Korea Herald called it the "fastest news breaker" for K-pop.

== Controversies ==
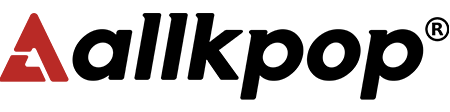
Former logo of Allkpop

In 2010, Tablo of Korean hip-hop trio Epik High alleged that allkpop had been sharing pirated links to the group's Epilogue album, including "a leaked music video of 'Run' and illegal streaming of all our songs" on his personal Twitter account. Tablo has since removed the posts.

In November 2013, allkpop published an article with leaked nude photos of the solo singer Ailee. The site said it had taken the images from an online forum. It also said that in June that year a person who claimed to represent the owner of the photos had offered them to allkpop for $3,500, and that it had turned the offer down and told Ailee's agency.

One day later, South Korean entertainment site Dispatch released an audio recording with Ailee's ex-boyfriend, Eun Duk "Daniel" Lee Lee who acted as the vice president of content for allkpop owner 6Theory Media, who was attempting to sell nude photos of the singer to the outlet. In an official statement, 6Theory Media confirmed Lee had previously dated Ailee but "did not post the photos in question." A week later, on November 18, Lee admitted it is his voice in the Dispatch call in which he attempted to sell nude photos of his ex-girlfriend but denied he leaked the pictures to his own publication. Speaking to SBS' One Night of TV Entertainment program where he did not reveal his face, Lee corroborated 6Theory Media's statement that while he did have the phone call, he did not publish the photos to his workplace's website.

Ailee's Korean representation at the time, YMC Entertainment, explained in a statement that Ailee had been scammed by an offer to model for an underwear company and shared the photos with Lee "in order to get advice on how to respond to the incident." YMC added, "Ailee shared the photos with him after he persuaded her that he needs the photos to get a better idea on the issue."

The site and its leadership was under scrutiny again in January 2025 following its official X account sharing political content including content from Alex Jones, the American far-right radio show host and conspiracy theorist. While allkpop's political posts were removed within 24 hours, political posts from Noh remained as of January 22, 2025.
