= Dreamcatcher (group) =

South Korean girl group

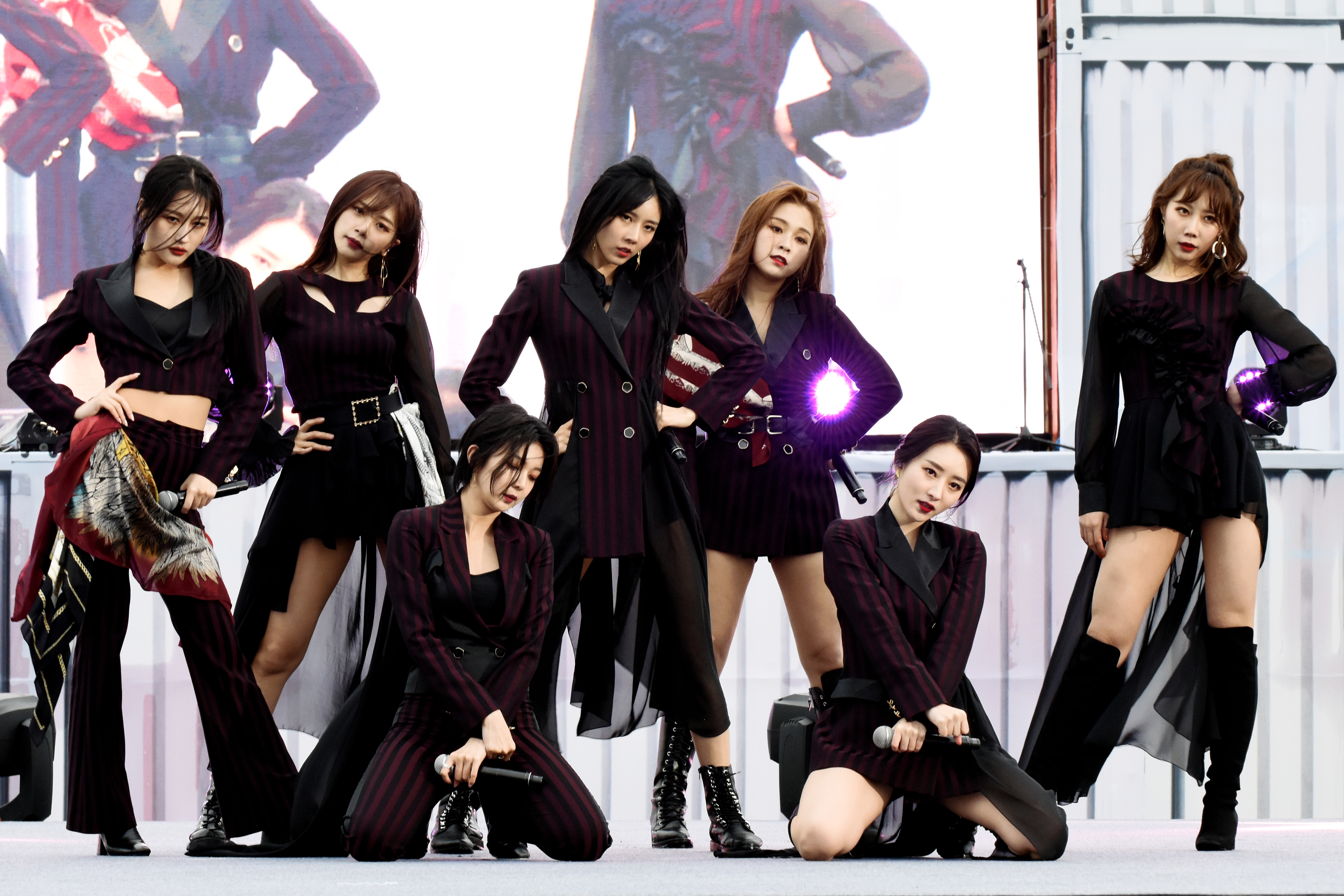
- Dreamcatcher in April 2019; L–R: Siyeon, JiU, Dami, Yoohyeon, Gahyun, SuA, and Handong

Background information
- Also known as: MINX (2014–2016)
- Origin: Seoul, South Korea
- Genres: K-pop; rock
- Works: Dreamcatcher discography
- Years active: 2014–present
- Labels: Dreamcatcher; Pony Canyon
- Spinoffs: UAU
- Members: JiU; SuA; Siyeon; Handong; Yoohyeon; Dami; Gahyun
- Website: dreamcatcher.kr

Dreamcatcher (Korean: 드림캐쳐; formerly known as MINX; also stylized as Dream Catcher) is a South Korean girl group formed by Dreamcatcher Company. The group consists of seven members: JiU, SuA, Siyeon, Handong, Yoohyeon, Dami, and Gahyun (formerly known as Gahyeon). They made their official debut on January 13, 2017, with the single album Nightmare.

Dreamcatcher originally debuted under the name MINX with a five-member line-up of JiU, SuA, Siyeon, Yoohyeon, and Dami. In November 2016, the group announced their re-debut in 2017 under the new name Dreamcatcher, with two new members Handong and Gahyun, as well as a darker concept with a non-mainstream music style, in order to stand out from other K-pop girl groups.

Dreamcatcher has come to be known as "The Face of Rock in K-pop"; their music has been praised for its distinctive sound, combining elements of both rock and metal. The group has developed a stronger international popularity as compared to their domestic popularity, and a reputation for touring overseas often.

== Career ==
=== 2014–2016: MINX ===
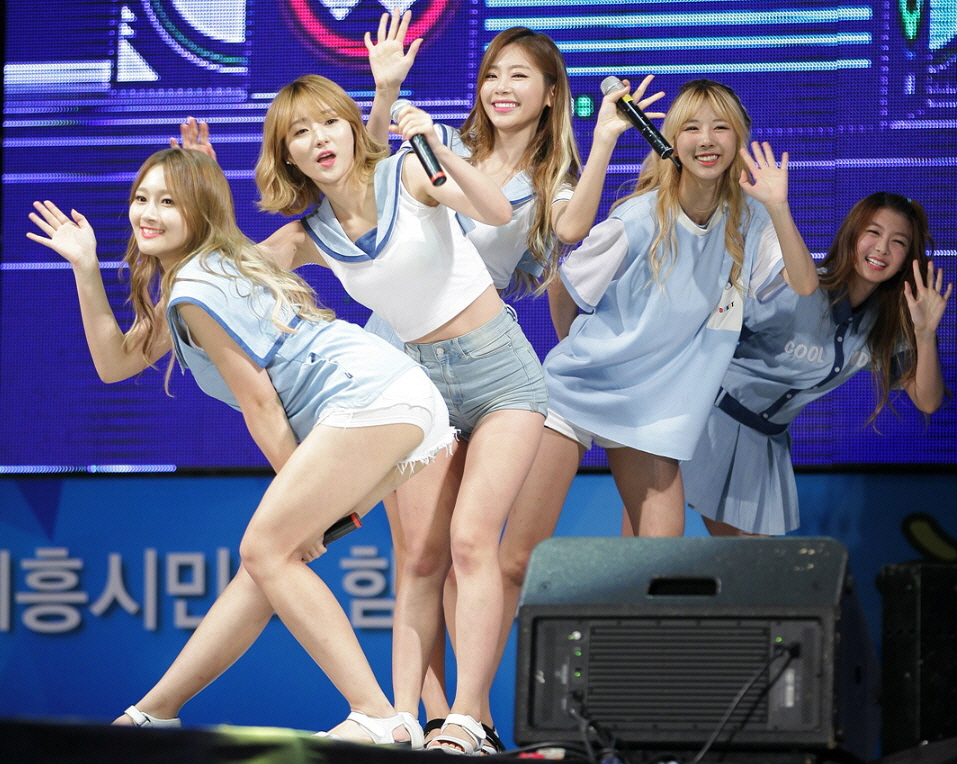
The group as MINX on stage in 2015

Under the name Minx, the group held their first live performance at the Oak Valley Summertime Festival on August 9, 2014, performing two original songs: "Action" and "Why Did You Come To My Home". On September 15, Happyface Entertainment officially announced their new girl group. Three days later, Minx released their debut digital single "Why Did You Come to My Home", making their official music show debut on M Countdown. That December, they released a holiday single, a cover of "Rockin' Around the Christmas Tree" with their labelmate, the girl group Dal Shabet.

In July 2015, Minx released their first and only EP Love Shake, with a lead single of the same name. The single was promoted as a "joyous song" that "goes well with summer", a remake of the song "Love Shake" from Dal Shabet's Bang Bang album.

In November 2016, after a year of limited activity, Happyface Entertainment revealed that Minx would re-debut under the name Dreamcatcher with two additional members, Handong and Gahyun. In a later interview, CEO Lee Joowon said that he believed Minx had failed because there were too many K-pop girl groups promoting at that time with a similar "cute" concept and music style. He explained that Dreamcatcher was intended to have a "girl group style that didn't exist in Korea, a girl group concept that didn't happen very often" and that the point of launching Dreamcatcher would be to do "what others won't do".

=== 2017: Re-debut as Dreamcatcher and start of Nightmare series ===
On January 13, 2017, the group re-debuted as Dreamcatcher with the release of their single album Nightmare. Its lead single "Chase Me" is described as a "young metal number based on a rock sound", steering away completely from Minx's former musical style. On the same day, Dreamcatcher made their music show debut at Music Bank with "Chase Me".

On April 5, Dreamcatcher released their second single album Fall Asleep in the Mirror with metal-rock lead single "Good Night". The fan showcase for the album sold out in three minutes.

Dreamcatcher released their first EP, Prequel, on July 27, with the lead single "Fly High", a "dramatic song with powerful guitar sounds that opens with a beautiful piano melody". The rest of the album's tracks also maintain their signature rock sound, also drawing inspiration from the drum and bass genre. The album debuted at number five on the Billboard World Albums Chart.

On August 5, Dreamcatcher performed at the Jeonju Ultimate Music Festival (JUMF), marking their first rock festival attendance with a live band-backed 30-minute set.

In September 2017, Dreamcatcher embarked on their first world tour, beginning with their "Fly High Concert in Japan". The group performed in Osaka on September 26 and in Tokyo on October 9.

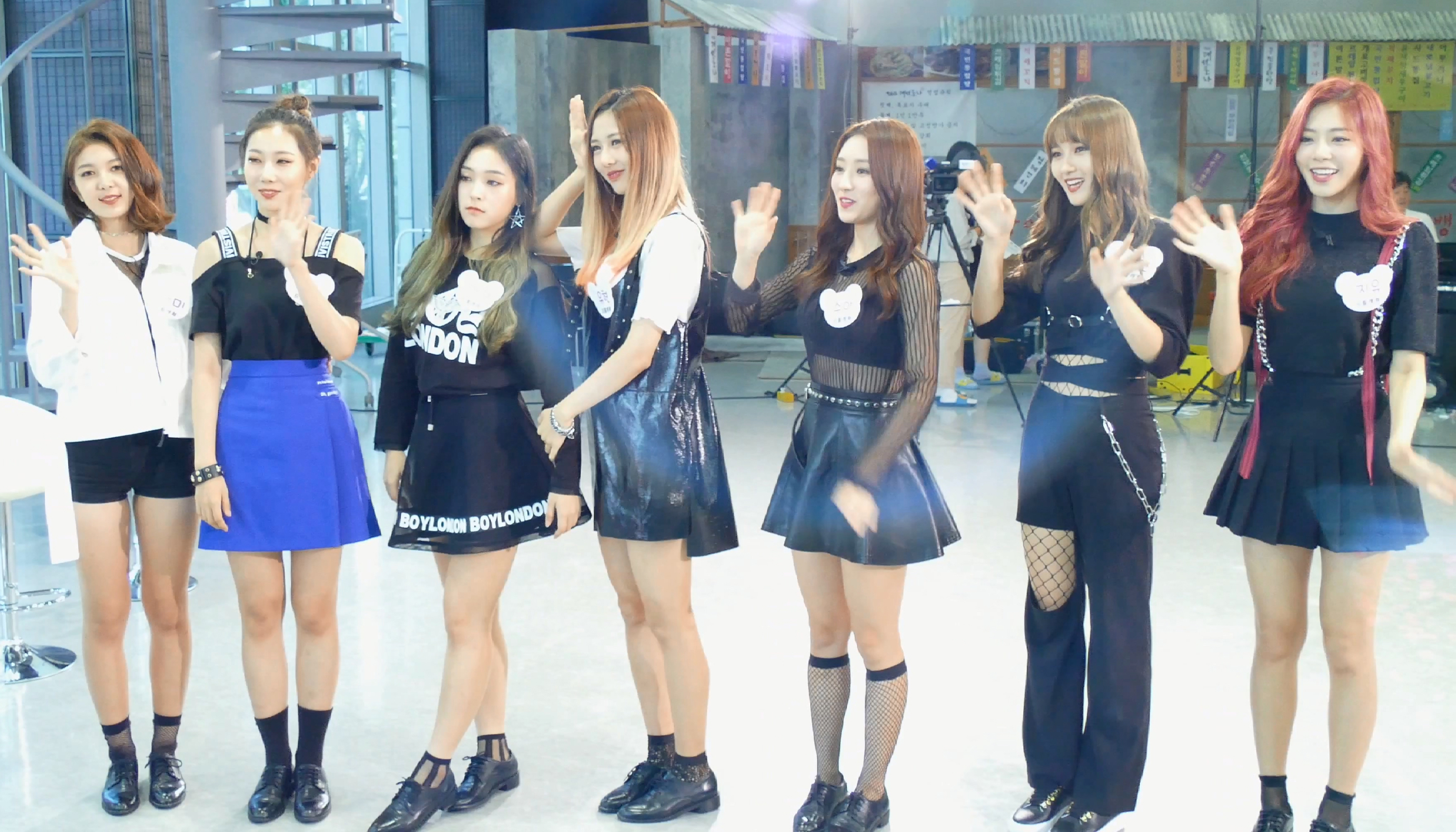
Dreamcatcher on August 22, 2017 From left to right: Dami, Handong, Gahyun, Yoohyeon, SuA, Siyeon, and JiU

On October 3, Happyface Entertainment announced Dreamcatcher's participation in JTBC survival show Mix Nine. However, by December 10, despite JiU's top 9 ranking in the show, Happyface Entertainment announced that all members participating in the show would leave due to a schedule conflict with their tour in Brazil.

From December 1-9, Dreamcatcher held their first tour in Brazil as part of their "Fly High" world tour. All 1,600 seats for their fan signing events across four Brazilian cities had sold out within ten minutes.

On December 8, Dreamcatcher announced a seven-stop tour in Europe in February 2018 as part of their "Fly High" world tour. Happyface Entertainment announced on December 28 that Dreamcatcher would hold a fan meeting on January 13, 2018, to celebrate the first anniversary of their debut with fans. All tickets to the fan meeting sold out in under one minute after sales opened to the public on January 2.

Towards the end of the year, Dreamcatcher received critical acclaim from music critics worldwide for their unique sound that incorporated influences of rock and metal music. "Chase Me" placed at number 19 on Billboard's Best K-Pop Songs of 2017: Critics' Picks, and Dreamcatcher was listed number three on Billboard's Best New K-Pop Acts in 2017.

=== 2018–2019: Rising success, first world tour and international recognition ===
On January 4, 2018, Happyface Entertainment revealed that Dreamcatcher would release a new digital single dedicated to fans in celebration of their first anniversary, composed by Ollounder (오종훈) and Leez (이수민), also composers of Dreamcatcher's previous lead singles "Chase Me" and "Good Night". The digital single "Full Moon" was released alongside a promotional video on January 12. The single peaked at number 16 on the Billboard World Digital Song Sales chart. On January 13, Dreamcatcher held their first anniversary fan meeting at the Mary Hall Grand Theatre at Sogang University, where they performed "Full Moon" for the first time.

In February, Dreamcatcher became the first K-pop girl group to complete a tour of major European cities. The European leg of the "Fly High World Tour" ran from February 14 to February 25, visiting London, Lisbon, Madrid, Amsterdam, Berlin, Warsaw, and Paris.

On March 10, Dreamcatcher held their first domestic solo concert in Seoul, titled "Welcome to the Dream World". At the concert, the group also announced their official fandom name to be "InSomnia", with the meaning of "in dreams".

On May 10, Dreamcatcher released their second EP, Escape the Era. Lead single "You and I" is described as a "metal rock song with orchestral melodies", while album tracks fall within genres ranging from synth pop to metal ballad. Escape the Era's Outside and Inside versions ranked numbers one and three, respectively on Hanteo's album chart, peaking at number three on Gaon and number one on China's Yinyuetai. It debuted on the Billboard World Albums Chart at number seven.

On June 21, Dreamcatcher held their "Welcome to the Dream World in Taipei" concert in Taiwan, starting their second world tour. On July 14, Dreamcatcher held two concerts in Tokyo, Japan as part of their "Welcome to the Dream World" world tour. The next day, Dreamcatcher signed with Japanese record label Pony Canyon, making their Japanese debut in the fall.

On July 27, Dreamcatcher embarked on the Latin American leg of their "Welcome to the Dream World" world tour. The tour ran from July 27 to August 5, with stops in Buenos Aires, Santiago, Lima, Bogota and Panama City. On August 12, Dreamcatcher made their first appearance in the United States, performing at KCON 2018 in Los Angeles.

Their third EP, Alone in the City, was released on September 20, led by title track "What", a song with "symphony and rock sounds". On October 5, it was announced that Dreamcatcher would debut in Japan in November with a Japanese version of their single "What", scheduled for release on November 21. On October 20, Yoohyeon debuted as a runway model for BNB12 at Seoul Fashion Week 2019 S/S.

On February 13, 2019, Dreamcatcher released their fourth EP, The End of Nightmare, the final chapter in the Nightmare series. Lead single "PIRI" incorporates a repeating melody line from its namesake musical instrument. On the same day, Happyface Entertainment announced that they had changed their name to Dreamcatcher Company, as a sign of more support for Dreamcatcher. The End of Nightmare debuted on the Billboard World Albums Chart at number six.

From March to May 2019, Dreamcatcher went on the Asia leg of their "Invitation from Nightmare City" tour, announced to be held in Jakarta, Manila, Singapore, Seoul, and the Japanese cities Tokyo and Kobe. However, due to undisclosed reasons, the concert stop in Jakarta was later canceled; instead, a short fan meeting was held. In July, additional shows for Melbourne, Sydney and Kuala Lumpur were announced, set to take place from late August to early September. The Melbourne stop was unfortunately cancelled the day before the concert due to a fire occurring at the venue. The Sydney and Kuala Lumpur stops were held successfully.

On September 11, Dreamcatcher released their first Japanese studio album titled The Beginning of The End, which included Japanese versions of most of their previous Korean singles and three new Japanese tracks. The music video for lead single "Breaking Out" was released two days prior to the album release.

Siyeon finished as the runner-up in the tvN vocal competition show V-1, airing from September 13 to 15.

On September 18, Dreamcatcher released special EP Raid of Dream. Its lead single "Deja Vu", an orchestral rock song was released in collaboration with the mobile RPG King's Raid, with as A Japanese version of the song was also uploaded simultaneously. Raid of Dream was listed number nine on Billboard's The 25 Best K-pop Albums of 2019: Critics’ Picks.

After "Deja Vu" promotions, Dreamcatcher embarked on the European leg of their "Invitation from Nightmare City" world tour from October 24 to November 7, visiting London, Milan, Berlin, Warsaw, Paris, Amsterdam, and Helsinki. This was the group's second European tour. Thereafter, as part of the same world tour, the group also held their first ever tour in the United States from December 6 to December 15, visiting Los Angeles, Chicago, Dallas, Orlando, and Jersey City. Handong was absent from both Europe and America tours due to at the time unspecified reasons, later revealed to be her participation in Youth With You.

=== 2020–2021: Handong's temporary absence, Dystopia trilogy and breakthrough ===
On February 18, Dreamcatcher released their first full-length Korean studio album, Dystopia: The Tree of Language, along with the music video for the up-tempo EDM-rock title track "Scream". The album was later named by Time magazine as one that defined K-pop's year in 2020 and Dreamcatcher's "best release yet". It ranked 15th on NME's "The 25 best Asian albums of 2020", also lauding the group as "masters of chameleonic pop". "Scream" also placed number 6 on Dazed's "The 40 best K-pop songs of 2020" and number 32 on Paper's "The 40 Best K-pop Songs of 2020".

Dreamcatcher's third Japanese single, "Endless Night", was released on March 11, after its official music video was released a week earlier via Pony Canyon's YouTube channel.

On March 12, Dreamcatcher announced support for Handong's participation in the Chinese idol-producing show Youth With You.

From March 20, Dreamcatcher held a two-week-long follow-up promotion to "Scream" with "Black or White", a Michael Jackson–inspired track from their first studio album.

As part of an ongoing collaboration with MyMusicTaste, Dreamcatcher performed a six-member concert, called "Global Streaming Into The Night & Dystopia", on July 4, the group's first online concert for a global audience. On July 8, Siyeon released the OST track "Good Sera" for the drama Memorials, her second after her Love & Secret OST collaboration "Two of Us" in 2014.

On July 15, Dreamcatcher released epic orchestral rock song "R.o.S.E BLUE", an OST collaboration for the mobile shooting game Girl Cafe Gun.

On August 17, Dreamcatcher released their fifth EP Dystopia: Lose Myself, the second installment of the "Dystopia" series, which became their then best selling album by a wide margin as well as their first release to surpass 100,000 sales. Lead single "Boca", which means 'mouth' in Spanish, is a moombahton rock song warning against irresponsible words that could hurt others.

On October 16, after her return from China was delayed by circumstances surrounding the COVID-19 pandemic, Handong officially rejoined the group, releasing her solo debut song, "First Light of Dawn", on October 19.

On November 7, Dreamcatcher held their second online concert, named "Dystopia: Seven Spirits", the group's first solo concert since Handong's return.

On November 9, Dreamcatcher officially joined the social media platform Weverse. On November 20, Dreamcatcher released their fourth Japanese single "No More". On November 21, Siyeon released her third OST track "No Mind" for the drama Get Revenge. On November 27, Dreamcatcher announced that they would be performing the opening theme song of the anime television series King's Raid: Successors of the Will, titled "Eclipse", their second time collaborating with the King's Raid franchise following "Deja Vu".

On January 26, 2021, Dreamcatcher made their comeback with their sixth EP and the final installment of the "Dystopia" series, Dystopia: Road to Utopia, led by nu-metal single "Odd Eye". Dreamcatcher reached number one on Billboard's Next Big Sound chart for the week of February 13, becoming the first K-pop girl group to do so.

On March 26-27, Dreamcatcher held a two-part online concert named "Crossroads", with the acoustic-led Day 1 subtitled "Utopia" and the performance-based Day 2 subtitled "Dystopia".

On May 14, Dami and Siyeon released an OST "Shadow" for the drama Dark Hole in two versions; the original debuted at number one on K-OSTs chart and number five on the rock genre charts. On July 5, SuA was promoted to be a regular guest on SBS Power FM radio show Wendy's Youngstreet, following her Tuesday guestings since May. On July 25, Dami was featured on the song "BUFFALO" by sunwoojunga.

On July 30, Dreamcatcher made their comeback with the special EP Summer Holiday. Lead single "BEcause" sees the group return to their horror roots with "haunting pizzicato plucks and horror score stings", as well as choreography and a music video inspired by Jordan Peele's Us.

On August 31, Dreamcatcher's contract with their Japanese management Pony Canyon ended.

On October 15, Dreamcatcher returned to the JUMF stage for the second time following their 2017 appearance. Gahyun was also appointed as the MC for the event.

On October 30, Dreamcatcher held their fourth online concert, titled "Halloween Midnight Circus".

=== 2022–present: Apocalypse trilogy, first music show wins, Reason and first sub-unit ===
On April 12, 2022, Dreamcatcher released their second Korean studio album Apocalypse: Save Us and its lead single "Maison". The album contains solo songs written, composed and arranged by the members themselves, and spans a variety of genres from traditional ballad to R&B and jazz. On April 20, the group earned their first music show win with "Maison" on MBC M's Show Champion, 1,924 days after debut, setting a new record for girl groups for the longest time between debut and first win. On April 26, Dreamcatcher wrapped up their promotions with their goodbye stage performance on SBS MTV's The Show, where they earned their second music show win. On April 27, Dreamcatcher Company announced the Apocalypse: Save Us World Tour, scheduled to take place in America from June 28 to July 20, with stops in New York City, Reading, Louisville, Chicago, Minneapolis, Denver, San Francisco, and Los Angeles. After the initial announcement, an additional show was added in Los Angeles as well as Mexico City due to popular demand.

On May 15, Dreamcatcher performed in Frankfurt, Germany at KPOP.FLEX, the largest K-Pop festival ever held in Europe. On June 4, Dreamcatcher were the first Korean act to ever perform at the Primavera Sound Festival, in Barcelona, Spain.

On August 16, SuA released her first OST track, "Still With You", for the drama Café Minamdang. The song is a "dreamy ballad with impressive clear vocals from SuA".

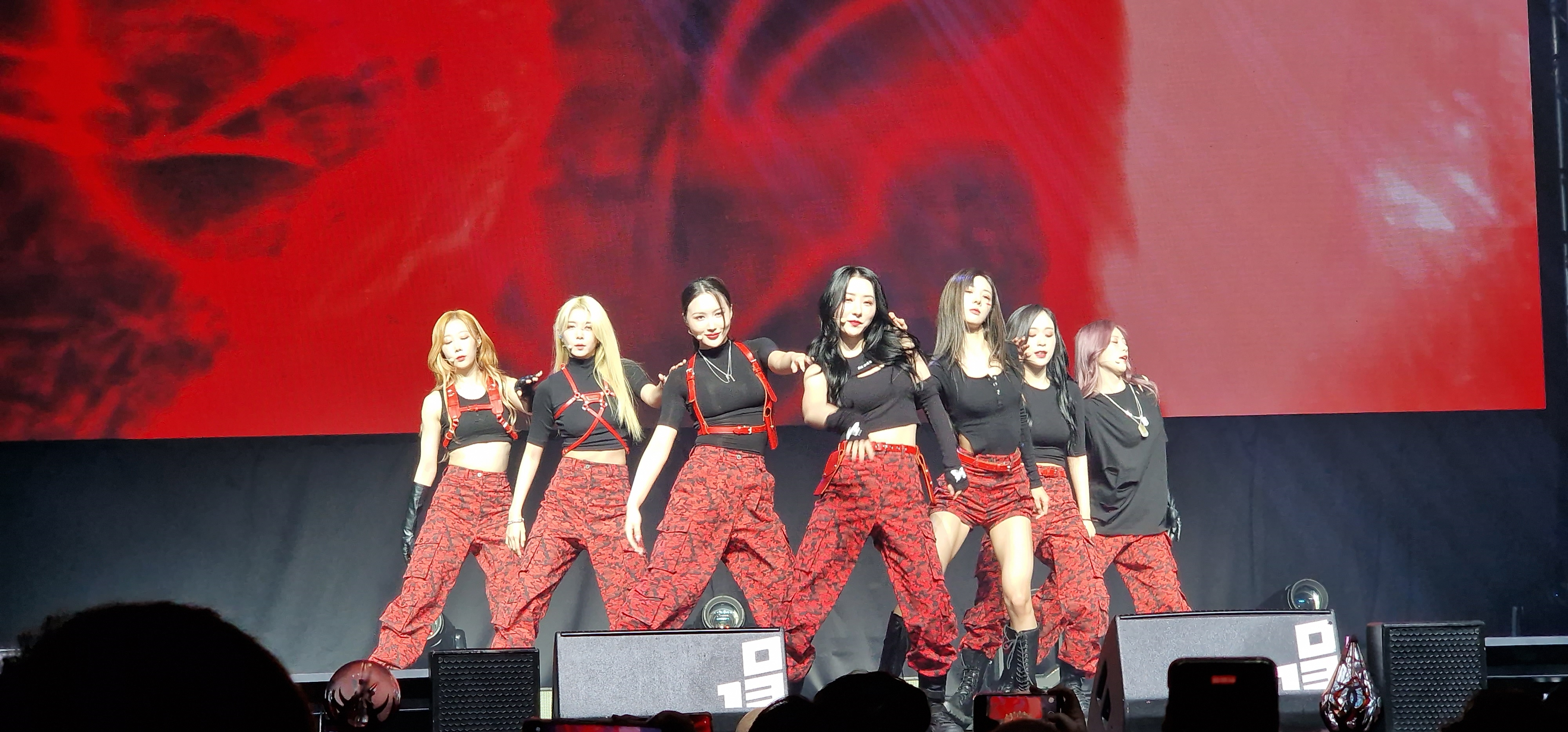
Dreamcatcher performing in November 2022 during their [Apocalypse: Follow Us] tour

On October 4, Dreamcatcher Company announced a new leg of the 2022 world tour, with Dreamcatcher returning to tour Europe for the first time since November 2019. The "Apocalypse: Follow Us" tour was scheduled to start on November 14 and visit five countries: Germany, the Netherlands, Poland, the United Kingdom, and France. On October 11, Dreamcatcher released their seventh EP Apocalypse: Follow Us and lead single "Vision". Dazed ranked "Vision" number 16 on "The best K-pop tracks of 2022".

In November, all seven members of Dreamcatcher renewed their contracts early, before the end of their existing contracts, citing mutual trust between the members and the company.

On January 13, 2023, Dreamcatcher released a special single "Reason", dedicated to fans in celebration of their sixth anniversary. On January 18, the "Reason: Makes Dreamcatcher" US tour was announced, with stops in Atlanta, Washington, D.C., New York City, Reading, Chicago, Denver, Irving, Oakland, and Los Angeles, starting on February 28 and ending on March 20. On April 21, Dreamcatcher performed in Las Vegas, at the inaugural WeBridge Expo 2023.

On May 20, Dreamcatcher performed in a special concert commemorating the first anniversary of the opening of the Blue House.

On May 24, Dreamcatcher released their eighth EP, Apocalypse: From Us, and progressive rock lead single "Bonvoyage", their first album release since last year's contract renewals. This comeback marks their most successful to date, boasting a number 1 peak on the Worldwide iTunes Charts and two music show wins in two consecutive days on The Show and Show Champion. B-side "Demian" placed number 18 on Dazed's "The 50 best K-pop tracks of 2023". On July 26, Dreamcatcher Company announced the Apocalypse: From Us World Tour, scheduled to take place in the US and Canada from September 3 to the 13th, with stops in Montreal, Toronto, Cincinnati, Nashville, and Orlando.

Dreamcatcher performed at the Jeonju Ultimate Music Festival for the third time on August 11. On August 28, they held their first concert in Manila since 2019, titled "Under the Moonlight".

On November 1, it was confirmed that Dreamcatcher would be releasing their ninth EP, Villains, on November 22.

On March 8, 2024, Dreamcatcher released a special single album Luck Inside 7 Doors, with newly arranged concert versions of "Lullaby" and "The Curse of the Spider" dedicated to their fans for the group's 2024 world tour of the same name.

On June 24, it was announced that Dreamcatcher's tenth EP, Virtuous, would be released on July 10. Lead single "Justice" was listed on Dazed's "The 50 best K-pop tracks of 2024" and Billboard's "The 25 Best K-Pop Songs of 2024".

On July 21, Dreamcatcher Company revealed in the official Dreamcatcher fancafe that Gahyun's English stage name had changed from "Gahyeon", which she had been known as since the group's debut. On December 6, it was announced that Dreamcatcher would be releasing a single "My Christmas Sweet Love" on December 20.

On March 10, 2025, it was announced Handong, Gahyun, and Dami would be leaving the company on March 31, but they would not leave the group. It was also announced JiU, SuA, Siyeon, and Yoohyeon would be focusing on other activities. On April 17, the company announced that members JiU, SuA and Yoohyeon would form the group's first sub-unit UAU.

== Artistry ==
Since their rebirth in 2017, Dreamcatcher has maintained a signature rock and metal sound unique amongst their K-pop peers. Now known as 'the Face of Rock in K-Pop' "at the forefront of the resurging rock genre", the band has spoken extensively about rock being "the core of their (musical) identity" despite its nicheness and training their vocal styles to better fit their rock sound. Main vocalist Siyeon in particular has fronted a rock band in high school, and points to Japanese rock band One Ok Rock as her musical influence. JiU cites Japanese kawaii metal band Babymetal, Korean girl group Fin.K.L and Korean singer Jang Na-ra as her inspirations, while SuA cites Korean singer BoA and Korean boy group TVXQ as her inspirations. Yoohyeon cites British girl group Little Mix as her musical influence. Other influences in Dreamcatcher's music include genres such as EDM, R&B, jazz, retro funk, moombahton, pop ballads and orchestral instrumentals.

Dreamcatcher has been credited for inspiring the next generation of K-rock acts, including indie rock band Rolling Quartz.

The group is also known for their powerful rock-based vocals and intense "knife-like dancing" "more powerful than that of boy groups".

Dreamcatcher members have been involved in the writing and composition of their songs in each album. SuA has also choreographed for the group's performances.

== Other ventures ==
=== Ambassadorship ===
On May 11, 2017, Dreamcatcher were appointed public relations ambassador for host province Gangwon-do for the 2018 Pyeongchang Winter Olympics.

On April 28, 2018, Dreamcatcher were appointed public relations ambassador for copyright protection for Microsoft's latest Blockchain Security Technology commercialization and copyright protection campaign.

=== Endorsements ===
In 2021, Dreamcatcher was selected by beauty brand Neogen for a brand collaboration, releasing a special collection of skincare products. In 2023, Neogen selected JiU and Yoohyeon as new models and brand ambassadors. Mobile fashion accessory brand Slash B Slash released a limited edition collaboration of Dreamcatcher-themed Samsung Galaxy products at their second offline pop-up store at WeBridge Expo in Las Vegas.

=== Philanthropy ===
On May 1, 2020, Millenasia Project announced that Dreamcatcher, alongside Korean boy group In2It and female soloist AleXa, would feature in their song "Be The Future". The project, supported by UNESCO's Global Education Coalition, emphasized the importance of maintaining good hygiene practices and expressed gratitude to teaching staff worldwide for their continued efforts in educating students during the COVID-19 pandemic.

On May 16, 2021, the Korea Entertainment Producer's Association (KEPA) released a song to provide comfort during the COVID-19 pandemic, "NOW N NEW 2021", featuring Siyeon and Yoohyeon, alongside sixty other singers.

On April 21, 2022, Dreamcatcher donated 50 million KRW to a school development project.

== Members ==
- JiU (지유) – leader, vocalist
- SuA (수아) – dancer, vocalist
- Siyeon (시연) – vocalist
- Handong (한동) – vocalist
- Yoohyeon (유현) – vocalist
- Dami (다미) – rapper
- Gahyun (가현) – vocalist

== Discography ==
Korean albums

- Dystopia: The Tree of Language (2020)
- Apocalypse: Save Us (2022)

Japanese albums

- The Beginning of the End (2019)

== Concerts ==
=== Headlining ===
Tours

- Dreamcatcher 1st Tour Fly High (2017–2018)
- Dreamcatcher Welcome to the Dream World (2018)
- Dreamcatcher Concert: Invitation from Nightmare City (2019)
- Dreamcatcher World Tour [Apocalypse: Save Us] (2022)
- Dreamcatcher World Tour [Apocalypse: Follow Us] (2022)
- Reason: Makes Dreamcatcher (2023)
- Dreamcatcher World Tour [Apocalypse: From Us] (2023)
- Luck Inside 7 Doors World Tour (2024–2025)

Special concerts

- Dreamcatcher 1st Concert – Fly High in Japan (2017)
- Dreamcatcher 1st Concert in Seoul – Welcome to the Dream World (2018)
- Dreamcatcher Concert: [Apocalypse: Broken Halloween] (2022)
- 7 Doors of Christmas: A Lucky Encore (2024)

Online concerts

- Dreamcatcher Concert Global Streaming Into the Night & Dystopia (2020)
- Dreamcatcher [Dystopia: Seven Spirits] (2020)
- Dreamcatcher Concert Crossroads: Part 1. Utopia & Part 2. Dystopia (2021)
- Dreamcatcher Online Concert: Halloween Midnight Circus (2021)

== Videography ==
=== Music videos ===
List of music videos, showing year released, and name of the director(s)
Year	Title	Director(s)	Ref.
Minx
2014	"Why Did You Come to My Home?"	Kim Se-hee (Korlio)	
2014	"Rockin' Around the Christmas Tree" (with Dal Shabet)	Unknown	
2015	"Love Shake"	Choi	
Dreamcatcher
2017	"Chase Me"	Digipedi	
2017	"Good Night"	Digipedi	
2017	"Fly High"	Yoo Sung-kyun (Sunny Visual Production)	
2018	"You and I"	Yoo Sung-kyun (Sunny Visual Production)	
2018	"What"	Yoo Sung-kyun (Sunny Visual Production)	
2018	"What" (Japanese ver.)	Yoo Sung-kyun (Sunny Visual Production)	
2019	"Piri"	Hong Won-ki (Zanybros)	
2019	"Piri" (Japanese ver.)	Hong Won-ki (Zanybros)	
2019	"Breaking Out"	Dari	
2019	"Deja Vu"	Yoo Sung-kyun (Sunny Visual Production)	
2019	"Deja Vu" (Moving Illustration)	Unknown	
2019	"Deja Vu" (Japanese Ver.) (Moving Illustration)	Unknown	
2020	"Scream"	Yoo Sung-Kyun (Sunny Visual Production)	
2020	"Endless Night"	Wani	
2020	"Sahara"	Dreamcatcher	
2020	"Be the Future" (with Alexa and IN2IT)	Jhyung Shim (Zanybros)	
2020	"R.o.S.E Blue"	Unknown	
2020	"Boca"	Yoo Sung-Kyun (Sunny Visual Production)	
2020	"Break The Wall"	Dreamcatcher	
2020	"No More"	Pokage	
2021	"Odd Eye"	Yoo Sung-Kyun (Sunny Visual Production)	
2021	"Poison Love"	Dreamcatcher	
2021	"Eclipse"	Unknown	
2021	"BEcause"	Yoo Sung-Kyun (Sunny Visual Production)	
2022	"Maison"	Yoo Sung-Kyun (Sunny Visual Production)	
2022	"Vision"	Unknown	
2023	"Reason"	Unknown	
2023	"Bonvoyage"	Yoo Sung-Kyun (Sunny Visual Production)	
2023	"OOTD"	Ziyong Kim (FantazyLab)	
2024	"The Curse of the Spider" (2024 Concert Ver.)	Unknown	
2024	"Justice"	88 Gymnastic Heroes	

== Filmography ==
=== Reality shows ===
Year	Title	Notes	Ref.
2021	Dreamcatcher Mind	Solo series released on the group's YouTube channel; 10 episodes	

=== Television series ===
Year	Title	Notes	Ref.
2020	Backstreet Rookie	Yoohyeon special cameo	

== Awards and nominations ==
Year presented, name of the award ceremony, award category and the result of the nomination
Year	Award	Category	Result	Ref.
2017	Melon Music Awards	New Artist of the Year	Nominated	
2017	Mnet Asian Music Awards	Best New Female Artist	Nominated	
2018	Keum Yeong Star Awards	Promising Idol	Won	
2018	Korea Brand of the Year	Female Idol of the Year	Nominated	
2020	Soribada Best K-Music Awards	Popularity Award	Nominated	
2020	Ten Asia Global Top Ten Awards	Best Artist – Taiwan	Won	
2021	Seoul Music Awards	Main Award (Bonsang)	Nominated	
2021	Seoul Music Awards	K-wave Popularity Award	Nominated	
2021	Seoul Music Awards	Popularity Award	Nominated	
2021	Brand Customer Loyalty Awards	Hot Trend Female Idol Group Award	Nominated	
2021	Asia Artist Awards	Female Idol Group Popularity Award	Nominated	
2022	K Global Heart Dream Awards	Best Music Video	Won	
2022	MAMA Awards	Worldwide Fans' Choice Top 10	Nominated	
2022	Forbes Korea K-Pop Awards	Best K-Pop Idol – Female	Won	
2023	Hanteo Music Awards	Global Artist Award – North America	Won	
2023	Forbes Korea K-Pop Awards	Best K-Pop Idol – Female	Won	
2023	Asia Artist Awards	Best Choice Award	Won	
