= Apocalypse: Save Us =

- S version and digital cover

Studio album by Dreamcatcher
- Released: April 12, 2022
- Recorded: 2021–2022
- Genres: Dance; rock; ballad
- Length: 44:22
- Languages: Korean; English
- Labels: Dreamcatcher; Genie; Sony
- Producers: Leez; Ollounder

Dreamcatcher chronology
Summer Holiday (2021)	Apocalypse: Save Us (2022)	Apocalypse: Follow Us (2022)

Singles from Apocalypse: Save Us
- 1. "Maison" Released: April 12, 2022

Apocalypse: Save Us is the second Korean studio album by South Korean girl group Dreamcatcher. It was released on April 12, 2022, by Dreamcatcher Company, and distributed by Sony Music. Apocalypse: Save Us features fourteen tracks including the lead single "Maison", as well as seven solo songs, and is available in "S", (Note: "S" version was released as a limited edition of the series) "A", "V", "E" versions and a jewel case (Note: Released exclusively in USA) version.

This album is the start of Dreamcatcher's new Apocalypse series after the conclusion of the previous series Dystopia. Commercially, the album sold over 136,239 copies. The group also collected their first music show win of their career with "Maison" on MBC M's Show Champion. The album received generally favorable reviews by the critics.

== Background and release ==
On March 24, 2022, Dreamcatcher released the mystery code teaser for their upcoming April comeback. The group's Mystery Code teasers signal the start of a new era as they gear up for a return. It was later revealed that Dreamcatcher will be making their return on April 12.

Official teasers for the album were first released on March 28, starting with a track list, followed by individual and group concept photos, a highlight medley, a dance preview, a story preview and a music video teaser. The album and the music video for the album were released on April 12, 2022. The group commemorated the release by hosting a special mini-concert in Korea, which was also available as an online stream for international fans. A world tour titled 2022 Dreamcatcher World Tour [Apocalypse: Save Us] associated with the album was announced on April 27, 2022, initially featuring eight shows in the United States. Two more dates for the tour (Mexico City and a second show in Los Angeles) were announced on June 14, 2022.

== Composition ==
The title track "Maison" is a song described as a "cry for help" to save the Earth from the apocalypse caused by global warming, environmental pollution, and human indifference. The title of the song was hidden through the morse code '321124433433' in the first album teaser. Maison is French for home, referencing the only known habitable planet; Earth. The other tracks include an intro titled "Intro: Save Us," "Locked Inside A Door," retro synth-pop "Starlight", deep house-based "Together," the ballad "Always," and the second instrumental track "Skit: The Seven Doors." The album holds more significance for the group's members as it includes a solo song produced by each of the members. Overall production was handled by composers Leez and Ollounder, who have collaborated before for Dreamcatcher's Nightmare and Dystopia worldviews.

== Promotion ==
=== Apocalypse: Save Us World Tour ===
Apocalypse: Save Us World Tour
- World tour by Dreamcatcher
- Associated album: Apocalypse: Save Us
- Start date: June 28, 2022
- End date: July 20, 2022
- No. of shows: 10

Dreamcatcher concert chronology
- Dreamcatcher Concert: Invitation from Nightmare City; Dreamcatcher World Tour [Apocalypse : Save us]

On April 27, 2022, Dreamcatcher announced the 2022 Dreamcatcher World Tour [Apocalypse: Save Us], scheduled to take place from June 28 to July 2022. Ticket sales for Dreamcatcher's new concert began on June 15 at 8:00 AM PST through Ticketmaster. The North American leg of their tour was originally set to conclude in Los Angeles, but the group has also since added a new show in Mexico City at the Auditorio BB on July 20.

List of confirmed dates and venues
Date	City	Country	Venue
North America
June 28, 2022	New York City	United States	Palladium Times Square
July 1, 2022	Reading	United States	Santander Arena
July 3, 2022	Louisville	United States	Old Forester's Paristown Hall
July 7, 2022	Chicago	United States	Radius Chicago
July 9, 2022	Minneapolis	United States	Skyway Theatre
July 12, 2022	Denver	United States	Fillmore Auditorium
July 14, 2022	San Francisco	United States	The Midway
July 16, 2022	Los Angeles	United States	The Wiltern
July 17, 2022	Los Angeles	United States	The Wiltern
July 20, 2022	Mexico City	Mexico	Auditorio BB (BlackBerry)

== Commercial performance ==
As of May 2022, the album sold over 136,239 copies. It debuted on number 4 on Gaon Weekly Album Chart and went on to peak at number 8 on Gaon Monthly Album Chart with 126,654 sales for the month of April. According to Hanteo Charts, the album sold more than 85,000 copies first week since its release with 54,131 copies sold on the first day of release. Dreamcatcher had their debut peak on The Official Finnish Charts, reaching number 26. They also earned their first music show win of their career (1,924 days after their debut in 2017) with "Maison" on MBC M's Show Champion. On April 26, Dreamcatcher officially wrapped up their promotions with their goodbye stage performance on SBS MTV's The Show, where they earned their second music show win. The music video has amassed 29 million views as of March 2024.

== Reception ==
Professional ratings
Review scores
Source	Rating
NME	3/5 stars

Tanu Raj for NME gave 3 out of 5 stars and wrote "while Dreamcatcher tackle climate change on their second studio offering, the effort does seem a tad misplaced in the face of the album's youthful optimism and that keeping a frantic pace throughout, "Maison" underlines an urgency that seems to be missing in many when it comes to climate change."

== Track listing ==
Apocalypse: Save Us track listing
No.	Title	Lyrics	Music	Arrangement	Length
1.	"Intro: Save Us"		Leez; Ollounder	Leez; Ollounder	1:01
2.	"Locked Inside a Door"	Leez; Ollounder; Maddox; D.Van	Leez; Ollounder; Buddy	Leez; Ollounder; Buddy	3:07
3.	"Maison"	Leez; Ollounder	Leez; Ollounder	Leez; Ollounder	3:05
4.	"Starlight"	Leez; Ollounder	Leez; Ollounder; Max Borghetti	Leez; Ollounder	3:19
5.	"Together"	Leez; Ollounder	Leez; Ollounder; Maddox	Leez; Ollounder	3:44
6.	"Always"	Leez; Ollounder	Leez; Ollounder	Leez; Ollounder	4:29
7.	"Skit: The Seven Doors"		Leez; Ollounder	Leez; Ollounder	1:45
8.	"Cherry (Real Miracle)" (performed by JiU)	Ollounder; JiU	Ollounder; JiU; Peperoni	Ollounder; JiU; Peperoni	3:15
9.	"No Dot" (performed by SuA)	Leez; Ollounder; SuA; Oliv	Leez; Ollounder; SuA; Oliv	Leez; Ollounder; SuA; Oliv	3:19
10.	"Entrancing" (极夜; performed by Siyeon)	Leez; Siyeon; Kim Jun-hyeok	Leez; Siyeon; Kim Jun-hyeok	Leez; Siyeon; Kim Jun-hyeok	3:32
11.	"Winter" (performed by Handong)	Ollounder; Handong; Han Soo-seok	Ollounder; Handong; Han Soo-seok	Ollounder; Han Soo-seok	3:51
12.	"For" (performed by Yoohyeon)	Yoohyeon; Buddy; Maddox	Yoohyeon; Buddy; Ollounder	Yoohyeon; Buddy; Ollounder	3:44
13.	"Beauty Full" (performed by Dami)	Leez; Dami; Kim Jun-hyeok	Leez; Dami; Kim Jun-hyeok	Leez; Dami; Kim Jun-hyeok	3:03
14.	"Playground" (performed by Gahyeon)	Leez; Ga-hyeon; Han Soo-seok	Leez; Ga-hyeon; Han Soo-seok	Leez; Han Soo-seok	3:01
Total length:					42:23

== Personnel ==
- Leez – producing, lyrics, music, arrangement (12 tracks), MIDI programming, background vocals (track 2), synthesizer
- Ollounder – producing, lyrics, music, arrangement (12 tracks), MIDI programming, guitar
- Maddox – lyrics (track 2), music (track 5, 12)
- Max Borghetti – music (track 4)
- D.Van – lyrics (track 2)
- Buddy – lyrics (track 12), music, arrangement, bass, piano (tracks 2, 12)
- Kim Jun-hyeok – lyrics, music, arrangement (track 9, 13), bass, synthesizer
- Jeon Jae-hee – background vocals
- Sangyun – electric guitar
- Ji Yu-min – guitar
- Peperoni – music, arrangement, synthesizer (track 8)
- Oliv – lyrics, music, arrangement (track 9), MIDI programming
- Han Soo-seok – lyrics, music, arrangement (track 11, 14), piano, MIDI programming
- Lee Sang-beom – guitar (track 2)
- Shim Sang-yeop – choir
- Kim Soo-hee – piano
- Yeon Chang-jum – guitar
- SuA – lyrics, music, arrangement (track 9)
- Siyeon – lyrics, music, arrangement (track 10), background vocals (track 3)
- JiU – lyrics, music, arrangement (track 8)
- Handong – lyrics, music (track 11)
- Yoohyeon – lyrics, music, arrangement (track 12), background vocals (track 2)
- Dami – lyrics, music, arrangement (track 13)
- Gahyeon – lyrics, music (track 14)

== Charts ==
=== Weekly charts ===
Weekly chart performance for Apocalypse: Save Us
Chart (2022)	Peak position
Finnish Albums (Suomen virallinen lista)	26
South Korean Albums (Gaon)	4

=== Monthly charts ===
Monthly chart performance for Apocalypse: Save Us
Chart (2022)	Position
South Korean Albums (Gaon)	8

== Sales ==
Region	Certification	Certified units/sales
South Korea	—	136,239

== Accolades ==
Music program awards
Song	Title	Network	Date	Ref.
"Maison"	Show Champion	MBC M	April 20, 2022	
"Maison"	The Show	SBS MTV	April 26, 2022	

Mid-year lists
Publication	List	Rank	Ref.
Time	The Best K-pop Songs and Albums of 2022 So Far (Albums)	—N/a	

Year-end lists
Publication	List	Rank	Ref.
Idology	Top 20 Albums of 2022	—N/a	

== Release history ==
Release history for Apocalypse: Save Us
Region	Date	Format	Label
South Korea	April 12, 2022	CD	Dreamcatcher Company; Sony Music
Various	April 12, 2022	Digital download; streaming	Dreamcatcher Company; Sony Music
