= EXID discography =

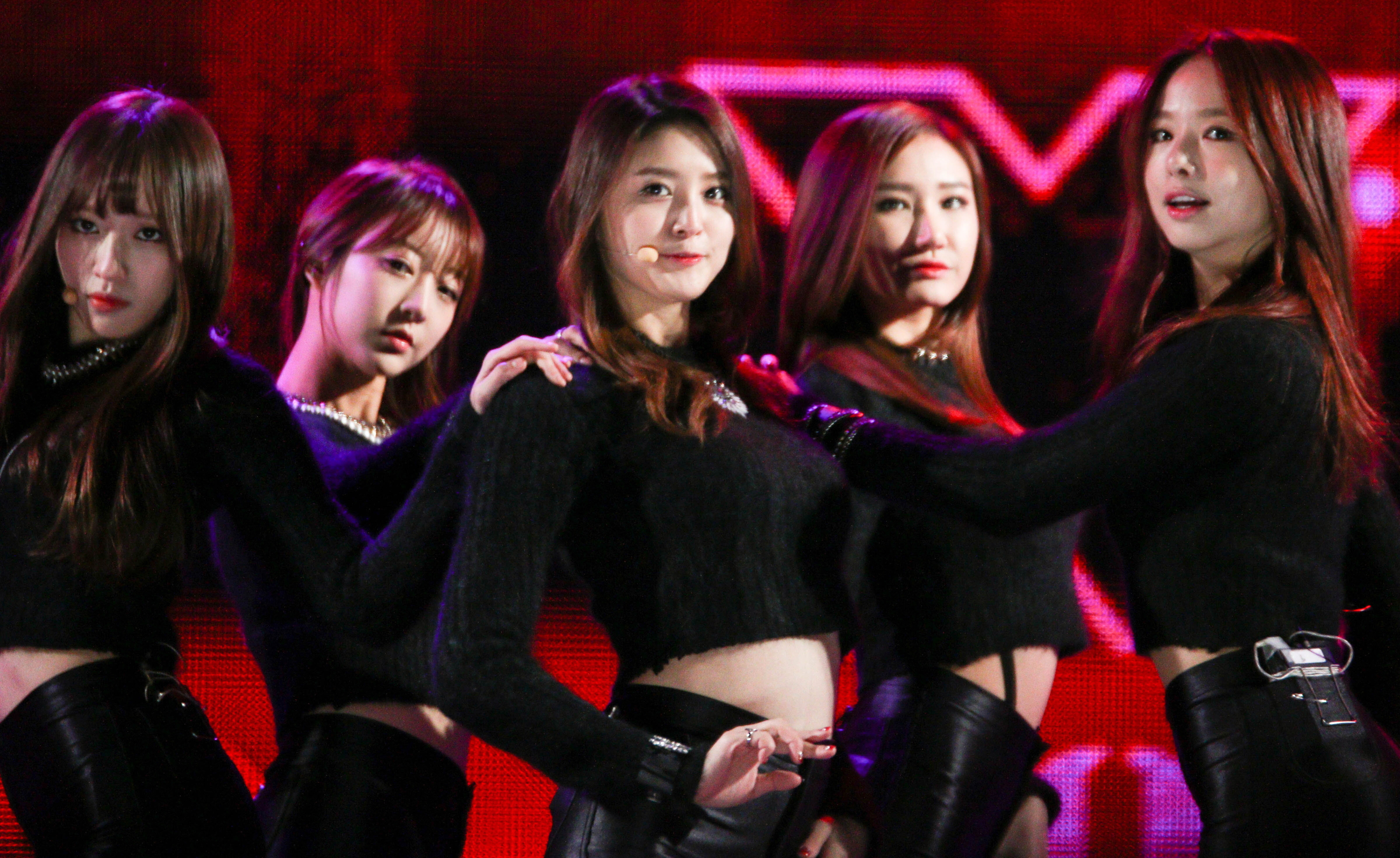
- EXID performing in December 2014
- Studio albums: 3
- EPs: 5
- Compilation albums: 1
- Singles: 21
- Music videos: 14
- Single albums: 2
- Live albums: 1
- Collaborative singles: 1
- Soundtrack appearances: 3

South Korean girl group EXID has released three studio albums, one compilation album, five extended plays, and twenty-one singles. The group debuted in 2012 with the single "Whoz That Girl" to modest success. After subsequent lineup changes, EXID made their breakthrough with the song "Up & Down" in 2014, which topped the Gaon Single Charts and gave them their first music show win.

== Albums ==
=== Studio albums ===
List of studio albums, with selected details and chart positions
| Title | Album details | Peak chart positions | | | | Sales |
| Title | Album details | KOR | JPN | JPN Hot | US World | Sales |
|---|---|---|---|---|---|---|
| Street | Released: June 1, 2016 (KOR); Label: Banana Culture; Formats: CD, digital download | 2 | 161 | — | 9 | KOR: 21,278 |
| Trouble | Released: April 3, 2019 (JPN); Label: Tokuma Japan; Formats: CD, digital download | — | 12 | 23 | — | JPN: 4,831 |
| B.L.E.S.S.E.D | Released: August 19, 2020 (JPN); Label: Tokuma Japan; Formats: CD, digital download | — | 16 | 28 | — | JPN: 2,668 |
"—" denotes releases that did not chart or were not released in that region.

=== Compilation albums ===
List of compilation albums, with selected details and chart positions
| Title | Album details | Peak chart positions |
| Title | Album details | JPN |
|---|---|---|
| Japan Activity Best | Released: September 2, 2022 (JPN); Label: Tokuma Japan; Format: CD | 37 |

=== Video albums ===
List of video albums, with selected details and chart positions
| Title | Album details | Peak chart positions |
| Title | Album details | JPN |
|---|---|---|
| EXID 1st Japan Live Tour 2018 | Released: December 19, 2018; Label: Tokuma Japan; Formats: DVD | 46 |

== Extended plays ==
List of extended plays, with selected chart positions and sales
| Title | Details | Peak chart positions | | Sales |
| Title | Details | KOR | US World | Sales |
|---|---|---|---|---|
| Hippity Hop | Released: August 13, 2012 (KOR); Label: AB Entertainment; Formats: CD, digital download | 13 | — | KOR: 1,554 |
| Ah Yeah | Released: April 13, 2015 (KOR); Label: Yedang Entertainment; Formats: CD, digital download | 5 | 12 | KOR: 23,118; JPN: 7000+ |
| Eclipse | Released: April 10, 2017 (KOR); Label: Banana Culture; Formats: CD, digital download | 5 | 4 | KOR: 15,102 |
| Full Moon | Released: November 7, 2017 (KOR); Label: Banana Culture; Formats: CD, digital download | 7 | 6 | KOR: 17,156 |
| We | Released: May 15, 2019 (KOR); Label: Banana Culture; Formats: CD, digital download | 3 | 8 | KOR: 24,472 |

== Single albums ==
List of single albums, with selected details
| Title | Details | Peak chart positions | Sales |
| Title | Details | KOR | Sales |
|---|---|---|---|
| Holla | Released: February 16, 2012 (KOR); Label: AB Entertainment; Formats: Digital download | – | |
| X | Released: September 29, 2022 (KOR); Label: Sony Music Korea; Formats: CD, digital download | 14 | KOR: 20,152 |

== Singles ==
List of singles, with selected chart positions, showing year released and album name
| Title | Year | Peak chart positions | | | | | | Sales (Note: Sales figures for tracks are based on digital downloads, except noted.) | Album |
| Title | Year | KOR | KOR Billb. | JPN | JPN Hot | NZ Hot | US World | Sales | Album |
|---|---|---|---|---|---|---|---|---|---|
| "Whoz That Girl" | 2012 | 36 | 33 | — | — | — | — | KOR: 611,529 | Holla |
| "I Feel Good" | 2012 | 56 | — | — | — | — | — | KOR: 91,177 | Hippity Hop |
| "Every Night" (매일밤) | 2012 | 43 | — | — | — | — | — | KOR: 70,352 | Ah Yeah |
| "Up & Down" (위아래) (Note: On January 10, 2017, "Up & Down" was released as EXID's debut Chinese single. The song was released on August 22, 2018 in Japan as their debut Japanese single.) | 2014 | 1 | — (Note: The Korea K-Pop Hot 100 chart on Billboard was discontinued beginning with the July 16, 2014, issue date and re-established on the issue dated May 29 – June 4, 2017. Therefore, charting for singles released by the artist within this period is not available.) | 7 | 41 | — | — | KOR: 1,496,815; JPN: 9,751 | Ah Yeah |
| "Ah Yeah" (아예) | 2015 | 2 | — | — | — | — | 6 | KOR: 1,057,024 | Ah Yeah |
| "Hot Pink" (핫핑크) | 2015 | 4 | — | — | — | — | 9 | KOR: 685,603 | Street |
| "L.I.E" (엘라이) | 2016 | 7 | — | — | — | — | 16 | KOR: 518,819 | Street |
| "Cream" | 2016 | — | — | — | — | — | — | — | Non-album single |
| "Night Rather Than Day" (낮보다는 밤) | 2017 | 9 | 47 | — | — | — | — | KOR: 311,781 | Eclipse |
| "DDD" (덜덜덜) | 2017 | 9 | 13 | — | — | — | 6 | KOR: 348,131 | Full Moon |
| "Dreamer" (꿈에) | 2018 | — | — | — | — | — | — | — | Re:flower Project |
| "Don't Want a Drive" (데려다 줄래) | 2018 | — (Note: "Don't Want a Drive" did not enter the Gaon Digital Chart, but appeared at number 78 on the component Download Chart.) | — | — | — | — | — | — | Re:flower Project |
| "Lady" (내일해) | 2018 | 32 | 37 | — | — | — | 9 | KOR: 14,953 (Phy.) | Lady |
| "How Why" | 2018 | — | — | — | — | — | — | — | Re:flower Project |
| "A Sul Hae" (아슬해) | 2018 | — | — | — | — | — | — | — | Re:flower Project |
| "Better Together (Remastered 2018)" | 2018 | — | — | — | — | — | — | — | Re:flower Project |
| "I Love You" (알러뷰) | 2018 | 29 | 21 | — | — | 34 | 5 | KOR: 15,999 (Phy.); US: 1,000 | Non-album single |
| "Me&You" | 2019 | 90 | 68 | — | — | — | 15 | — | We |
| "Trouble" | 2019 | — | — | — | — | — | — | — | Trouble |
| "Bad Girl for You" | 2019 | — | — | 14 | 95 | — | — | JPN: 10,622 | B.L.E.S.S.E.D |
| "Fire" (불이나) | 2022 | — (Note: "Fire" did not enter the Circle Digital Chart, but peaked at number 27 on the Circle Download Chart.) | — | — | — | — | — | — | X |
"—" denotes releases that did not chart or were not released in that region.

=== Subgroup ===
Members Hani and Solji form a subgroup called Dasoni in 2013, and later changed the name to SoljiHani in 2016. They have released three singles–two credited as Dasoni, and one credited as SoljiHani.

| Title | Year | Peak position | Sales | Album |
| Title | Year | KOR | Sales | Album |
|---|---|---|---|---|
| "Good Bye" (Note: Credited as Dasoni) | 2013 | 71 | KOR: 63,662 | Non-album single |
| "Said So Often" (Stage version) | 2013 | 188 | — | Stage of the 70's (digital single) |
| "Only One" (Note: Credited as SoljiHani) | 2016 | 24 | KOR: 171,055+ | Street |

== Other charted songs ==
List of songs, with selected chart positions and sales figures, showing year released and album name
| Title | Year | Peak chart positions | Sales | Album |
| Title | Year | KOR | Sales | Album |
|---|---|---|---|---|
| "Thrilling" | 2015 | 52 | KOR: 38,001+ | Ah Yeah |
| "With Out U" | 2015 | 100 | KOR: 20,966+ | Ah Yeah |
| "Will You Take Me?" | 2016 | 67 | KOR: 51,341+ | Street |
| "3%" | 2016 | 179 | KOR: 15,969+ | Street |
| "Hello" | 2016 | 199 | KOR: 14,721+ | Street |
| "I Know" | 2016 | 213 | KOR: 13,154+ | Street |
| "Cream" | 2016 | 288 | KOR: 10,485+ | Street |
| "Summer, Fall, Winter, Spring" | 2016 | 320 | KOR: 9,553+ | Street |
| "Of Course" | 2016 | 333 | KOR: 9,246+ | Street |
| "Only One" (as 5 member) | 2016 | 337 | KOR: 9,134+ | Street |
| "Good" | 2016 | 351 | KOR: 8,967+ | Street |
| "Are You Hungry?" | 2016 | 361 | KOR: 8,467+ | Street |
"—" denotes releases that did not chart or were not released in that region.

== Soundtrack appearances ==
List of soundtrack appearances as lead artist, with selected chart positions and sales figures, showing year released and album name
| Title | Year | Peak chart positions | Sales (digital downloads) | Album |
| Title | Year | KOR | Sales (digital downloads) | Album |
|---|---|---|---|---|
| "Hey Boy" | 2012 | — | — | The Thousandth Man OST |
| "Up & Down" | 2013 | 53 | KOR: 51,000+ | Incarnation of Money OST Part 2 |
| "You Like Me, I Like You" (너 나 좋아해 나 너 좋아해) | 2015 | — | — | Immortal Songs: Singing the Legend (Musical Families Special) |
| "Poison" (포이즌) (Solji, LE and Hyelin) | 2015 | — | — | Immortal Songs: Singing the Legend (Joo Young-hoon Part 2) |
| "Now, Hips" (자~엉덩이) | 2018 | — | — | Two Yoo Project Sugar Man 2 Part.12 |
"—" denotes releases that did not chart or were not released in that region.

== Music videos ==
List of music videos, showing year released and director
| Title | Year | Director(s) | Ref. |
|---|---|---|---|
| "Whoz That Girl" | 2012 | Hong Won-ki | |
| "I Feel Good" | 2012 | Hong Won-ki | |
| "I Feel Good (R.Tee Remix)" | 2012 | Joo Tae-woong | |
| "Every Night" | 2012 | APRILSHOWER FILM | |
| "Goodbye" (as Dasoni) | 2013 | Kang Seong-gyu & Park Seong-hoo | |
| "Up & Down" | 2014 | Digipedi | |
| "Up & Down" (Special version for LG U+) | 2015 | Kim Eun-you | |
| "Ah Yeah" | 2015 | Naive Creative Production | |
| "Hot Pink" | 2015 | Digipedi | |
| "L.I.E" | 2016 | August Frogs | |
| "L.I.E" (Dance version) | 2016 | Tiger Cave | |
| "Cream" (Chinese Version) | 2016 | Unknown | |
| "Up & Down" (Chinese Version) | 2017 | Unknown | |
| "Night Rather Than Day" | 2017 | Tiger Cave | |
| "DDD" | 2017 | Digipedi | |
| "Lady" | 2018 | Honey Badger | |
| "Up & Down" (Japanese Version) | 2018 | Tiger Cave | |
| "I Love You" | 2018 | Tiger Cave | |
| "Me&You" | 2019 | Tiger Cave | |
| "Vaporize Yourself" | 2019 | Unknown | |
| "We Are" | 2019 | Unknown | |
| "Trouble" | 2019 | Tiger Cave | |
| "Bad Girl for You" | 2019 | Tiger Cave | |
| "B.L.E.S.S.E.D" | 2020 | Cho Hyun Jin | |
| "Fire" | 2022 | Unknown | |
