= We (EXID EP) =

EP by EXID
- Released: May 15, 2019
- Genre: K-pop; moombahton; deep house; R&B
- Length: 24:07
- Language: Korean
- Label: Banana Culture
- Producer: Shinsadong Tiger; LE; Beverly Kidz; Changhyun

EXID chronology
| Trouble (2019) | We (2019) | B.L.E.S.S.E.D (2020) |

Singles from We
- 1. "Me&You" Released: May 15, 2019

We (stylized in all caps) is the fifth extended play by South Korean girl group EXID. It was released on May 15, 2019 by Banana Culture. The EP marked their last release as a group in South Korea prior to a three-year hiatus as well as their final release under Banana Culture overall.

== Background ==
On May 3, 2019, Banana Culture announced that members Hani and Jeonghwa decided to not renew their contracts with the agency. Meanwhile, members LE, Solji, and Hyelin decided to renew their contracts with the agency, stating that the group will not disband.

On the same day, Banana Culture informed that the group will release their fifth mini-album on May 15 and after the release and promotions for this album, the group will take an indefinite hiatus. It was also noted that members Hani and Jeonghwa agreed to promote the album.

== Commercial performance ==
We debuted at number 8 on the US World Albums Chart for the week ending May 25, 2019. This is their fifth album to chart and their fourth top 10.

The EP was the 15th best-selling album in May 2019 with 24,423 physical copies sold.

== Track listing ==
| No. | Title | Lyrics | Music | Arrangement | Length |
|---|---|---|---|---|---|
| 1. | "Me & You" | Shinsadong Tiger; Beverly Kidz; LE | Shinsadong Tiger; Beverly Kidz; LE | Shinsadong Tiger | 3:24 |
| 2. | "We Are.." | Shinsadong Tiger; LE; Solji; Hani; Hyelin; Jeonghwa | Shinsadong Tiger; LE | Shinsadong Tiger | 3:52 |
| 3. | "The Vibe" (아끼지마) | Shinsadong Tiger; LE | Shinsadong Tiger; LE | Shinsadong Tiger | 3:22 |
| 4. | "How You Doin'" (어떻게지내) | Beverly Kidz; LE | Beverly Kidz; LE | Beverly Kidz | 3:07 |
| 5. | "Midnight" (나의밤) | Changhyun (Trei); LE | Changhyun (Trei); LE | Changhyun (Trei) | 3:34 |
| 6. | "Lady" (Urban Mix) | Shinsadong Tiger; LE; V!VE | Shinsadong Tiger; LE | Shinsadong Tiger | 3:24 |
| 7. | "Me & You" (instrumental) | | Shinsadong Tiger; Beverly Kidz; LE | Shinsadong Tiger | 3:24 |
| Total length: | | | | | 24:07 |

== Charts ==
| Chart (2019) | Peak position |
|---|---|
| French Digital Albums (SNEP) | 133 |
| South Korean Albums (Gaon) | 3 |
| US World Albums (Billboard) | 8 |

== Release history ==
| Region | Date | Format | Label |
|---|---|---|---|
| Various | May 15, 2019 | Digital download, streaming | Banana Culture |
| South Korea | May 16, 2019 | CD | Banana Culture |
