= 2016 Idol Star Athletics Ssireum Futsal Archery Championships =

- Also known as: 2016 Idol Star Olympics Championships New Year Special
- Genre: Sports; Variety show
- Directed by: Jo Wook-hyung; Kang Sung-ah
- Presented by: Jun Hyun-moo; Kim Jung-geun; Jo Kwon; Lee Hyeri; Leeteuk; Lee Sung-bae; Hwang Kwanghee; Heo Il-hoo
- Starring: Around 180 Idols
- Country of origin: South Korea
- Original language: Korean
- No. of episodes: 2

Production
- Production locations: Goyang Gymnasium; Jungangro 1601, Ilsanseo-gu, Goyang, Gyeonggi-do
- Running time: Tuesday, Wednesday on 17:45 ~

Original release
- Network: MBC
- Release: February 9 – February 10, 2016

The 2016 Idol Star Athletics Ssireum Futsal Archery Championships (Korean: 아이돌스타 육상 씨름 풋살 양궁 선수권대회) was held at Goyang Gymnasium in Goyang, South Korea on January 18 and 19 and was broadcast on MBC on February 9 and 10, 2016. At the championships, a total number of 9 events (4 in athletics, 2 in ssireum, 2 in archery and 1 in futsal) were contested: 4 by men, 4 by women and 1 mixed. There were around 180 K-pop singers and celebrities who participated, divided into seven teams.

== Cast ==
=== Main ===
- Team Beat to the end: BTS, Got7, Twice, Bestie
- Team Veteran: 4Minute, Beast, Apink, Roh Ji-hoon, BtoB, CLC
- Team Star Wars: Exo, AOA, B.A.P, Red Velvet, Lovelyz, N.Flying
- Team Yeo-vengers: Girl's Day, Nine Muses, Dal Shabet, EXID, Mamamoo, Minx, Sonamoo, GFriend
- Team Nom Nom Nom: Teen Top, VIXX, Myname, A-JAX, 100%, Yoo Seung-woo, Madtown
- Team Secret Weapon: Melody Day, Uniq, NU'EST, Big Star, A.cian, The Legend
- Team Overnight puppy: Monsta X, Seventeen, UP10TION, Snuper, Oh My Girl, April, DIA, Imfact

== Results ==
=== Men ===
Athletics

Event	Gold	Silver	Bronze
60 m (24 contestants)	"Veteran"; Minhyuk (BtoB)	"Overnight Puppy"; Woosung (Snuper)	"Overnight Puppy"; Jooheon (Monsta X)
4 × 100 m	"Beat to the end" J-Hope (BTS); Jimin (BTS); Jungkook (BTS); Suga (BTS)	"Star Wars"; Daehyun (B.A.P); Himchan (B.A.P); Jongup (B.A.P); Youngjae (B.A.P)	"Nom Nom Nom"; Hyuk (VIXX); Ken (VIXX); Leo (VIXX); Ravi (VIXX)

Ssireum

Event	Gold	Silver	Bronze
Men's team	"Nom Nom Nom"; Hyuk (VIXX); Ken (VIXX); Leo (VIXX)	"Beat to the end" Jin (BTS); Jungkook (BTS); V (BTS)	

Futsal

Event	Gold	Silver	Bronze
Futsal	FC Cheongdam	Goaldae-Sliga	

=== Women ===
Athletics

Event	Gold	Silver	Bronze
60 m (24 contestants)	"Yeo-vengers"; Yuju (GFriend)	"Beat to the end" UJi (BESTie)	"Overnight Puppy"; Binnie (Oh My Girl)
4 × 100 m	"Veteran"; Namjoo (Apink); Chorong (Apink); Naeun (Apink); Bomi (Apink)	"Yeo-vengers"; Hyelin (EXID); Junghwa (EXID); LE (EXID); Solji (EXID)	"Yeo-vengers"; SinB (GFriend); Sowon (GFriend); Yerin (GFriend); Yuju (GFriend)

Ssireum

Event	Gold	Silver	Bronze
Women's team	"Yeo-vengers"; Hyelin (EXID); LE (EXID); Solji (EXID)	"Beat to the end" Jeongyeon (Twice); Momo (Twice); Nayeon (Twice)	

Archery

Event	Gold	Silver	Bronze
Women's team	"Yeo-vengers"; Hyelin (EXID); Junghwa (EXID); Solji (EXID)	"Star Wars"; Irene (Red Velvet); Seulgi (Red Velvet); Yeri (Red Velvet)	

=== Mixed ===
Archery

Event	Gold	Silver	Bronze
Mixed team	"Veteran"; Seungyeon (CLC); Yujin (CLC); Eunkwang (BtoB); Sungjae (BtoB)	"Star Wars"; Jimin (AOA); Mina (AOA) "Nom Nom Nom"; Hyuk (VIXX); N (VIXX)	

== Ratings ==
Episode #	Original broadcast date	TNmS Ratings		AGB Nielsen Ratings	
Episode #	Original broadcast date	Nationwide	Seoul National Capital Area	Nationwide	Seoul National Capital Area
1	February 9, 2016	7.7%	8.1%	7.9%	8.0%
2	February 10, 2016	%	%	%	%
