= 2016 Idol Star Athletics Rhythmic Gymnastics Futsal Archery Championships =

- Also known as: 2016 Idol Star Olympics Championships Chuseok Special
- Genre: Sports; Variety show
- Directed by: Kim Myung-jin
- Presented by: Jun Hyun-moo; Lee Hyeri; Lee Soo-geun; Yang Se-hyung; Heo Il-hoo
- Starring: Around 200 Idols
- Country of origin: South Korea
- Original language: Korean
- No. of episodes: 2

Production
- Production locations: Goyang Gymnasium; Jungangro 1601, Ilsanseo-gu, Goyang, Gyeonggi-do
- Running time: 165 minutes

Original release
- Network: MBC
- Release: September 15, 2016

The 2016 Idol Star Athletics Rhythmic Gymnastics Futsal Archery Championships (Korean: 추석특집 2016 아이돌스타 육상 리듬체조 풋살 양궁 선수권대회) was held at Goyang Gymnasium in Goyang, South Korea on August 29 and was broadcast on MBC on September 15, 2016 at 17:15 (KST) for two episodes.

== Synopsis ==
The episode features male and female K-pop entertainers, which competes in various sports competitions. At the championships, a total number of 8 events (4 in athletics, 2 in archery, 1 in rhythmic gymnastics and 1 in futsal) were contested: 4 by men and 4 by women. There were around 200 K-pop singers and celebrities who participated, divided into 7 teams.

== Cast ==
=== Main ===
- Team A: Twice, Got7, Block B
- Team B: EXID, BTS, Hur Young-ji, Melody Day, Snuper
- Team C: Monsta X, VIXX, Chanmi (AOA), GFriend
- Team D: B1A4, Hello Venus, Beatwin, Lovelyz, Astro
- Team E: Apink, BtoB, Fiestar, Madtown, KNK
- Team F: Oh My Girl, Up10tion, MAP6, Cosmic Girls
- Team G: Mamamoo, Sonamoo, U-KISS, B.A.P, Brave Girls

== Results ==
=== Men ===
Athletics

Event	Gold	Silver	Bronze
60 m (24 players)	Team B Woosung (Snuper)	Team E Jota (Madtown)	Team G Jun (U-KISS)
4 × 100 m	Team B J-Hope (BTS); Jimin (BTS); Jungkook (BTS); Suga (BTS)	Team E Changsub (BtoB); Eunkwang (BtoB); Ilhoon (BtoB); Minhyuk (BtoB)	Team G Daehyun (B.A.P); Jongup (B.A.P); Yongguk (B.A.P); Youngjae (B.A.P)

Archery

Event	Gold	Silver	Bronze
Men's team	Team C I.M (Monsta X); Minhyuk (Monsta X); Shownu (Monsta X)	Team A Jay B (Got7); Jinyoung (Got7); Yugyeom (Got7)	Team B Jimin (BTS); Jungkook (BTS); Suga (BTS)

Futsal

Event	Gold	Silver	Bronze
Futsal	Real Mak-Dribble	Goaldae-Sliga	

=== Women ===
Athletics

Event	Gold	Silver	Bronze
60 m (24 players)	Team C Yuju (GFriend)	Team F Binnie (Oh My Girl)	Team F Eunseo (Cosmic Girls)
4 × 100 m	Team F Binnie (Oh My Girl); Hyojung (Oh My Girl); Jiho (Oh My Girl); YooA (Oh My Girl)	Team B Hani (EXID); Hyelin (EXID); Junghwa (EXID); Solji (EXID)	Team C Eunha (GFriend); SinB (GFriend); Yerin (singer) (GFriend); Yuju (GFriend)

Rhythmic gymnastics

Event	Gold	Silver	Bronze
Rhythmic gymnastics	Team F Cheng Xiao (Cosmic Girls)	Team E Cao Lu (Fiestar)	Team D Yein (Lovelyz)

Archery

Event	Gold	Silver	Bronze
Women's team	Team B Hyelin (EXID); Junghwa (EXID); Solji (EXID)	Team C Eunha (GFriend); Umji (GFriend); Yerin (singer) (GFriend)	Team D Baby Soul (Lovelyz); Jiae (Lovelyz); Jisoo (Lovelyz)

== Ratings ==
Episode #	Original broadcast date	TNmS Ratings		AGB Nielsen Ratings	
Episode #	Original broadcast date	Nationwide	Seoul National Capital Area	Nationwide	Seoul National Capital Area
1	September 15, 2016	7.9%	8.6%	7.0%	7.2%
2	September 15, 2016	10.7%	11.1%	8.9%	9.0%
