= Up & Down (EXID song) =

2014 single by EXID

Single by EXID

from the album Ah Yeah and Trouble
- Released: August 27, 2014 (Korean); August 22, 2018 (Japanese)
- Genre: K-pop; trip hop
- Length: 3:09
- Label: Yedang (Korean); Tokuma Japan (Japanese)
- Songwriters: Shinsadong Tiger; Beomi; LE; Nyangi
- Producers: Shinsadong Tiger; Beomi; LE; Nyangi

EXID singles chronology
"Every Night" (2012)	"Up & Down" (2014)	"Ah Yeah" (2015)

EXID singles chronology
"Lady" (2018)	"Up & Down" (2018)	"Trouble" (2019)

Alternative cover
- Japan Special Edition

"Up & Down" (Korean: 위아래; RR: Wiarae) is a song recorded by South Korean girl group EXID. It was released on August 27, 2014 by Yedang Company as a digital single, serving as the lead single for the group's second extended play Ah Yeah, which was released on April 13, 2015. Initially failing to chart, the song eventually became a commercial success in South Korea, peaking at number one on the Gaon Digital Chart 4 months after its initial release, and went on to sell more than 1.4 million digital units by the end of 2015.

A Japanese-language version of "Up & Down" was released in Japan on August 22, 2018 through Tokuma Japan. The song served as the group's debut in the country for their Japanese studio album, Trouble, which was released on April 7, 2019.

== Background and release ==
"Up & Down" was released in South Korea on August 27, 2014 through Yedang Company via digital download and streaming. In Japan, the song was released as a single album titled Up & Down Special Edition on August 22, 2018, as the group's debut Japanese single. The song was written and produced by Shinsadong Tiger, who had previously worked with a variety of groups such as T-ara, Beast and 4Minute, along with Beomi and members LE and Nyangi.

The song slowly gained popularity beginning in October 2014 after a fan-recorded video of member Hani performing the song went viral on South Korean social networking websites. As a result, the song eventually reached into the top 10 on the real-time charts and garnered newfound popularity for the group. Due to the success of the fancam—which has received over 30 million views on YouTube—EXID was once again invited to promote "Up & Down" in January 2015, despite the song's promotions ending months prior.

== Commercial performance ==
"Up & Down" was initially less successful, failing to chart following its initial release. Following the viral fancam in October 2014, the song made its debut onto Gaon Digital Chart on the week ending November 22, 2014, placing at number 34. In its second week, the song placed at number 7, and was followed by three consecutive weeks of charting at number 5. In the song's sixth week, "Up & Down" placed at number 3, and subsequently topped the chart in the week ending January 3, 2015, effectively becoming a commercial success.

The song sold a total of 525,183 digital units by the end of 2014, and ranked at number 77 on the year-end Gaon Digital Chart. The song maintained its popularity over the course of the following year, selling an additional 971,632 digital units by the end of 2015, and ranked at a high of number 28 on the year-end Gaon Digital Chart.

In Japan, "Up & Down" debuted at number 18 on the Oricon Singles Chart, and sold 7,710 copies. Its respective single album landed at number 15 on Oricon Singles Chart, and subsequently peaked at number 7 on its seventh day.

== Critical reception ==
"Up & Down" received generally positive reviews from music critics. Dazed ranked the song number 15 in their list of 20 Best K-Pop Songs of 2014, complimenting its musical production and catchiness. In their November 2019 list of "The 100 Greatest K-Pop Songs of the 2010s", Billboard magazine ranked the song at number 48, writing that the "trip-hop, trumpet-infused extravaganza was the perfect prelude to the new version of the quintet."

== Accolades ==
Music program wins for "Up & Down"
Program	Date	Ref.
M Countdown (Mnet)	January 8, 2015	
M Countdown (Mnet)	January 15, 2015	
Music Bank (KBS)	January 9, 2015	
Music Bank (KBS)	January 16, 2015	
Inkigayo (SBS)	January 11, 2015	
The Show (SBS M)	January 13, 2015	

== Track listing ==
Korean version
No.	Title	Lyrics	Music	Length
1.	"Up & Down" (위아래)	Shinsadong Tiger; Beomi; LE; Nyangi	Shinsadong Tiger; Beomi; LE; Nyangi	3:09
2.	"Up & Down" (Inst.)		Shinsadong Tiger; Beomi; Nyangi	3:09
Total length:				6:18

Japanese single album
No.	Title	Lyrics	Music	Length
1.	"Up & Down" (Japanese version)	Shinsadong Tiger; Beomi; LE; Nyangi	Shinsadong Tiger; Beomi; LE; Nyangi	3:13
2.	"Cream" (Japanese version)			3:16
3.	"Vaporize Yourself!"			3:31
4.	"Up & Down" (DJ moe remix)			3:15
Total length:				13:15

== Chart performance ==
=== Weekly charts ===
Chart (2015)	Peak position
South Korea (Gaon Digital Chart)	1

Chart (2018)	Peak position
Japan (Oricon Singles Chart)	18
Japan (Japan Hot 100)	41

=== Year-end charts ===
Chart (2014)	Position
South Korea (Gaon Digital Chart)	77
Chart (2015)	Position
South Korea (Gaon Digital Chart)	28

== Sales ==
Country	Sales
South Korea (digital)	1,496,815
Japan (Oricon)	9,213

== Release history ==
Region	Date	Format(s)	Label	Ref.
South Korea	August 27, 2014	Digital download; streaming	Yedang Company	
Japan	August 22, 2018	Digital download; streaming	Tokuma Japan	
