= B.L.E.S.S.E.D =

2020 studio album my EXID

- Digital and CD only edition

Studio album by EXID
- Released: August 19, 2020
- Genres: J-pop; R&B; deep house
- Length: 35:03
- Language: Japanese
- Label: Tokuma Japan Communications
- Producers: Shinsadong Tiger; LE; ☆Taku Takahashi; Nanako Ashida; Minami

EXID chronology
WE (2019)	B.L.E.S.S.E.D (2020)	X (2022)

Singles from B.L.E.S.S.E.D
- 1. "Bad Girl for You" Released: December 25, 2019; 2. "B.L.E.S.S.E.D" Released: August 19, 2020

B.L.E.S.S.E.D is the second Japanese studio album (third overall) by the South Korean girl group EXID. It was released on August 19, 2020, by Tokuma Japan Communications.

== Release ==
The album was released in three physical editions: Normal edition, First Press Limited Edition and CD+DVD edition, in addition to a digital album. All versions were released on August 19, 2020.

== Commercial performance ==
B.L.E.S.S.E.D debuted and peaked at number 16 on the Oricon Albums Chart for the week dated August 31, 2020. It debuted and peaked at number 28 on Billboard Japan's Hot Albums for the week dated August 31. It also debuted and peaked at number 13 on Billboard Japan's Top Albums Sales chart with 2,668 estimated copies sold.

== Track listing ==
Digital download/CD
No.	Title	Lyrics	Music	Length
1.	"B.L.E.S.S.E.D"	LE; Minami (Cream); Eigo	☆Taku Takahashi	3:14
2.	"I Love You" (JPN ver.)	Shinsadong Tiger; LE; Rina Moon	Shinsadong Tiger	3:18
3.	"L.I.E." (JPN ver.)	Shinsadong Tiger; LE; BeomxNang; Rina Moon	Shinsadong Tiger	3:31
4.	"Official"	LE; Minami (Cream); Eigo	Taku Takahashi	3:34
5.	"DDD" (JPN ver.)	Shinsadong Tiger; LE; V!VE; Rina Moon	Shinsadong Tiger	3:29
6.	"Night Rather Than Day" (JPN ver.)	Shinsadong Tiger; LE; KeeBomb; Rina Moon	Shinsadong Tiger	3:22
7.	"Bad Girl for You"	eill	Taku Takahashi	3:32
8.	"Ah Yeah" (JPN ver.)	Shinsadong Tiger; LE	Shinsadong Tiger	3:24
9.	"Cream" (JPN ver.)	LE	Shinsadong Tiger; LE	3:17
10.	"Break My Heart"	Nanako Ashida	Taku Takahashi; Nanako Ashida	4:22
Total length:				35:03

Digital download/Limited edition/Normal edition
No.	Title	Lyrics	Music	Length
11.	"B.L.E.S.S.E.D" (KR ver.)	Minami (Cream); Eigo; LE	Taku Takahashi; Minami (Cream)	3:15
Total length:				38:18

CD+DVD
No.	Title	Length
1.	"B.L.E.S.S.E.D" (music video)
2.	"Trouble" (EXID 2019 Summer Tour Live - Trouble -)
3.	"Cookie & Cream" (EXID 2019 Summer Tour Live - Trouble -)
4.	"Vaporize Yourself!" (EXID 2019 Summer Tour Live - Trouble -)
5.	"Memories" (EXID 2019 Summer Tour Live - Trouble -)

== Charts ==
Chart (2020)	Peak position
Japan Hot Albums (Billboard)	28
Japanese Albums (Oricon)	16
