= Street (EXID album) =

Studio album by EXID
- Released: June 1, 2016
- Recorded: 2016
- Genre: R&B; Deep house; Nu-disco
- Length: 43:35
- Language: Korean
- Label: Banana Culture; Sony Music

EXID chronology
Ah Yeah (2015)	Street (2016)	Eclipse (2017)

Singles from Street
- 1. "Hot Pink" Released: November 18, 2015; 2. "Only One" Released: March 10, 2016; 3. "L.I.E" Released: June 1, 2016; 4. "Cream" Released: December 31, 2016

Music video
- "Hot Pink" on YouTube "Only One" on YouTube "L.I.E" on YouTube

Street is the debut studio album by South Korean girl group EXID. The album was released digitally and physically on June 1, 2016. The album contains thirteen tracks with the lead single, "L.I.E".

The album was a commercial success peaking at number 2 on the Gaon Album Chart. The album has sold over 20,278 physical copies as of December 2016.

== Background and release ==
On April 19, 2016 BANANA Culture announced that EXID would have a comeback of first week in June with their first studio album. The album was named the third best K-pop album of 2016 by Billboard. The article noted, "The strongest girl-group output of 2016, EXID finally got the chance to show what they were capable of with a full-length album of offbeat-yet-trendy dance tracks that delivered on the promise they showed so early in the career. 'L.I.E' is an aggressive pop banger, but slick songs like "Cream," "Don't Want a Drive" and "No Way" rival it for best and most accessible song on the album."

== Promotion ==
EXID held a live showcase on June 1, 2016 and performed "L.I.E" and "Don't Want a Drive" on MBC's Show Champion.

== Commercial performance ==
Street entered and peaked at number 2 on the Gaon Album Chart on the chart issue dated May 29 - June 4, 2016. In its second week, the album charted at number 33. In its third week, the album saw a rise to number 29, after dropping the chart the following week.

The album entered at number 7 on the Gaon Album Chart for the month of June 2016, with 18,960 physical copies sold. The album also entered at number 100 on the chart for the year 2016, with 20,278 physical copies sold.

== Track listing ==
Street track listing
No.	Title	Lyrics	Music	Arrangement	Length
1.	"Don't Want a Drive" (데려다줄래; Will You Take Me)	LE	LE	Shinsadong Tiger	3:13
2.	"L.I.E" (엘라이)	Shinsadong Tiger, Namking Nang, LE	Shinsadong Tiger, Namking Nang, LE	Shinsadong Tiger	3:31
3.	"I Know" (알면서)	Namking Nang, LE	Namking Nang, LE		3:15
4.	"Hello" (Hani solo)	Monster Factory, EJAE	Monster Factory, EJAE, Made By, Park Yeong-hyeon	Made By	3:10
5.	"Cream"	LE	Shinsadong Tiger, LE	Shinsadong Tiger	3:13
6.	"3%" (Solji solo)	JQ, Makeumine Works	Polar Bear	Polar Bear	3:38
7.	"Only One"	LE	Shinsadong Tiger, Sleep Well	Shinsadong Tiger	3:53
8.	"Of Course" (당연해)	LE	Namking Nang, LE	Namking Nang	3:32
9.	"Are You Hungry" (냠냠쩝쩝; Jung Hwa & Hyerin)	Shinsadong Tiger	Shinsadong Tiger	Shinsadong Tiger	3:18
10.	"Like the Seasons" (여름, 가을, 겨울, 봄)	Monster Factory, Samuel Ku, LE	Monster Factory, Samuel Ku	Monster Factory	3:46
11.	"Good"	LE, IL	LE, IL	IL	3:24
12.	"Hot Pink" (Remix)	Shinsadong Tiger, Namking Nang, LE, Monster Factory	Shinsadong Tiger, Namking Nang, LE, Uppercut, LEONA	Namking Nang	2:55
13.	"L.I.E" (Jannabi Mix)	Shinsadong Tiger, Namking Nang, LE	Shinsadong Tiger, Namking Nang, LE	Shinsadong Tiger	2:57
Total length:					43:35

Bonus CD
No.	Title	Lyrics	Music	Length
1.	"Hot Pink"	Namking Nang, LE	Shinsadong Tiger	3:27

== Charts ==
Chart (2016)	Peak position
South Korean Weekly Albums (Gaon)	2
South Korean Monthly Albums (Gaon)	7
South Korea Year-End Albums (Gaon)	100
