= Trouble (EXID album) =

Studio album by EXID
- Released: April 3, 2019
- Genre: J-pop; trip hop
- Length: 39:43
- Label: Tokuma Japan Communications
- Producer: LE; Shinsadong Tiger; Singo Kubota; Satoru Kurihara; Taku Takahashi; Tak Miyazawa; Tsugutoshi Atohara; Justin Moretz; Kotaro Egami; Big Bread

EXID chronology
| Full Moon (2017) | Trouble (2019) | WE (2019) |

Singles from Trouble
- 1. "Up&Down" Released: August 22, 2018; 2. "Trouble" Released: January 23, 2019

Trouble is the debut Japanese studio album (second overall) by South Korean girl group EXID. It was released on April 3, 2019, by Tokuma Japan Communications.

== Release ==
The album was released in two physical editions, including a regular and a limited edition, and as a digital download on April 3, 2019.

== Commercial performance ==
Trouble debuted and peaked at number 12 on the Oricon Albums Chart and at number 23 on Billboard Japan's Hot Albums. It also peaked at number 10 on Billboard Japan's Top Albums Sales, with 4,831 physical copies sold in its first week.

== Track listing ==
Digital download / CD
| No. | Title | Lyrics | Music | Length |
|---|---|---|---|---|
| 1. | "The Beauty Is Guilty!?" | Satoru Kurihara | Singo Kubota; Satoru Kurihara; Taku Takahashi | 3:12 |
| 2. | "Hot Pink" (JPN ver.) | Rina Moon; Monster Factory; BEOMxNANG; Shinsadong Tiger; LE | | 3:24 |
| 3. | "Trouble" | Ryo Kurihara | | 4:05 |
| 4. | "Every Night" (JPN ver.) | LE; Rina Moon | LE; Shinsadong Tiger | 3:54 |
| 5. | "Without U" (JPN ver.) | LE | LE; S. Kim | 3:34 |
| 6. | "Cookie & Cream" | Rina Moon | Tak Miyazawa | 3:55 |
| 7. | "Up&Down" (JPN ver.) | Shinsadong Tiger; Beomi; LE; Nyangi | Shinsadong Tiger; Beomi; LE; Nyangi | 3:14 |
| 8. | "Too Good to Me" (JPN ver.) | LE; Big Bread | LE; Big Bread | 3:29 |
| 9. | "Vaporize Yourself !" | Junxix | Tsugutoshi Atohara | 3:33 |
| 10. | "Memories" | Sayaka Inoue | Justin Moretz; Kotaro Egami | 4:09 |
| Total length: | | | | 36:29 |

Trouble – Regular Edition
| No. | Title | Lyrics | Music | Length |
|---|---|---|---|---|
| 11. | "I Love You" | Shinsadong Tiger; LE | Shinsadong Tiger; LE | 3:14 |

Trouble – limited edition
| No. | Title | Length |
|---|---|---|
| 1. | "Trouble" (music video) |
| 2. | "Vaporize Yourself!" ("special" music video) |
| 3. | "Trouble" (music video making) |
| 4. | "Trouble" (making document) |

== Charts ==
| Chart (2019) | Peak position |
|---|---|
| Japan Hot Albums (Billboard) | 23 |
| Japanese Albums (Oricon) | 12 |
