= Park Jeong-hwa =

South Korean singer and actress (born 1995)

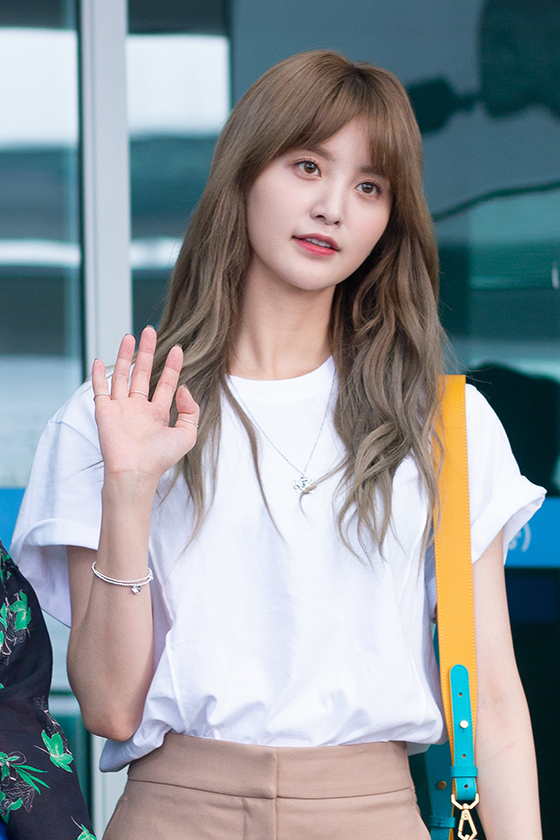
- Park in 2018
- Born: May 8, 1995 (age 31); Anyang, Gyeonggi, South Korea
- Occupations: Singer; actress
- Agent: J-Wide Company
- Musical career
- Genre: K-pop
- Instrument: Vocals
- Years active: 2012–present
- Label: Banana Culture
- Member of: EXID

Korean name
- Hangul: 박정화
- RR: Bak Jeonghwa
- MR: Pak Chŏnghwa

Signature
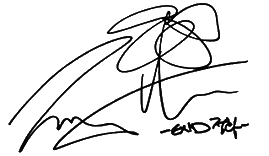

Park Jeong-hwa (Korean: 박정화; born May 8, 1995), also known mononymously as Jeonghwa, is a South Korean singer and actress. She is a member of the South Korean girl group EXID.

== Biography ==
Park Jeong-hwa was born on May 8, 1995, in Anyang, Gyeonggi, South Korea. She was a JYP Entertainment trainee before joining Yedang Entertainment.

== Career ==
=== EXID ===
Park made her musical debut as a member of EXID on February 15, 2012, with the release of their debut single, "Whoz That Girl".

=== Acting ===
Park made her acting debut as a child actress in a bit part in Wives on Strike (2004). In 2005, she became a co-host of NATV's Freshful Children Congress.

In 2015, she became a cast member in the variety television show Soulmates Returns. In the same year, she portrayed Yook Ah-young in the drama Webtoon Hero Toondra Show as her first major leading role. She also appeared in several music videos such as Wonder Girls' "Tell Me" (2007), Huh Gak and LE's "Whenever You Play That Song" (2011), I-Rex's "That You're My Girl" (2013), RK Kim Seong-hui's "10:10" and "You Are My Everything" (2014).

On October 9, 2018, it was confirmed that Park would be cast in web drama Member of Society, which aired in 2019.

On October 11, 2019, it was confirmed that Park signed on with J-Wide Company to pursue her acting career. In 2021, she appeared in an SBS hit drama One the Woman. She portrayed Park So-yi, a news anchor who is also mistress of Kang Mina's (portrayed by Lee Hanee) husband.

== Discography ==
=== Singles ===
Title	Year	Peak chart positions	Album
Title	Year	KOR	Album
"Alice"	2017	—	Full Moon
"A Gut Feeling"	2018	—	Non-album single
"Favorite"	2020	—	New Wave Vol.3 (Pinkmoon)
"Universe"	2020	—	New Wave Vol.4 (Pinkmoon)
"Home"	2019	—	Our Baseball Society OST
"—" denotes releases that did not chart or were not released in that region.

== Filmography ==
=== Film ===
Year	Title	Role	Ref.
2020	Dragon Inn Part 1: The City of Sadness	Ji Hye	
2021	Dragon Inn Part 2: The Night of the Gods	Ji Hye	
2024	Handsome Guys	Bora	
TBA	FEVER	Ha Young	

=== Television series ===
Year	Title	Role	Ref.
2004	Wives on Strike		
2021	One the Woman	Park So-yi	
2023–2024	Between Him and Her	Ryu Eun-jeong	

=== Web series ===
Year	Title	Role	Ref.
2015	Webtoon Hero Toondra Show	Yook Ah-young	
2017	Mask	Lee Chae-ri / Anita	
2018	If Love Was Not Timeless	Wing-sze	
2019	Member of Society	Sung Shi-eun	
2023	Mask Girl	Lee Ah-reum	

=== Television show ===
Year	Title	Role	Notes	Ref.
2005–2006	Freshful Children Congress	Host		
2015	Soulmates Returns	Cast		
2015	EXID's Showtime	Cast		
2017	The Show	MC		
2018	King of Mask Singer	Contestant	As "Cruise of Endorphins" (Episode 151)	
