= Elly (rapper) =

South Korean musician (born 1991)

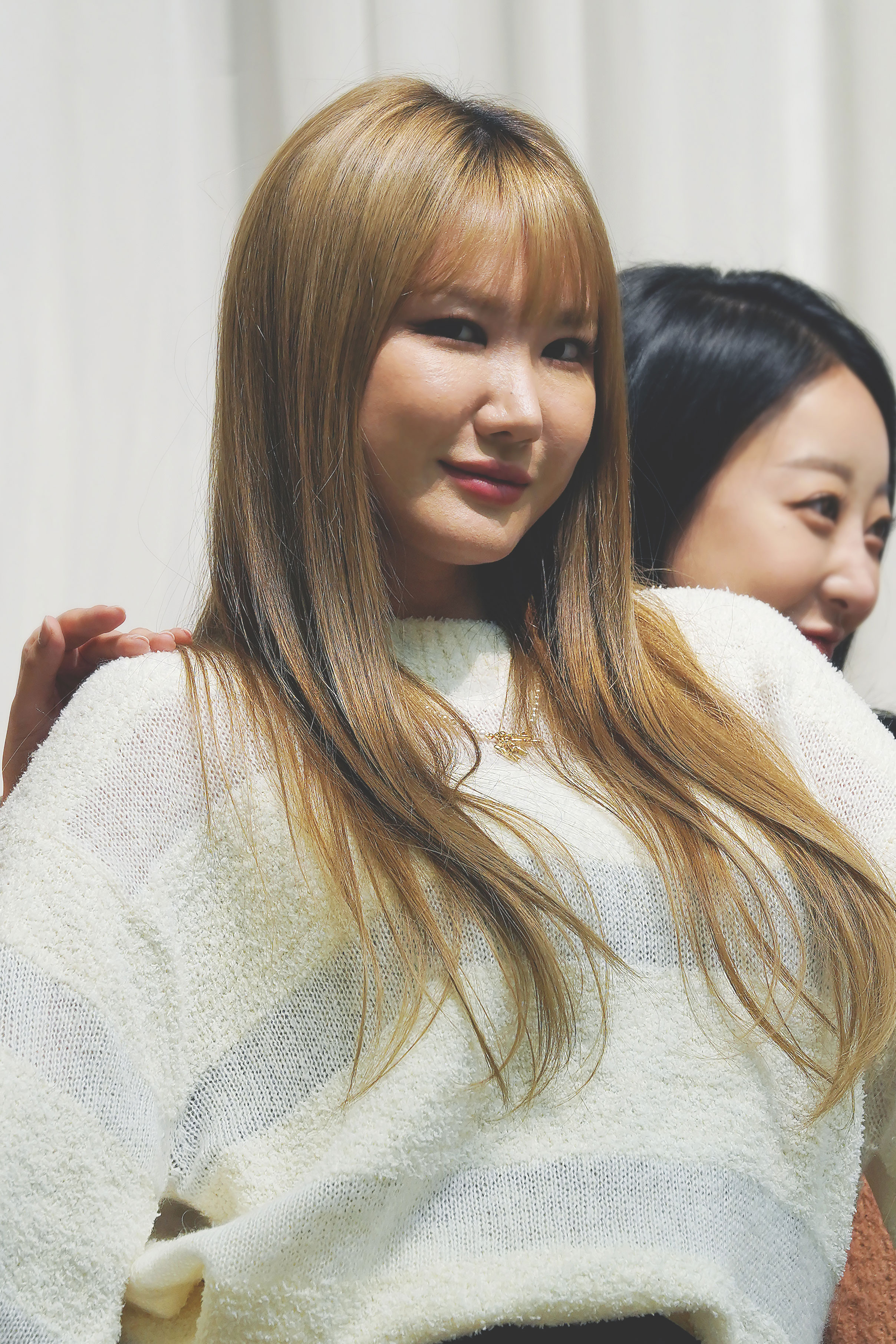
- Elly in October 2022
- Born: Ahn Hyo-jin; December 10, 1991 (age 34); Cheonan, South Korea
- Other name: LE
- Occupations: Rapper; singer; songwriter; producer
- Musical career
- Genres: K-pop; hip hop
- Instrument: Vocals
- Years active: 2012–present
- Labels: Banana Culture; TR
- Member of: EXID
- Formerly of: Jiggy Fellaz

Korean name
- Hangul: 안효진
- Hanja: 安孝珍
- RR: An Hyojin
- MR: An Hyojin

Signature
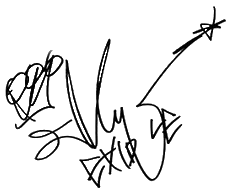

Ahn Hyo-jin (Korean: 안효진; born December 10, 1991), professionally known as Elly (/ˈɛli/; stylized in all caps) and formerly known as LE, is a South Korean rapper, singer and producer and songwriter. She has been a member of K-pop girl group EXID since 2012. She was also previously a member of the underground hip hop group, Jiggy Fellaz.

== Career ==
=== EXID ===
EXID officially debuted on February 16, 2012, with the release of their debut single, "Whoz That Girl".

=== Solo activities ===
In May 2012, Elly collaborated with Gavy NJ on their song, "Don't Call Me".

In February 2013, producer Brave Brothers revealed that Elly had collaborated with B2ST's Junhyung and Big Star's Feeldog in a project group and would be releasing a single on February 21, 2013. A teaser was released on February with a "19+" rating, which was previously acknowledged in the single cover, "19+ Profanity Included – Absurd", and on February 20, Brave Brothers released Elly's version of the "You Got Some Nerve" MV teaser. A "15+" version of the song was released on February 21, with the curse words in the song bleeped out. The original song was rated "19+", but representatives of Brave Brothers said "You Got Some Nerve" was scheduled to be released as is with a 19+ rating, but due to the interest and requests of the fans, they decided to beep out the profanity. The explicit version of the song and its music video was released on February 25, 2013. Some fans were angered by this, wondering "why attention was attracted by writing a 19+ rating on the poster," while a media outlet revealed that the song had never been sent to the TV networks to be reviewed and disappointment was expressed on Brave Brothers' attitude toward the situation due to "media play" and mocking fans.

In July 2014, Elly was featured in Hyuna's mini-album, A Talk, and helped write the lyrics for the songs "French Kiss" and "Blacklist" and was featured on the latter.

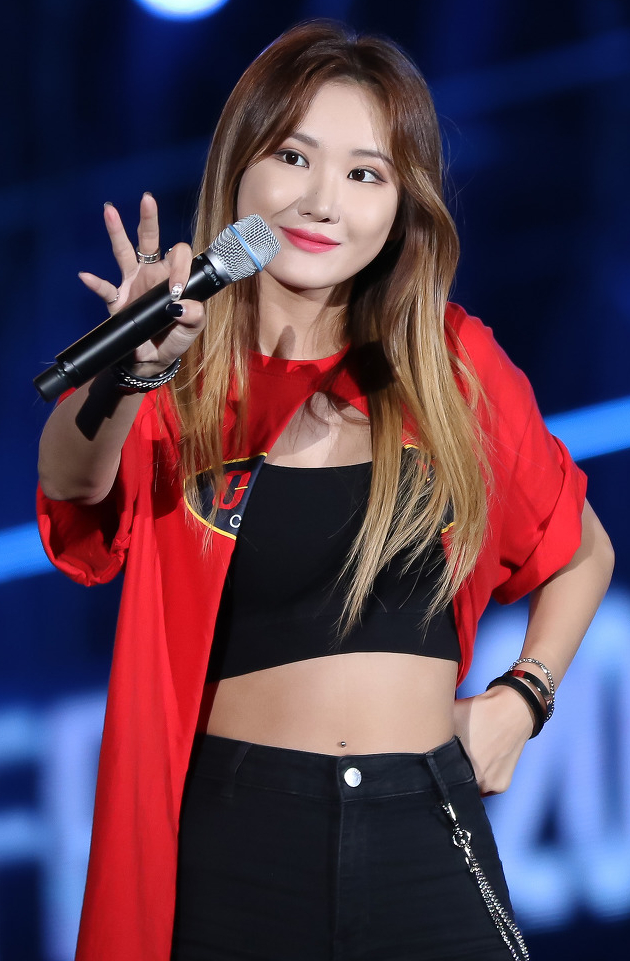
Elly performing in 2016

Elly helped co-produce the debut single album of girl group Tri.be alongside EXID producer and longtime collaborator Shinsadong Tiger.

On March 25, 2020, Elly left Banana Culture.

On February 2, 2021, Elly announced on her Twitter account that she has changed her professional name back to "Elly" after fans noticed that her writing credits on Tri.be's album, Tri.be Da Loca, featured her updated name. EXID's most recent single album, X, released in September 2022 for their 10th anniversary, also featured this updated name in promotions.

On April 17, 2023, Elly signed an exclusive contract with TR Entertainment.

== Discography ==
=== Singles ===
Title	Year	Peak chart positions	Sales	Album
Title	Year	KOR	Sales	Album
"Whenever You Play That Song" (그 노래를 틀때마다) (with Huh Gak)	2011	3	KOR: 1,977,782	Non-album singles
"You Got Some Nerve" (어이없네) (with Junhyung, Feeldog)	2013	13	KOR: 177,693	Non-album singles
"Our Night is More Beautiful Than Your Day" (우리의 밤은 당신의 낮보다 아름답다) (with Bomi, Namjoo, Chaeyeon, Seo In-young, Lee Seok-hoon, ₩uNo, Yang Da-il, Brother Su, Chancellor, Kang Min-hee)	2017	89	KOR: 28,346	Merry Summer
"JotThatDown" (with Jeonghwa, LuckSmith)	2026	TBA		Non-album single

==== As featured artist ====
Title	Year	Peak chart positions	Sales	Album
Title	Year	KOR	Sales	Album
"Don't Call Me" (연락하지마) (Gavy NJ feat. LE)	2012	17	KOR: 289,206	Non-album single
"The Song of Love" (사랑의 노래) (The SeeYa feat. LE)	2014	66	KOR: 24,724	Crazy Love
"잘가요 Mr.Kim" (Goodbye Mr. Kim) (ALi feat. LE)	2015	—		Non-album single
"Body 2 Body" (귀아래) (Verbal Jint and Sanchez feat. LE)	2015	71	KOR: 31,276	Yeoja
"Hold Over" (제껴) (Wheesung feat. LE)	2016	38	KOR: 46,206	Transformation
"Cover Girl" (Leo feat. LE)	2018	—		Canvas
"Racks" (PLUMA feat. LE)	2019	—		Non-album single
"Crocs Beats" (I-mean feat. ELLY)	2022	—		2022 Bring It Sing It
"Text You" (Babylon feat. ELLY)	2023	—		Colors
"Love To Everyone" (모두) (Kim Oki feat. ELLY)	2023	—		Non-album single
"—" denotes releases that did not chart.

=== Other charted songs ===
Title	Year	Peak chart positions	Sales	Album
Title	Year	KOR	Sales	Album
"Sweet Girl" (K.Will feat. LE)	2014	61	KOR: 37,608	One Fine Day
"Blacklist" (Hyuna feat. LE)	2014	70	KOR: 35,202	A Talk
"Shall We Dance With Dr. Lim" (임박사와 함께 춤을) (Im Chang-jung feat. LE, Epaksa)	2014	97	KOR: 22,561	Best Man

=== Songwriting credits ===
All song credits are adapted from the Korea Music Copyright Association's database unless stated otherwise.

List of songs, showing year released, artist name, and name of the album
Title	Year	Artist	Album	Lyricist	Composer
"Trouble Maker"	2011	Trouble Maker	Trouble Maker	Yes	No
"Whenever You Play That Song"	2011	Huh Gak and LE	Non-album single	Yes	No
"Whoz That Girl"	2012	EXID	Holla	Yes	No
"I Do"	2012	EXID	Holla	Yes	No
"Better Together"	2012	EXID	Hippity Hop	Yes	No
"I Feel Good"	2012	EXID	Hippity Hop	Yes	No
"Call"	2012	EXID	Hippity Hop	Yes	Yes
"Think About"	2012	EXID	Hippity Hop	Yes	No
"Whoz That Girl Part. 2"	2012	EXID	Hippity Hop	Yes	No
"Every Night"	2012	EXID	Non-album single	Yes	Yes
"Look At Me"	2012	Jewelry	Look At Me	Yes	No
"Talk That"	2012	Secret	Non-album single	Yes	No
"You Got Some Nerve"	2013	Feeldog, Junhyung, LE	Non-album single	Yes	No
"Now"	2013	Trouble Maker	Chemistry	Yes	No
"Hurt"	2014	Zia feat. LE	After 11 Days	Yes	No
"Sweet Girl"	2014	K.Will feat. LE	One Fine Day	Yes	No
"French Kiss"	2014	Hyuna	A Talk	Yes	No
"Black List"	2014	Hyuna feat. LE	A Talk	Yes	No
"Up & Down"	2014	EXID	Ah Yeah	Yes	Yes
"Round"	2014	Boys Republic	Real Talk	Yes	Yes
"The Song of Love"	2014	The SeeYa feat. LE	Crazy Love	Yes	No
"Goodbye Mr. Kim"	2015	ALi feat. LE	Non-album single	Yes	No
"You're Pitiful"	2015	Fiestar	Black Label	Yes	No
"Ah Yeah"	2015	EXID	Ah Yeah	Yes	Yes
"Thrilling"	2015	EXID	Ah Yeah	Yes	Yes
"Pat Pat"	2015	EXID	Ah Yeah	Yes	Yes
"With Out U"	2015	EXID	Ah Yeah	Yes	Yes
"1M"	2015	EXID	Ah Yeah	Yes	No
"Every Night (Ver. 2)"	2015	EXID	Ah Yeah	Yes	Yes
"Body 2 Body"	2015	Verbal Jint and Sanchez feat. LE	Yeoja	Yes	No
"Hot Pink"	2015	EXID	Non-album single	Yes	Yes
"My Friend's Boyfriend"	2015	DIA	Do It Amazing	Yes	No
"Only One"	2016	SoljiHani	Non-album single	Yes	No
"Don't Want a Drive/Will You Take Me"	2016	EXID	Street	Yes	Yes
"LIE"	2016	EXID	Street	Yes	Yes
"I Know"	2016	EXID	Street	Yes	Yes
"Cream"	2016	EXID	Street	Yes	Yes
"Only One"	2016	EXID	Street	Yes	No
"Of Course"	2016	EXID	Street	Yes	Yes
"Like The Seasons"	2016	EXID	Street	Yes	No
"Good"	2016	EXID	Street	Yes	Yes
"Hold Over"	2016	Wheesung feat. LE	Transformation	Yes	No
"What You Want"	2016	Cheetah, LE, Yezi, Choi Sung-joon, Cri De Joie	Tribe of Hip Hop 2 Episode 2	Yes	No
"Good"	2017	LE, Yezi, Jang Ki-yong	Tribe of Hip Hop 2 Semi Final 2	Yes	No
"Game of Thrones"	2017	Sse Sse Sse, Hot Chicks, Brand New, HI-LITE	Tribe of Hip Hop 2 FINAL I	Yes	No
"It's My Mind"	2017	LE, Yezi, NC.A	Tribe of Hip Hop 2 FINAL II	Yes	Yes
"Boy"	2017	EXID	Eclipse	Yes	Yes
"Night Rather Than Day"	2017	EXID	Eclipse	Yes	Yes
"How Why"	2017	EXID	Eclipse	Yes	Yes
"Velvet"	2017	LE	Eclipse	Yes	Yes
"DDD"	2017	EXID	Full Moon	Yes	Yes
"Too Good To Me"	2017	EXID	Full Moon	Yes	Yes
"Weeknd"	2017	LE and Hani	Full Moon	Yes	Yes
"Lady"	2018	EXID	Non-album single	Yes	Yes
"I Love You"	2018	EXID	Non-album single	Yes	Yes
"Cover Girl"	2018	LEO feat. LE	Canvas	Yes	No
"SWAN"	2019	7SENSES	SWAN	Yes	No
"Xie Xie REMIX"	2019	Bang Yongguk	BANGYONGGUK	Yes	No
"Racks"	2019	PLUME feat. LE	Non-album single	Yes	No
"Loca"	2021	Tri.be	Tri.be Da Loca	Yes	Yes
"Doom Doom Ta"	2021	Tri.be	Tri.be Da Loca	Yes	Yes
"Rub-A-Dum"	2021	Tri.be	Conmigo	Yes	Yes
"Loro"	2021	Tri.be	Conmigo	Yes	Yes
"Would Yun Run"	2021	Tri.be	Veni Vidi Vici	Yes	Yes
"Lobo"	2021	Tri.be	Veni Vidi Vici	Yes	Yes
"-18"	2021	Tri.be	Veni Vidi Vici	Yes	Yes
"True"	2021	Tri.be	Veni Vidi Vici	Yes	Yes
"Santa For You"	2021	Tri.be	Non-album single	Yes	Yes
"Kiss"	2022	Tri.be	Leviosa	Yes	No
"In The Air (777)"	2022	Tri.be	Leviosa	Yes	Yes
"Fire" (불이나)	2022	EXID	X	Yes	Yes
"IDK (I Don't Know)"	2022	EXID	X	Yes	Yes
"Leggo"	2022	EXID	X	Yes	No
"Fire (불이나) (Eng ver.)"	2022	EXID	X	No	Yes
"Let Me Dance"	2022	Everglow	The Spies Who Loved Me OST	Yes	No
"Crocs Beats"	2022	I-mean feat. ELLY	2022 Bring It Sing It	Yes	Yes
"We Are Young"	2023	Tri.Be	W.A.Y	Yes	Yes
"Wonderland"	2023	Tri.Be	W.A.Y	Yes	Yes
"Text You"	2023	Babylon feat. ELLY	Colors	Yes	No
"Love To Everyone" (모두)	2023	Kim Oki feat. ELLY	Non-album single	Yes	Yes
"Diamond"	2024	Tri.Be	Diamond	Yes	Yes

== Filmography ==
=== Variety shows ===
Year	Title	Notes
2016	Tribe of Hip Hop	Mentor
2017	EXID's Showtime	
