= Heo Sol-ji =

South Korean singer (born 1989)

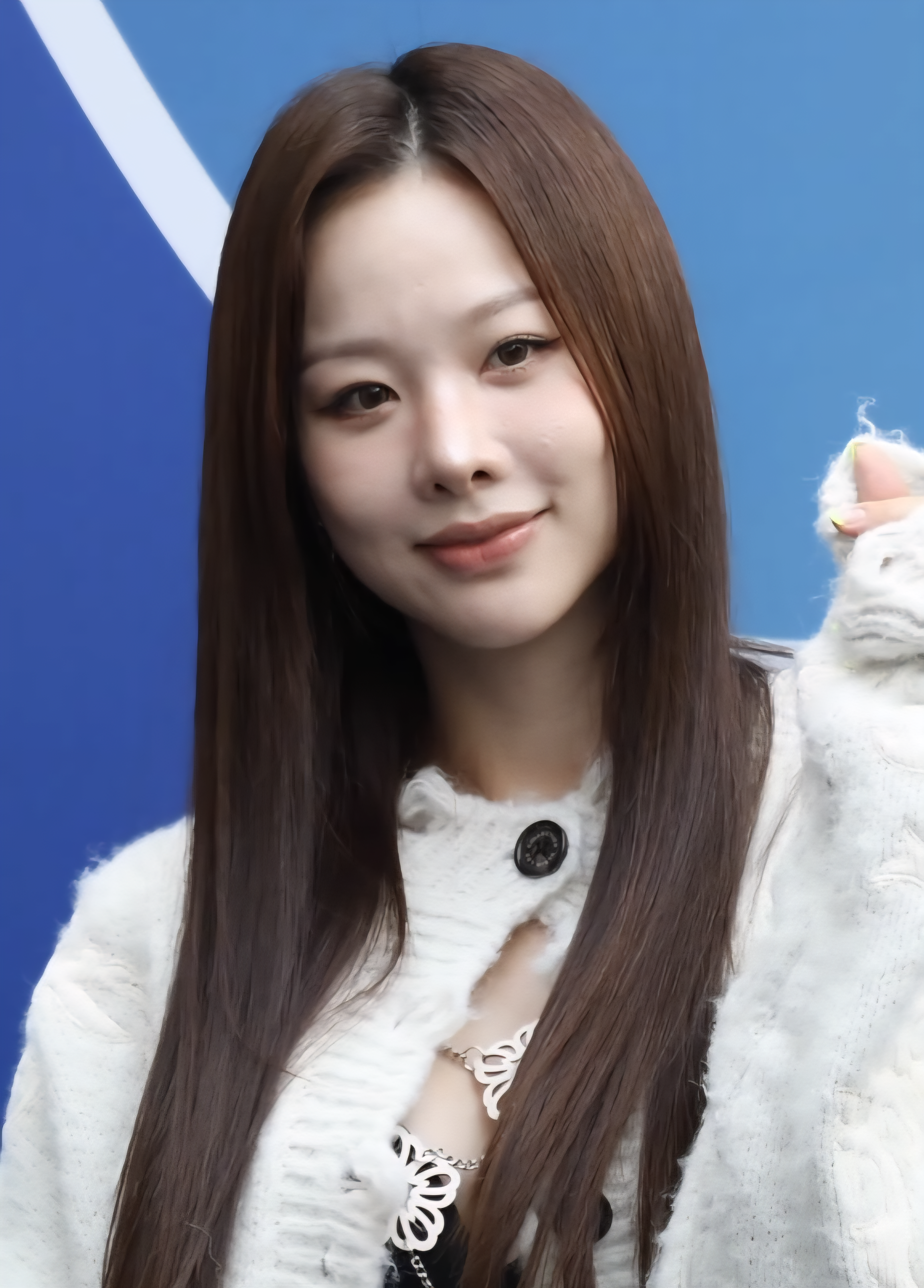
- Solji in September 2025
- Born: January 10, 1989 (age 37); Seoul, South Korea
- Education: Dong-ah Institute of Media and Arts
- Occupations: Singer; vocal trainer
- Musical career
- Genres: K-pop; trot
- Instruments: Vocals; piano
- Years active: 2006–present
- Labels: Banana Culture; C-JeS; MOM
- Member of: EXID; SoljiHani
- Formerly of: 2NB

Korean name
- Hangul: 허솔지
- Hanja: 許率智
- RR: Heo Solji
- MR: Hŏ Solchi

Signature
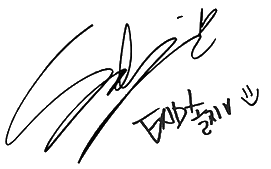

Heo Sol-ji (Korean: 허솔지; born January 10, 1989), known mononymously as Solji, is a South Korean singer. She was a member of the ballad duo group 2NB from 2006 to 2010. She later became a vocal trainer before joining EXID in July 2012 as the leader and main vocalist.

== Career ==
Solji was formerly a member of the vocal duo 2NB with Blady's Gabin, and released solo singles in 2008. The duo disbanded in 2012. She then worked as EXID's vocal trainer before becoming a member. In April 2012, AB Entertainment announced that three original members Yuji, Dami, and Haeryeong would leave the girl group EXID. Solji then joined EXID along with Hyelin, a former Superstar K3 participant.

In February 2013, EXID formed a sub-unit called "Dasoni", which consisted of Solji and Hani. The sub-unit released their debut single "Goodbye" on February 15, 2013, which also included the song "Said So Often".

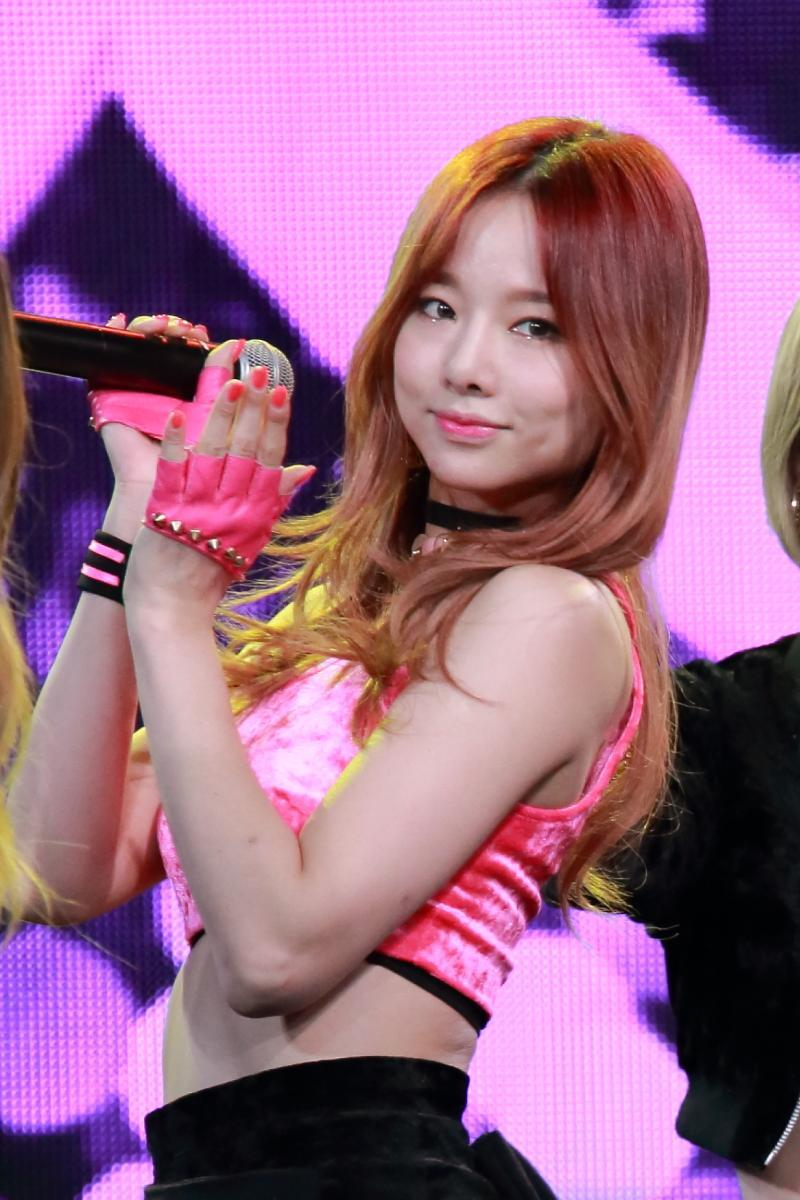
Solji performing in 2015

In February 2015, Solji participated in a singing competition program, MBC's King of Mask Singer, for their pilot episode, in which she won the title. She appeared as Self-Luminous Mosaic and defeated singer and comedian, Shin Bora, and trot singer, Hong Jin-young, and became the first winner of the show, impressing the panel of judges as well as viewers. This drew a lot of attention to EXID and boosted Solji's reputation as a talented vocalist.

On February 8, 2016, Solji, as well as fellow vocal trainer and friend, Doo Jin-Soo, were invited to join MBC's Duet Song Festival for the pilot episode of their Lunar New Year Special. They went up against Block B's rapper Zico and his partner, Lee So-young. Solji and her partner emotionally sang Lee Seung-cheol's "The Sky in the West (서쪽하늘)". In the end, Solji and Doo Jin-soo won with a score of 477, which is still the highest score in the episode, and impressed the judges and the viewers yet again. On April 8, 2016, Solji and her partner were invited back to compete in MBC's Duet Song Festival for their first episode. They were the last performers to sing in the episode thus competing with f(x)'s Luna and Goo Hyun-mo. Solji sang Davichi's "8282". In the end, Solji won again with a score of 439 and thus further increasing EXID's popularity and her reputation as a singer.

On December 21, 2016, Solji was diagnosed with hyperthyroidism, putting her career on hold, while the other four members of EXID continued their schedules in the year-end awards season. She made a surprise appearance in EXID's Asia Tour in Seoul on August 13, 2017, but she was still not medically cleared to return to group activities. She, however, participated in recording for the group's fourth mini-album, Full Moon, despite not being involved in its promotion and live performances. She also stayed active as a Radio DJ. On July 4, 2018, Solji revealed that her condition has stabilized enough to prepare for her return for EXID's next comeback. On July 27, it was confirmed by the agency that she would be back for EXID's Japanese debut.

On July 22 and 29, 2018, Solji returned as a contestant in episode 163–164 of MBC's singing competition program King of Mask Singer as 'Dongmakgol Girl' and emerged victorious, being crowned the 82nd generation of 'Mask King'.Solji continued to successfully defend herself over all contestants in the next 8 episodes since her initial victory in King of Mask Singer, before ending her streak as the winner of 82nd to 86th generation on October 21. After her defeat, she revealed her identity, and explained her choice of return through the show as it was where she rose to fame.

On February 5, 2020, Solji left Banana Culture although she remains as a member of EXID in the future activities.

On March 23, 2020, Solji signed with C-JeS Entertainment to pursue her solo career.

In 2022, Solji made a comeback with her first mini album First Letter on February 25. On November 21, 2022, Solji released a single album, The days we were us.

In May 2026, Solji signed contract with MOM Entertainment.On September 15, Solji release special single album "Over The Limit" with contain of three-track, including the double lead single "Over The Limit" and "The Only One". It also marked her first Trot releases.

== Personal life ==
Solji majored in Applied Music at Dong-ah Institute of Media and Arts. In December 2016, she was diagnosed with hyperthyroidism and went on hiatus from EXID's group activities until July 2018. She enrolled in Kyung Hee Cyber University's practical music program during her hiatus.

In October 2021, Solji was appointed as a professor in the Department of Applied Music at Yongin University.

== Discography ==
=== Extended plays ===
Title	Album details	Track listing
First Letter	Released: February 25, 2022; Label: C-Jes Entertainment; Formats: CD, digital download	1. Fade Away (계절의 끝에서); 2. Pillow; 3. Breaking Up (이렇게 헤어지고 있어); 4. Have a Good Day; 5. Fade Away (계절의 끝에서) (Inst.); 6. Breaking Up (이렇게 헤어지고 있어) (Inst.)

=== Single albums ===
Title	Album details	Track listing
Challenge	Released: January 15, 2008; Label: Friday Entertainment; Format: Digital download	1. The Day I Loved You (사랑했던 날); 2. Out of Hatred (미워서) (feat. Suho); 3. Smile (미소); 4. Don't (말아요)
At Jongno	Remake Album; Released: May 22, 2008; Label: Friday Entertainment; Formats: CD, digital download	1. 종로에서 (feat. PK헤만); 2. 내게 남은 사랑을 드릴께요; 3. 조금만 사랑했다면; 4. 종로에서 (Inst.); 5. 종로에서 (Chinese ver.)
As the First Feeling (Remake Pt.2)	Released: July 22, 2008; Label: Friday Entertainment; Format: Digital download	1. 처음 그 느낌처럼; 2. 종로에서 (feat. PK헤만); 3. 내게 남은 사랑을 드릴께요; 4. 조금만 사랑했다면; 5. 처음 그 느낌처럼 (Remix)
Rains Again	Released: July 9, 2020; Label: C-JeS Entertainment; Format: Digital download	1. Rains Again (오늘따라 비가와서 그런가 반); 2. Rains Again (오늘따라 비가와서 그런가 반) (Inst.)
Waste of Emotions	Released: October 9, 2021; Label: C-JeS Entertainment; Format: Digital download	1. Waste of Emotions (감정 낭비); 2. Waste of Emotions (감정 낭비) (Inst.)
The days we were us	Released: November 21, 2022; Label: C-JeS Entertainment; Format: Digital download	1. The days we were us (우리가 우리였었던 날들); 2. The days we were us (우리가 우리였었던 날들) (Inst.)
Rock Rock Party Part.3	Released: August 31, 2023; Label: Dreamus, FreeCONG; Format: Digital download	1. So far away (안녕 내가 싫어도); 2. So far away (안녕 내가 싫어도) (Inst.)
One Ring	Remake Album; Released: December 9, 2023; Label: Xanadu Entertainment, Glim Entertainment; Formats: Digital download	1. One ring (반지하나); 2. One ring (반지하나) (Inst.)
Western Sky	Remake Album; Released: April 18, 2024; Label: Jejaripyo Project, Jaywin Entertainment; Formats: Digital download	1. Western Sky (서쪽하늘); 2. Western Sky (Inst.) (서쪽하늘) (Inst.)
La Festa	Released: January 31, 2025; Label: Fox Creative; Formats: Digital download	1. La Festa (라페스타); 2. La Festa (Inst.) (라페스타) (Inst.)
If you're gonna hurt me like this	Released: March 15, 2025; Label: All That Music Co., Ltd.; Formats: Digital download	1. If you're gonna hurt me like this (입버릇); 2. If you're gonna hurt me like this(Inst.) (입버릇) (Inst.)

=== Singles ===
Year	Song title	Notes
2008	"The Day I Loved" (사랑했던 날)	
2008	"Love Shake"	Soundtrack of LOVE & LAW
2009	"If You Want to Give Up" (포기하고 싶을 때)	with Sin-gun
2009	"Goodbye, My Lover" (잘가요 내사랑)	with Hye-sung
2009	"First Love"	with Ah-in and Back Attack
2010	"You are Away from Me" (내 곁에 없는 그대)	Soundtrack of Wife Returns
2011	"Be with You"	with PK Heman
2011	"Last Tango"	with Heo In-chang and PK Heman
2012	"Unromantic"	with PK Heman and Kim Hyun-joo
2015	"Don't Touch Me" (손대지마)	Cover of Ailee with Shin Bo-ra on King of Mask Singer's pilot episode
2015	"The Reason I Became a Singer" (가수가 된 이유)	Cover of Shin Yong-jae on King of Mask Singer Pilot Episode
2015	"We Should've Been Friends" (친구라도 될 걸 그랬어)	Cover of Gummy on King of Mask Singer Pilot Episode
2015	"Maria" (Korean version)	Cover of Kim Ah-joong on King of Mask Singer Episode 1
2015	"Love Sweet"	Soundtrack of The Producers
2015	"Shouldn't Have Treated You Well" (잘해주지 말걸 그랬어)	with Welldone Potato
2015	"One Dream One Korea" (새시대 통일의 노래)	One Korea Global Campaign to raise awareness and unify Korea
2015	"Today" (오늘은)	with Hwan Jae-hwan and Jung Hyung-don
2016	"You And I" (너랑나랑)	Soundtrack of Sweet Stranger and Me
2016	"8282"	Cover of Davichi with Doo Jin-soo on Duet Song Festival (Ep. 1)
2016	"Love Is Like Rain Outside My Window" (사랑은 창밖에 빗물 같아요)	Cover of Lee Yeong-hyeon on Immortal Songs: Singing the Legend
2017	"Leaning On The Wind" (바람에 기대)	Soundtrack of Witch at Court
2017	"Flame"	Soundtrack of Money Flower with Hani
2018	"Is There Anybody?" (누구 없소)	Cover of Han Young-ae with Park Kyung-lim on King of Mask Singer (Ep. 163)
2018	"Can't Do" (못해)	Cover of 4Men ft. Mi (美) on King of Mask Singer Episode 164
2018	"Father" (아버지)	Cover of Insooni on King of Mask Singer Episode 166
2018	"How Are You" (어떤가요)	Cover of Lee Jeong-bong on King of Mask Singer Episode 168
2018	"I Will Show You" (보여줄게)	Cover of Ailee on King of Mask Singer Episode 170
2018	"Please" (제발)	Cover of Lee So-ra on King of Mask Singer Episode 172
2018	"Confession" (고백)	Cover of Jung Joon-il on King of Mask Singer Episode 174
2018	"In This Place"	Soundtrack of Ralph Breaks the Internet
2019	"Within Your Reach" (손 닿을 만큼)	Soundtrack of Perfume
2019	"I Miss You" (보고 싶다)	Cover of Kim Bum-soo on Immortal Songs: Singing the Legend
2019	"Nocturne" (녹턴)	Cover of Lee Eun-mi on Immortal Songs: Singing the Legend
2019	"Night After Night" (밤이면 밤마다)	Cover of Insooni on Immortal Songs: Singing the Legend
2019	"Even a Bitter Wound May Hurt" (쓰라린 상처도 아픈지 모르고)	Soundtrack of Love with Flaws
2020	"Falling Star" (별이 진다네)	Cover of Travel Sketches on Two Yoo Project Sugar Man 3 Episode 06
2020	"Walking On This Street" (이 거리를 걸어서)	Soundtrack of Forest
2020	"One Day" (하루)	Soundtrack of Find Me in Your Memory
2020	"Sangnoksu 2020" (상록수 2020)	Remake song dedicated to medical staff around the world who are fighting Corona 19 beyond Korea, sung by 34 Korean artists, released at 60th anniversary of the "April 19 Revolution",
2020	"Breathe" (한숨)	Cover of Lee Hi with IRO on Immortal Songs: Singing the Legend (Summer Special Vol. 1 - Friends Special)
2020	"Heavenly Reunion" (천상재회)	Cover of Choi Jin-hui on Romantic Call Centre
2020	"You Like Me, I Like You" (너 나 좋아해, 나 너 좋아해)	Cover of Hyeoni & Deoki, with Jang Minho on Romantic Call Centre
2020	"One Person" (한사람)	Soundtrack of 18 Again
2020	"MAMF on my mind"	Cultural Diversity Festival MAMF 2020 theme song
2020	"The Trace You Left" (네가 남긴 흔적)	Soundtrack of The Spies Who Loved Me
2021	"Remember my love" (기억해줘요 이런 내 마음을)	Soundtrack of "Bunny and Guys" webtoon
2021	"Will You Come Slowly" (천천히 와줄래)	Third song of Play Life Project in support of youth with depression
2021	"If It's Fate" (운명이라면)	Soundtrack of "Scripting Your Destiny"
2021	"This Comfort" (이런 위로)	Soundtrack of "Mad for Each Other"
2021	"Still Parting From Us" (느린 이별)	Soundtrack of "The Listen: Wind Blows", as part of "The Listen", along with Kim Nayoung, Kassy, Seunghee, HYNN
2021	"That's the Reason that Hurt Me" (그이유가 내겐 아픔이었네)	Cover of Yoo Hyun-sang on Immortal Songs: Singing the Legend (Artist Yoo Hyun-sang)
2022	"Youth" (청춘)	Cover of Kim Chang-wan on Immortal Songs: Singing the Legend (Artist Kim Chang-wan Part1)
2022	"Loadstar"	With 2F, soundtrack of Elsword game, Luciel theme song
2022	"The Blue in You" (그대안의 블루)	Soundtrack of DNA Singer - Fantastic Family Round 2&3, with Heo Ju Seung
2022	"Just The Way We Love" (우리 사랑 이대로)	Soundtrack of DNA Singer - Fantastic Family Round 2&3, with Heo Ju Seung
2022	"Oblivion" (망각)	Soundtrack of New Festa EPISODE.3, remake of Jeon Eun-jin debut song, with Yoonsang
2022	"Fight" (여수)	Korea Tourism Organization campaign album Feel the Rhythm of Korea (2022), with Lee Hyun
2022	"By Your Side" (사랑스런 너의 곁에)	Soundtrack of Poong, the Joseon Psychiatrist
2022	"It's all the same" (거기서 거기)	'Second' after the project breakup
2022	"I believed it was love" (사랑이라고 믿었다)	ODR PROJECT PART.3
2022	"Knight (Knight for Fight)"	Soundtrack of Tales Runner (Multiverse and Dimension Authority) game
2023	"Miracles" (기적과 같은 일)	Soundtrack of Nine Number of Us webtoon
2023	"The pain of love" (그 아픔까지 사랑한거야)	Cover of Jo Jeong-hyeon on Monthly the Stage
2023	"Something Like That" (그런 일은)	Performed on Into My Playlist
2024	"Uphill Road" (오르막길)	Cover of Choi Jung-in on Immortal Songs: Singing the Legend (Artist Yoon Jong-shin)
2024	"Night Road in Hannam-dong" (한남동 밤길)	
2026	"Can't I Love You Again?" (다시 사랑하면 안되니})	Soundtrack of Love on the Menu

== Filmography ==
=== Television shows ===
Year	Title	Role	Notes	Ref.
2015	King of Mask Singer	Contestant	as "Self-Luminous Mosaic"	
2015	EXID's Showtime	Cast Member	with EXID members	
2016	Battle Trip	Contestant	with Hani (Episode 2–3)	
2018	Under Nineteen	Judge/Mentor/Vocal director		
2018	King of Mask Singer	Contestant	as "Dongmakgol Girl"	
2019	Love Me Actually	Special MC	Episodes 9, 10 & 11	
2021	Shutdown Fairy	Cast member		
2021	The Listen: Wind Blows	Cast member		
2023	Boys Planet	Vocal master		

=== Radio shows ===
Year	Title	Role	Notes	Ref.
2022	Noon's Hope Song, Kim Shin-young	Special DJ	November 16–20	

=== Theatre ===
Year	Show	Role	Ref.
2023	SIX the Musical	Katherine Howard	
2024	The Hero Musical	Seol-hee	
2025-2026	Rent Musical	Mimi	
