= EXID's Showtime =

South Korean documentary

- Genre: Reality
- Created by: MBC Plus Media
- Developed by: MBC Plus.
- Presented by: MBC Every 1
- Starring: EXID
- Country of origin: South Korea
- Original language: Korean
- No. of episodes: 8

Production
- Production location: South Korea
- Camera setup: Multi-camera
- Running time: approx. 50 minutes
- Production company: Wellmade Yedang

Original release
- Release: July 9 – August 27, 2015

EXID's Showtime is a South Korean documentary starring the popular girl group EXID. It is the fifth season of the South Korean reality show series, Showtime.

== Background ==
EXID's Showtime is a reality TV show that allows the fans to see behind-the-scenes of EXID's daily lives.

No.	Title	Original release date	U.S. viewers (millions)
1	"Episode 1"	July 9, 2015	0.806%
EXID went to the amusement park.
2	"Episode 2"	July 16, 2015	0.6%
Each member has a reunion with their family members.
3	"Episode 3"	July 23, 2015	N/A
EXID go through 3 rounds of competition to determine the most competitive member in each area. Hani in fashion, LE in arcade games, Solji in karaoke scores, where she got perfect score for Tears by So Chan Wee, known for its high notes.
4	"Episode 4"	July 30, 2015	N/A
EXID's members were asked what kind of variety they wanted to do. They tricked each other to win the game in their version of Infinite Challenge.
5	"Episode 5"	August 6, 2015	N/A
After finishing breakfast, EXID went to play billiards. Solji and Hani won the game. They later went to the spa resort and enjoyed their day, and finished with a dinner in Chongnam Dong.
6	"Episode 6"	August 13, 2015	N/A
Each member did their own live broadcast through VLive app.
7	"Episode 7"	August 20, 2015	0.5%
EXID went to Jeju Islands as their memory trips. They went there three years ago. They played games to decide who will go into the ocean.
8	"Episode 8"	August 27, 2015	N/A
Part 2. They performed Up and Down on a yacht, had BBQ in a hostel, then celebrated their win in music charts
