= I Love You (EXID song) =

Single by EXID
- Released: November 21, 2018
- Genre: K-pop
- Length: 3:14
- Label: Banana Culture; Sony Music
- Songwriter(s): Shinsadong Tiger; LE
- Producer(s): Shinsadong Tiger; LE

EXID singles chronology
"Better Together (Remastered 2018)" (2018)	"I Love You" (2018)	"Trouble" (2019)

"I Love You" (Korean: 알러뷰) is a song recorded by South Korean girl group EXID. It was released as a single on November 21, 2018, by Banana Culture and distributed by Sony Music. A music video for the song was also released on November 21. This marks the return of member Solji after a hiatus from the group due to health issues.

== Release ==
The song was released as a digital single on November 21, 2018, through several music portals, including MelOn and iTunes. A CD single was released a day later in South Korea.

== Composition ==
The song is written and produced by Shinsadong Tiger and member LE.

== Commercial performance ==
"I Love You" debuted at number 61 on the Gaon Digital Chart and at number 7 on the Gaon Album Chart, for the week ending November 24, 2018. It also debuted at number 65 on Billboard Korea's Kpop Hot 100 for the week of November 25. In its second week, the song peaked at number 29 on Gaon and at number 21 on the Hot 100.

The song also entered Billboard's World Digital Songs Sales chart at number 5, earning the group's first Top 5 on the chart, with 1,000 downloads sold in the week ending November 22.

The physical copy of the single was the 25th best-selling album of November 2018, with 14,777 copies sold.

== Track listing ==
Digital download / CD
No.	Title	Lyrics	Music	Arrangement	Length
1.	"I Love You" (알러뷰)	Shinsadong Tiger; LE	Shinsadong Tiger; LE	Shinsadong Tiger	3:14
2.	"I Love You" (Inst.)		Shinsadong Tiger; LE	Shinsadong Tiger	3:14
Total length:					6:28

== Charts ==
Chart (2018)	Peak position
New Zealand Hot Singles (RMNZ)	34
South Korea (Gaon Digital)	29
South Korea (Gaon Social)	2
South Korea (Gaon Album)	7
South Korea (Billboard)	21
US World Digital Songs	5
