= EXID =

South Korean girl group

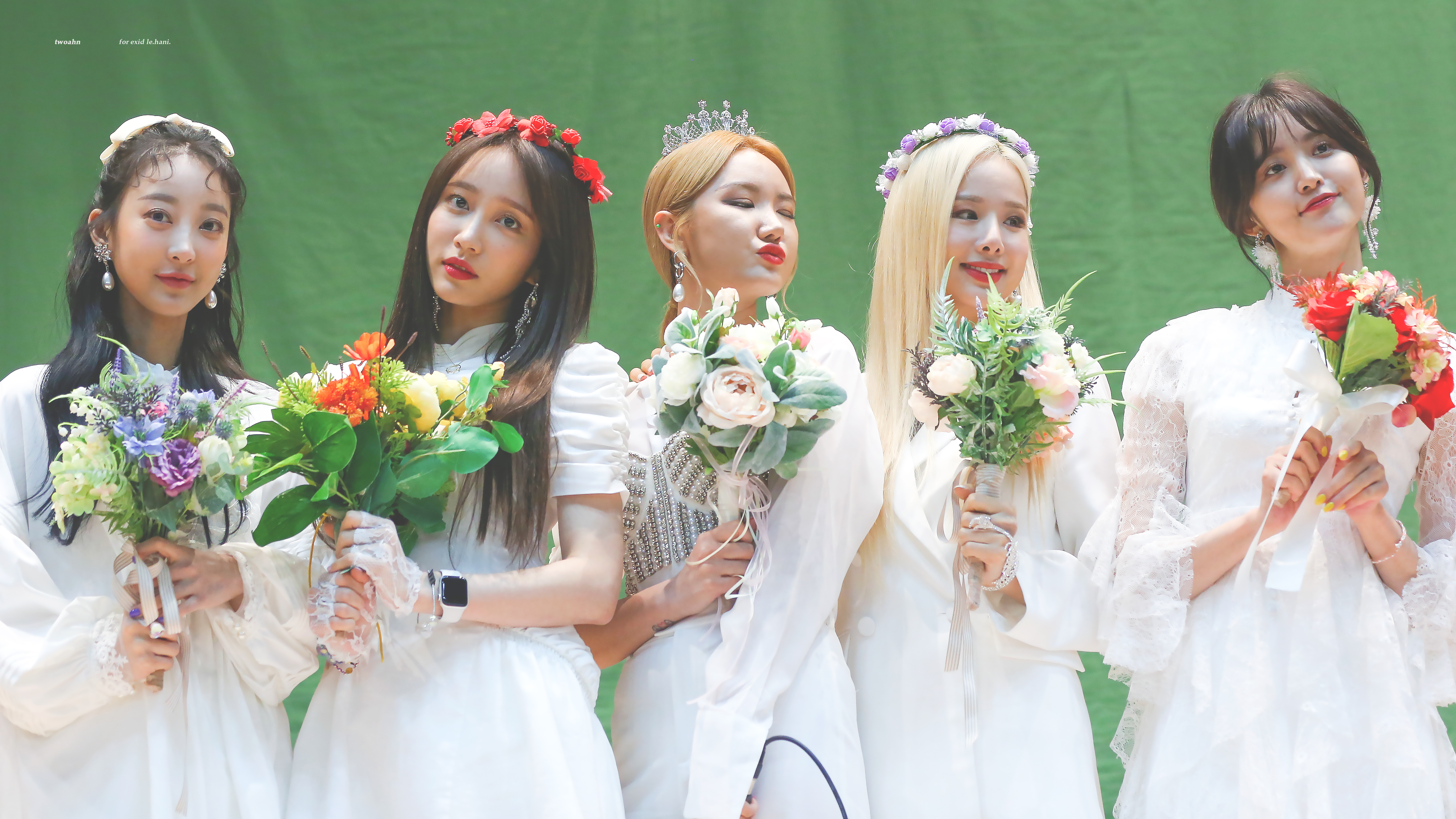
- EXID in 2019. From left to right: Hyelin, Hani, Elly, Solji, and Jeonghwa.

Background information
- Origin: Seoul, South Korea
- Genres: K-pop; trip hop; R&B; deep house; nu-disco
- Years active: 2012–2020; 2022–present
- Labels: AB Entertainment; Banana Culture; Tokuma Japan; Sony Music Korea
- Spinoffs: SoljiHani; MaeJjeop
- Members: Solji; Elly; Hani; Hyelin; Jeonghwa
- Past members: Dami; Yuji; Haeryung

EXID (/iː ˈɛks aɪ ˈdiː/; Korean: 이엑스아이디; initialism for "Exceed in Dreaming") is a South Korean girl group formed in 2012. The group consists of five members: Solji, Elly, Hani, Hyelin, and Jeonghwa. EXID debuted in February 2012, with the single "Whoz That Girl". Though the album gained some attention, it was not until 2014 that the group unexpectedly gained popularity with the single "Up & Down", which reached number one on the Gaon Singles Chart four months after release due to a fan-recording of a live performance becoming a viral video.

EXID released their second EP Ah Yeah in April 2015, to commercial success, and followed this with their first studio album Street (2016) and various other EPs over the years. In May 2019, EXID announced its indefinite hiatus for Korean group activities due to various members leaving their agency Banana Culture, but remained active in their Japanese releases such as their studio albums Trouble (2019) and B.L.E.S.S.E.D (2020). EXID returned two years later with their first independent album X (2022) to commemorate their tenth anniversary.

== History ==
=== 2011–2013: Formation and debut, line-up changes and Dasoni unit ===
In May 2011, producer Shinsadong Tiger and AB Entertainment scouted several trainees from JYP Entertainment to form a new girl group. Trainee Yuji was the first to join the JYP girl group but failed to debut. Yuji contacted the trainees Hani, Haeryung, and Jeonghwa to audition for AB, and all three were subsequently accepted into the agency. The group added a fifth member when Shinsadong Tiger discovered Elly, an underground rapper and songwriter. Dami, who was already an AB trainee, was the sixth and last member added to the group. Originally named "WT", an acronym for "Who's That", the group changed their name to EXID a few months before their debut. In December 2011, Elly was featured in Huh Gak's single "Whenever You Play That Song", which appeared on Korean music charts. EXID was scheduled to debut in January 2012, but their debut was delayed to February when Elly sustained a leg injury during rehearsals. On February 3, AB Entertainment announced that EXID would debut with the single "Whoz That Girl". Video teasers featuring the members doing solo performances were subsequently released online.

EXID released their first single "Whoz That Girl" from the digital single album Holla, on February 16, 2012. They made their debut performance on M Countdown, and then performed on Music Core and Inkigayo. Their debut song "Whoz That Girl" peaked at number 36 on the Gaon Singles Chart and ultimately sold 840,000 digital copies.

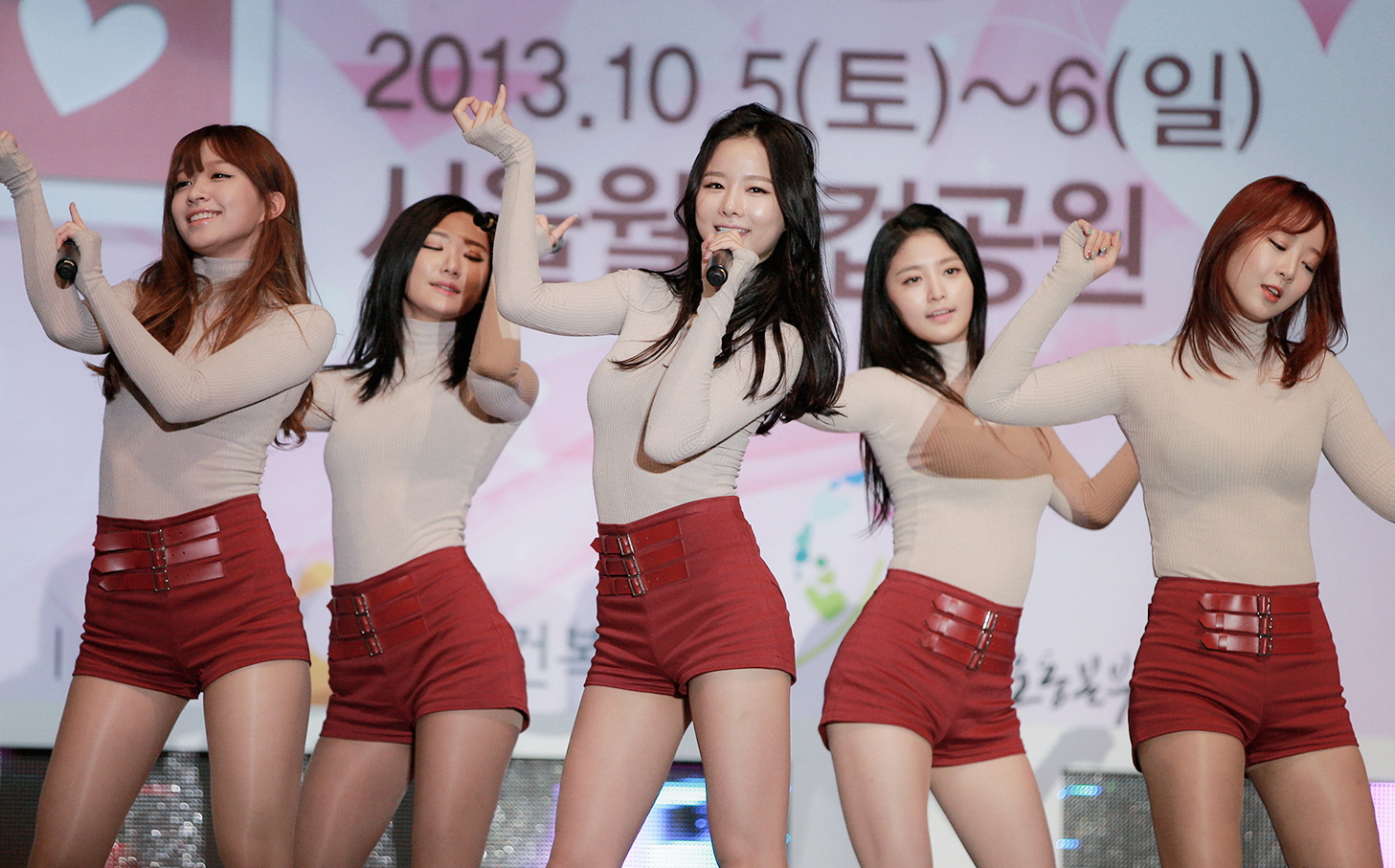
EXID in October 2013.

In April 2012, AB Entertainment officially announced members Yuji, Dami, and Haeryung's departure and said in a statement that Yuji and Dami had left the group to focus on their studies, while Haeryeong had left to pursue an acting career. They were replaced by Solji, a former member of vocal duo 2NB, and Hyelin, who was originally considered for EXID's original lineup before she was dropped. With the new members, EXID returned in August 2012 with their second single "I Feel Good" from their first EP Hippity Hop. Hippity Hop debuted at number 13 on the Gaon Albums Chart, selling 1,500 copies. EXID released the digital single "Every Night", in October. The title track is an alternate version of Elly's self-written song "Phone Call", which was recorded in their debut EP. "Every Night" debuted at number 43 on the Gaon Singles Chart, selling 105,000 digital copies.

On October 11, EXID released the song "Hey Boy" as part of the soundtrack release for MBC's sitcom The Thousandth Man. The song is the female version of B1A4's song "Hey Girl". Producer Shinsadong Tiger rearranged the song into a "reggae style" to create a different approach from B1A4's original version. It was revealed on November 30 that EXID, along with Big Star and D-Unit, would release a collaboration album, in addition to doing a special year of end show. The concert, entitled "The Bugs Show Vol. 1", was held on December 22 at the V-Hall in the Hongdae area of Seoul. On December 6, EXID won the rookie award at the 20th Korea Culture & Entertainment Awards.

In February 2013, EXID released the single "Up & Down", from the Incarnation of Money soundtrack. It was announced shortly afterwards that members Hani and Solji would form a subunit called "Dasoni". The sub-unit released their debut single "Goodbye" on February 15, with the B-side track "Said So Often".

=== 2014–2015: Breakthrough with "Up & Down" and rise in popularity ===
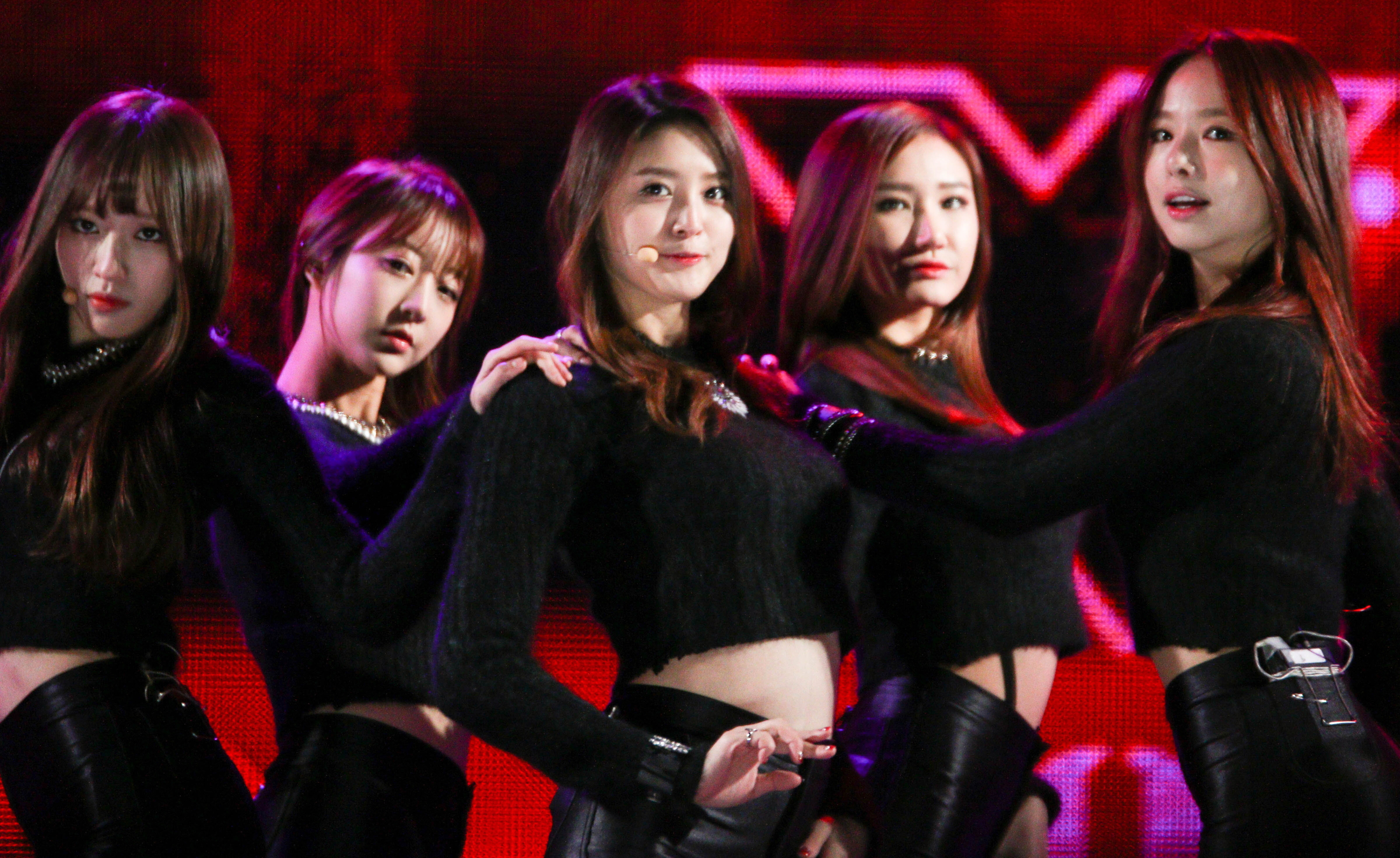
EXID in December 2014

In June 2014, EXID was announced to have signed an exclusive contract with Yedang Entertainment, and were preparing a comeback in collaboration with producer Shinsadong Tiger. On August 24, 2014, EXID held their comeback showcase at the Ilchi Art Hall, performing their new song "Up & Down". The song was released on August 27, 2014 and initially charted poorly, failing to make it onto the top 100 of the Gaon Chart; though it peaked at number 94 on the domestic chart. However, the song slowly gained popularity in early October 2014 after a fan-recorded video of Hani performing the song went viral on South Korean social networking websites. This led to the song shooting back up record charts, eventually climbing into the top 10 on the real-time charts and topping the Gaon Chart. Due to this success, EXID returned to several music programs to promote "Up & Down." The song was subsequently nominated for a first place award on Show! Music Core, Inkigayo, and M Countdown, where EXID took their first music show win since debut. The group won a second award at Music Bank on January 9, 2015, and a third one at Inkigayo on January 11, 2015.

On April 13, 2015, the music video for the title song "Ah Yeah", from EXID's second EP, was released. The group won first place with "Ah Yeah" on both April 26 and May 3 episodes of Inkigayo, as well as the April 29 and May 6 episodes of Show Champion.

In May 2015, the group made their first American performance at the Korean Music Festival in Los Angeles, California. EXID featured in their own season of the MBC Every 1 reality show Showtime in July 2015.

On November 7, 2015, EXID won the MBC Music Star Award at the 2015 Melon Music Awards. The music video for "Hot Pink" was released on November 17, 2015.

=== 2016: Chinese debut, Street, and Solji's hiatus ===
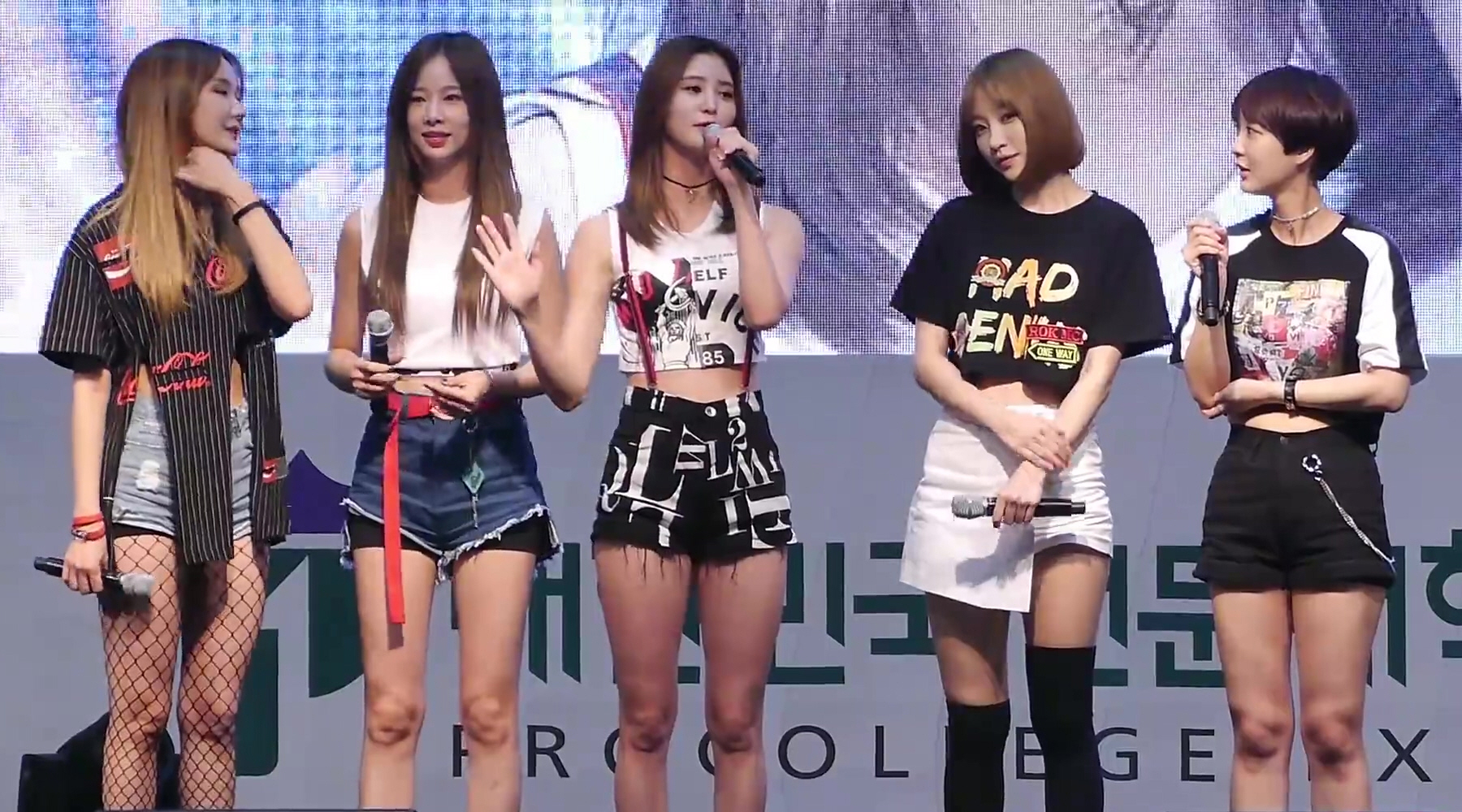
EXID on July 17, 2016

On January 11, 2016, EXID signed with China's entertainment company Banana Project in a bid to extend its popularity outside Korea. This sparked discussions regarding EXID's future activities in South Korea; however, CEO of Banana Culture Music Wang Sicong assured fans that the next album his company invested on EXID would be released simultaneously in China and South Korea.

On March 2, EXID's record label Yedang Entertainment changes name to Banana Culture, launching a joint venture company in Seoul with Banana Project. On March 18, EXID held their first Chinese fan meeting, 'EXID's LEGGO Show in Shanghai'.

On June 1, the group released their first studio album titled Street with the title track "L.I.E". Street includes 12 tracks, many of which were written and/or composed by Elly. EXID's first studio album also included "Hello", a solo song by lead vocalist Hani and "3%", a solo song sung by main vocalist Solji. The album peaked at number two in Korea on the Gaon Album Chart, while "L.I.E" peaked at number five as a single. On June 8, 2016, EXID won first place with "L.I.E" on Show Champion and soon after, they won first place on both Inkigayo and The Show as well.

On December 20, 2016, EXID released their first Chinese single, "Cream" on QQ Music and YinYueTai-which peaked at number six on the Billboard China V Chart. However, a day later, Banana Culture announced that Solji had been diagnosed with hyperthyroidism, and that she would halt all her activities for the awards season of 2016–17, while the remaining four members continue on.

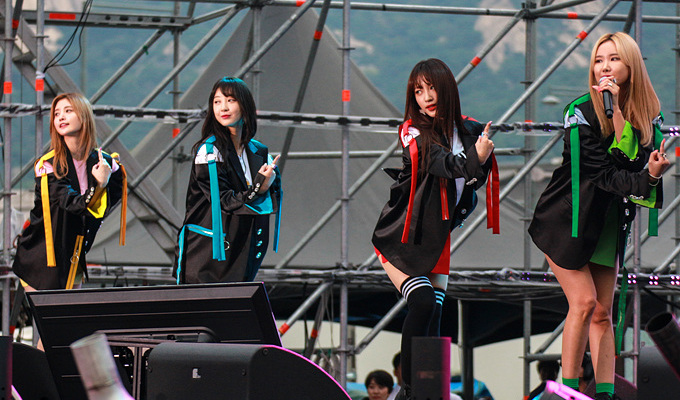
EXID performed "Night Rather Than Day" in August 2017

=== 2017: Promotions as four and EXID Asia Tour 2017 ===
On January 10, 2017, the group released their second Chinese single "Up & Down" (Chinese: 上下; pinyin: Shàngxià). On the same day of its release, an edited version music video for "Up & Down (Chinese Ver.)" was uploaded to YouTube and the original was removed. Some Chinese fans found EXID's dancing in the 'Forbidden City' to be inappropriate whilst some thought that it was completely normal.

On March 17, the four members of EXID excluding Solji performed at the Mexico City Arena as part of the KCON music festival in Mexico, with Hani covering Mexican duo Jesse & Joy's "Ecos De Amor".

Due to Solji's remaining health issues, the group's comeback was delayed until April. Their agency announced in March that EXID would return as a four-piece while Solji recovered from her hyperthyroidism. On April 10, EXID officially released their third EP Eclipse and their title song "Night Rather Than Day". Eclipse debuted at number four on the Billboard World Albums chart, becoming the group's best-charting – and first top-five – album on the chart to date. On April 25, 2017, EXID won first place on The Show with "Night Rather Than Day". This was followed by their second win with this song on Show Champion the following day and their third win on The Show on May 2, 2017.

On May 12, Banana Culture Entertainment has announced that EXID would embark on a promotional Asian tour during the summer. Titled ‘EXID Asia Tour 2017’, the group visited a handful of countries for the tour, starting in Hong Kong and Singapore. They originally planned to visited Taiwan on July 30, before performing a homecoming concert in Seoul on August 12; however, due to safety concerns over the threat of Typhoon Nesat, the Taiwanese show was postponed to August 26. Solji gave a surprise appearance at the encore of the Seoul concert before resuming her treatment; neither the audience nor the rest of the group knew of her visit. The Asian tour wrapped with their Taipei concert on August 26.

EXID's fourth mini album Full Moon was released on November 7, 2017. This marks the return of member Solji, who was absent from the group since 2016. This time, Solji only participated in the recording process but was absent from the promotions and the title track's music video. On November 21, 2017, EXID won first place on The Show with "DDD".

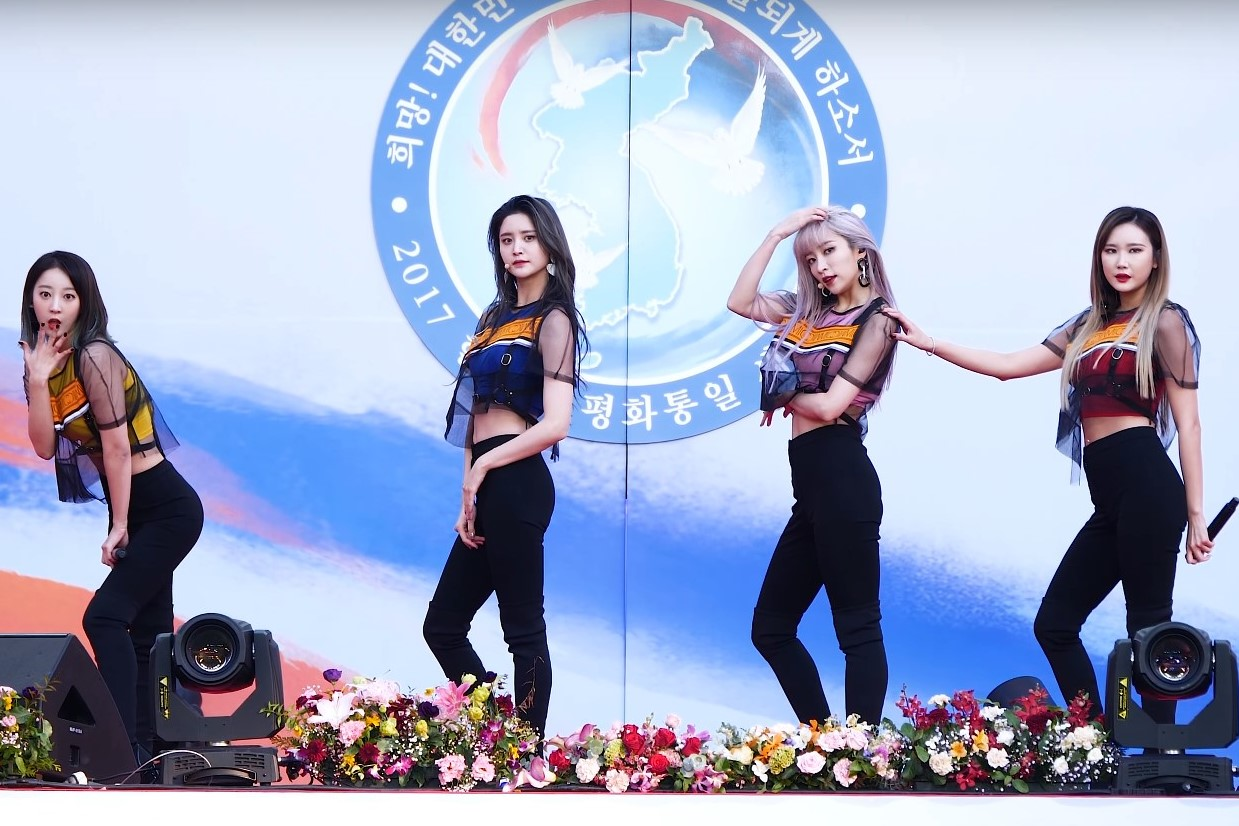
EXID performed "DDD" in November 2017

From December 2017 onwards, EXID, through their social media platforms, shared photo teasers for a project named re:flower, whose songs would be remasters and remakes of past their songs that weren't title songs.

=== 2018: Japanese debut and Solji's return ===
EXID returned with a single album Lady on April 2, 2018, only promoting as four, however, due to Solji still recovering from surgery. The lead track for the album is entitled "내일해 (Lady)". On April 10, 2018, EXID won first place on The Show with "Lady".

On 11 May, Banana Culture announced EXID's launching of their Japanese official website, which included a Japanese fan club. They also announced a debut showcase at Tokyo to be held on June 27. During the showcase, EXID announced their release of the Japanese version of "Up & Down" on August 22, as well as their first Japanese tour to be held between August 23 and 25, with Solji confirming that she will have returned by then.

On September 6, Banana Culture released a statement, announcing that Solji will join EXID on September 7 to attend the 2018 Hallyu Pop Festival in Singapore as her first official schedule. This marked the formal return of Solji into EXID, of which she will be joining in all of their future group promotions. Solji appeared with the rest of the group members on stage on August 10, on day 2 of HallyuPopFest 2018, in which she performed 5 of their title tracks with the group.

To further their promotions since their debut in Japan, the music video for the Japanese version of "Up & Down" was released early on August 10 before the launch of the Japanese debut album, which debuted at number 15 on the Daily chart of Oricon.

On November 11, EXID made a full-member comeback with the single album I Love You, while releasing the music video with the same title. "I Love You" entered Billboard's World Digital Song Sales chart at number 5, which was by far their highest achievement in the chart.

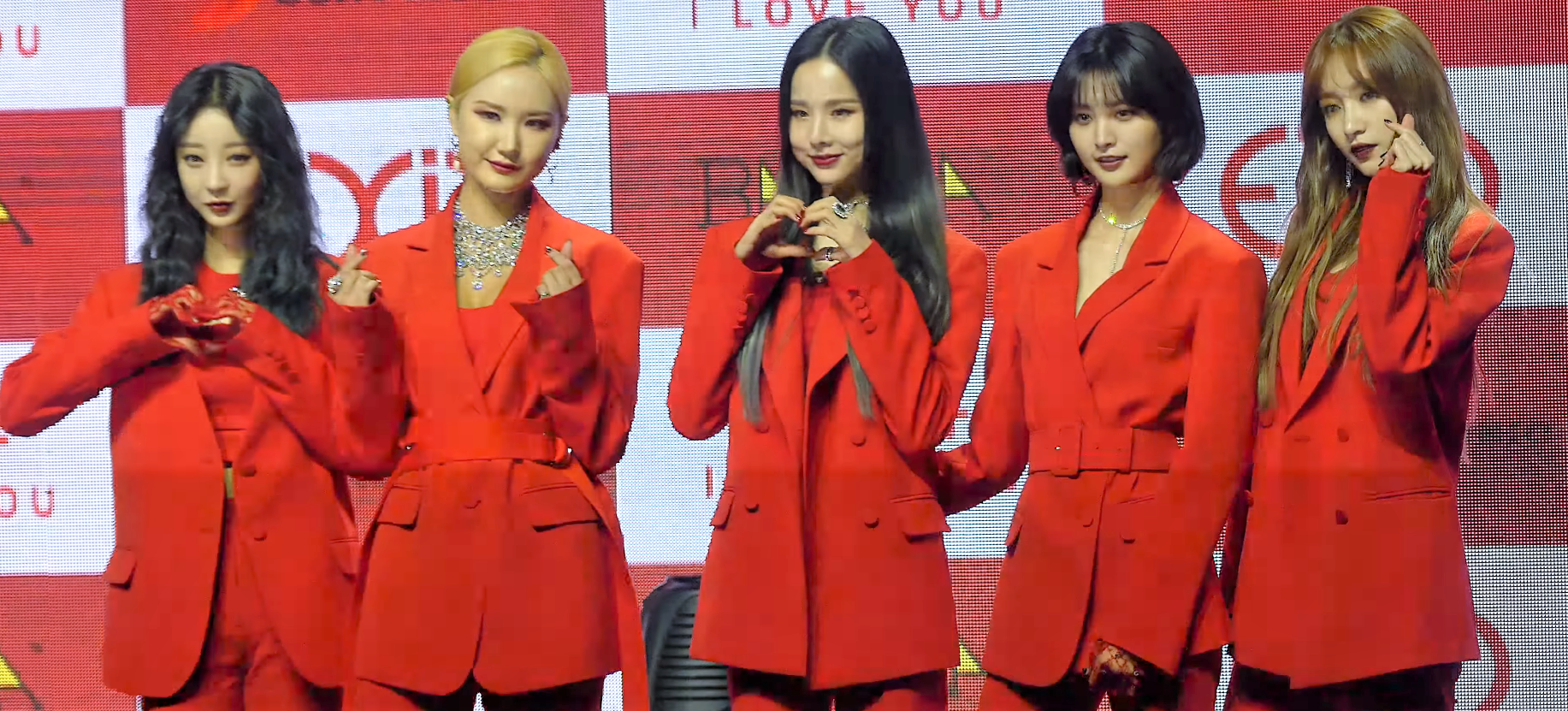
EXID promoting "I Love You" in November 2018

=== 2019: Group hiatus, Japanese activities, and 10th anniversary comeback ===
On December 31, 2018, EXID performed at Taipei New Year's Eve Countdown Party in Taipei, Taiwan, and stayed there through the countdown to 2019.

In February 2019, EXID held their second Japanese live tour, titled "2019 EXID Valentine Japan Live Tour". Their debut Japanese album, Trouble, was released on April 3, 2019. Trouble debuted and peaked at number 12 on the Oricon Albums Chart and at number 23 on Billboard Japan's Hot Albums. It also peaked at number 10 on Billboard Japan's Top Albums Sales, with 4,831 physical copies sold in its first week. In early May 2019, members Hani and Jeonghwa decided to not renew their contracts with Banana Culture. Shortly after, it was announced that the group will release an extended play on May 15, 2019. It was agreed that all the members would participate in promotion activities and after the promotions concluded, the group would enter an indefinite hiatus so each member could focus on individual activities. EXID released their fifth EP "We" alongside the title track "Me & You" on May 15, 2019. The EP debuted at 8 on the US World Albums Chart, becoming their fourth top 10 entry on the chart. It sold 24,423 physical copies in South Korea that month. Banana Culture later clarified that the group would continue activities as five in Japan for another year, with a Japanese tour entitled "2019 EXID Summer Live Tour" beginning in August. EXID released a Japanese single entitled "Bad Girl For You" on December 25.

=== 2020–present: Tenth anniversary reunion and independent management ===
On January 15, 2020, Hyelin also left Banana Culture, followed by Solji on February 5, and finally Elly on March 25. On August 19, EXID released their second Japanese album, B.L.E.S.S.E.D.

On July 14, 2022, it was announced that EXID will return to hold the 'EXID 2022 Japan-Final-Live Tour' in September, which was originally scheduled to be held in 2020, but had to be postponed due to COVID-19. On August 13, EXID came together for a special program celebrating their 10th anniversary. On September 7, EXID announced via SNS that they would release their 3-track single album X on September 29. They also set to hold their 10th anniversary Fan-con "EXID X LEGGO" on October 29.

Following the closure of Banana Culture in 2020, the members of EXID departed the agency and focused on individual activities. In 2022, the group reunited for the release of the single “Fire” in celebration of their tenth anniversary. During this period, the members assumed greater responsibility for the group’s business and creative activities. Hani secured the trademark rights to the group name, allowing the members to conduct activities under the EXID name independently. Member LE (also known as Elly) took on a leading role in music production and A&R for the group’s comeback.

While the members have managed certain aspects of their group promotions independently, each continues to maintain separate management arrangements for individual activities. The group’s 2022 comeback marked a shift toward increased member autonomy compared to their earlier agency-managed operations.

In March 2025, the group reunited to perform Baby Vox's "Get Up" for Immortal Songs 2's "Artist Baby Vox" special episode.

== Members ==
- Solji (솔지) – leader, vocalist (2012–present)
- Elly (엘리) – rapper (2012–present)
- Hani (하니) – vocalist, dancer (2012–present)
- Hyelin (혜린) – vocalist (2012–present)
- Jeonghwa (정화) – dancer, rapper, vocalist (2012–present)

=== Former members ===
- Dami (다미) – (2012)
- Yuji (유지) – (2012)
- Haeryung (해령) – (2012)

== Tours and concerts ==
Headlining

- EXID 1st Asia Tour FANCON Tour (2017)

Date	City	Country	Venue
June 17	Kowloon	Hong Kong	Star Hall Kitec
July 15	Kallang	Singapore	Kallang Theatre
July 20	Taipei	Taiwan	NTU Sports Center
August 12	Seoul	South Korea	Yonsei University Baekyang Hall

- EXID FANCON Tour (2024–2025)

2024
Date	City	Country	Venue
March 2	Tokyo	Japan	Zepp Haneda
2025
Date	City	Country	Venue
May 31	Ho Chi Minh City	Vietnam	Tân Bình Gymnasium
August 10	Macau	China	Broadway Theater

Japan tours

- EXID 1st Japan Live Tour (2018)
- EXID Valentine Japan Live Tour (2019)
- EXID 2019 Summer Live Tour ~Trouble~
- EXID 2020 Live Tour ~Bad Girl For You~
- EXID 2022 Japan -Final- Live Tour

Special concerts

- EXID's LEGGO SHOW (2016)

== Discography ==
- Street (2016)
- Trouble (2019)
- B.L.E.S.S.E.D (2020)

== Filmography ==
=== Reality shows ===
Year	Title	Note
2016	EXID's Showtime	8 episodes
2018	Made In EXID	25 episodes

=== Dramas ===
Year	Title	Role
2012	12 Signs of Love	Themselves (episode 8)

== Awards and nominations ==
Since debuting in 2012, EXID has won four various awards and 22 music program awards. On January 8, 2015, the group won their first number-one win on M Countdown due to the success of their digital single "Up & Down," followed by wins on Music Bank, Inkigayo and The Show.

Name of the award ceremony, year presented, category, nominee(s) of the award, and the result of the nomination
Award ceremony	Year	Category	Nominee / work	Result	Ref.
Arirang's Simply K-Pop Awards	2012	Super Rookie Idol of the Year	EXID	Won	
Cable TV Broadcast Awards	2015	Star Award	EXID	Won	
Gaon Chart K-Pop Awards	2015	Discovery of the Year	EXID	Won	
Golden Disc Awards	2016	Digital Bonsang	"Up & Down"	Won	
Golden Disc Awards	2016	Digital Daesang	"Up & Down"	Nominated	
Golden Disc Awards	2017	Digital Bonsang	"L.I.E"	Nominated	
Korea Assembly Grand Award	2016	Artist of the Year	EXID	Won	
Korean Culture and Entertainment Awards	2012	Rookie Award	EXID	Won	
Korean Entertainment Arts Awards	2018	Best Artist Group (Female)	EXID	Won	
MBC Music Show Champion Awards	2015	Best Champion Songs of 2015	"Ah Yeah"	Won	
MBC Music Show Champion Awards	2015	Best Performance – Female	"Hot Pink"	Won	
Melon Music Awards	2015	MBC Music Star Award	EXID	Won	
Melon Music Awards	2015	Top 10 Artist Award	EXID	Nominated	
Melon Music Awards	2015	Best Female Dance Song	"Ah Yeah"	Nominated	
Melon Music Awards	2015	Song Of The Year	"Ah Yeah"	Nominated	
Mnet Asian Music Awards	2015	Best Dance Performance – Female Group	"Ah Yeah"	Nominated	
Mnet Asian Music Awards	2015	Song of the Year	"Ah Yeah"	Nominated	
Seoul Music Awards	2016	Bonsang Award	EXID	Won	
Seoul Music Awards	2016	High1/Mobile Popularity Award	EXID	Nominated	
Seoul Music Awards	2016	Hallyu Special Award	EXID	Nominated	
Seoul Music Awards	2018	Bonsang Award	EXID	Nominated	
Seoul Music Awards	2018	Popularity Award	EXID	Nominated	
Seoul Music Awards	2018	Hallyu Special Award	EXID	Nominated	
YinYueTai V Chart Awards	2016	Best Breakout Artist	EXID	Won	
