= Seo Hye-lin =

South Korean singer (born 1993)

Hyelin
- 서혜린
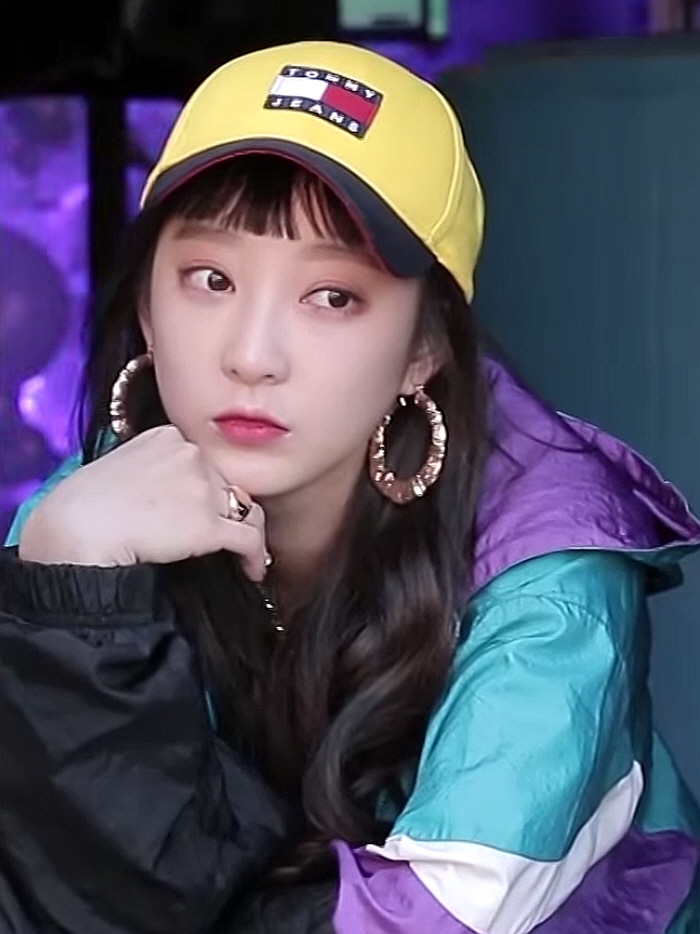
- Hyelin in 2018
- Born: Seo Hye-lin; August 23, 1993 (age 33); Gwangju, South Korea
- Education: Dongduk Women's University
- Occupations: Singer, DJ
- Agent: SidusHQ
- Musical career
- Genres: K-pop
- Instrument: Vocals
- Years active: 2012–present
- Label: Banana Culture
- Member of: EXID

Korean name
- Hangul: 서혜린
- Hanja: 徐慧潾
- RR: Seo Hyerin
- MR: Sŏ Hyerin

Signature
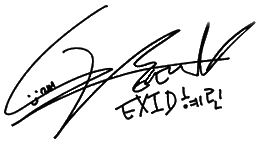

Seo Hye-lin (Korean: 서혜린; born August 23, 1993), referred to as Hyelin, is a South Korean singer and DJ. She is best known as a member of the South Korean girl group EXID.

== Career ==
In 2011, she participated in Mnet's Superstar K3, making it through the auditions to "SuperWeek".

In April 2012, AB Entertainment announced that the three original members Yuji, Dami and Na Hae-ryung would leave EXID. Hye-lin then joined the group along with Heo Sol-ji.

In April 2019, Hyelin opened her own YouTube channel 'Jeul-Lin TV' short for 'Joy Full-Lin TV'.

On January 15, 2020, Hyelin terminated her contract with Banana Culture and left the agency.

On May 6, 2020, Hyelin signed an exclusive contract with SidusHQ.

On May 6, 2021, Hyelin made her solo debut with the digital single "Lonely".

== Discography ==
=== Singles ===
Title	Year	Album
"1990s" (with Park Joon-hyung, Lee Ji-hye, Jang Soo Won and Hyelin)	2016	The Event King of the Month
"Lonely" (알아주길 바랬어)	2021	1st single-album
"Love Letter"	2022	Cherry Blossoms After Winter OST

== Filmography ==
=== Television show ===
Year	Title	Role	Notes	Ref.
2011	Superstar K3	Contestant		
2014	Always Cantare	Cast Member		
2015	EXID's Showtime	Cast Member		
2016	King of Mask Singer	Contestant	as "Cheerleader in Victory"	
2016	The Event King of the Month	Cast Member		
2017	Empty the Convenience Store	Cast Member		
2017	Battle Trip	Special MC	Episode 52–53	
2021	Celebeauty	MC	Season 3	
2022	Travel	Cast Member		

== Ambassadorship ==
- Public Relations Ambassador for Namyangju (2020–present)
