= Shinsadong Tiger =

South Korean music producer (1983–2024)

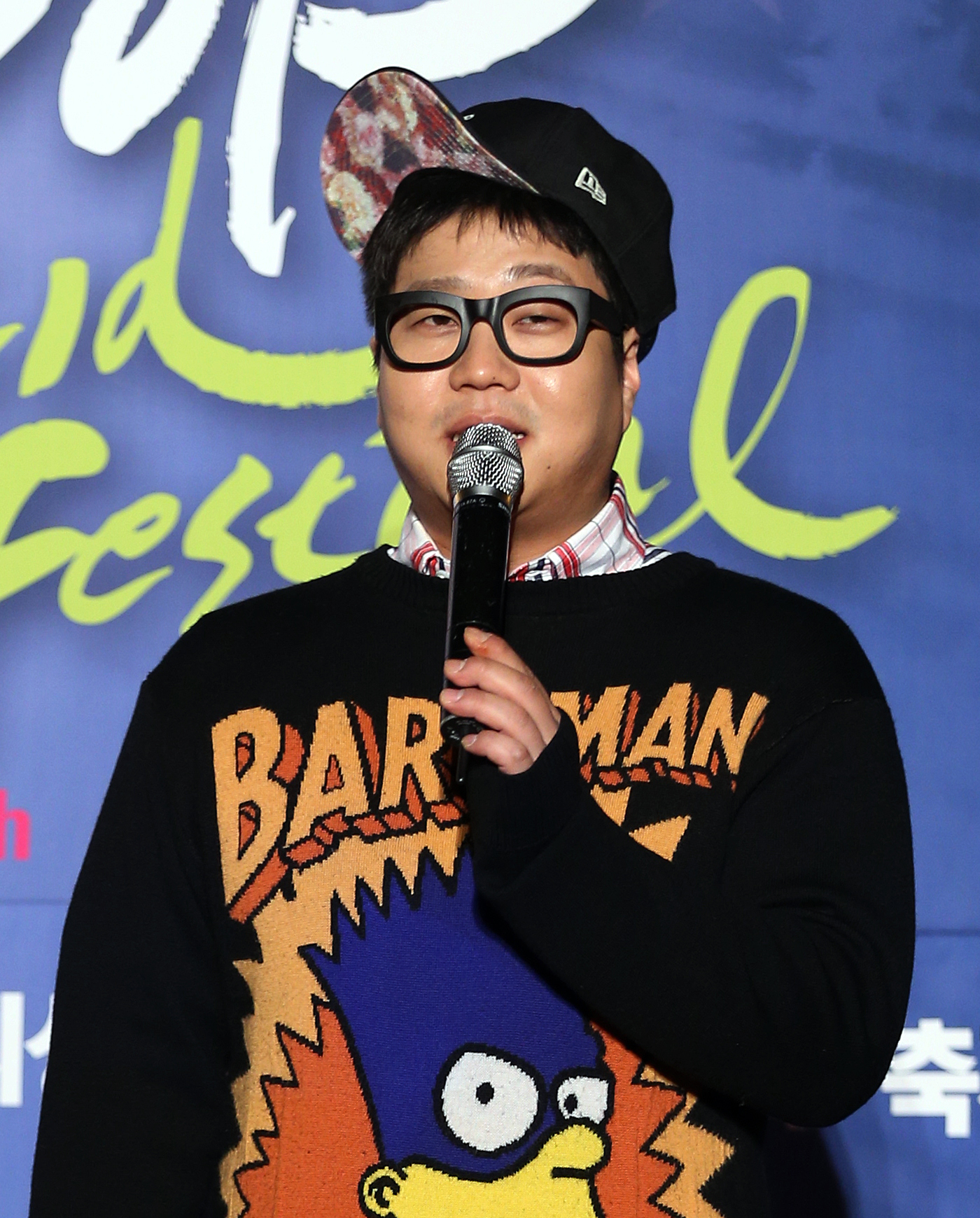
- Lee in 2013

Background information
- Also known as: Shinsadong Horaengi; S. Tiger
- Born: Lee Ho-yang; June 3, 1983; Pohang, South Korea
- Died: February 23, 2024 (aged 40) Seoul, South Korea
- Genres: K-pop; dance-pop; electropop
- Years active: 2001–2024
- Labels: Own label: TR Entertainment; Partnership label: Cube Entertainment; Rainbow Bridge World

- Korean name
- Hangul: 이호양
- Hanja: 李浩楊
- RR: I Hoyang
- MR: I Hoyang

Stage name
- Hangul: 신사동호랭이
- Hanja: 新沙洞호랭이
- RR: Sinsa-dong Horaengi
- MR: Sinsa-dong Horaengi

Lee Ho-yang (June 3, 1983 – February 23, 2024), known professionally as Shinsadong Tiger, was a South Korean music producer and songwriter. After debuting in 2001 at the age of 18, he still worked several odd jobs to fund his music career. He was a known figure in the Korean pop music industry and is responsible for a number of popular songs. In 2010, he was named the "New Generation Producer" at the 18th Korean Culture Entertainment Awards, and in 2011, he was named one of the most influential figures in the South Korean music industry by OSEN. Lee also started his own label, AB Entertainment, in which he debuted his own girl group, EXID.

== Early life ==
Lee Ho-yang was born on June 3, 1983, in Pohang, South Korea, where he attended elementary school. He began his fascination with music during junior high. He auditioned for JYP Entertainment but was rejected.

== Career ==
After debuting at the age of 19, Lee began to rise to prominence for his work with K-Pop artists. Apart from composing for various artists, he was also noted for his role in managing the girl group EXID as well as the opening of the Modern K Music Academy. He was criticized for his emphasis on following trends in popular music and producing commercial music for "idols". Lee started to use arbitrary inspiration for his composition style, including toilet rolls as his inspiration for the hook-heavy "Bo Peep Bo Peep".

In 2011, he released his own self-produced single, "Supermarket – The Half", in which Yoon Doo-joon, Yong Jun-hyung and Lee Gi-kwang of BEAST are featured on the track "Should I Hug Or Not?" (Korean: 안을까 말까). In 2012, he released his new album, "Supermarket – Another Half", included tracks "Over and Over" by 4minute, "Stop Doing That" by G.NA, and "In the Cloud", a solo track by B2ST member Son Dong-woon. "In The Cloud" released at April 24, 00:00 KST.

In May 2014, Wellmade Yedang became the largest shareholder in Shinsadong Tiger's entertainment agency, Cashmere Records.

In 2018, he worked on the music production of Idol Producer. He composed and arranged Momoland's hit song "Bboom Bboom" (뿜뿜).

In 2021, Lee teamed up with frequent collaborator Elly to form and debut the group Tri.be.

== Death ==
Lee was found dead in his recording studio on February 23, 2024. He was 40.

== Discography ==
=== Digital singles ===
- "Supermarket – The Half" – credited to Beast (2011)
- "Super Hero" with Mighty Mouth (2011)

== Awards ==
Awards received by Shinsadong Tiger
Year	Nominated work	Event	Award	Result
2013	"U&I" (Ailee) "NoNoNo" (A Pink) "Now" (Trouble Maker)	Melon Music Awards	Song Writer Award	Won
