= List of King of Mask Singer episodes (2015) =

- No. of episodes: Pilot: 1; Special Live: 1; Regular: 39

Release
- Original network: MBC
- Original release: February 18 (Pilot); April 5, 2015 – December 27, 2015

Season chronology
- ← Previous; Season 2014 Next → 2016

This is a list of episodes of the South Korean variety-music show King of Mask Singer in 2015. The show airs on MBC as part of their Sunday Night lineup. The names listed below are in performance order. A new rule was introduced in Episode 5, with the eliminated singer being allowed to sing the next song they prepared, and taking off their mask during the instrumental break of their song.

– Contestant is instantly eliminated by the live audience and judging panel
– After being eliminated, contestant performs a prepared song for the next round and takes off their mask during the instrumental break
– After being eliminated and revealing their identity, contestant has another special performance
– Contestant advances to the next round
– Contestant becomes the challenger
– Mask King

== Episodes ==
=== Pilot ===
- Contestants : Jo Kwon (2AM), Kim Ye-won, Lee Deok-jin, K.Will, Shin Bo-ra, Solji (EXID), Won Ki-joon, Hong Jin-young
Episode 0 (Pilot)

The pilot was broadcast on 18 February 2015.

Round 1

Order	Stage Name	Real Name	Song	Original artist	Vote
Round 1
Pair 1	Blue Bird that looks like an oriole	Jo Kwon of 2AM	Man and Woman (남과 여)	Park Seon-joo & Kim Bum-soo	48
Pair 1	Orange That wears feathers	Kim Ye-won	Man and Woman (남과 여)	Park Seon-joo & Kim Bum-soo	51
Pair 2	Charismatic Confidante of the Starry Sky	Lee Deok-jin	Until the Morning Has Dawned (아침이 밝아올 때까지)	Deulgukhwa	41
Pair 2	Opera Star	K.Will	Until the Morning Has Dawned (아침이 밝아올 때까지)	Deulgukhwa	58
Pair 3	Self Luminous 14K	Shin Bora	Don't Touch Me (손대지마)	Ailee	44
Pair 3	Self-Luminous Mosaic	Solji of EXID	Don't Touch Me (손대지마)	Ailee	55
Pair 4	Peacock Madam	Won Ki-joon	I Have a Lover (애인 있어요)	Lee Eun-mi	N/A
Pair 4	Cute Heart Bbyong Bbyong	Hong Jin-young	I Have a Lover (애인 있어요)	Lee Eun-mi	N/A
Round 2
Pair 1	Orange that wears feathers	Kim Ye-won	The Lost Umbrella (잃어버린 우산)	Woo Soon-sil	51
Pair 1	Opera Star	K.Will	I Want to Cry (울고 싶어라)	Lee Nam-yi	48
Pair 2	Self-Luminous Mosaic	Solji of EXID	The Reason I Became a Singer (가수가 된 이유)	Shin Yong-jae	53
Pair 2	Cute Heart bbyong bbyong	Hong Jin-young	I Tried Everything (별 짓 다해봤는데)	Ali	46
Final
Battle	Orange that wears feathers	Kim Ye-won	Fate (인연)	Lee Sun-hee	46
Battle	Self-Luminous Mosaic	Solji of EXID	We Should've Been Friends (친구라도 될 걸 그랬어)	Gummy	53

=== 1st Generation Mask King ===
- Contestants : Kang Kyun-sung (Noel), Ivy, Kim Ji-woo, Luna (f(x)), Sandeul (B1A4), Jung Cheol-gyu, Park Gwang-hyun, Kwon In-ha
Episodes 1 – 2

Episode 1

Episode 1 was broadcast on April 5, 2015. This marks the beginning of the First Generation.

Order	Stage Name	Real Name	Song	Original artist	Vote
Opening	Self-Luminous Mosaic	Solji of EXID	Maria (Korean version)	Kim Ah-joong	–
Round 1
Pair 1	House Out Lion	Kang Kyun-sung of Noel	Farewell Under the Sun (대낮에 한 이별)	Park Jin-young & Sunye	39
Pair 1	Sharp White Cat	Ivy	Farewell Under the Sun (대낮에 한 이별)	Park Jin-young & Sunye	60
Pair 2	Blue Butterfly	Kim Ji-woo	A Flying Butterfly (나는 나비)	YB	45
Pair 2	Used Two Buckets of Gold Lacquer	Luna of f(x)	A Flying Butterfly (나는 나비)	YB	54
Pair 3	Electric Shock Caution Action Robot	Jung Cheol-gyu	Still Eating Well (밥만 잘 먹더라)	Homme	21
Pair 3	Flowering Silky Fowl	Sandeul of B1A4	Still Eating Well (밥만 잘 먹더라)	Homme	78
Pair 4	Find the Missing Half	Park Gwang-hyun	Scar Deeper Than Love (사랑보다 깊은 상처)	Lena Park & Yim Jae-beom	38
Pair 4	Fly Taekwon Boy	Kwon In-ha	Scar Deeper Than Love (사랑보다 깊은 상처)	Lena Park & Yim Jae-beom	61

Episode 2

Episode 2 was broadcast on April 12, 2015.

Order	Stage Name	Real Name	Song	Original artist	Vote
Round 2
Pair 1	Sharp White Cat	Ivy	My One Day (나의 하루)	Lena Park	40
Pair 1	Flowering Silky Fowl	Sandeul of B1A4	Emergency Room (응급실)	izi	59
Pair 2	Fly Taekwon Boy	Kwon In-ha	If (만약에)	Taeyeon	42
Pair 2	Used Two Buckets of Gold Lacquer	Luna of f(x)	Mom (엄마)	Ra.D	57
Final
Battle	Flowering Silky Fowl	Sandeul of B1A4	Brand (낙인)	Yim Jae-beom	47
Battle	Used Two Buckets of Gold Lacquer	Luna of f(x)	I Will Write a Letter to You (편지할게요)	Lena Park	52

=== 2nd Generation Mask King ===
- Contestants : Navi, Kim Jong-seo, Shin Soo-ji, Hyun Woo, Lee Chang-min (2AM/Homme), Lee Hong-gi (F.T. Island), Jang Hye-jin, G.NA
Episodes 3 – 4

Episode 3

Episode 3 was broadcast on April 19, 2015. This marks the beginning of the Second Generation.

Order	Stage Name	Real Name	Song	Original artist	Vote
Round 1
Pair 1	Exactly Cut in Half	Navi	Something	Girl's Day	58
Pair 1	Constantly Careful of the Volcano	Kim Jong-seo	If I Leave (나 가거든)	Sumi Jo	41
Pair 2	Crooked Mouth Cherry	Shin Soo-ji	Binari (비나리)	Sim Soo-bong	44
Pair 2	Through the Hidden Web	Hyun Woo	Should I Say I Love You Again? (다시 사랑한다 말할까)	Kim Dong-ryul	55
Pair 3	That Pine on Namsan	Lee Changmin of 2AM/Homme	Place Where You Need to Be (니가 있어야 할 곳)	g.o.d	51
Pair 3	Blow Hot and Cold Bat Human	Lee Hong-gi of F.T. Island	Addicted Love (중독된 사랑)	Jo Jang-hyuk	48
Pair 4	Elegant Plaster Madam	Jang Hye-jin	Day with Good Feeling (예감 좋은 날)	Rumble Fish	52
Pair 4	Fox in Wonderland	G.NA	Just Like Yesterday (어제처럼)	J.ae	47

Episode 4

Episode 4 was broadcast on April 26, 2015.

Order	Stage Name	Real Name	Song	Original artist	Vote
Round 2
Pair 1	That Pine on Namsan	Lee Changmin	Can't I? (안 되나요)	Wheesung	34
Pair 1	Elegant Plaster Madam	Jang Hye-jin	From January to June (1월부터 6월까지)	015B & Yoon Jong-shin	65
Pair 2	Through the Hidden Web	Hyun Woo	Running in the Sky (하늘을 달리다)	Lee Juck	31
Pair 2	Exactly Cut in Half	Navi	As Time Goes By (시간이 흐른 뒤)	Yoon Mi-rae	68
Round 3
Finalists	Elegant Plaster Madam	Jang Hye-jin	Fate (인연)	Lee Seung-chul	44
Finalists	Exactly Cut in Half	Navi	Adult Child (어른아이)	Gummy	55
Final
Battle	Exactly Cut in Half	Navi	Previous three songs used as voting standard		N/A
Battle	Used Two Buckets of Gold Lacquer	Luna of f(x)	Don't Think You're Alone (혼자라고 생각말기)	Kim Bo-kyung	N/A

=== 3rd Generation Mask King ===
- Contestants : Kahi, Yook Sung-jae (BtoB), Lee Jong-won (Can), Park Joon-myeon, Jinju, Eric Nam, Park Hak-gi, Song Ji-eun (Secret)
Episodes 5 – 6

Episode 5

Episode 5 was broadcast on May 3, 2015. This marks the beginning of the Third Generation.

Order	Stage Name	Real Name	Song	Original artist	Vote
Round 1
Pair 1	Mascara Smudged Pussycat	Kahi	That Man, That Woman (그 남자 그 여자)	Vibe & Jang Hye-jin	40
Pair 1	Tired Bumblebee	Yook Sungjae of BtoB	That Man, That Woman (그 남자 그 여자)	Vibe & Jang Hye-jin	59
2nd Song	Mascara Smudged Pussycat	Kahi	To You Again (너에게로 또 다시)	Byun Jin-sub	–
Pair 2	Help! Silverman	Lee Jong-won of Can	That Was What Happened Then (그땐 그랬지)	Carnival	54
Pair 2	Our House Dog Happy	Park Joon-myeon	That Was What Happened Then (그땐 그랬지)	Carnival	45
2nd Song	Our House Dog Happy	Park Joon-myeon	Forever Friends (영원한 친구)	Na-mi	–
Pair 3	Jingle Jingle Lark	Jinju	All for You	Cool	51
Pair 3	Hello Mr. Monkey	Eric Nam	All for You	Cool	48
2nd Song	Hello Mr. Monkey	Eric Nam	Standing in the Shades of Tree (가로수 그늘 아래 서면)	Lee Moon-sae	–
Pair 4	Dream of Deviant Cabbage Ascetic	Park Hak-gi	Farewell Story (이별 이야기)	Lee Moon-sae & Go Eun-hee	42
Pair 4	I'm Happy Because of Rabbits	Song Jieun of Secret	Farewell Story (이별 이야기)	Lee Moon-sae & Go Eun-hee	57
2nd Song	Dream of Deviant Cabbage Ascetic	Park Hak-gi	A Thorn Tree (가시나무)	Jo Sung-mo	–

Episode 6

Episode 6 was broadcast on May 10, 2015.

Order	Stage Name	Real Name	Song	Original artist	Vote
Round 2
Pair 1	Tired Bumblebee	Yook Sungjae of BtoB	One Day Long Ago (오래전 그 날)	Yoon Jong-shin	64
Pair 1	Help! Silverman	Lee Jong-won of CAN	Footsteps (발걸음)	Emerald Castle	35
Pair 2	Jingle Jingle Lark	Jinju	Wind is Blowing (바람이 분다)	Lee So-ra	51
Pair 2	I'm Happy Because of Rabbits	Song Jieun of Secret	Love is Rainwater Outside the Window (사랑은 창밖에 빗물 같아요)	Yang Soo-kyung	48
Round 3
Finalists	Tired Bumblebee	Yook Sungjae of BtoB	Thanks (감사)	Kim Dong-ryul	31
Finalists	Jingle Jingle Lark	Jinju	I Will Show You (보여줄게)	Ailee	68
Final
Battle	Used Two Buckets of Gold Lacquer	Luna of f(x)	Sad Fate (슬픈 인연)	Lee Eun-mi	43
Battle	Jingle Jingle Lark	Jinju	Previous three songs used as voting standard		56

Luna released a digital special single "Don't Cry For Me" (미소를 띄우며 나를 보낸 그 모습처럼) for the show after her elimination. The song is a remake of Lee Eun-ha's 1986 version.

=== 4th Generation Mask King ===
- Contestants : Ailee, Yook Jung-wan (Rose Motel), Hong Seok-cheon, Taeil (Block B), Kim Yeon-woo, Bae Da-hae, Lee Geon-myung, Sojin (Girl's Day)
Episodes 7 – 8

Episode 7

Episode 7 was broadcast on May 17, 2015. This marks the beginning of the Fourth Generation.

Order	Stage Name	Real Name	Song	Original artist	Vote
Round 1
Pair 1	High Frequency Pair Feelers	Ailee	The Blue in You (그대 안의 블루)	Kim Hyun-chul & Lee So-ra	54
Pair 1	Daddy, Cheer Up!	Yuk Joong-wan of Rose Motel	The Blue in You (그대 안의 블루)	Kim Hyun-chul & Lee So-ra	45
2nd Song	Daddy, Cheer Up!	Yuk Joong-wan of Rose Motel	Bounce	Cho Yong-pil	–
Pair 2	Hardware Store Boss Kim	Hong Seok-cheon	Feeling Only You (너만을 느끼며)	The Blue	34
Pair 2	SangAmDong Whistle	Taeil of Block B	Feeling Only You (너만을 느끼며)	The Blue	65
2nd Song	Hardware Store Boss Kim	Hong Seok-cheon	First Impression (첫 인상)	Kim Gun-mo	–
Pair 3	CBR Cleopatra	Kim Yeon-woo	The Phantom of the Opera (Korean version) (오페라의 유령)	Andrew Lloyd Webber	50
Pair 3	Storm and Gale Unicorn	Bae Da-hae	The Phantom of the Opera (Korean version) (오페라의 유령)	Andrew Lloyd Webber	49
2nd Song	Storm and Gale Unicorn	Bae Da-hae	About Romance (낭만에 대하여)	Choi Baek-ho	–
Pair 4	Dance with the Wolf	Lee Geon-myung	Like Rain, Like Music (비처럼 음악처럼)	Kim Hyun-sik	57
Pair 4	Faux-naif Red Fox	Sojin of Girl's Day	Like Rain, Like Music (비처럼 음악처럼)	Kim Hyun-sik	42
2nd Song	Faux-naif Red Fox	Sojin of Girl's Day	Caution (경고)	Tashannie (타샤니)	–

Episode 8

Episode 8 was broadcast on May 24, 2015.

Order	Stage Name	Real Name	Song	Original artist	Vote
Round 2
Pair 1	High Frequency Pair Feelers	Ailee	For You (너를 위해)	Im Jae-bum	67
Pair 1	Sangamdong Whistle	Taeil of Block B	Doll (인형)	Lee Ji-hoon & Shin Hye-sung	32
Pair 2	CBR Cleopatra	Kim Yeon-woo	If by Chance (만약에 말야)	Noel	N/A
Pair 2	Dance with the Wolf	Lee Geon-myung	Will Forget (잊을게)	YB	N/A
Round 3
Finalists	High Frequency Pair Feelers	Ailee	Bruise (멍)	Kim Hyun-jung	41
Finalists	CBR Cleopatra	Kim Yeon-woo	Cannot Have You (가질 수 없는 너)	Bank	58
Final
Battle	Jingle Jingle Lark	Jinju	Twinkle	Girls' Generation-TTS	19
Battle	CBR Cleopatra	Kim Yeon-woo	Previous three songs used as voting standard		80

=== 5th Generation Mask King ===
- Contestants : Im Se-joon, Kim Seul-gi, Chunji (Teen Top), Min (Miss A), Ahn Jae-mo, Baek Chung-kang, Jo Jang-hyuk, Seo In-young
Episodes 9 – 10

Episode 9

Episode 9 was broadcast on May 31, 2015. This marks the beginning of the Fifth Generation.

Order	Stage Name	Real Name	Song	Original artist	Vote
Round 1
Pair 1	Perfume of Mosquito Time	Im Se-joon	The Days (그날들)	Kim Kwang-seok	60
Pair 1	Master Key Finished in 3 Seconds	Kim Seul-gi	The Days (그날들)	Kim Kwang-seok	39
2nd Song	Master Key Finished in 3 Seconds	Kim Seul-gi	Whistle (휘파람)	Lee Moon-sae	–
Pair 2	Romantic Pair of Diamond	Chunji of Teen Top	Doll's Dream (인형의 꿈)	Weather Forecast	53
Pair 2	Moaning Voice That Fans the Flames	Min of Miss A	Doll's Dream (인형의 꿈)	Weather Forecast	46
2nd Song	Moaning Voice That Fans the Flames	Min of Miss A	Poison	Uhm Jung-hwa	–
Pair 3	To the Loving and Passionate You	Ahn Jae-mo	Just the Way We Love (우리 사랑 이대로)	Joo Young-hoon & Lee Hye-jin	43
Pair 3	Mystery Stamp Bride	Baek Chung-kang	Just the Way We Love (우리 사랑 이대로)	Joo Young-hoon & Lee Hye-jin	56
2nd Song	To the Loving and Passionate You	Ahn Jae-mo	The Sky in the West (서쪽 하늘)	Lee Seung-chul	–
Pair 4	Lightning in a Dry Sky	Jo Jang-hyuk	The Flower That Could Not Blossom (못다 핀 꽃 한 송이)	Kim Soo-chul	52
Pair 4	Daebak Chance 1+1	Seo In-young	The Flower That Could Not Blossom (못다 핀 꽃 한 송이)	Kim Soo-chul	47
2nd Song	Daebak Chance 1+1	Seo In-young	Confession (고백)	Park Hye-kyung	–

Episode 10

Episode 10 was broadcast on June 7, 2015.

Order	Stage Name	Real Name	Song	Original artist	Vote
Round 2
Pair 1 |	Perfume of Mosquito Time	Im Se-joon	You're in My Embrace (그대 내 품에)	Yoo Jae-ha	69
Pair 1 |	Romantic Pair of Diamond	Chunji of Teen Top	A Night Like Tonight (오늘 같은 밤이면)	Park Jeong-woon	30
Pair 2	Mystery Stamp Bride	Baek Chung-kang	Fix My Makeup (화장을 고치고)	Wax	25
Pair 2	Lightning in a Dry Sky	Jo Jang-hyuk	Fortunately (다행이다)	Lee Juck	74
Round 3
Finalists	Perfume of Mosquito Time	Im Se-joon	Like Being Shot by a Bullet (총 맞은 것처럼)	Baek Ji-young	35
Finalists	Lightning in a Dry Sky	Jo Jang-hyuk	Please (제발)	Deulgukhwa	64
Final
Battle	Lightning in a Dry Sky	Jo Jang-hyuk	Previous three songs used as voting standard		30
Battle	CBR Cleopatra	Kim Yeon-woo	After This Night (이 밤이 지나면)	Yim Jae-beom	69

=== 6th Generation Mask King ===
- Contestants : Seon Woo, Na Yoon-kwon, Hyun Jyu-ni, Yoon Hyung-bin, Go Yoo-jin (Flower), Ken (VIXX), Jang Seok-hyun (S#arp), Jung Eun-ji (Apink)
Episodes 11 – 12

Episode 11

Episode 11 was broadcast on June 14, 2015. This marks the beginning of the Sixth Generation.

Order	Stage Name	Real Name	Song	Original artist	Vote
Round 1
Pair 1	Sauna Addicted Sheep Head	Seon Woo	It's You (그대네요)	Sung Si-kyung & IU	35
Pair 1	Mount Kilimanjaro Leopard	Na Yoon-kwon	It's You (그대네요)	Sung Si-kyung & IU	64
2nd Song	Sauna Addicted Sheep Head	Seon Woo	Aemo (애모)	Kim Soo-hee	–
Pair 2	Red Bean Shaved Ice	Hyun Jyu-ni	It's Gonna Be Rolling	Park Hyo-shin & Lee So-ra	61
Pair 2	Gone with the Wind	Yoon Hyung-bin	It's Gonna Be Rolling	Park Hyo-shin & Lee So-ra	38
2nd Song	Gone with the Wind	Yoon Hyung-bin	One More Drink (한잔 더)	Bobby Kim	–
Pair 3	Pressure Rice Cooker	Go Yoo-jin of Flower	Missing You	Fly to the Sky	46
Pair 3	Cracked Egg and Noodles	Ken of VIXX	Missing You	Fly to the Sky	53
2nd Song	Pressure Rice Cooker	Go Yoo-jin of Flower	You're the Only One for Me (오직 너뿐인 나를)	Lee Seung-chul	–
Pair 4	Beethoven Virus	Jang Seok-hyun of S#arp	A Star Goes Down (별이 진다네)	Travel Sketch	41
Pair 4	Mother Said Nope to UV	Jung Eun-ji of Apink	A Star Goes Down (별이 진다네)	Travel Sketch	58
2nd Song	Beethoven Virus	Jang Seok-hyun of S#arp	Nocturne (녹턴)	Lee Eun-mi	–

Episode 12

Episode 12 was broadcast on June 21, 2015.

Order	Stage Name	Real Name	Song	Original artist	Vote
Round 2
Pair 1	Mount Kilimanjaro Leopard	Na Yoon-kwon	Heeya (희야)	Boohwal	73
Pair 1	Red Bean Shaved Ice	Hyun Jyu-ni	Break Away	Big Mama	26
Pair 2	Cracked Egg and Noodles	Ken of VIXX	Don't Be Happy (행복하지 말아요)	MC the Max	40
Pair 2	Mother Said Nope to UV	Jung Eun-ji of Apink	I Hate You (미워요)	Choi Jung-in	59
Round 3
Finalists	Mount Kilimanjaro Leopard	Na Yoon-kwon	With Me	Wheesung	43
Finalists	Mother Said Nope to UV	Jung Eun-ji of Apink	Love Rain (사랑비)	Kim Tae-woo	56
Final
Battle	Mother said Nope to UV	Jung Eun-ji of Apink	Previous three songs used as voting standard		11
Battle	CBR Cleopatra	Kim Yeon-woo	Love...That Person (사랑.. 그 놈)	Bobby Kim	88

=== 7th Generation Mask King ===
- Contestants : Lyn, Go Myung-hwan, Song Won-geun, Lee Ki-chan, Choi Jung-in, Gaeko (Dynamic Duo), Moon Hee-kyung, Kim Boa (Spica)
Episodes 13 – 14

Episode 13

Episode 13 was broadcast on June 28, 2015. This marks the beginning of the Seventh Generation.

Order	Stage Name	Real Name	Song	Original artist	Vote
Round 1
Pair 1	Young and Sexy Post Box	Lyn	Unpredictable Life (알 수 없는 세상)	Lee Moon-sae	50
Pair 1	God of Feasts Tambourine	Go Myung-hwan	Unpredictable Life (알 수 없는 세상)	Lee Moon-sae	49
2nd Song	God of Feasts Tambourine	Go Myung-hwan	To You Know My Pain (내 아픔 아시는 당신께)	Jo Ha-moon	–
Pair 2	Oh! Korea Will Win	Song Won-geun	Last Love (끝사랑)	Kim Bum-soo	51
Pair 2	Kill Two Birds with One Stone Chess Master	Lee Ki-chan	Last Love (끝사랑)	Kim Bum-soo	48
2nd Song	Kill Two Birds with One Stone Chess Master	Lee Ki-chan	Please Remember (기억해줘)	Lee So-ra	–
Pair 3	Hope to Get Off Work on-time in the Future	Choi Jung-in	Deciding Not to Forget (잊지 말기로 해)	Jang Pil-soon & Kim Hyun-chul	54
Pair 3	That Brother is Going to Be Ginger	Gaeko of Dynamic Duo	Deciding Not to Forget (잊지 말기로 해)	Jang Pil-soon & Kim Hyun-chul	45
2nd Song	That Brother is Going to Be Ginger	Gaeko of Dynamic Duo	Old Love (옛 사랑)	Lee Moon-sae	–
Pair 4	Madam is Shopping	Moon Hee-kyung	Is Anyone There? (누구 없소)	Han Young-ae	37
Pair 4	Take My Sword! Romantic Assassin	Kim Boa of SPICA	Is Anyone There? (누구 없소)	Han Young-ae	62
2nd Song	Madam is Shopping	Moon Hee-kyung	365 Days (365일)	Ali	–

Episode 14

Episode 14 was broadcast on July 5, 2015.

Order	Stage Name	Real Name	Song	Original artist	Vote
Round 2
Pair 1	Young and Sexy Post Box	Lyn	Spring Past (봄날은 간다)	Baek Seol-hee	54
Pair 1	Oh! Korea Will Win	Song Won-geun	Sad Ocean (슬픈 바다)	Jo Jeong-hyun	45
Pair 2	Hope to Get Off Work on-time in the Future	Choi Jung-in	Farewell Taxi (이별택시)	Kim Yeon-woo	43
Pair 2	Take My Sword! Romantic Assassin	Kim Boa of SPICA	Said (...라구요)	Kang San-eh	56
Round 3
Finalists	Young and Sexy Post Box	Lyn	Don't Forget (잊지 말아요)	Baek Ji-young	47
Finalists	Take My Sword! Romantic Assassin	Kim Boa of SPICA	Music is My Life	Lim Jeong-hee	52
Final
Battle	Take My Sword! Romantic Assassin	Kim Boa of SPICA	Previous three songs used as voting standard		15
Battle	CBR Cleopatra	Kim Yeon-woo	The More I Love (사랑할수록)	Boohwal	84

=== 8th Generation Mask King ===
- Contestants : Noh Yoo-min (NRG), Jung Soo-ra, Tei, Kim So-young, Yuju (GFriend), The Name, Lee Jung, Kim Tae-gyun (Cultwo)
Episodes 15 – 16

Episode 15

Episode 15 was broadcast on July 12, 2015. This marks the beginning of the Eighth Generation.

Order	Stage Name	Real Name	Song	Original artist	Vote
Round 1
Pair 1	Innocent Man Was Dumped Today	Noh Yoo-min of NRG	Your Meaning (너의 의미)	Sanulrim	26
Pair 1	Brush Your Teeth Thrice Daily	Jung Soo-ra	Your Meaning (너의 의미)	Sanulrim	73
2nd Song	Innocent Man Was Dumped Today	Noh Yoo-min of NRG	This Song (이 노래)	2AM	–
Pair 2	JAWS Has Appeared	Tei	Safety (안부)	Byul & Na Yoon-kwon	85
Pair 2	Raining in Honam Line	Kim So-young	Safety (안부)	Byul & Na Yoon-kwon	14
2nd Song	Raining in Honam Line	Kim So-young	Musical (뮤지컬)	Sang A Im-Propp	–
Pair 3	Christmas in July	Yuju of GFriend	Without a Heart (심장이 없어)	8Eight	56
Pair 3	Midsummer Night's Beer Party	The Name	Without a Heart (심장이 없어)	8Eight	43
2nd Song	Midsummer Night's Beer Party	The Name	One's Way Back (귀로)	Park Seon-joo	–
Pair 4	King of Song Tungki	Lee Jung	Moonlight by the Window (달빛 창가에서)	City Boys (도시아이들)	75
Pair 4	Cold-blooded Man Cyborg	Kim Tae-gyun of Cultwo	Moonlight by the Window (달빛 창가에서)	City Boys (도시아이들)	24
2nd Song	Cold-blooded Man Cyborg	Kim Tae-gyun of Cultwo	MaMa	Bobby Kim	–

Episode 16

Episode 16 was broadcast on July 19, 2015.

Order	Stage Name	Real Name	Song	Original artist	Vote
Round 2
Pair 1	Brush Your Teeth Thrice Daily	Jung Soo-ra	A Goose's Dream (거위의 꿈)	Carnival	40
Pair 1	JAWS Has Appeared	Tei	Missing You (보고싶다)	Kim Bum-soo	59
Special	Brush Your Teeth Thrice Daily	Jung Soo-ra	Beautiful Country (아름다운 강산)	Lee Sun-hee	–
Pair 2	Christmas in July	Yuju of G-Friend	I Love You (난 널 사랑해)	Shin Hyo-beom	8
Pair 2	King of Song Tungki	Lee Jung	People Who Make Me Sad (나를 슬프게 하는 사람들)	Kim Kyung-ho	91
Round 3
Finalists	JAWS Has Appeared	Tei	Everyone (여러분)	Yoon Bok-hee	38
Finalists	King of Song Tungki	Lee Jung	You in Vague Memory (흐린 기억 속의 그대)	Hyun Jin-young	61
Final
Battle	CBR Cleopatra	Kim Yeon-woo	500 Years of Sorrow (한 오백 년)	Gangwon Province's Arirang	42
Battle	King of Song Tungki	Lee Jung	Previous three songs used as voting standard		57

=== 9th Generation Mask King ===
- Contestants : Kim Min-hee, Im Jae-wook (The Position), Kang Min-kyung (Davichi), Jung Jae-wook, Bae Soo-jeong, Yeoeun (Melody Day), Kim Young-ho, Kang Kyun-sung (Noel)
Episodes 17 – 18

Episode 17

Episode 17 was broadcast on July 26, 2015. This marks the beginning of the Ninth Generation.

Order	Stage Name	Real Name	Song	Original artist	Vote
Opening	CBR Cleopatra	Kim Yeon-woo & Sandeul	Is It Still Beautiful (여전히 아름다운지)	Toy	–
Round 1
Pair 1	Buy Warmly Rice Cake	Kim Min-hee	In the Rain (빗속에서)	Lee Moon-sae	40
Pair 1	Life Go Straight Traffic Lights	Im Jae-wook of The Position	In the Rain (빗속에서)	Lee Moon-sae	59
2nd Song	Buy Warmly Rice Cake	Kim Min-hee	Family Name is Kim (성은 김이요)	Moon Hee-ok	–
Pair 2	Cotton Candy Come for Walk	Kang Min-kyung of Davichi	Some (썸)	Soyou & Junggigo	61
Pair 2	Batteries of Love Died	Jung Jae-wook	Some (썸)	Soyou & Junggigo	38
2nd Song	Batteries of Love Died	Jung Jae-wook	It's too Late (너무 늦었잖아요)	Byun Jin-sub	–
Pair 3	Sweet Bloody Ice Cream	Bae Soo-jeong	Super Star	Jewelry	28
Pair 3	Give a Taste of Spicy Miss Pepper	Yeoeun of Melody Day	Super Star	Jewelry	71
2nd Song	Sweet Bloody Ice Cream	Bae Soo-jeong	Exultation (환희)	Jung Soo-ra	–
Pair 4	Kimsuanmu Turtle and Crane	Kim Young-ho	If You're Like Me (나와 같다면)	Kim Jang-hoon	36
Pair 4	Smiley Face with Watermelon Seeds	Kang Kyun-sung of Noel	If You're Like Me (나와 같다면)	Kim Jang-hoon	63
2nd Song	Kimsuanmu Turtle and Crane	Kim Young-ho	Please Love Her (그녀를 사랑해줘요)	Ha Dong-kyun	–

Episode 18

Episode 18 was broadcast on August 2, 2015.

Order	Stage Name	Real Name	Song	Original artist	Vote
Round 2
Pair 1	Life Go Straight Traffic Lights	Im Jae-wook of The Position	Mona Lisa (모나리자)	Cho Yong-pil	42
Pair 1	Cotton Candy Come for Walk	Kang Min-kyung of Davichi	Like the First Feeling (처음 느낌 그대로)	Lee So-ra	57
Pair 2	Give a Taste of Spicy Miss Pepper	Yeoeun of Melody Day	Love is Gone (사랑이 떠나가네)	Kim Gun-mo	53
Pair 2	Smiley Face with Watermelon Seeds	Kang Kyun-sung of Noel	With My Tears (내 눈물 모아)	Seo Ji-won	46
3rd Song	Smiley Face with Watermelon Seeds	Kang Kyun-sung of Noel	Memory of the Wind (바람기억)	Naul	–
Round 3
Finalists	Cotton Candy Come for Walk	Kang Min-kyung of Davichi	One Late Night in 1994 (1994년 어느 늦은 밤)	Jang Hye-jin	48
Finalists	Give a Taste of Spicy Miss Pepper	Yeoeun of Melody Day	Faraway, My Honey (님은 먼 곳에)	Kim Choo-ja	51
Final
Battle	King of Song Tungki	Lee Jung	I Believe	Lee Soo-young	49
Battle	Give a Taste of Spicy Miss Pepper	Yeoeun of Melody Day	Previous three songs used as voting standard		50

=== 10th Generation Mask King ===
- Contestants : Huh Gong, Lee Sung-kyung, Lee Young-hyun (Big Mama), Hong Ji-min, Alex Chu (Clazziquai Project), Son Dong-woon (Highlight), Kim Seung-mi, Bada Kim
Episodes 19 – 20

Episode 19

Episode 19 was broadcast on August 9, 2015. This marks the beginning of the Tenth Generation.

Order	Stage Name	Real Name	Song	Original artist	Vote
Round 1
Pair 1	Cute Tube Boy	Huh Gong	Nagging (잔소리)	IU & Lim Seul-ong	47
Pair 1	Flower Crab Holding Flowers	Lee Sung-kyung	Nagging (잔소리)	IU & Lim Seul-ong	52
2nd Song	Cute Tube Boy	Huh Gong	Malri Flower (말리꽃)	Lee Seung-chul	–
Pair 2	Singing Triceratops	Lee Young-hyun of Big Mama	Lying on the Sea (바다에 누워)	The Treble Clef	46
Pair 2	Go! Hawaii	Hong Ji-min	Lying on the Sea (바다에 누워)	The Treble Clef	53
2nd Song	Singing Triceratops	Lee Young-hyun of Big Mama	When Flowering Spring Comes (꽃피는 봄이 오면)	BMK	–
Special	Singing Triceratops	Lee Young-hyun of Big Mama	Romantic Cat (낭만 고양이)	Cherry Filter	–
Pair 3	Levitation Hot-Air Balloon	Alex Chu of Clazziquai	Goodbye (잘가요)	Jung Jae-wook	41
Pair 3	Prince Of The Sea	Son Dong-woon of HIGHLIGHT	Goodbye (잘가요)	Jung Jae-wook	58
2nd Song	Levitation Hot-Air Balloon	Alex Chu of Clazziquai	Around Thirty (서른 즈음에)	Kim Kwang-seok	–
Pair 4	A Pear Drops as a Crow Flies from the Tree	Kim Seung-mi	Moon of Seoul (서울의 달)	Kim Gun-mo	72
Pair 4	God of Hairdressing Scissorhands	Bada Kim	Moon of Seoul (서울의 달)	Kim Gun-mo	27
2nd Song	God of Hairdressing Scissorhands	Bada Kim	Crooked (삐딱하게)	G-Dragon	–

Episode 20

Episode 20 was broadcast on August 16, 2015.

Order	Stage Name	Real Name	Song	Original artist	Vote
Round 2
Pair 1	Flower Crab Holding Flowers	Lee Sung-kyung	I Hope It Would Be That Way Now (이젠 그랬으면 좋겠네)	Cho Yong-pil	21
Pair 1	Go! Hawaii	Hong Ji-min	Unreasonable Reason (이유 같지 않은 이유)	Park Mi-kyung	78
3rd Song	Flower Crab Holding Flowers	Lee Sung-kyung	Please Take Care Of Me (잘 부탁드립니다)	EX	–
Pair 2	Prince of the Sea	Son Dong-woon of HIGHLIGHT	I Will Give You It All (다 줄거야)	Jo Gyu-man	48
Pair 2	A Pear Drops as a Crow Flies from the Tree	Kim Seung-mi	The Flight (비상)	Yim Jae-beom	51
Round 3
Finalists	Go! Hawaii	Hong Ji-min	Forever with You (그대와 영원히)	Lee Moon-sae	57
Finalists	A Pear Drops as a Crow Flies from the Tree	Kim Seung-mi	I Still Love You (난 아직도 널)	One Piece	42
Final
Battle	Give a Taste of Spicy Miss Pepper	Yeoeun of Melody Day	As Like Dandelion Spores (민들레 홀씨 되어)	Park Mi-kyung	48
Battle	Go! Hawaii	Hong Ji-min	Previous three songs used as voting standard		51

=== 11th Generation Mask King ===
- Contestants : Mikey (Duble Sidekick), Solar (Mamamoo), Jung Sang-hoon, Chen (EXO), Shin Hyo-beom, Joo Hee (8Eight), Kim Hyung-joong, Jang Ki-ho
Episodes 21 – 22

Episode 21

Episode 21 was broadcast on August 23, 2015. This marks the beginning of the Eleventh Generation.

Order	Stage Name	Real Name	Song	Original artist	Vote
Round 1
Pair 1	This Axe is My Axe	Mikey of Duble Sidekick	Already One Year (벌써 일년)	Brown Eyes	40
Pair 1	Single Hearted Sunflower	Solar of Mamamoo	Already One Year (벌써 일년)	Brown Eyes	59
2nd Song	This Axe is My Axe	Mikey of Duble Sidekick	Holding the End of this Night (이 밤의 끝을 잡고)	Solid	–
Pair 2	Amazing Jack of All Trades	Jung Sang-hoon	A Passionate Goodbye (뜨거운 안녕)	Toy	32
Pair 2	Legendary Guitarman	Chen of EXO	A Passionate Goodbye (뜨거운 안녕)	Toy	67
2nd Song	Amazing Jack of All Trades	Jung Sang-hoon	Bravo My Life	Bom Yeoreum Gaeul Kyeoul	–
Pair 3	Night Blooming Rose	Shin Hyo-beom	Men Came Down from the Sky Like Rain (하늘에서 남자들이 비처럼 내려와)	Bubble Sisters	50
Pair 3	Congratulatory Birthday Cake	Joo Hee of 8Eight	Men Came Down from the Sky Like Rain (하늘에서 남자들이 비처럼 내려와)	Bubble Sisters	49
2nd Song	Congratulatory Birthday Cake	Joo Hee of 8Eight	Father (아버지)	Insooni	–
Pair 4	Light's Warrior Shabang-Stone	Kim Hyung-joong	Becoming Dust (먼지가 되어)	Kim Kwang-seok	56
Pair 4	Mother Father Gentleman	Jang Ki-ho	Becoming Dust (먼지가 되어)	Kim Kwang-seok	43
2nd Song	Mother Father Gentleman	Jang Ki-ho	Remaining (미련)	Kim Gun-mo	–

Episode 22

Episode 22 was broadcast on August 30, 2015.

Order	Stage Name	Real Name	Song	Original artist	Vote
Round 2
Pair 1	Single Hearted Sunflower	Solar of Mamamoo	I'll Give the Love That Stays with Me (내게 남은 사랑을 드릴게요)	Jang Hye-ri	28
Pair 1	Legendary Guitarman	Chen of EXO	Stained (물들어)	BMK	71
Pair 2	Night Blooming Rose	Shin Hyo-beom	Again (또)	Insooni	52
Pair 2	Light's Warrior Shabang-Stone	Kim Hyung-joong	A Thousand Days (천일 동안)	Lee Seung-hwan	47
Round 3
Finalists	Legendary Guitarman	Chen of EXO	Drunken Truth (취중진담)	Exhibition	51
Finalists	Night Blooming Rose	Shin Hyo-beom	Drinking (술이야)	Vibe	48
Final
Battle	Legendary Guitarman	Chen of EXO	Previous three songs used as voting standard		35
Battle	Go! Hawaii	Hong Ji-min	Invitation for Me (나에게로의 초대)	Jung Kyung-hwa	64

=== 12th Generation Mask King ===
- Contestants : Seo Young-eun, Kim Dong-wook, Lim Hyung-joo, Kim Young-chul, Seo Doo-won, Sonya, Sungtae (Postmen), Jung Yu-ji (Bestie)
Episodes 23 – 24

Episode 23

Episode 23 was broadcast on September 6, 2015. This marks the beginning of the Twelfth Generation.

Order	Stage Name	Real Name	Song	Original artist	Vote
Round 1
Pair 1	Jeweler's Butterfly Wife	Seo Young-eun	Be Happy	Jung Tae-woo & Jang Na-ra	52
Pair 1	Ascending Performer Clown	Kim Dong-wook	Be Happy	Jung Tae-woo & Jang Na-ra	47
2nd Song	Ascending Performer Clown	Kim Dong-wook	With a Heart That Should Forget (잊어야 한다는 마음으로)	Kim Kwang-seok	–
Pair 2	Real Man Tough Guy	Lim Hyung-joo	By Your Side (너의 곁으로)	Jo Sung-mo	85
Pair 2	Pythagorean Theorem	Kim Young-chul	By Your Side (너의 곁으로)	Jo Sung-mo	14
2nd Song	Pythagorean Theorem	Kim Young-chul	Into The Army in the Train (입영열차 안에서)	Kim Min-woo	–
Pair 3	We Found our Sound	Seo Doo-won	White Winter (하얀 겨울)	Mr. 2	36
Pair 3	Love Write in Pencil	Sonya	White Winter (하얀 겨울)	Mr. 2	63
2nd Song	We Found our Sound	Seo Doo-won	Miss, Miss And Miss (그립고 그립고 그립다)	K.Will	–
Pair 4	Soori Soori Masoori	Sungtae of Postmen	Breath (숨소리)	SM the Ballad (Taeyeon & Jonghyun)	49
Pair 4	I Love Coffee	UJi of BESTie	Breath (숨소리)	SM the Ballad (Taeyeon & Jonghyun)	50
2nd Song	Soori Soori Masoori	Sungtae of Postmen	Good Person (좋은 사람)	Park Hyo-shin	–

Episode 24

Episode 24 was broadcast on September 13, 2015.

Order	Stage Name	Real Name	Song	Original artist	Vote
Round 2
Pair 1	Jeweler's Butterfly Wife	Seo Young-eun	Facing the Desolate Love (사랑 그 쓸쓸함에 대하여)	Yang Hee-eun	43
Pair 1	Real Man Tough Guy	Lim Hyung-joo	Invisible Love (보이지 않는 사랑)	Shin Seung-hun	56
Pair 2	Love Write in Pencil	Sonya	Azalea (진달래꽃)	Maya	54
Pair 2	I Love Coffee	UJi of BESTie	Memory Loss (기억상실)	Gummy	45
Round 3
Finalists	Real Man Tough Guy	Lim Hyung-joo	Death Song (사의 찬미)	Yun Sim-deok	40
Finalists	Love Write in Pencil	Sonya	Rain in Glass Window (유리창엔 비)	The Sunlight Village (햇빛촌)	59
Final
Battle	Go! Hawaii	Hong Ji-min	As I Say (말하는 대로)	Sagging Snail (Yoo Jae-suk & Lee Juck)	42
Battle	Love Write in Pencil	Sonya	Previous three songs used as voting standard		57

=== Special Live 2015: Your Choice! King of Mask Singer ===
- Contestants : Kim Boa (Spica), Kim Ye-won, Yook Sung-jae (BtoB), Jang Hye-jin, Na Yoon-kwon, Baek Chung-kang, Jo Jang-hyuk, Bae Da-hae
Special Live 2015

The special live broadcast aired on September 11, 2015, as part of the DMC Festival. This was a special edition that brought back contestants that had been eliminated in previous episodes, and a special Mask King was chosen from live voting (in 3 minutes after each pair's performance). Jo Jang-hyuk was able to perform as a challenger in Episode 34.

Order	Stage Name	Real Name	Song	Original artist	Vote Ratio
Opening	Sangam-dong Jaw Stone	Kim Gu-ra	Show	Kim Won-jun	–
Opening	Only Call Juseyong	Kim Sung-joo	Show	Kim Won-jun	–
Round 1
Pair 1	Sweet Voice is So Sweet	Kim Boa of SPICA	Dancing Queen (Korean version)	ABBA	62%
Pair 1	The High Notes in My Mind	Kim Ye-won	Dancing Queen (Korean version)	ABBA	38%
2nd Song	The High Notes in My Mind	Kim Ye-won	Honey	Park Jin-young	–
Pair 2	LP Boy	Yook Sungjae of BtoB	Even Though the Heart Hurts (가슴 아파도)	Fly to the Sky	64% (9458)
Pair 2	Unresponsive Mirror Princess	Jang Hye-jin	Even Though the Heart Hurts (가슴 아파도)	Fly to the Sky	36% (5512)
2nd Song	LP Boy**	Yook Sungjae of BtoB	Replay	Kim Dong-ryul	–
Pair 3	My Song Makes Women Cry	Na Yoon-kwon	Flying Deep in the Night (깊은 밤을 날아서)	Lee Moon-sae	45%
Pair 3	Army Sergeant Napoleon	Baek Chung-kang	Flying Deep in the Night (깊은 밤을 날아서)	Lee Moon-sae	55%
2nd Song	My Song Makes Women Cry	Na Yoon-kwon	Nothing Better	Jungyup	–
Pair 4	Sensitivity Vocal Cricket	Jo Jang-hyuk	Only Love (사랑일 뿐야)	Kim Min-woo	74% (8426)
Pair 4	Ambivalent Heart Of A Reed	Bae Da-hae	Only Love (사랑일 뿐야)	Kim Min-woo	26% (2975)
2nd Song	Ambivalent Heart Of A Reed	Bae Da-hae	Good Day (좋은 날)	IU	–
2nd Song	Unresponsive Mirror Princess**	Jang Hye-jin	Even If You Get Cheated by World (세상이 그대를 속일지라도)	Kim Jang-hoon	–
Round 2
Pair 1	Sweet Voice is So Sweet	Kim Boa of SPICA	You Let Me Go with a Smile (미소를 띄우며 나를 보낸 그 모습처럼)	Lee Eun-ha	**
Pair 1	LP Boy**	Yook Sungjae of BtoB	To You (그대에게)	Caterpillar	**
Pair 2	Army Sergeant Napoleon	Baek Chung-kang	Tears	So Chan-whee	7140
Pair 2	Sensitivity Vocal Cricket	Jo Jang-hyuk	Sad Love (비련)	Cho Yong-pil	10782
**Yook Sungjae was initially eliminated and identity revealed by accident due to a mistake in the counting of live votes from the first round, he performed his third song (which was prepared for the final round) for the second round's competition but then decided to drop out (before MC publish the voting result of the second round's first pair) to ensure a fair competition. "Sweet Voice is So Sweet" was thus able to advance.
Battle
Finalists	Sweet Voice is So Sweet	Kim Boa of SPICA	To You Again (너에게로 또 다시)	Byun Jin-sub	19%
Finalists	Sensitivity Vocal Cricket	Jo Jang-hyuk	My Love by My Side (내 사랑 내 곁에)	Kim Hyun-sik	81%

=== 13th Generation Mask King ===
- Contestants : Sung Ji-ru, Lee Seok-hoon (SG Wannabe), Byul, Choa (AOA), Choi Jin-hee, Kim Seung-jin, Gummy, Simon Dominic
Episodes 25 – 26

Episode 25

Episode 25 was broadcast on September 20, 2015. This marks the beginning of the Thirteenth Generation.

Order	Stage Name	Real Name	Song	Original artist	Vote
Round 1
Pair 1	Pirate of the Caribbean	Sung Ji-ru	I'm Going Out (나도야 간다)	Kim Soo-chul	32
Pair 1	Bright Full Moon	Lee Seok-hoon of SG Wannabe	I'm Going Out (나도야 간다)	Kim Soo-chul	67
2nd Song	Pirate of the Caribbean	Sung Ji-ru	After the Love Has Gone (사랑한 후에)	Deulgukhwa	–
Pair 2	Wear Lipstick Heavily	Byul	Happy Me (행복한 나를)	Eco	49
Pair 2	Omae, Full Autumn Foliage	Choa of AOA	Happy Me (행복한 나를)	Eco	50
2nd Song	Wear Lipstick Heavily	Byul	Like an Indian Doll (인디언 인형처럼)	Na-mi	–
Pair 3	Red Dragonfly	Choi Jin-hee	Desert Island (무인도)	Kim Choo-ja	51
Pair 3	Golden Bat	Kim Seung-jin	Desert Island (무인도)	Kim Choo-ja	48
2nd Song	Golden Bat	Kim Seung-jin	An Essay of Memory (기억의 습작)	Kim Dong-ryul	–
Pair 4	Young and Innocent Cosmos	Gummy	Because It's You (그대니까요)	Kim Hyun-chul & Cha Eun-joo (차은주)	60
Pair 4	Fashion People Scarecrow	Simon Dominic	Because It's You (그대니까요)	Kim Hyun-chul & Cha Eun-joo (차은주)	39
2nd Song	Fashion People Scarecrow	Simon Dominic	Telepathy (텔레파시)	City Boys (도시아이들)	–
Special	Fashion People Scarecrow	Simon Dominic	After Send You (너를 보내고)	YB	–

Episode 26

Episode 26 was broadcast on September 27, 2015.

Order	Stage Name	Real Name	Song	Original artist	Vote
Round 2
Pair 1	Bright Full Moon	Lee Seok-hoon of SG Wannabe	You Are Just at a Place Higher Than Me (나보다 조금 높은 곳에 니가 있을 뿐)	Shin Seung-hun	68
Pair 1	Omae, Full Autumn Foliage	Choa of AOA	Beautiful Restriction (아름다운 구속)	Kim Jong-seo	31
Pair 2	Red Dragonfly	Choi Jin-hee	One Million Roses (백만송이 장미)	Sim Soo-bong	34
Pair 2	Young and Innocent Cosmos	Gummy	Somebody's Dream (어떤 이의 꿈)	Bom Yeoreum Gaeul Kyeoul	65
Round 3
Finalists	Bright Full Moon	Lee Seok-hoon of SG Wannabe	Into Memory (기억 속으로)	Lee Eun-mi	32
Finalists	Young and Innocent Cosmos	Gummy	Yanghwa BRDG (양화대교)	Zion.T	67
Final
Battle	Love Write in Pencil	Sonya	Resignation (체념)	Lee Young-hyun	31
Battle	Young and Innocent Cosmos	Gummy	Previous three songs used as voting standard		68

=== 14th Generation Mask King ===
- Contestants : Jeon Bong-jin, Bae Ki-sung (Can), Wax, Lee Chang-sub (BtoB), Park Jung-ah (Jewelry), Cheetah, Lee Jae-eun, Muzie
Episodes 27 – 28

Episode 27

Episode 27 was broadcast on October 4, 2015. This marks the beginning of the Fourteenth Generation.

Order	Stage Name	Real Name	Song	Original artist	Vote
Round 1
Pair 1	Small Snoring Tiger	Jeon Bong-jin	Want and Resent (원하고 원망하죠)	As One	60
Pair 1	Season of High Sky and Plump Horses	Bae Ki-sung of CAN	Want and Resent (원하고 원망하죠)	As One	39
2nd Song	Season of High Sky and Plump Horses	Bae Ki-sung of CAN	Don't Be Sad (슬픈 표정 하지 말아요)	Shin Hae-chul	–
Pair 2	Today I Caught Persimmons	Wax	Between Love and Friendship (사랑과 우정 사이)	Pinocchio (피노키오)	40
Pair 2	Well-Popped Wi-Fi	Lee Changsub of BtoB	Between Love and Friendship (사랑과 우정 사이)	Pinocchio (피노키오)	59
2nd Song	Today I Caught Persimmons	Wax	The Covered Up Road (가리워진 길)	Yoo Jae-ha	–
Pair 3	Stop Moving!	Park Jung-ah of Jewelry	Magic Carpet Ride (매직 카펫 라이드)	Jaurim	52
Pair 3	Naratmalssami	Cheetah	Magic Carpet Ride (매직 카펫 라이드)	Jaurim	47
2nd Song	Naratmalssami	Cheetah	Side Road (골목길)	Shinchon Blues	–
Special	Naratmalssami	Cheetah	The Practical Usage of Sadness (슬픔 활용법)	Kim Bum-soo	–
Pair 4	One Season's Grasshopper	Lee Jae-eun	Miracle (기적)	Kim Dong-ryool & Lee So-eun	5
Pair 4	Our Unbeatable Friend Taekwon V	Muzie	Miracle (기적)	Kim Dong-ryool & Lee So-eun	94
2nd Song	One Season's Grasshopper	Lee Jae-eun	Flower (꽃)	Jang Yoon-jeong	–

Episode 28

Episode 28 was broadcast on October 11, 2015.

Order	Stage Name	Real Name	Song	Original artist	Vote
Round 2
Pair 1	Small Snoring Tiger	Jeon Bong-jin	Yearning (동경)	Park Hyo-shin	54
Pair 1	Well-Popped Wi-Fi	Lee Changsub of BtoB	You Inside My Memories (추억 속의 그대)	Hwang Ji-hoon	45
Pair 2	Stop Moving!	Park Jung-ah of Jewelry	Rhinoceros (코뿔소)	Han Young-ae	37
Pair 2	Our Unbeatable Friend Taekwon V	Muzie	I Didn't Know That Time (그 땐 미처 알지 못했지)	Lee Juck	62
Round 3
Finalists	Small Snoring Tiger	Jeon Bong-jin	You Also Leave (그대 떠나가도)	Jo Jang-hyuk	44
Finalists	Our Unbeatable Friend Taekwon V	Muzie	I'm Happy (난 행복해)	Lee So-ra	55
Final
Battle	Our Unbeatable Friend Taekwon V	Muzie	Previous three songs used as voting standard		21
Battle	Young and Innocent Cosmos	Gummy	Girls' Generation (소녀시대)	Lee Seung-chul	78

=== 15th Generation Mask King ===
- Contestants : Kim Dong-wan (Shinhwa), Chunja, Lee Jeong-bong, Kim Hyun-wook, Gong Hyung-jin, Cho Kyu-hyun (Super Junior), Eun Ga-eun, Park Ji-yoon
Episodes 29 – 30

Episode 29

Episode 29 was broadcast on October 18, 2015. This marks the beginning of the Fifteenth Generation.

Order	Stage Name	Real Name	Song	Original artist	Vote
Round 1
Pair 1	Holding the End of This Chestnut	Kim Dong-wan of Shinhwa	Some Day (언젠가는)	Lee Tzsche	58
Pair 1	Write a Letter to the Autumn Sky	Chunja	Some Day (언젠가는)	Lee Tzsche	41
2nd Song	Write a Letter to the Autumn Sky	Chunja	Love Love Love (사랑 사랑 사랑)	Kim Hyun-sik	–
Pair 2	Ninon Maximus Sonhador Sparta	Lee Jeong-bong	Love, At First (처음엔 사랑이란 게)	Busker Busker	65
Pair 2	Sun's Son Circus Man	Kim Hyun-wook	Love, At First (처음엔 사랑이란 게)	Busker Busker	34
2nd Song	Sun's Son Circus Man	Kim Hyun-wook	Dunk Shot (덩크 슛)	Lee Seung-hwan	–
Pair 3	Merchant in Venice	Gong Hyung-jin	Blissful Confession (황홀한 고백)	Yoon Soo-il	23
Pair 3	Detective Cough	Cho Kyuhyun of Super Junior	Blissful Confession (황홀한 고백)	Yoon Soo-il	76
2nd Song	Merchant in Venice	Gong Hyung-jin	Station Of Farewell (이별의 종착역)	Son Si-hyang (손시향)	–
Pair 4	Little Wizard Abracadabra	Eun Ga-eun	Fool (바보)	Park Hyo-shin	57
Pair 4	Coy Hundred Steps Pumpkin Seed	Park Ji-yoon	Fool (바보)	Park Hyo-shin	42
2nd Song	Coy Hundred Steps Pumpkin Seed	Park Ji-yoon	Beautiful Days (아름다운 날들)	Jang Hye-jin	–

Episode 30

Episode 30 was broadcast on October 25, 2015.

Order	Stage Name	Real Name	Song	Original artist	Vote
Round 2
Pair 1	Holding the End of This Chestnut	Kim Dong-wan of Shinhwa	The First Poem (서시)	Shin Sung-woo	28
Pair 1	Ninon Maximus Sonhador Sparta	Lee Jeong-bong	Please (제발)	Lee So-ra	71
Pair 2	Detective Cough	Cho Kyuhyun of Super Junior	Stranger (이방인)	Exhibition	40
Pair 2	Little Wizard Abracadabra	Eun Ga-eun	To Her (그대에게)	Shin Hae-chul	59
Special	Detective Cough	Cho Kyuhyun of Super Junior	Wild Flower (야생화)	Park Hyo-shin	–
Round 3
Finalists	Ninon Maximus Sonhador Sparta	Lee Jeong-bong	Swamp (늪)	Jo Kwan-woo	39
Finalists	Little Wizard Abracadabra	Eun Ga-eun	Turning the Pages of Memories (추억의 책장을 넘기면)	Lee Sun-hee	60
Final
Battle	Little Wizard Abracadabra	Eun Ga-eun	Previous three songs used as voting standard		18
Battle	Young and Innocent Cosmos	Gummy	Beautiful Goodbye (아름다운 이별)	Kim Gun-mo	81

=== 16th Generation Mask King ===
- Contestants : Kim Sung-myun, Kim Jung-min, Park Seul-gi, Dami Im, Hong Jin-young, Seunghee (Oh My Girl), Lee Hyun (8Eight/Homme), Song Pil-geun
Episodes 31 – 32

Episode 31

Episode 31 was broadcast on November 1, 2015. This marks the beginning of the Sixteenth Generation.

Order	Stage Name	Real Name	Song	Original artist	Vote
Round 1
Pair 1	Wolmido Island Viking	Kim Sung-myun	Watercolor of a Rainy Day (비 오는 날 수채화)	Kang In-won & Kwon In-ha & Kim Hyun-sik	43
Pair 1	Asleep or Awake, Safety First	Kim Jung-min	Watercolor of a Rainy Day (비 오는 날 수채화)	Kang In-won & Kwon In-ha & Kim Hyun-sik	56
2nd Song	Wolmido Island Viking	Kim Sung-myun	The Woman Outside the Window (창 밖의 여자)	Cho Yong-pil	–
Pair 2	Nasty Person Bulldog Girl	Park Seul-gi	All You Need is Love (사미인곡)	Seomoon Tak	34
Pair 2	Statue of Liberty	Dami Im	All You Need is Love (사미인곡)	Seomoon Tak	65
2nd Song	Nasty Person Bulldog Girl	Park Seul-gi	December 32 (12월 32일)	Byul	–
Pair 3	Taoist Hermit Medicinal Herb Gingko Leaf	Hong Jin-young	Star (별)	Yoo Mi	60
Pair 3	My Color Television	Seunghee of Oh My Girl	Star (별)	Yoo Mi	39
2nd Song	My Color Television	Seunghee of Oh My Girl	Whale Hunting (고래 사냥)	Song Chang-sik	–
Pair 4	Come Out, Your Majesty!	Lee Hyun of 8Eight/Homme	Will You Marry Me? (결혼해 줄래)	Lee Seung-gi	57
Pair 4	Vampire Poisoned with Garlic	Song Pil-geun	Will You Marry Me? (결혼해 줄래)	Lee Seung-gi	42
2nd Song	Vampire Poisoned with Garlic	Song Pil-geun	I Even Thought of Marriage (결혼까지 생각했어)	Wheesung	–

Episode 32

Episode 32 was broadcast on November 8, 2015.

Order	Stage Name	Real Name	Song	Original artist	Vote
Round 2
Pair 1	Asleep or Awake, Safety First	Kim Jung-min	Even Loved the Pain (그 아픔까지 사랑한거야)	Jo Jeong-hyun	16
Pair 1	Statue of Liberty	Dami Im	Never Ending Story	Lee Seung-chul	83
Pair 2	Taoist Hermit Medicinal Herb Gingko Leaf	Hong Jin-young	Legends of the Fall (가을의 전설)	Bank	41
Pair 2	Come Out, Your Majesty	Lee Hyun of 8Eight/Homme	Dream (꿈)	Cho Yong-pil	58
3rd Song	Taoist Hermit Medicinal Herb Gingko Leaf	Hong Jin-young	Letter of a Private (이등병의 편지)	Kim Kwang-seok	–
Round 3
Finalists	Statue of Liberty	Dami Im	Snow Flower (눈의 꽃)	Park Hyo-shin	44
Finalists	Come Out, Your Majesty	Lee Hyun of 8Eight/Homme	Although I Loved You (사랑했지만)	Kim Kwang-seok	55
Final
Battle	Come Out, Your Majesty	Lee Hyun of 8Eight/Homme	Previous three songs used as voting standard		24
Battle	Young and Innocent Cosmos	Gummy	A Person in My Dream (몽중인)	Lena Park	75

=== 17th Generation Mask King ===
- Contestants : Lee Young-jin, Raina (After School/Orange Caramel), Younha, Jo Bin (Norazo), Kim Jung-tae, Daehyun (B.A.P), Cha Ji-yeon, Hyun Jin-young
Episodes 33 – 34

Episode 33

Episode 33 was broadcast on November 15, 2015. This marks the beginning of the Seventeenth Generation.

Order	Stage Name	Real Name	Song	Original artist	Vote
Round 1
Pair 1	Candy in My Ear	Lee Young-jin	Hey Hey Hey	Jaurim	39
Pair 1	Top of the World	Raina of After School/Orange Caramel	Hey Hey Hey	Jaurim	62
2nd Song	Candy in My Ear	Lee Young-jin	Jazz Cafe (재즈 카페)	Shin Hae-chul	–
Pair 2	Rainbow Romance	Younha	Like a Star (별처럼)	The One & Taeyeon	78
Pair 2	Oppa Run Motorcycle! Honk Honk	Jo Bin of Norazo	Like a Star (별처럼)	The One & Taeyeon	23
2nd Song	Oppa Run Motorcycle! Honk Honk	Jo Bin of Norazo	Our Night is More Beautiful Than Your Day (우리의 밤은 당신의 낮보다 아름답다)	Kona (코나)	–
Pair 3	Wandering Poet Kim Sattgat	Kim Jung-tae	One More Time (한 번만 더)	Park Sung-shin	50
Pair 3	Hitmaker Freshman	Daehyun of B.A.P	One More Time (한 번만 더)	Park Sung-shin	51
2nd Song	Wandering Poet Kim Sattgat	Kim Jung-tae	My Love too Far to Have Near (가까이하기엔 너무 먼 당신)	Lee Kwang-jo	–
Pair 4	Amazon Cat-Girl	Cha Ji-yeon	Sano Ramen (사노라면)	Johnny Lee	61
Pair 4	Check Again, Extinguish the Fire 119	Hyun Jin-young	Sano Ramen (사노라면)	Johnny Lee	40
2nd Song	Check Again, Extinguish the Fire 119	Hyun Jin-young	Letter (편지)	Kim Kwang-jin	–

Episode 34

Episode 34 was broadcast on November 22, 2015. "Sensitivity Vocal Cricket", who was Mask King of the special live broadcast (aired September 11, 2015), participated in the final battle with the Sixteenth Generation Mask King and the Challenger.

Order	Stage Name	Real Name	Song	Original artist	Vote
Round 2
Pair 1	Top of the World	Raina of After School/Orange Caramel	Forgotten Season (잊혀진 계절)	Lee Yong	46
Pair 1	Rainbow Romance	Younha	Grasshopper's Love (애송이의 사랑)	Yangpa	55
Pair 2	Hitmaker Freshman	Daehyun of B.A.P	Empty Glass (빈 잔)	Nam Jin	16
Pair 2	Amazon Cat-Girl	Cha Ji-yeon	Run Devil Run	Girls' Generation	85
Round 3
Finalists	Rainbow Romance	Younha	Come Back Home	2NE1	29
Finalists	Amazon Cat-Girl	Cha Ji-yeon	Alone (홀로)	Jung Key & Kim Na-young	72
Final
Battle	Sensitivity Vocal Cricket	Jo Jang-hyuk	Rain and You (비와 당신)	Park Joong-hoon	29
Battle	Young and Innocent Cosmos	Gummy	In My Dream (꿈에)	Jo Deok-bae	32
Battle	Amazon Cat-Girl	Cha Ji-yeon	Previous three songs used as voting standard		40

=== 18th Generation Mask King ===
- Contestants : Kim Jin-soo, Lee Seon, Kim Hyung-beom, Oh Jong-hyuk (Click-B), Jessi, Minah (Girl's Day), Kim Ji-hwan (2BiC), Lee Beom-hak
Episodes 35 – 36

Episode 35

Episode 35 was broadcast on November 29, 2015. This marks the beginning of the Eighteenth Generation.

Order	Stage Name	Real Name	Song	Original artist	Vote
Round 1
Pair 1	Sad Pharaoh	Kim Jin-soo	For Couples Just Begun (시작되는 연인들을 위해)	Lee Won-jin & Ryu Geum-deok (류금덕)	56
Pair 1	Ahromi	Lee Seon	For Couples Just Begun (시작되는 연인들을 위해)	Lee Won-jin & Ryu Geum-deok (류금덕)	43
2nd Song	Ahromi	Lee Seon	Sorry, I Hate You (미안해 널 미워해)	Jaurim	–
Pair 2	Maracas Muchacho Kim Sato	Kim Hyung-beom	An Outsider (아웃사이더)	Bom Yeoreum Gaeul Kyeoul	18
Pair 2	Lonely Man Leon	Oh Jong-hyuk of Click-B	An Outsider (아웃사이더)	Bom Yeoreum Gaeul Kyeoul	81
2nd Song	Maracas Muchacho Kim Sato	Kim Hyung-beom	Christmas in August OST (8월의 크리스마스)	Han Suk-kyu	–
Pair 3	Miss Korea	Jessi	Warning of the Eve (이브의 경고)	Park Mi-kyung	31
Pair 3	Countess Victorian	Minah of Girl's Day	Warning of the Eve (이브의 경고)	Park Mi-kyung	68
2nd Song	Miss Korea	Jessi	Sea of Love	Fly to the Sky	–
Pair 4	Penguin Man	Kim Ji-hwan of 2BiC	Even Though My Heart Aches (가슴 아파도)	Fly to the Sky	64
Pair 4	Imprisoned Papillon	Lee Beom-hak	Even Though My Heart Aches (가슴 아파도)	Fly to the Sky	35
2nd Song	Imprisoned Papillon	Lee Beom-hak	The Pierrot Laughs at Us (삐에로는 우릴 보고 웃지)	Kim Wan-sun	–

Episode 36

Episode 36 was broadcast on December 6, 2015.

Order	Stage Name	Real Name	Song	Original artist	Vote
Round 2
Pair 1	Sad Pharaoh	Kim Jin-soo	Even If You Get Cheated by World (세상이 그대를 속일지라도)	Kim Jang-hoon	29
Pair 1	Lonely Man Leon	Oh Jong-hyuk of Click-B	Left-handed (왼손잡이)	Panic	70
Pair 2	Countess Victorian	Minah of Girl's Day	How Are You (어떤가요)	Lee Jeong-bong	26
Pair 2	Penguin Man	Kim Ji-hwan of 2BiC	On the Street (거리에서)	Dongmulwon	73
Round 3
Finalists	Lonely Man Leon	Oh Jong-hyuk of Click-B	Winter Rain (겨울비)	Kim Jong-seo	30
Finalists	Penguin Man	Kim Ji-hwan of 2BiC	Plastic Syndrome (플라스틱 신드롬)	Kim Jong-seo	69
Final
Battle	Penguin Man	Kim Ji-hwan of 2BiC	Previous three songs used as voting standard		11
Battle	Amazon Cat-Girl	Cha Ji-yeon	Love over Thousand Years (천년의 사랑)	Park Wan-kyu	88

=== 19th Generation Mask King ===
- Contestants : Lee Soo-young, Chae Yeon, G.O (MBLAQ), Kangnam (M.I.B), Yoonhan, Jo Jung-min, Lee Chun-soo, Lee Ji-hoon
Episodes 37 – 38

Episode 37

Episode 37 was broadcast on December 13, 2015. This marks the beginning of the Nineteenth Generation.

Order	Stage Name	Real Name	Song	Original artist	Vote
Round 1
Pair 1	The Goddess of Beauty Aphrodite Playing a Harp	Lee Soo-young	A Wedding Proposal (청혼)	Lee So-ra	59
Pair 1	The Flamboyant Duchess Miss Peacock	Chae Yeon	A Wedding Proposal (청혼)	Lee So-ra	40
2nd Song	The Flamboyant Duchess Miss Peacock	Chae Yeon	As Time Goes By (세월이 가면)	Choi Ho-seop (최호섭)	–
Pair 2	Dad Bought Bungeoppang	G.O of MBLAQ	Spring Days of My Life (내 생에 봄날은)	Can	52
Pair 2	Musical Prodigy Conductor Mozart	Kangnam of M.I.B	Spring Days of My Life (내 생에 봄날은)	Can	47
2nd Song	Musical Prodigy Conductor Mozart	Kangnam of M.I.B	Beautiful Pain (아름다운 아픔)	Kim Min-jong	–
Special	Musical Prodigy Conductor Mozart	Kangnam of M.I.B	Let's Go Travel (여행을 떠나요)	Cho Yong-pil	–
Pair 3	Good Friend Santa Claus	Yoonhan	Grabber (욕심쟁이)	Kim Dong-ryul & Lee So-eun	48
Pair 3	Glamor Girl Rudolph	Jo Jung-min	Grabber (욕심쟁이)	Kim Dong-ryul & Lee So-eun	51
2nd Song	Good Friend Santa Claus	Yoonhan	I Want to Fall in Love (사랑에 빠지고 싶다)	Kim Jo-han	–
Pair 4	Know Thyself Socrates	Lee Chun-soo	With You (그대와 함께)	The Blue	19
Pair 4	Follow Me Admiral Kim	Lee Ji-hoon	With You (그대와 함께)	The Blue	80
2nd Song	Know Thyself Socrates	Lee Chun-soo	You in My Arms (그대 내 품에)	Yoo Jae-ha	–

Episode 38

Episode 38 was broadcast on December 20, 2015.

Order	Stage Name	Real Name	Song	Original artist	Vote
Round 2
Pair 1	The Goddess of Beauty Aphrodite Playing a Harp	Lee Soo-young	Dear Love (사랑아)	The One	41
Pair 1	Dad Bought Bungeoppang	G.O of MBLAQ	Ode to Gwanghwamun (광화문 연가)	Lee Moon-sae	58
Pair 2	Glamor Girl Rudolph	Jo Jung-min	Please Don't Leave Me (날 떠나지 마)	Park Jin-young	38
Pair 2	Follow Me Admiral Kim	Lee Ji-hoon	Sorry (미안해요)	Kim Gun-mo	61
Round 3
Finalists	Dad Bought Bungeoppang	G.O of MBLAQ	For You (너를 위해)	Yim Jae-beom	19
Finalists	Follow Me Admiral Kim	Lee Ji-hoon	Forbidden Love (금지된 사랑)	Kim Kyung-ho	80
Final
Battle	Follow Me Admiral Kim	Lee Ji-hoon	Previous three songs used as voting standard		34
Battle	Amazon Cat-Girl	Cha Ji-yeon	Lady at the Cigarette Shop (담배 가게 아가씨)	Song Chang-sik	65

=== 20th Generation Mask King ===
- Contestants : Lim Jeong-hee, Jo Hye-ryun, Kim Nam-joo (Apink), Kihyun (Monsta X), Lee Pil-mo, Kim Tae-won, Im Baek-cheon, Jeon Woo-sung (Noel)
Episode 39

Episode 39 was broadcast on December 27, 2015. This marks the beginning of the Twentieth Generation.

Order	Stage Name	Real Name	Song	Original artist	Vote
Round 1
Pair 1	Rolled Up Good Fortune	Lim Jeong-hee	Like That Smiling Face Letting Me Go (Don't Cry for Me) (미소를 띄우며 나를 보낸 그 모습처럼)	Lee Eun-ha	95
Pair 1	Frozen Ice Princess	Jo Hye-ryun	Like That Smiling Face Letting Me Go (Don't Cry for Me) (미소를 띄우며 나를 보낸 그 모습처럼)	Lee Eun-ha	4
2nd Song	Frozen Ice Princess	Jo Hye-ryun	Reminiscence (회상)	Sanulrim	–
Pair 2	Good Daughter Singer Simcheong	Kim Nam-joo of Apink	Must Have Love	Brown Eyed Girls & SG Wannabe	36
Pair 2	Tell Them I'm the Dragon King	Kihyun of Monsta X	Must Have Love	Brown Eyed Girls & SG Wannabe	63
2nd Song	Good Daughter Singer Simcheong	Kim Nam-joo of Apink	When It Rains on Tuesdays (화요일에 비가 내리면)	Park Mi-kyung	–
Pair 3	Blingbling! Happy New Year	Lee Pil-mo	This is the Moment (지금 이 순간)	Musical "Jekyll and Hyde" OST	46
Pair 3	Adonis Snowman	Kim Tae-won	This is the Moment (지금 이 순간)	Musical "Jekyll and Hyde" OST	53
2nd Song	Blingbling! Happy New Year	Lee Pil-mo	Pine Tree (소나무)	Bobby Kim	–
Pair 4	For Whom the Favorable Bell Tolls	Im Baek-cheon	Let's Go Travel (여행을 떠나요)	Cho Yong-pil	28
Pair 4	Invincible Bangpai-kite Shield	Jeon Woo-sung of Noel	Let's Go Travel (여행을 떠나요)	Cho Yong-pil	71
2nd Song	For Whom the Favorable Bell Tolls	Im Baek-cheon	People Are More Beautiful Than Flowers (사람이 꽃보다 아름다워)	An Chi-hwan	–

== Special releases ==
=== Digital single ===
No.	Title	Singer	Length
1.	"미소를 띄우며 나를 보낸 그 모습처럼 Don't Cry For Me" (Original: Lee Eun-ha)	Luna (Used two buckets of gold lacquer)	03:40

=== Special album ===
No.	Title	Singer	Length
1.	"너만을 느끼며 Feeling Only You" (Original: The Blue)	Hong Seok-cheon (Hardware store boss Kim) and Taeil (Sangamdong Whistle)	04:02
2.	"보여줄게 I Will Show You" (Original: Ailee)	Jinju (Jingle Jingle Lark)	03:52
3.	"바람이 분다 Wind is Blowing" (Original: Lee So-ra)	Jinju	04:17
4.	"발걸음 Footsteps" (Original: Emerald Castle)	Lee Jong-won (Help! Silverman)	04:01
5.	"사랑은 창 밖에 빗물 같아요 Love is Rainwater Outside the Window" (Original: Yang Soo-kyung)	Song Ji-eun (I'm happy because of rabbits)	03:12
6.	"이별이야기 Farewell Story" (Original: Lee Moon-sae and Go Eun-hee)	Park Hak-ki and Song Ji-eun	03:21
7.	"가시나무 Thorn Tree" (Original: Jo Sung-mo)	Park Hak-ki (Dream of Deviant Cabbage Ascetic)	03:57
8.	"1월부터 6월까지 From January to June" (Original: 015B feat. Yoon Jong-shin)	Jang Hye Jin (Elegant Plaster Madam)	04:30
9.	"니가 있어야 할 곳 Place Where You Need To Be" (Original: g.o.d)	Lee Changmin (That Pine on Namsan)	03:08
10.	"응급실 Emergency Room" (Original: izi)	Sandeul (Flowering Silky Fowl)	04:07
