= 2010 Idol Star Athletics Championships =

The 2010 Idol Star Championships in Athletics (Korean: 아이돌스타 육상 선수권 대회) was held at Mokdong Stadium in Seoul, South Korea on September 14, 2010 and was broadcast on MBC from September 25 to 26, 2010. At the championships a total number of 10 events in athletics were contested: 5 by men and 5 by women. There were a total number of 130 participating K-pop singers and celebrities from 15 management companies, divided into 16 teams.

== Results ==
=== Men ===
Event	Gold	Silver	Bronze
100 m	Team L Jo Kwon (2AM)	Team J Dongjun (ZE:A)	Team N Taecyeon (2PM)
110 m Hurdles	Team O Minho (Shinee)	Team O Eunhyuk (Super Junior)	Team N Chansung (2PM)
4 X 100 m	Team L Lee Hyun (8Eight); Jinwoon (2AM); Changmin (2AM); Jo Kwon (2AM)	Team O Eunhyuk (Super Junior); Jonghyun (Shinee); Jungmo (TraxX); Minho (Shinee)	Team H L (Infinite); Sungyeol (Infinite); Woohyun (Infinite); Hoya (Infinite)
Long jump	Team L Lee Hyun (8Eight)	Team J Minwoo (ZE:A)	Team F Eli (U-KISS)
Javelin	Team O Shindong (Super Junior)	Team L Changmin (2AM)	Team A Doojoon (Beast)

=== Women ===
Event	Gold	Silver	Bronze
100 m	Team E Bora (Sistar)	Team J Eunji (Nine Muses)	Team E Hyolyn (Sistar)
100 m Hurdles	Team E Bora (Sistar)	Team O Luna (f(x))	Team N Jia (miss A)
4 X 100 m	Team E Hyolyn (Sistar); Dasom (Sistar); Soyou (Sistar); Bora (Sistar)	Team J Eunji (Nine Muses); Baby J (Jewelry); Binnie (Nine Muses); Lee Saem (Nine Muses)	Team M Lizzy (After School); Son Dam-bi; Uee (After School); Jungah (After School)
High jump	Team O Luna (f(x))	Team E Bora (Sistar)	Team M Son Dam-bi
Javelin	Team N Jia (miss A)	Team M Bekah (After School)	Team L Joo Hee (8Eight)

== Ratings ==
Episode #	Original broadcast date	TNmS Ratings		AGB Nielsen Ratings	
Episode #	Original broadcast date	Nationwide	Seoul National Capital Area	Nationwide	Seoul National Capital Area
1	September 25, 2010	16.6%	17.4%	15.3%	17.0%
2	September 26, 2010	14.6%	15.3%	14.2%	16.1%
