= Homme (duo) =

South Korean musical duo

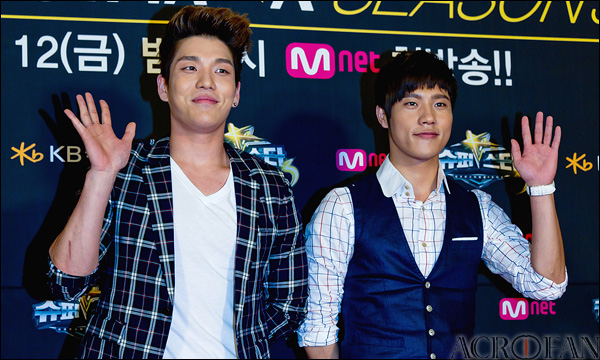
- Homme at Superstar K3 premier red carpet, August 2011

Background information
- Origin: Seoul, South Korea
- Genres: K-pop; R&B
- Years active: 2010–2018
- Label: Big Hit
- Past members: Lee Hyun; Lee Chang-min

Homme (Korean: 옴므) was a South Korean musical duo. The duo was composed of Lee Hyun and Lee Chang-min.

== Musical career ==
The duo consisted of 2AM's Lee Chang-min and 8Eight's Lee Hyun and was formed as a project group in 2010, with the release of their first digital single "I Was Able to Eat Well." The song was the signature debut project for the 2010 Mnet 20's Choice Awards by producer Bang Si-hyuk (aka 'Hitman Bang'), and was listed as the second most popular by Gaon in mobile ringtone sales in 2010. On their first anniversary, in July 2011, they released it as part of a single album titled Homme, and again as part of an EP titled Pour les femmes in 2014. They performed the song, which won Best Ballad Song at the "1st Korea Music Copyright Awards" ceremony hosted by the Korea Music Copyright Association (KOMCA) in December 2011.

"I Was Able to Eat Well" also received attention in 2011 when Korea's Youth Protection Committee (YPC) banned it for those under 19 for lyrics which included, "I’ll drink heavily with my friends to forget everything" and "Blub, blub, blub after I drank heavily yesterday."

Other singles the duo has released include "Man Should Laugh" (2011), "It Girl" (2014), and "Let's Not Cry" (2015), which preceded their October concert series Hommexit in Seoul. Also in 2015, they released another single "Ain't No Love."

In March 2016, they held a concert titled The Homme's Love at Yonsei University in celebration of White Day.

On February 1, 2018, BigHit Entertainment announced that Lee Chang-min would be leaving the agency to establish his own one-man agency after his exclusive contract came to an end in January.

== Discography ==
=== Extended plays ===
Title	Album details	Peak chart positions	Sales
Title	Album details	KOR	Sales
Pour les femmes	Released: July 23, 2014; Label: Big Hit Entertainment, LOEN Entertainment; Formats: CD, digital download	72	KOR: 1,139

=== Single albums ===
Title	Album details	Peak chart positions	Sales
Title	Album details	KOR	Sales
Homme by 'hitman' bang - Man Should Laugh	Released: July 19, 2011; Label: Big Hit Entertainment, LOEN Entertainment; Formats: CD, digital download	7	KOR: 3,661

=== Singles ===
Title	Year	Peak chart positions	Sales (DL)	Album
Title	Year	KOR	Sales (DL)	Album
"I Was Able to Eat Well" (밥만 잘 먹더라)	2010	1	KOR: 2,533,104	Homme by 'hitman' bang - Man Should Laugh
"Man Should Laugh" (남자니까 웃는거야)	2011	6	KOR: 1,682,588	Homme by 'hitman' bang - Man Should Laugh
"It Girl"	2014	35	KOR: 173,191	Pour les femmes
"No More Cry" (울지 말자)	2015	32	KOR: 113,249	Non-album singles
"Ain't No Love" (사랑이 아냐)	2015	41	KOR: 47,614	Non-album singles
"Just Come to Me" (너 내게로 와라)	2016	64	KOR: 68,640	Non-album singles
"Dilemma" (딜레마)	2016	59	KOR: 32,380	Non-album singles
"All of Me" (내겐 전부니까)	2016	68	KOR: 30,270	Non-album singles
"Sweet Waiting" (어디쯤 왔니)	2017	—	—N/a	Non-album singles
"—" denotes releases that did not chart.

=== Other charted songs ===
Title	Year	Peak chart positions	Sales (DL)	Album
Title	Year	KOR	Sales (DL)	Album
"A Cliché Love Song" (뻔한 사랑 노래)	2011	67	KOR: 165,407	Homme by 'hitman' bang - Man Should Laugh

=== Collaborations ===
Title	Year	Peak chart positions	Sales (DL)	Album
Title	Year	KOR	Sales (DL)	Album
"3 Seconds" (3초) with Kisum	2015	66	KOR: 31,568	Dublekick's Project

=== Soundtrack appearances ===
Title	Year	Peak chart positions	Sales (DL)	Album
Title	Year	KOR	Sales (DL)	Album
"Because I'm Sorry" (들리지 않는 말)	2012	38	KOR: 201,568	Five Fingers OST
"Love Comes With Goodbyes" (사랑은 이별을 품고 온다)	2012	—	KOR: 16,542	Endless Love OST

== Awards and nominations ==
Name of the award ceremony, year presented, category, nominee(s) of the award, and the result of the nomination
Award ceremony	Year	Category	Nominee(s)/work(s)	Result	Ref.
Melon Music Awards	2010	Song of the Year	"I Was Able to Eat Well"	Nominated	
Mnet Asian Music Awards	2010	Best Collaboration	"I Was Able to Eat Well"	Nominated	
Bugs Music Awards	2010	Best Duet	"I Was Able to Eat Well"	Nominated	
KOMCA Music Awards	2011	Best Ballad Song	"I Was Able to Eat Well"	Won	
