= Park Ji-yoon =

South Korean actress and singer (born 1982)

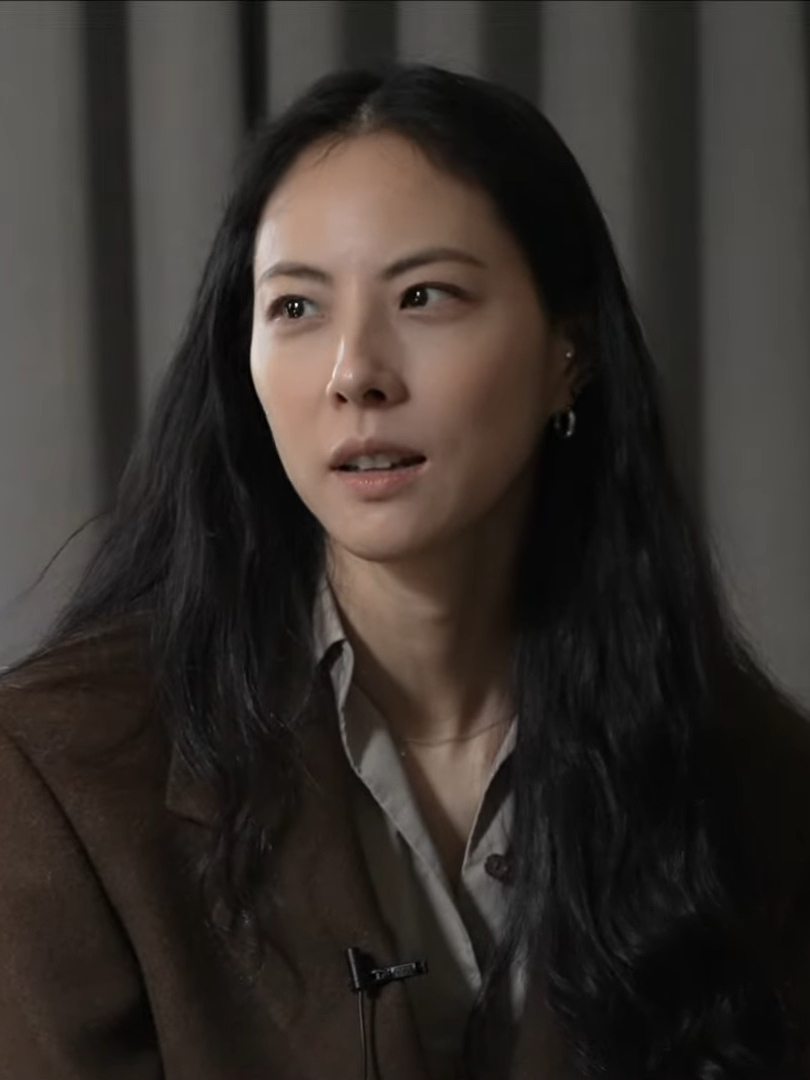
- Park in December 2023
- Born: Park Ji-yoon; January 3, 1982 (age 44)
- Education: Kyunghee University
- Occupations: Singer; actress
- Spouse: Jo Soo-yong (m. 2019)
- Children: 1
- Musical career
- Genres: K-pop, R&B, hip hop, indie, folk, modern rock
- Years active: 1993–present
- Label: Parkjiyoon Creative
- Website: parkjiyoon.co.kr

Korean name
- Hangul: 박지윤
- Hanja: 朴志胤
- RR: Bak Jiyun
- MR: Pak Chiyun

Park Ji-yoon (Korean: 박지윤; born January 3, 1982) is a South Korean singer, actress, and model. As a teen model, she gained wide exposure after starring in a Haitai biscuit commercial in 1994, and held a minor role in the television drama Dinosaur Teacher that same year. Her debut studio album, Skyblue Dream, was released in 1997. Park's early career under Taewon Entertainment saw the hit singles "Skyblue Dream", "Steal Away", "Precious Love" and "Don't Know Anything", and she was associated with a charming and fresh image.

In 2000, Park signed with JYP Entertainment and released her fourth album, Coming-of-Age Ceremony. She attracted attention for her provocative transformation, and the album's lead single of the same name became a defining hit for her. She released two further albums with JYP before going on a six-year hiatus in 2003.

== Career ==
After debuting as a commercial model at the age of 13, Park released her first studio album in 1997, titled Skyblue Dream. Her hit singles "Skyblue Dream" (하늘색 꿈; Haneulsaek kkum) from her debut album, "Coming-of-Age Ceremony" (성인식; Seonginsik) from her fourth full-length album, and "I'm a Man" (난 남자야; nan namjaya) from Man, received a lot of love from fans.

However, due to creative differences, Park left JYP Entertainment after her sixth studio album Woo~ Twenty One; she felt that instead of showing her true self as an artist, she was being controlled by producer Park Jin-young. Park then took an extended break from singing and entered the film and musical fields.

Six years later, Park returned with her seventh studio album, Flower, Again for the First Time. Leaving behind her sexy image from "Coming-of-Age Ceremony", Park attempted to put her experiences of being in her 20s into this album, writing three of the songs on it and having creative input in producing the album as well as providing her own photography for the album design. She made her comeback with the song "In My Fading Memory" (바래진 기억에; Baraejin gieoge) on MBC's Show! Music Core, and SBS's Inkigayo. The song was written and produced by Kim Yong-rin from Dear Cloud.

Park's eighth studio album, Tree of Life was released on February 16, 2012. Receiving positive reviews, Park collaborated again with Kim Yong-rin. She also worked with Mate's Jung Jun-il, and No Reply's Kwon Soon-kwan. Park wrote many tracks on this album; "At That Time" (그땐; Geuttaen), "Afternoon" (오후; Ohu), "The Road to You" (너에게 가는 길; Neoege ganeun gil), "Star" (별; Byeol), and "Quiet Dream". As with her previous work, Park contributed artistically through the photography on Tree of Life, collaborating on the album art once again with her older sister, who is a graphic designer. The song "The Road to You" was featured on the Korean trailer for the Hollywood movie, My Week with Marilyn starring Michelle Williams.

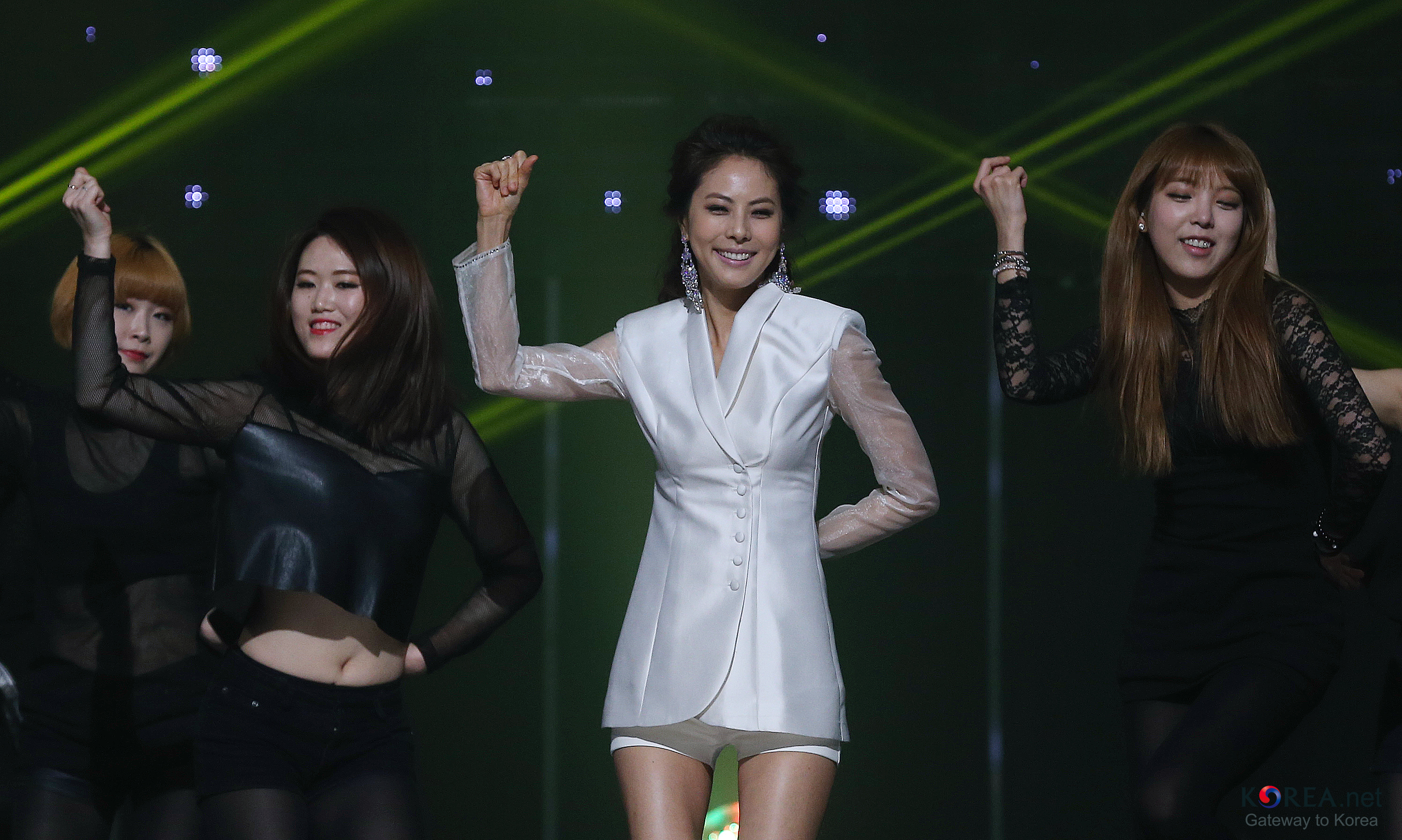
Park performing "Beep" in 2014

Park joined entertainment company Mystic89, and made her comeback in late October 2013. Her first digital singles released through Mystic89 is Mr., which was produced by Primary and "Witness", which was produced by Yoon Jong-shin. Mystic89 and Park plan to release several mini albums, collaborating with top producers and writers. The music will be a varying blend of several genres. Her new album was Mystic company was commercially successful. The title song ranked No. 1 on Korean music release chart such as Naver Music and Daum Music when it was released.

After the minialbum with Mystic company, Park came back to her own "Park Ji Yoon Creative" to focus more on her career as a songwriter instead of as a dance singer. She released her ninth album "Park Ji Yoon 9" on March 2, 2017. The album contains ten songs, eight of them composed by herself. This album is more in line with her seventh and eighth album and uses classic instruments.

== Personal life ==
=== Education ===
Park graduated from Kyung Hee University with a BA in postmodern music in 2004. She received an MA in popular arts from the same university in 2010.

=== Marriage and family ===
Park married Kakao co-CEO Jo Su-yong in March 2019. The couple welcomed their first child, a daughter, in January 2021.

== Philanthropy ==
On September 6, 2022, Park donated ₩10 million to help those affected by the due to heavy rain and typhoon through The Hope Bridge Korea Disaster Relief Association.

On October 26, 2022, Park donated 20 million worth of women's products through the Hope Bridge National Disaster Relief Association.

== Discography ==
=== Studio albums ===
Title	Album details	Peak chart positions		Sales
Title	Album details	KOR RIAK	KOR Gaon	Sales
Parkjiyoon 1	Released: December 1, 1997; Label: Seoul Records; Format: CD, cassette; Track listing: 1. 하늘색 꿈 (Skyblue Dream); 2. Emotion; 3. 멀리있는 너에게 (You Are Far Away); 4. Baby Baby Baby; 5. 애상 (Sorrow); 6. 추억 (Memory); 7. 슬픈인사 (Sad Greeting); 8. 하늘색 꿈 (Bonus Track;MR)	—	—	KOR: 150,000+
Blue Angel	Released: November 5, 1998; Label: Seoul Records; Format: CD, cassette; Track listing: 1. 내 눈에 슬픈 비 (The Rain in My Eyes); 2. 내 남자 (My Man); 3. Steal Away (주인공); 4. Last Night; 5. 널 보내고 (I Sent It); 6. 소중한 사랑 (Precious Love); 7. 너도 나처럼 (You Like Me); 8. 위험한 사랑 (Dangerous Love); 9. 별거 아냐 (No Separation); 10. 천사 (Angel)	13	—	KOR: 230,000+
The Age Ain't Nothing But a Number	Released: August 8, 1999; Label: Seoul Records; Format: CD, cassette; Track listing: 1. Intro; 2. 아무것도 몰라요 (Don't Know Anything); 3. Love Signal; 4. 가버려 (Go Away); 5. Broken; 6. 후애 (Without Words); 7. 여자가 남자를 떠날 때 (When A Man Leaves A Woman); 8. Blue moon 9. 싫증 (Tired); 10. 난 울지도 몰라 (I Don't Know How to Cry); 11. Blessing; 12. Kiss in the Dark (Hidden Track); 13. 여자가 남자를 떠날 때 (괜찮아요) (When a Man Leaves a Woman (I'm Okay)) (Hidden Track); 14. Joyful, Joyful (Hidden Track)	2	—	KOR: 378,025
Coming of Age Ceremony (성인식)	Released: July 26, 2000; Label: JYP Entertainment; Format: CD, cassette; Track listing: 1. Intro; 2. 달빛의 노래 (Moon Song); 3. 성인식 (Adult Ceremony); 4. 내가 원하는 남자 (I Want a Man); 5. 환상 (Illusion); 6. 연극 (Theater); 7. 꿀 (Honey); 8. 그댈 원했지만 (You're Wanted); 9. 귀향 (Homecoming); 10. 사랑이 시작되기전에 (Love Before); 11. 떠나는 이유 (Excuse to Leave); 12. 그대 그리고 사랑 (You and Love); 13. 달빛의 노래 (Remix)	1	—	KOR: 399,143
Man	Released: January 11, 2002; Label: JYP Entertainment; Format: CD, cassette; Track listing: 1. 사랑을 버리기까지 (Love to Abandon); 2. 난 남자야 (I'm a Man); 3. 안돼요 돼요 (Do Not); 4. 백조 (Swan); 5. 그냥 사랑하면 되는데 (I Need to Love Which?) (featuring Rain); 6. 와줘요 (I Need You); 7. 두눈을 감고서 (Eyes are Closed); 8. 돌아온 사랑 (Loving Back); 9. 난 사랑에 빠졌죠 (I Fell in Love); 10. 날 기다려준 그대곁에 (The Day I Stood By Your Side); 11. 잊을래 잊을래 (Forget Forget); 12. Nastified (featuring Willa Ford); 13. 성인식 [Remix] (Adult Ceremony); 14. 빈 자리 (Empty Seats)	3	—	KOR: 142,108
Woo~ Twenty One	Released: February 27, 2003; Label: JYP Entertainment; Format: CD, cassette; Track listing: 1. 이게 나야 (This is Me); 2. 할 줄 알어? (Do You Know How?); 3. DJ (feat. PSY); 4. 가져요 (Take It); 5. 어떻게 할까요 (What Do I Do?); 6. 소중한 사람들에게 (Important People); 7. 시작 (Start) (feat. Kan Mi Youn, MC Smily, Garuda); 8. 재회 (Reunion); 9. 이게 나야?! (This is Me?!); 10. 집시여인 (Gypsies); 11. 차마 (Bear); 12. 잘못 (Mistake) (feat. Sung Si Kyung); 13. 이제야 (Now); 14. 여자가 남자에게 바라는 11가지 (11 Things Women Want from Men); 15. 고백 (Confession); 16. 나 상처 받았어; (I Got Hurt) (Bonus Track)	6	—	KOR: 105,334
Flower, Again for the First Time (꽃, 다시 첫 번째)	Released: April 23, 2009; Label: Parkjiyoon Creative; Format: CD, digital download; Track listing: 1. 안녕 Hello; 2. 봄, 여름 그 사이 Between Summer and Spring; 3. 바래진 기억에 In a Faded Memory; 4. 4월 16일 April 16; 5. 그대는 나무같아 He's Like a Flower; 6. 잠꼬대 Sleep Talking; 7. 봄 눈; Spring Snow; 8. 돌아오면 돼 You Just Need to Come Back; 9. 괜찮아요 I'm Okay	—N/a	—	KOR: 12,000
Tree of Life (나무가 되는 꿈)	Released: February 20, 2012; Label: Parkjiyoon Creative; Format: CD, digital download; Track listing: 1. 그땐 (That Time); 2. 그럴꺼야 (Don't Look Back); 3. Ohu (오후; The Afternoon); 4. 나무가 되는 꿈 (Tree of Life); 5. 고백 (Confession); 6. 사랑하지 않아 (A Love Lost Over Dinner); 7. 너에게 가는 길 (The Road to You); 8. 그 날들처럼 (Like Days Past); 9. 별 (Star); 10. Quiet Dream; 11. 괜찮아요 (Echoes) (feat. Park Asher)	—N/a	9	KOR: 3,719
Parkjiyoon9	Released: March 2, 2017; Label: Parkjiyoon Creative; Format: CD, digital download; Track listing: 1. 사랑하고 있어; 2. 그러지마요; 3. 겨울이 온다; 4. 달이 피는 밤 5. 기적; 6. 다른 사람 사랑할 준비를 해 7. 어디로 가고 있는 걸까; 8. 우리의 하루; 9. O 10. 오후 (2017)	—N/a	19	KOR: 2,195
Breathe Breathe	Released: December 14, 2023; Label: Parkjiyoon Creative; Format: CD, digital download; Track listing: 1. Breathe a breath 2. Until my all hurts 3. You - 2022 Album Remastered; 4. Love was my song 5. Make them love 6. Petal; 7. I'll say it's alright 8. I'm sorry 9. Moon; 10. Whale, moonlight under the moon	—N/a	—	
"—" denotes release did not chart. The Recording Industry Association of Korea album ranking was published from 1999 to 2008. The Gaon Music Chart was established in 2010.

=== Compilation and live albums ===
Title	Album details	Peak chart positions		Sales
Title	Album details	KOR RIAK	KOR Gaon	Sales
+ Best (Forever Park Ji-yoon)	Released: June 28, 2000; Label: Seoul Records; Format: CD, cassette; Track listing: 1. Steal Away (Juingong) (Steal Away (주인공); Hero); 2. 소중한 사랑; Precious Love; 3. emotion 4. 아무것도 몰라요 Don't Know Anything; 5. 내 남자 My Man; 6. 내 눈에 슬픈 비 The Rain in My Eyes; 7. 슬픈인사 Sad Greeting; 8. Broken; 9. 가버려 Go Away; 10. baby baby baby 11. 애상 Sorrow; 12. Blue moon 13. 별거 아냐 No Separation; 14. 너도 나처럼 You Like Me	—	—	
Parkjiyoon 20th Anniversary Photo&Live Album	Released: April 5, 2018; Label: Parkjiyooon Creative; Format: 2CD+Photobook, digital download; Track listing: 1. 겨울이 온다 Winter is coming 2. 달이 피는 밤 Moonlit night 3. 기적 miracle 4. 너에게 가는 길 Road to you 5. 아무것도 몰라요 I don't know anything 6. 난 사랑에 빠졌죠 I'm in love 7. 오후 afternoon 8. 나무가 되는 꿈 Tree dream 9. 그리워 with.임헌일 Miss with Lim Heon-il; 10. 눈의 꽃 Snow flower 11. 환상 fantasy 12. 잠꼬대 sleep talking 13. 사랑하고 있어 I love you 14. 성인식 Quinceanera; 15. 소중한 사랑 Precious love 16. 유후 you hoo 17. 그러지마요 Don't do that 18. 그대는 나무 같아 You are like a tree 19. 바래진 기억에 In faded memories	—N/a	39	
"—" denotes release did not chart. The Recording Industry Association of Korea album ranking was published from 1999 to 2008. The Gaon Music Chart was established in 2010.

=== Singles ===
Title	Year	Peak chart positions		Sales	Album
Title	Year	KOR Gaon	KOR Hot	Sales	Album
"Skyblue Dream" (하늘색 꿈)	1997	—	—		Skyblue Dream
"Baby Baby Baby"	1997	—	—		Skyblue Dream
"Steal Away" (주인공)	1998	—	—		Blue Angel
"Precious Love" (소중한 사랑)	1998	—	—		Blue Angel
"The Rain in My Eyes" (내 눈에 슬픈 비)	1998	—	—		Blue Angel
"Go Away" (가버려)	1999	—	—		The Age Ain't Nothing But a Number
"I Don't Know Anything" (아무것도 몰라요)	1999	—	—		The Age Ain't Nothing But a Number
"Coming of Age Ceremony" (성인식)	2000	—	—		Coming of Age Ceremony
"Song of Moonlight" (달빛의 노래)	2000	—	—		Coming of Age Ceremony
"Illusion" (환상)	2000	—	—		Coming of Age Ceremony
"I'm a Man" (난 남자야)	2002	—	—		Man
"I Fell in Love" (난 사랑에 빠졌죠)	2002	—	—		Man
"Swan" (백조)	2002	—	—		Man
"Can You?" (할줄 알어?)	2003	—	—		Woo~ Twenty One
"DJ" (feat. Psy)	2003	—	—		Woo~ Twenty One
"11 Things Women Want from Men" (여자가 남자에게 바라는 11가지)	2003	—	—		Woo~ Twenty One
"In My Fading Memory" (바래진 기억에)	2009	—	—		Flower, Again for the First Time
"Quiet Dream"	2012	58	—	KOR: 109,141 (DL)	Non-album single
"Tree of Life" (나무가 되는 꿈)	2012	54	—	KOR: 221,957 (DL)	Tree of Life
"Mr. Lee" (feat. San E)	2013	2	2	KOR: 858,091 (DL)	Non-album singles
"Beep"	2014	12	19	KOR: 203,727 (DL)	Non-album singles
"Yoo Hoo"	2014	55	19	KOR: 87,134 (DL)	Non-album singles
"O"	2016	—			Parkjiyoon9
"Winter is Coming" (겨울이 온다)	2016	—			Parkjiyoon9
"Don't Do That" (그러지마요)	2016	—			Parkjiyoon9
"Moonlit Night" (달이 피는 밤)	2016	—			Parkjiyoon9
"Illusion" (환상)	2018	—			Parkjiyoon 20th Anniversary Photo&Live Album
"Journey"	2018	—			Non-album singles
"Forget" (잊어요)	2019	—			Non-album singles
"Spring of the Day" (그날의 봄)	2020	—			Non-album singles
"—" denotes release did not chart. Note: The Gaon Music Chart was established in 2010.

=== Other charted songs ===
Title	Year	Peak chart positions	Sales	Album
Title	Year	KOR Gaon	Sales	Album
"Don't Look Back"	2012	151		Tree of Life
"Silent Confession"	2012	172		Tree of Life
"That Time"	2012	183		Tree of Life
"Afternoon"	2012	184		Tree of Life
"A Love Lost Over Dinner"	2012	198		Tree of Life
"Witness"	2013	60	KOR: 41,386 (DL)	Non-album single
"Inner Space"	2014	122	KOR: 14,894 (DL)	Non-album single

=== Soundtrack appearances ===
Title	Year	Peak chart positions	Sales	Album
Title	Year	KOR Gaon	Sales	Album
"Memory"	1998	—		First Kiss OST
"Nocturne (夜想曲) (Sully Ver.)"	2008	—		Bicheonmu OST
"Lascia ch'io pianga"	2012	—		Opera Stars 2012 Round 1
"Habanera"	2012	—		Opera Stars 2012 Round 2
"Vissi D`arte Vissi D`amore"	2012	—		Opera Stars 2012 Round 3
"Ebben? ...Ne Andro Lontana"	2012	—		Opera Stars 2012 Round 4
"Un bel dì vedremo"	2012	—		Opera Stars 2012 Semi Final
"If You Erase Everything"	2012	—		Goodbye Dear Wife OST
"I Do"	2012	64	KOR: 78,532 (DL)	I Do, I Do OST
"How Beautiful You Are"	2013	—		3 Women In Inotia OST
"Stay Tuned" with Cho Hyung-woo	2014	—		Pride & Prejudice OST
"Fool"	2015	—		King of Mask Singer: Episode 29
"—" denotes release did not chart. Note: The Gaon Music Chart was established in 2010.

== Filmography ==
=== Film ===
Year	Title	Role
1998	First Kiss	Joo Yoo-won (cameo appearance)
2010	Seoul	Ji-hye
2012	Grape Candy	So-ra

=== Television series ===
Year	Title	Role
1993	Dinosaur Teacher	
1998	Three Guys and Three Girls	Park Ji-yoon
1999	Ghost	Jun-hee
2004	Human Market	Oh Da-hye
2006–2008	Bicheonmoo	Taruga Sulli
2011	Lie to Me	Manager Park
2012	Goodbye Dear Wife	Oh Hyang-gi
2012	Family	Woo Ji-yoon
2013	Bel Ami	Myo-mi

=== Television show ===
Year	Title	Role	Notes	Ref.
2022	100 Reading Show - Reading the Earth	Narrator	Part 3: Like Nature, Live	

== Awards and nominations ==
Award	Year	Category	Nominated work / nominee	Result	Ref.
Golden Disc Awards	2000	Album Bonsang	Coming of Age Ceremony	Won	
Golden Disc Awards	2002	Music Video Popularity Award	"I'm a Man"	Won	
KBS Music Awards	1999	Bonsang (Main Prize)	Park Ji-yoon	Won	
KBS Music Awards	2000	Bonsang (Main Prize)	Park Ji-yoon	Won	
KBS Music Awards	2002	Bonsang (Main Prize)	Park Ji-yoon	Won	
KMTV Korean Music Awards	2000	Bonsang (Main Prize)	Park Ji-yoon	Won	
Korean Entertainment Arts Awards	2000	Youth Artist Award	Park Ji-yoon	Nominated	
Mnet Asian Music Awards	1999	Best Female Artist	"I Don't Know Anything"	Nominated	
Mnet Asian Music Awards	2000	Best Female Artist	"Coming of Age Ceremony"	Won	
Mnet Asian Music Awards	2000	Best Dance Performance	"Coming of Age Ceremony"	Nominated	
SBS Gayo Daejeon	1998	Best New Artist	Park Ji-yoon	Won	
SBS Gayo Daejeon	1999	Top Ten Singer Award	Park Ji-yoon	Won	
SBS Gayo Daejeon	2000	Top Ten Singer Award	Park Ji-yoon	Won	
Seoul Music Awards	2000	Bonsang (Main Prize)	Park Ji-yoon	Won	
Seoul Music Awards	2001	Bonsang (Main Prize)	Park Ji-yoon	Won	
