= Blue Angel (Park Ji-yoon album) =

Studio album by Park Ji-yoon
- Released: November 1998
- Genres: K-pop, dance, Ballad
- Length: 38:25
- Language: Korean
- Label: Seoul Records

Park Ji-yoon chronology
Parkjiyoon 1 (1997)	Blue Angel (1998)	The Age Ain't Nothing But A Number (1999)

Singles from Blue Angel
- 1. "Steal Away (주인공)" Released: November 1998; 2. "내 눈에 슬픈 비 (The Rain in My Eyes)" Released: November 1998; 3. "소중한 사랑 (Precious Love)" Released: November 1998

Blue Angel is the second studio album by South Korean singer, actress, and model Park Ji-yoon. It was released in November 1998. The album earned her the Best New Artist award at SBS Gayo Daejeon.

== Release and promotions ==
The album has been described wherein "you can see Park Ji-yoon's cuteness and innocence". Composed of songs from various hit-makers such as Park Jin-young, Kim Hyeong-seok, and Yun Il-sang, Park Ji-yoon promoted the album on various music shows with her title track 'Steal Away' and B-side track 'Precious Love' and was able to make huge success and appeared in various commercials. Along with this, she was invited to hold a mini-concert and debut in a musical.

== Track listing ==
Track listing and credits adapted from Melon and the Korea Music Copyright Association song database.

Blue Angel track listing
No.	Title	Lyrics	Music	Length
1.	"The Rain in My Eyes" (내 눈에 슬픈 비)	Yang Jae-seon	Kim Hyeong-seok	3:39
2.	"My Man" (내 남자)	Park Jin-young	Park Jin-young	3:25
3.	"Steal Away (주인공)"	Lee Seung-ho	Yun Il-sang	3:58
4.	"Last Night"	Bae Jeong-eun	Bae Jeong-eun	4:32
5.	"I Sent It" (널 보내고)	Kim Jong-suk	Bang Si-hyuk	3:17
6.	"Precious Love" (소중한 사랑)	Park Jin-young	Park Jin-young	3:44
7.	"You Like Me" (너도 나처럼)	Yeo Jeong-yun	Kim Hyeong-seok	4:00
8.	"Dangerous Love" (위험한 사랑)	Kim Dong-hyeon	Park Seong-su	3:31
9.	"No Separation" (별거 아냐)	Kim Jong-suk	Lee Cheol-won	4:00
10.	"Angel" (천사)	Kim Jong-suk	Bang Si-hyuk	4:20
Total length:				38:25
