= Lim Jeong-hee =

South Korean singer (born 1981)

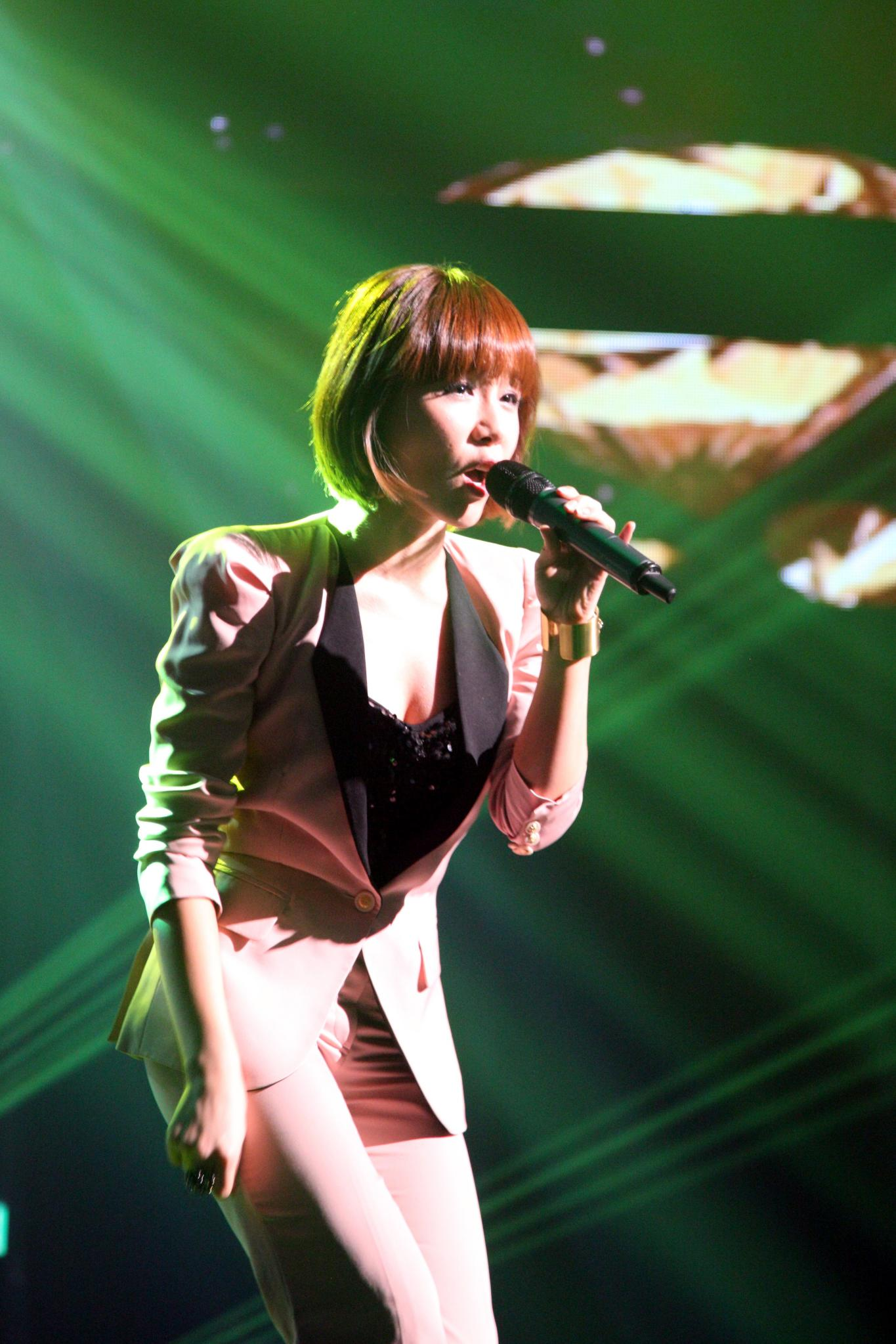
- Lim performing at the Cyworld Dream Music Festival, July 23, 2011
- Born: May 17, 1981 (age 45); Seoul, South Korea
- Occupation: Singer
- Years active: 2005–present
- Spouse: Kim Hee-hyun (m. 2023)
- Children: 1
- Musical career
- Genres: R&B; pop
- Instruments: Piano; Guitar
- Labels: JYP; Big Hit; Oscar

Korean name
- Hangul: 임정희
- Hanja: 林正姬
- RR: Im Jeonghui
- MR: Im Chŏnghŭi

Lim Jeong-hee (Korean: 임정희; born May 17, 1981), also known as J-Lim, is a South Korean singer who debuted in 2005 under JYP Entertainment. One of her notable performances in 2005 was the 5th Pattaya Music Festival in Thailand, which helped promote and expose her to the foreign music industry. She was signed under Big Hit Music in 2012 and left the company in 2015, going on to join her current agency, Oscar ENT.

== Biography ==
When she was in high school Lim participated in a song contest for teens held by the Seoul government and won the grand prize. The experience of competing in the song contest and winning the top prize led Lim to enter college to study popular music.

== Career ==
She signed with JYP Entertainment. Even before she had her official debut, Lim held countless street performances on her own which led to the creation of her multiple fan clubs.

Lim debuted in 2005 with her first album Music is My Life.

Her third album, Before I Go, J-Lim, made headlines for featuring Big Boi from Outkast who also appeared in the music video. On May 8, 2011, she released a music video featuring G.NA, Hyuna and comedian Park Hwi Soon called "Golden Lady". On May 12, 2011, she made her comeback performance on M Countdown with her single "Golden Lady". On July 2, 2011, she announced that she had been cast as the female lead for the musical Temptation of Wolves and would be tackling the challenge of her first musical. From July 12 to October 3, Lim Jeong Hee played Jung Hankyung, a charming girl who's caught between two different guys for her love. On November 20, 2011, she announced that she was Brian McKnight's duet partner for his twelfth album JUST ME. She stated, "It's a huge honor to be standing on the same stage as world-renowned R&B legend, Brian McKnight". In 2011, she also appeared on tvN's survival program Opera Star 2011, where she made it to the semi-finals.

== Personal life ==
On October 3, 2023, Lim married ballet dancer Kim Hee-hyun, a former soloist at the Korea National Ballet, in Seoul after dating for a year. Lim announced her pregnancy on May 29, 2025. On September 8, 2025, Lim gave birth to a son named Ha-im.

== Discography ==
=== Studio albums ===
Title	Album details	Peak chart positions	Sales
Title	Album details	KOR	Sales
Music is My Life	Released: June 10, 2005; Label: JYP Entertainment; Format: CD, cassette	20	KOR: 14,837+
Thanks	Released: March 24, 2006; Label: JYP Entertainment; Format: CD, cassette	8	KOR: 29,995+
Before I Go, J-Lim	Released: October 4, 2007; Label: JYP Entertainment, Big Hit Entertainment; Format: CD	15	KOR: 18,330+

=== Extended plays ===
Title	Album details	Peak chart positions	Sales
Title	Album details	KOR	Sales
It Can't Be Real	Released: September 30, 2010; Label: JYP Entertainment, Big Hit Entertainment; Format: CD, digital download	22	—N/a
Golden Lady	Released: May 9, 2011; Label: JYP Entertainment, Big Hit Entertainment; Format: CD, digital download	15	KOR: 1,341+

=== Singles ===
Title	Year	Peak chart positions	Sales	Album
Title	Year	KOR	Sales	Album
As lead artist
"Music Is My Life"	2005	—		Music Is My Life
"Tears That Didn't Fall" (눈물이 안났어)	2005	30	KOR: 208,004	Music Is My Life
"Don't Go, My Love" (사랑아 가지마)	2006	—		Thanks
"Trace" (흔적)	2006	—		Thanks
"Madly in Love" (사랑에 미치면) feat. Big Boi & JY Park	2007	—		Before I Go, J-Lim
"Heaven Breeze" (하늘아 바람아)	2007	—		Non-album single
"On The Way To Break Up With You" (헤어지러 가는 길) feat. Jo Kwon	2010	3	KOR: 1,453,729	It Can't Be Real
"It Can't Be Real" (진짜일 리 없어)	2010	5	KOR: 1,423,854	It Can't Be Real
"Himawari" (Sunflower / 해바라기) (Masaharu Fukuyama cover)	2011	44	KOR: 211,173	Non-album single
"Golden Lady" feat. Hyuna	2011	4	KOR: 1,602,615	Golden Lady
"Luv Is" feat. Baechigi	2013	7	KOR: 458,553	Non-album singles
"Feel So Good" feat. Hong Dae Kwang	2013	23	KOR: 188,686	Non-album singles
"Crazy"	2016	93	KOR: 18,931	Non-album singles
"I.O.U"	2016	—		Non-album singles
"The Christmas Day"	2017	—		Non-album singles
Collaborations
"Beautiful You" (아름다운 널) with Kolleen Park	2010	11		Non-album singles
"It's Been A Long Time" (오랜만이다) with Herz Analog	2013	31		Non-album singles
"Like A Movie" (영화처럼) with 40	2013	53		Non-album singles
"Perfect Christmas" with Jo Kwon, Joo Hee of 8Eight, RM & Jungkook	2013	45		Non-album singles
"There Is No Love" (사랑은 없다) with Timber	2014	63		Non-album singles
"—" denotes releases that did not chart.

=== Soundtrack appearances ===
Title	Year	Peak chart positions	Sales	Album
Title	Year	KOR	Sales	Album
"I Can't Love You" (사랑은 못해요)	2010	81		Smile, Mom OST Part 3
"If You Turn Back Time" (시간을 되돌린다면)	2011	40		Royal Family OST Part 3
"Filament" (필라멘트)	2012	42		Wild Romance OST Part 1
"Don't Love Me" (날 사랑하지마)	2012	34		Five Fingers OST Part 1
"Poison Love" (지독한 사랑)	2013	52		Don't Look Back: The Legend of Orpheus OST
"I'll Be There" (시간에 기대어)	2013	65		Medical Top Team OST Part 4
"Scent of a Flower" (꽃향기)	2014	24		Emergency Couple OST Part 2
"It Hurts, It Hurts" (아파아파)	2015	85		Super Daddy Yeol OST Part 4
"Hope" (바라죠)	2016	—		My Lawyer, Mr. Jo OST Part 3
"Distressed" (달)	2016	—		Secret Healer OST Part 3
"The Coat" (외투)	2017	—		Two Cops OST Part 6
"Black Diamond"	2019	—		Graceful Family OST Part 1
"My Song"	2023	—		Live Your Own Life OST Part 1
"—" denotes releases that did not chart.

== Awards and nominations ==
Name of the award ceremony, year presented, award category, nominee of the award and the result of the nomination
Award ceremony	Year	Category	Nominee / Work	Result	Ref.
Golden Disc Awards	2005	Best New Artist	"Music Is My Life"	Won	
Mnet Asian Music Awards	2005	Best New Artist	"Music Is My Life"	Won	
Mnet Asian Music Awards	2006	Best R&B Performance	"Trace"	Nominated	
