= Lee Hyun =

South Korean singer

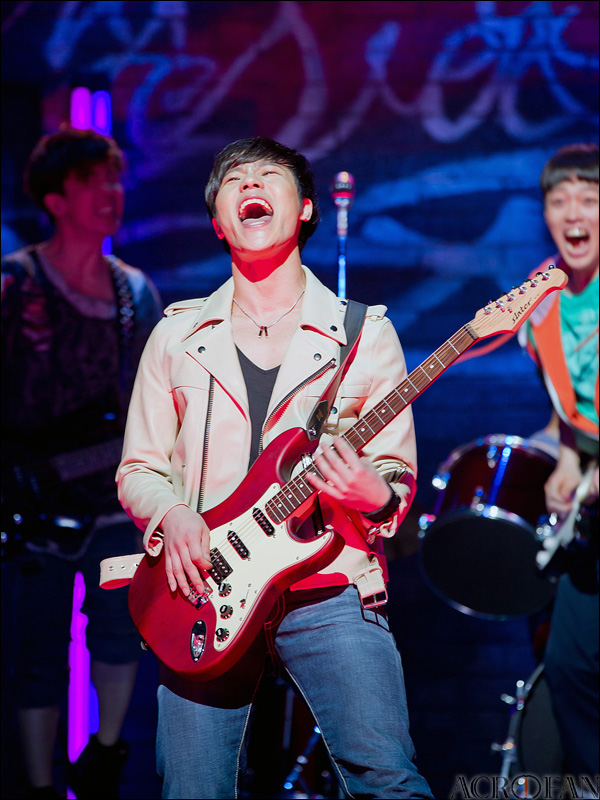
- Lee in 2012

Background information
- Also known as: Midnatt
- Born: November 8, 1983 (age 42); South Korea
- Genres: R&B; ballad
- Occupation: Singer
- Years active: 2007–present
- Labels: Big Hit; Source
- Formerly of: 8Eight; Homme

YouTube information
- Channel: 혀니콤보 TV
- Subscribers: 349,000
- Views: 43.8 million
- Last updated: August 4, 2026

Korean name
- Hangul: 이현
- RR: I Hyeon
- MR: I Hyŏn

Lee Hyun (Korean: 이현; born November 8, 1983) is a South Korean singer. He debuted in 2007 as a member of the co-ed vocal group 8Eight, which disbanded in 2014. He was also a member of the disbanded vocal duo Homme from 2010 to 2018. Lee is currently signed to Big Hit Music as a solo artist. He introduced his alter ego Midnatt in March 2023, through the release of the single "Masquerade".

== Career ==
=== 2007–2014: 8Eight ===
Lee joined Big Hit Entertainment as a trainee in 2005 and signed with the company in 2007. That same year, he debuted as part of the co-ed trio 8Eight, alongside Baek Chan and Joo Hee. The group released three studio albums between 2007 and 2009, and two extended plays in 2010 and 2011. On 21 December 2014, Big Hit and Source announced that Baek and Joo Hee’s contracts had expired and that group activities were suspended; the label noted the members remained on good terms and did not rule out a future reunion.

On 31 January 2020, Big Hit and Source confirmed that 8Eight would release a new single on 7 February to commemorate the 10th anniversary of “Without a Heart”, produced by “Hitman” Bang and Wonderkid. The digital single Fool Again was issued on 7 February 2020 with a new “Without a Heart (10th Anniversary Ver.)” as the B-side, marking the trio’s first release together in six years.

=== 2009–present: Solo activities and Homme ===
Lee released his solo debut single "30분전" ("30 Minutes Ago") on 8 September 2009, in both digital and physical formats. A duet featuring Lim Jeong-hee, it was written by Bang Si-hyuk as the final part of his "Goodbye" trilogy, following Baek Ji-young's "총 맞은 것처럼" ("Like Being Hit by a Bullet") and 8Eight's "심장이 없어" ("Without a Heart"). He performed the song for the first time on Music Bank on 11 September 2009. He also contributed “숨이 막혀” (“I Can’t Breathe”) to the KBS2 series Invincible Lee Pyung Kang, released on 2 November 2009.

In 2010, Lee recorded "왜 나를 울려요" ("Why Make Me Cry") for the SBS drama Big Thing; it was released as the fourth OST single on 27 October 2010. That year he also formed the project duo Homme with Changmin of 2AM, releasing the single "I Was Able to Eat Well" (밥만 잘 먹더라) under producer Bang Si-hyuk.

Lee's first solo studio album, The Healing Echo, was released on 2 January 2012 with "Because It's You" as the title track. In 2018, following the expiry of Changmin’s contract with Big Hit at the end of January, the label announced his departure to establish a one-man agency; Lee remained with Big Hit as a soloist.

In 2019, Lee recorded "You Are Here" for the BTS World: Original Soundtrack, released globally on 28 June. He renewed his Big Hit contract in March 2021 and launched a YouTube channel to mark his 14th anniversary with the company. That summer he contributed the ballad "Deep Sadness" to the season two soundtrack of Love (ft. Marriage and Divorce) (released 26 June 2021), and issued his single "Moon in the Ocean" in July.

Lee introduced his alter ego Midnatt (Note: translates to "middle of the night" in Swedish; Korean press also reported a wordplay connotation of "bare face" in Korean.) in May 2023 with the digital single "Masquerade", released via Big Hit and Hybe Corporation's interactive media subsidiary Hybe Im. As Midnatt, Lee became the first artist in Hybe's "Project L", employing AI voice synthesis (through the Supertone technology acquired by Hybe) and extended reality to release simultaneous multilingual versions of the song.

On July 8, 2026, Big Hit Music officially announced that Lee had renewed his exclusive contract with the company. "It is very meaningful to be able to continue our relationship with an artist who has been with the company since its early days," said Big Hit Music . "We plan to actively support Lee Hyun’s activities based on the strong foundation of trust that we have built up over 19 years." Meanwhile, Lee Hyun remarked, "I have renewed my contract with Big Hit Music, which is both my musical hometown and my most dependable partner. This was based on our foundation of deep trust and respect for one another, just as it has been up until now."

== Personal life ==
Lee enlisted in the South Korean military on October 8, 2012, in order to carry out his mandatory military service. He received five weeks of basic training before serving as an active-duty soldier for 21 months. While enlisted, Lee co-starred in the military musical The Promise, co-produced by the Ministry of National Defense and the Korea Musical Theatre Association in commemoration of the 60th anniversary of the Korean War armistice. The musical ran from January 9 to 20, 2013, at the National Theater of Korea and co-starred actors Ji Hyun-woo, Kim Mu-yeol, and Jung Tae-woo, and singers Leeteuk of Super Junior and Yoon Hak of Supernova. Lee was discharged on July 7, 2014.

== Discography ==
=== Studio albums ===
Title	Album details	Peak chart positions	Sales
Title	Album details	KOR	Sales
The Healing Echo	Released: January 2, 2012; Label: Big Hit Entertainment; Formats: CD, digital download; Track listing: 1. Because You Are You (너니까); 2. Because of a Woman Like You (너란 여자 때문에); 3. It's Impossible (불가능해); 4. You Are the Right Girl (넌 나에게 꼭 맞춤); 5. I Can't Forget You (못 잊어); 6. Although You Said So (다며) [acoustic mix]; 7. 30 Minutes Ago (30분전); 8. You Are the Best of My Life (내꺼중에 최고); 9. We Can't Love Each Other (우린 사랑해선 안됩니다) (feat. Joo Hee of 8eight)	24	KOR: 1,267

=== Extended plays ===
Title	EP details	Peak chart positions
Title	EP details	KOR
30 Minutes Ago	Released: September 8, 2009; Label: Big Hit Entertainment; Formats: CD, digital download; Track listing: 1. 30 Minutes Ago (30분전) (feat. Lim Jeong-hee); 2. The Day We Love Again (다시 사랑하는 날); 3. Since the Heart Doesn't Know (가슴은 모르니까); 4. 30 Minutes Ago (30분전); 5. 30 Minutes Ago (30분전) (Inst.)	—
You Are the Best of My Life	Released: February 15, 2011; Label: Big Hit Entertainment; Formats: CD, digital download; Track listing: 1. You Are the Best of My Life (내꺼중에 최고); 2. Slander (악담); 3. Heartbeat (feat. Song Hee-ran); 4. Bad Girl (feat. Glam & BTS); 5. You Make Me Cry (왜 나를 울려요)	—
A(E)ND	Released: September 16, 2025; Label: Big Hit Music; Formats: CD, digital download; Track listing: 1. Day & Dream; 2. What's On Your Mind; 3. Gravity (우리의 중력) (feat. Song Hayoung of fromis_9); 4. Tree of Life; 5. Let You Go (이쯤에서 널); 6. To Come to See You Pt.2 (너에게 (마중 pt.2))	—
"—" denotes release did not chart.

=== Singles ===
Title	Year	Peak chart positions	Album
Title	Year	KOR	Album
As lead artist
"30 Minutes Ago" (30분전) feat. Lim Jeong-hee	2009	No data*	30 Minutes Ago
"Curse" (악담)	2011	27	You Are the Best of My Life
"You Are the Best of My Life" (내꺼중에 최고)	2011	3	You Are the Best of My Life
"Although You Said So" (다며) feat. Mighty Mouth	2011	11	Non-album single
"Because You Are You" (너니까)	2012	5	The Healing Echo
"Senseless Me" (촌스러워서)	2012	20	Non-album singles
"Your Lips" (입술자국)	2017	—	Non-album singles
"Will There Be a Next Time" (다음이 있을까)	2018	—	Non-album singles
"Not Yet" (아직은)	2019	—	Non-album singles
"Moon in the Ocean" (바닷속의 달)	2021	—	Non-album singles
"Masqueade" (as MIDNATT)	2023	—	Non-album singles
"With You" (그대와)	2025	—	Non-album singles
Collaborations
"Burn" (타버려) with Jeong U	2010	80	Non-album singles
"Heal" with Han Go-eun	2010	—	Non-album singles
"After Losing You" (널 잃고 보니) with Kan Mi-youn	2012	62	Non-album singles
"At the End of the Winter" (겨울 끝에서) with Jang Hee-young	2015	72	Non-album singles
"It's Raining" (비가 내려와) with Zia	2015	42	Non-album singles
"Pretty Bae" (예쁜사람) with Park Bo-ram	2015	53	Non-album singles
"Starlight" with Muzie, Lee Gi-kwang, Joohoney, Chuu, Hyeongjun, and Jeong Yeon Joo)	2021	—	<Muzie-Kwang Company> project album
Soundtrack appearances
"I Can't Breathe" (숨이 막혀)	2009	No data*	Invincible Lee Pyung Kang OST
"You Make Me Cry" (왜 나를 울려요)	2010	66	Big Thing OST
"I call with you" (널 불러본다)	2010		All About Marriage OST
"Best Love" (최고의 사랑)	2012	50	Fashion King OST
"My Heartache" (가슴이 시린 게)	2012	4	A Gentleman's Dignity OST
"Engraved in My Heart" (가슴에 새겨져)	2012	48	The King of Dramas OST
"Though It Hurts, It's Okay" (아파도 괜찮아)	2014	91	Birth of a Beauty OST
"Close My Eyes" (눈을 감아도)	2016	—	Come Back Mister OST
"You Are Love" (그대 사랑)	2016	—	Blow Breeze OST
"Because It's You" (그대라서)	2016	—	Dr. Romantic OST
"You Are Here"	2019	No data*	BTS World: Original Soundtrack OST
"Somebody"	2019	No data*	Joseon Survival Period OST
"Deep Sadness" (깊은 슬픔)	2021	—	Love (ft. Marriage and Divorce) 2 OST
악수	2021	—	아는 여자애 OST
"Only You" (오직, 그대)	2022	—	Eve OST
"—" denotes release did not chart. * The Gaon Digital Chart was launched in 2010. Sales data is not available prior to March 2011.

== Filmography ==
=== Television shows ===
Year	Title	Role	Notes	Ref.
2010–2011	Let's Go! Dream Team Season 2	Contestant		
2015 2018–2019	The King of Mask Singer	Contestant	Episodes 31–32 and 179–180, 188 as "Eagle"	
2023	R U Next?	Coach		

=== Web shows ===
Year	Title	Role	Ref.
2021	Muziekwang Company	Host	

== Theater ==
Year	Title		Role	Venue	Ref.
Year	English	Korean	Role	Venue	Ref.
2023	Dream High	드림하이	Kang Oh-hyeok	BBCH Hall of Gwanglim Art Center	

== Radio ==
Year	Channel	Title		Note
Year	Channel	English	Korean	Note
2024 - 2025	MBC FM4U	My Close Friend Lee Hyun	친한친구 이현입니다	November 25, 2024 – November 20, 2025

== Awards ==
Year	Award-Giving Body	Category	Work	Result
2011	Mnet Asian Music Awards	Best Vocal Solo Performance	"You are the Best of My Life"	Nominated
