= 8Eight =

South Korean vocal group

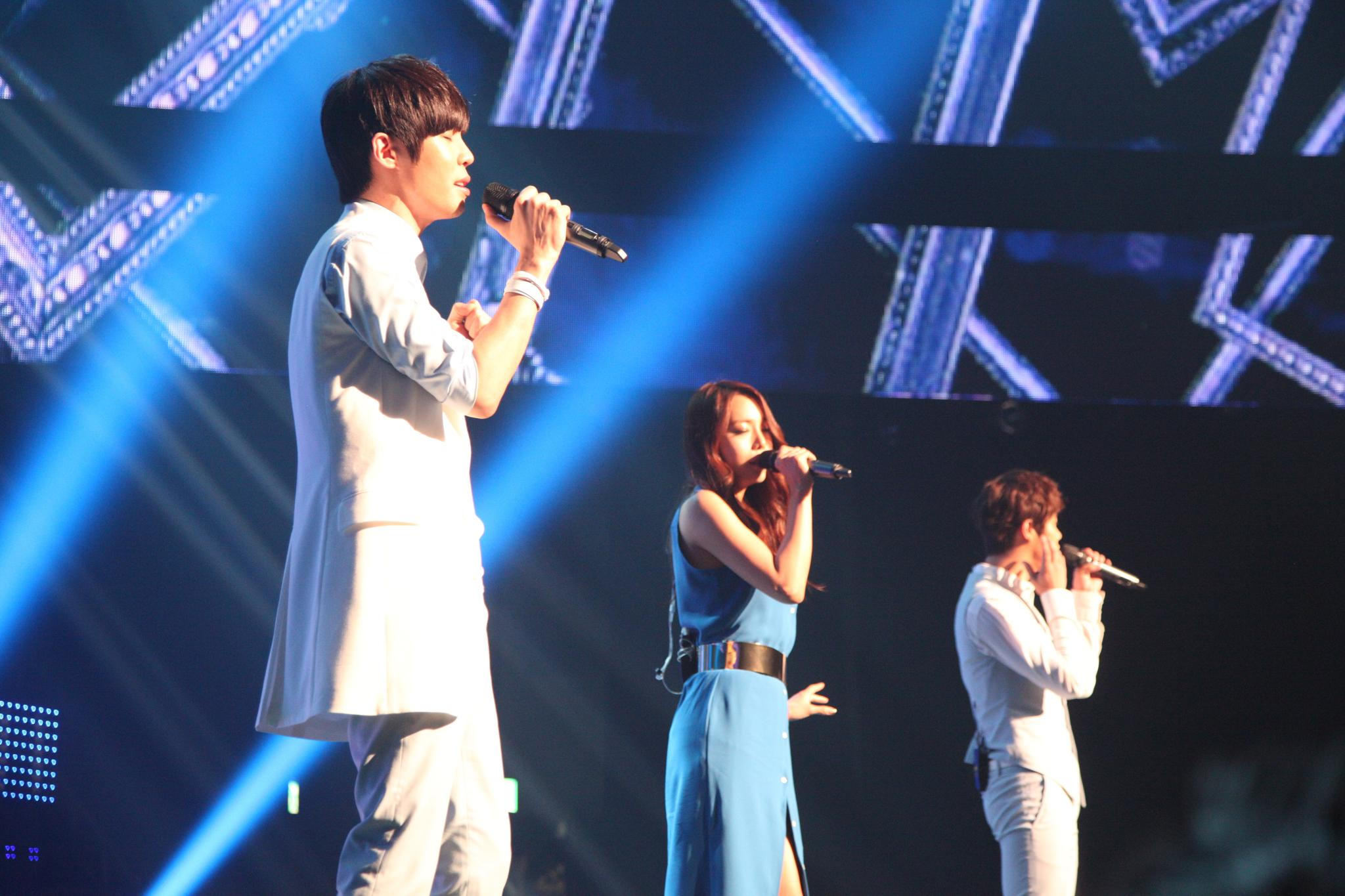
- 8Eight at the Cyworld Dream Music Festival in 2011; From left to right: Lee Hyun, Joo Hee and Baek Chan

Background information
- Origin: South Korea
- Genres: K-pop
- Years active: 2007–2014; 2020
- Labels: Big Hit; Source
- Members: Lee Hyun; Joo Hee; Baek Chan

8Eight (Korean: 에이트) was a South Korean "hybrid" (meaning co-ed) trio group managed by Source Music and produced by Big Hit Entertainment, consisting of Lee Hyun, Joo Hee, and Baek Chan. Active from 2007 to 2014, their last single was "Don't Go Crazy".

== History ==
8Eight won the first season of the television series, MBC’s Show Survival (쇼 서바이벌). They debuted on MBC’s Show! Music Core on August 25, 2007.

On October 8, 2012, member Lee Hyun enlisted for mandatory military service of five weeks of basic training followed by duty as an active soldier for 21 months.

On September 19, 2014, the group released their final single "Don't Go Crazy". They disbanded in December 2014, when contracts with Big Hit Entertainment and Source Music expired.

== Members ==
- Lee Hyun (이현) – male vocalist, leader
- Joo Hee (주희) – female vocalist
- Baek Chan (백찬) – male vocalist, rapper

== Discography ==
=== Studio albums ===
Title	Album details	Peak chart positions	Sales
Title	Album details	KOR	Sales
The First	Released: September 3, 2007; Label: Big Hit Entertainment; Formats: CD; Track listing: 1. Forget Love and Sing (사랑을 잃고 난 노래하네); 2. Can I Love Again (사랑할 수 있을까); 3. Going Insane (미치다); 4. We Cannot Love (우린 사랑해선 안됩니다); 5. If Only One Day Is Left (나에게 하루밖에 없다면) (feat. V.O.S); 6. Come Back (돌아와줘); 7. Hearing My Memory (추억이 들린다); 8. Listen (들어요) (feat. Lim Jeong Hee & K.Will); 9. Between (사이) (feat. Sunye & Yeeun of Wonder Girls and Pdogg); 10. Love All Over the World (세상 가득 사랑을)	19	KOR: 3,217+
Infinity	Released: March 18, 2008; Label: Big Hit Entertainment; Formats: CD; Track listing: 1. Let Me Go; 2. I Love You; 3. Sometin’ Sometin’; 4. One Love; 5. Ask; 6. In The Morning; 7. She Be Here; 8. Me, Ju Hee; 9. One Step; 10. Hanging Your Collar	—N/a	—N/a
Golden Age	Released: March 10, 2009; Label: Big Hit Entertainment; Formats: CD; Track listing: 1. 잘가요 내사랑; 2. 울고 싶어 우는 사람이 있겠어; 3. 이제 슬픈 건 충분해; 4. 마중; 5. 내 삶의 빛 6. 불쌍한 해바라기; 7. 참지마; 8. Numbers; 9. Can’t Stop; 10. 사랑한다면서; 11. 자유; 12. Without A Heart (심장이 없어)	—N/a	—N/a
"—" denotes album did not chart.

=== Extended plays ===
Title	Album details	Peak chart positions	Sales
Title	Album details	KOR	Sales
The Bridge	Released: May 11, 2010; Label: Big Hit Entertainment; Formats: CD, digital download; Track listing: 1. Intro : Love is going (사랑이 가도); 2. The End is Coming (이별이 온다); 3. Even if your face change (얼굴이 바껴도); 4. Star (feat. Changmin & Jinwoon of 2AM); 5. Availability Period (유효기간); 6. Outro : The Bridge	62	—N/a
8Eight	Released: June 21, 2011; Label: Source Music; Formats: CD, digital download; Track listing: 1. Covering your mouth (그 입술을 막아본다); 2. You're really great (그대는 정말 대단해요); 3. Even song can't cure sorrow (노래도 슬픔은 못 고치네); 4. U Make Me Feel Brand New; 5. Dilemma	18	KOR: 1,031+

=== Singles ===
Title	Year	Peak chart positions		Album
Title	Year	KOR Gaon	KOR Hot 100	Album
"I Can Hear the Memories" (추억이 들린다)	2007	No data	No data	The First
"I Love You" feat. Jessica of Girls' Generation	2008	No data	No data	Infinity
"Dala Song" with Park Ki-young & Horan	2008	No data	No data	Non-album singles
"Goodbye My Love" (잘가요 내사랑)	2009	No data	No data	Non-album singles
"No One Cries Because They Want to Date" (울고 싶어 우는 사람이 있겠어)	2009	No data	No data	Non-album singles
"Availability Period" (유효기간)	2010	13	No data	The Bridge
"You're Really Great" (그대는 정말 대단해요)	2011	25	No data	8Eight
"And...Someday" (썸데이...그리고)	2011	28	14	Re:Feel Theme (Various artists compilation)
"Don't Go Crazy" (미치지말자)	2014	13	No data	Non-album singles
"Fool Again" (또 사랑에 속다)	2020	100	No data	Non-album singles

=== Soundtrack appearances ===
Title	Year	Peak chart positions		Album
Title	Year	KOR Gaon	KOR Hot 100	Album
"My Sweet Seoul" (달콤한 나의 도시)	2008	No data	No data	My Sweet Seoul OST
"One Person" (한사람)	2011	22	12	A Thousand Days' Promise OST
"Notebook"	2012	—	58	Salamander Guru and The Shadows OST

== Awards ==
=== Mnet Asian Music Awards ===
Year	Category	Work	Result
2009	Best Mixed Gender Group	"Without a Heart"	Won
2010	Best Group Vocal Performance	"Farewell is Coming"	Nominated
