= Boomerang (The Grace song) =

- "Boomerang" CD Cover

Single by The Grace

from the album One More Time, OK? and Graceful 4
- B-side: "Do You Know? (JP)"
- Released: April 29, 2005 (Korean); January 25, 2006 (Japanese); March 31, 2006 (Chinese)
- Recorded: 2005
- Genre: Dance
- Length: 3:24
- Label: SM (Korean & Chinese); Rhythm Zone (Japanese)
- Composers: Tommy La Verdi; Daniel Pandher; Asle Bergedal; Ahn Ik-soo
- Lyricists: Yoon Hyo-sang (Korean); Hiji Yoko (Japanese)

The Grace singles chronology
"'Too Good'" (2005)	"Boomerang" (2005)	"'The Club'" (2006)

Alternative Cover
- "Boomerang" CD+DVD Cover

Boomerang is a song recorded by South Korean girl group The Grace. The original Korean version was released on April 29, 2005 as a song for their debut single, Too Good.

A Japanese version of the song was released as The Grace's debut single in Japan by Rhythm Zone on January 25, 2006 with two versions : CD and CD+DVD (Limited Edition). The single peaked at #110 on the Oricon Singles Chart and charted for 1 week.

A Chinese version of the song released later along with the other song from their debut single, Too Good, on March 31, 2006.

== Track listing ==
=== CD Only ===
1. "Boomerang"
2. "Do You Know?" feat. Sunday
3. "Boomerang" (Instrumental)
4. "Do You Know?" (Instrumental)

=== CD+DVD ===
==== CD Portion ====
1. "Boomerang"
2. "Do You Know?" feat. Sunday
3. "Boomerang" (Instrumental)
4. "Do You Know?" (Instrumental)

==== DVD Portion ====
1. "Boomerang" Promotion video
2. 天上智喜 Special interview
3. Off shot & making
