= List of King of Mask Singer episodes (2016) =

- No. of episodes: Special Live: 1; Regular: 52

Release
- Original network: MBC
- Original release: January 10 – December 25, 2016

Season chronology
- ← Previous; 2015 Next → 2017

This is a list of episodes of the South Korean variety-music show King of Mask Singer in 2016. The show airs on MBC as part of their Sunday Night lineup. The names listed below are in performance order.

– Contestant is instantly eliminated by the live audience and judging panel
– After being eliminated, contestant performs a prepared song for the next round and takes off their mask during the instrumental break
– After being eliminated and revealing their identity, contestant has another special performance
– Contestant advances to the next round
– Contestant becomes the challenger
– Mask King

== Episodes ==
=== 20th Generation Mask King (cont.) ===
- Contestants : Lim Jeong-hee, Jo Hye-ryun, Kim Nam-joo (Apink), Kihyun (Monsta X), Lee Pil-mo, Kim Tae-won, Im Baek-cheon, Jeon Woo-sung (Noel)
Episode 40

Episode 40

Episode 40 was broadcast on January 3, 2016.

Order	Stage Name	Real Name	Song	Original artist	Vote
Round 2
Pair 1	Rolled Up Good Fortune	Lim Jeong-hee	I Won't Love (사랑 안 해)	Baek Ji-young	51
Pair 1	Tell Them I'm the Dragon King	Kihyun of Monsta X	Moon of Seoul (서울의 달)	Kim Gun-mo	48
Pair 2	Adonis Snowman	Kim Tae-won	Although It is Hateful, Again (미워도 다시 한 번)	Vibe	29
Pair 2	Invincible Bangpai-kite Shield	Jeon Woo-sung of Noel	I Can't (못해)	4Men	70
Round 3
Finalists	Rolled Up Good Fortune	Lim Jeong-hee	Lonely Night	Boohwal	22
Finalists	Invincible Bangpai-kite Shield	Jeon Woo-sung of Noel	Love (사랑)	Yim Jae-beom	77
Final
Battle	Invincible Bangpai-kite Shield	Jeon Woo-sung of Noel	Previous three songs used as voting standard		37
Battle	Amazon Cat-Girl	Cha Ji-yeon	How Love is It (어떻게 사랑이 그래요)	Lee Seung-hwan	62

=== 21st Generation Mask King ===
- Contestants : Shim Shin, Ryeowook (Super Junior), Hwang Je-sung, Jay Park, Kim Jin-woo, Sunyoul (Up10tion), KCM, Dana (The Grace)
Episodes 41 – 42

Episode 41

Episode 41 was broadcast on January 10, 2016. This marks the beginning of the Twenty-first Generation.

Order	Stage Name	Real Name	Song	Original artist	Vote
Round 1
Pair 1	Explosive Emotions Kettle Gentleman	Shim Shin	I Love You	The Position	35
Pair 1	Golden Time of Miracle	Ryeowook of Super Junior	I Love You	The Position	64
2nd Song	Explosive Emotions Kettle Gentleman	Shim Shin	In the Rain (빗속에서)	Lee Moon-sae	–
Special	Explosive Emotions Kettle Gentleman	Shim Shin	You're the Only One (오직 하나뿐인 그대)	Shim Shin	–
Pair 2	Speeding Instinct Cycleman	Hwang Je-sung	Girl (소녀)	Lee Moon-sae	40
Pair 2	Cold City Monkey	Jay Park	Girl (소녀)	Lee Moon-sae	59
2nd Song	Speeding Instinct Cycleman	Hwang Je-sung	Very Old Couples (아주 오래된 연인들)	015B	–
Pair 3	Full of Soul Check It Out	Kim Jin-woo	Born Again (다시 태어나도)	Kim Don-kyoo & Esther (에스더)	48
Pair 3	Most Beauty Uhwudong	Sunyoul of UP10TION	Born Again (다시 태어나도)	Kim Don-kyoo & Esther (에스더)	51
2nd Song	Full of Soul Check It Out	Kim Jin-woo	I Can't Go to Shinchon (신촌을 못 가)	Postmen	–
Pair 4	Catch Flies Farinelli	KCM	Scar Deeper Than Love (사랑보다 깊은 상처)	Yim Jae-beom & Lena Park	52
Pair 4	Heart Racing Snow Queen	Dana of The Grace	Scar Deeper Than Love (사랑보다 깊은 상처)	Yim Jae-beom & Lena Park	47
2nd Song	Heart Racing Snow Queen	Dana of The Grace	Mia (미아)	Lena Park	–

Episode 42

Episode 42 was broadcast on January 17, 2016.

Order	Stage Name	Real Name	Song	Original artist	Vote
Round 2
Pair 1	Golden Time of Miracle	Ryeowook of Super Junior	Meet Him Among (그 중에 그대를 만나)	Lee Sun-hee	61
Pair 1	Cold City Monkey	Jay Park	That I Was Once by Your Side (내가 너의 곁에 잠시 살았다는 걸)	Toy	38
Pair 2	Most Beauty Uhwudong	Sunyoul of UP10TION	Tears	So Chan-whee	25
Pair 2	Catch Flies Farinelli	KCM	Ah! The Old Days (아! 옛날이여)	Lee Sun-hee	74
Round 3
Finalists	Golden Time Of Miracle	Ryeowook of Super Junior	Do You Know (아시나요)	Jo Sung-mo	20
Finalists	Catch Flies Farinelli	KCM	Goodbye for a Moment (잠시만 안녕)	MC the Max	79
Final
Battle	Catch Flies Farinelli	KCM	Previous three songs used as voting standard		43
Battle	Amazon Cat-Girl	Cha Ji-yeon	Swing Baby	Park Jin-young	56

=== 22nd Generation Mask King ===
- Contestants : Kim Yong-jun (SG Wannabe), Jadu (The Jadu), Park Nam-jung, Jun. K (2PM), Ha Hyun-woo (Guckkasten), Park Ji-woo, Wendy (Red Velvet), Ahn Se-ha
Episodes 43 – 44

Episode 43

Episode 43 was broadcast on January 24, 2016. This marks the beginning of the Twenty-second Generation.

Order	Stage Name	Real Name	Song	Original artist	Vote
Round 1
Pair 1	Song Maniac Capable Person	Kim Yong-jun of SG Wannabe	To You My Love (내 사랑 투유)	Jo Gap-kyung ft Hong Seo-beom	52
Pair 1	A Starlit Night	Jadu of The Jadu	To You My Love (내 사랑 투유)	Jo Gap-kyung ft Hong Seo-beom	47
2nd Song	A Starlit Night	Jadu of The Jadu	Like a Rose (그대 모습은 장미)	Min Hae-kyung	–
Pair 2	Baby Frozen Corpse	Park Nam-jung	Draw Goodbye on the Window (유리창에 그린 안녕)	Kim Seung-jin	38
Pair 2	Dream of the Square	Jun. K of 2PM	Draw Goodbye on the Window (유리창에 그린 안녕)	Kim Seung-jin	61
2nd Song	Baby Frozen Corpse	Park Nam-jung	Don't Say Goodbye (안녕이라고 말하지 마)	Lee Seung-chul	–
Special	Baby Frozen Corpse	Park Nam-jung	Missing You (널 그리며)	Park Nam-jung	–
Pair 3	Music Captain of Our Local	Ha Hyun-woo of Guckkasten	I Like Saturday Night (토요일은 밤이 좋아)	Kim Jong-chan	79
Pair 3	I'm the One National	Park Ji-woo	I Like Saturday Night (토요일은 밤이 좋아)	Kim Jong-chan	20
2nd Song	I'm the One National	Park Ji-woo	Sad Promise (슬픈 언약식)	Kim Jung-min	–
Pair 4	Space Beauty Maetel	Wendy of Red Velvet	Fate (운명)	Travel Sketch	46
Pair 4	Search for Mom Cheori	Ahn Se-ha	Fate (운명)	Travel Sketch	53
2nd Song	Space Beauty Maetel	Wendy of Red Velvet	Late Regret (늦은 후회)	Bobo	–

Episode 44

Episode 44 was broadcast on January 31, 2016.

Order	Stage Name	Real Name	Song	Original artist	Vote
Round 2
Pair 1	Song Maniac Capable Person	Kim Yong-jun of SG Wannabe	Those Days (그 날들)	Kim Kwang-seok	45
Pair 1	Dream of the Square	Jun. K of 2PM	Mom (엄마)	Ra.D	54
Pair 2	Music Captain of Our Local	Ha Hyun-woo of Guckkasten	Freshwater Eel's Dream (민물 장어의 꿈)	Shin Hae-chul	62
Pair 2	Search for Mom Cheori	Ahn Se-ha	While Looking at the Picture (사진을 보다가)	Vibe	37
Round 3
Finalists	Dream of the Square	Jun. K of 2PM	Rain	Lee Juck	8
Finalists	Music Captain of Our Local	Ha Hyun-woo of Guckkasten	Lazenca, Save Us	NEXT	91
Final
Battle	Amazon Cat-Girl	Cha Ji-yeon	The Covered Up Road (가리워진 길)	Yoo Jae-ha	22
Battle	Music Captain of Our Local	Ha Hyun-woo of Guckkasten	Previous three songs used as voting standard		77

=== 23rd Generation Mask King ===
- Contestants : Niel (Teen Top), Lizzy (After School/Orange Caramel), Jo Kwan-woo, Lee Bong-won, Yang Geum-seok, Ahn So-mi, Kangin (Super Junior), Tei
Episodes 45 – 46

Episode 45

Episode 45 was broadcast on February 7, 2016. This marks the beginning of the Twenty-third Generation.

Order	Stage Name	Real Name	Song	Original artist	Vote
Opening	Lee Ae-ran		Life of a Century (백세인생 (개사))	Lee Ae-ran	–
Round 1
Pair 1	Get Married Gapdol	Niel of Teen Top	Jjan Jja Ra (짠짜라)	Jang Yoon-jeong	53
Pair 1	Get Married Gapsoon	Lizzy of After School/Orange Caramel	Jjan Jja Ra (짠짜라)	Jang Yoon-jeong	46
2nd Song	Get Married Gapsoon	Lizzy of After School/Orange Caramel	Password 486 (비밀번호 486)	Younha	–
Pair 2	Go Big or Go Home	Jo Kwanwoo	At Any Time (무시로)	Na Hoon-a	73
Pair 2	Ace in Wonderland	Lee Bong-won	At Any Time (무시로)	Na Hoon-a	26
2nd Song	Ace in Wonderland	Lee Bong-won	Ddaeng Beol (땡벌)	Kang Jin	–
Pair 3	Keep Watching with the Eyes of a Hawk	Yang Geum-seok	Secret Love (몰래한 사랑)	Kim Ji-ae	41
Pair 3	Cheongsachorong of Love	Ahn So-mi	Secret Love (몰래한 사랑)	Kim Ji-ae	58
2nd Song	Keep Watching with the Eyes of a Hawk	Yang Geum-seok	Toy Soldiers (장난감 병정)	Park Kang-sung	–
Pair 4	Make a Fortune	Kangin of Super Junior	Ok Kyung I (옥경이)	Tae Jin-ah	43
Pair 4	Gaksul Who Came Last Year	Tei	Ok Kyung I (옥경이)	Tae Jin-ah	56
2nd Song	Make a Fortune	Kangin of Super Junior	Tearful (암연)	Go Han-woo	–

Episode 46

Episode 46 was broadcast on February 14, 2016.

Order	Stage Name	Real Name	Song	Original artist	Vote
Round 2
Pair 1	Get Married Gapdol	Niel of Teen Top	I Have a Girlfriend (난 여자가 있는데)	Park Jin-young	45
Pair 1	Go Big or Go Home	Jo Kwanwoo	The Magic Castle (마법의 성)	The Classic	54
Pair 2	Cheongsachorong of Love	Ahn So-mi	You so Far Away (그대 먼 곳에)	Heart to Heart (마음과 마음)	21
Pair 2	Gaksul Who Came Last Year	Tei	For Thousand Days (천 일 동안)	Lee Seung-hwan	78
Round 3
Finalists	Go Big or Go Home	Jo Kwanwoo	The One Who Gives Me Happiness (행복을 주는 사람)	Sunflower	34
Finalists	Gaksul Who Came Last Year	Tei	Don't Go Today (오늘은 가지마)	Im Se-joon	65
Final
Battle	Gaksul Who Came Last Year	Tei	Previous three songs used as voting standard		38
Battle	Music Captain of Our Local	Ha Hyun-woo of Guckkasten	Don't Worry (걱정 말아요 그대)	Jeon In-kwon	61

=== 24th Generation Mask King ===
- Contestants : Jo Hang-jo, Shin Go-eun, Hani (EXID), Kim Feel, Sojung (Ladies' Code), Lee Tae-sung, Kim Dong-myeong (Boohwal), Miljenko Matijevic (Steelheart)
Episodes 47 – 48

Episode 47

Episode 47 was broadcast on February 21, 2016. This marks the beginning of the Twenty-fourth Generation.

Order	Stage Name	Real Name	Song	Original artist	Vote
Round 1
Pair 1	Revival Back to the Future	Jo Hang-jo	Don't Forget Me (나를 잊지 말아요)	Kim Hee-ae	51
Pair 1	A Good Friend When You Meet MBig	Shin Go-eun	Don't Forget Me (나를 잊지 말아요)	Kim Hee-ae	48
2nd Song	A Good Friend When You Meet MBig	Shin Go-eun	Ruby (루비)	Fin.K.L	–
Pair 2	Be Careful for Cold the Little Match Girl	Hani of EXID	Snail (달팽이)	Panic	52
Pair 2	A Greasy Butterfly	Kim Feel	Snail (달팽이)	Panic	47
2nd Song	A Greasy Butterfly	Kim Feel	Time Walking on Memory (기억을 걷는 시간)	Nell	–
Special	A Greasy Butterfly	Kim Feel	If You Love Again (다시 사랑한다면)	Do Won-kyung	–
Pair 3	Our Night Your Lose Yourself Beautiful	Sojung of Ladies' Code	The Blue in You (그대 안의 블루)	Kim Hyun-chul & Lee So-ra	59
Pair 3	Want to Fly Flying Boy	Lee Tae-sung	The Blue in You (그대 안의 블루)	Kim Hyun-chul & Lee So-ra	40
2nd Song	Want to Fly Flying Boy	Lee Tae-sung	Family Picture (가족사진)	Kim Jin-ho	–
Pair 4	Go Global	Kim Dong-myung of Boohwal	Creep	Radiohead	47
Pair 4	A Quiet Sort of Lightning Man	Miljenko Matijevic of Steelheart	Creep	Radiohead	52
2nd Song	Go Global	Kim Dong-myung of Boohwal	The Rhapsody of Rain (비의 랩소디)	Choi Jae-hoon	–

Episode 48

Episode 48 was broadcast on February 28, 2016.

Order	Stage Name	Real Name	Song	Original artist	Vote
Round 2
Pair 1	Revival Back to the Future	Jo Hang-jo	It Will Pass (지나간다)	Kim Bum-soo	31
Pair 1	Be Careful for Cold the Little Match Girl	Hani of EXID	Honey	Park Jin-young	68
Pair 2	Our Night Your Lose Yourself Beautiful	Sojung of Ladies' Code	If You Come Back (그대 돌아오면)	Gummy	43
Pair 2	A Quiet Sort of Lightning Man	Miljenko Matijevic of Steelheart	The Story of the Rain and You (비와 당신의 이야기)	Boohwal	56
3rd Song	Our Night Your Lose Yourself Beautiful	Sojung of Ladies' Code	That's Only My World (그것만이 내 세상)	Deulgukhwa	–
Round 3
Finalists	Be Careful for Cold the Little Match Girl	Hani of EXID	Love Is (사랑은)	Leessang & Choi Jung-in	53
Finalists	A Quiet Sort of Lightning Man	Miljenko Matijevic of Steelheart	Confession (고해)	Yim Jae-beom	46
Special	A Quiet Sort of Lightning Man	Miljenko Matijevic of Steelheart	She's Gone	Steelheart	–
Final
Battle	Be Careful for Cold the Little Match Girl	Hani of EXID	Previous three songs used as voting standard		19
Battle	Music Captain of Our Local	Ha Hyun-woo of Guckkasten	Fantastic Baby	BigBang	80

=== 25th Generation Mask King ===
- Contestants : Kwon Seon-kook (Green Area), Youme, Hyolyn (Sistar), Jung In-young, Rich, Leo (VIXX), Park Ji-heon (V.O.S), Kim Dong-ho
Episodes 49 – 50

Episode 49

Episode 49 was broadcast on March 6, 2016. This marks the beginning of the Twenty-fifth Generation.

Order	Stage Name	Real Name	Song	Original artist	Vote
Round 1
Pair 1	Super Hero	Kwon Seon-kook of Green Area	For Now (이제는)	Seoul Family	47
Pair 1	Snow White of Venom	Youme	For Now (이제는)	Seoul Family	52
2nd Song	Super Hero	Kwon Seon-kook of Green Area	Wind Wind Wind (바람 바람 바람)	Kim Beom-ryong	–
Pair 2	Here Comes the Spring Girl	Hyolyn of Sistar	Tell Me, Tell Me	S#arp	78
Pair 2	Sweet Lollipop	Jung In-young	Tell Me, Tell Me	S#arp	21
2nd Song	Sweet Lollipop	Jung In-young	Violet Fragrance (보랏빛 향기)	Kang Susie	–
Pair 3	A Jewelry Box in My Heart	Rich	The Last Game (마지막 승부)	Kim Min-kyo	45
Pair 3	Heungbu Be Stifled	Leo of VIXX	The Last Game (마지막 승부)	Kim Min-kyo	54
2nd Song	A Jewelry Box in My Heart	Rich	Eyes, Nose, Lips (눈, 코, 입)	Taeyang	–
Pair 4	Puppet Pinocchio	Park Ji-heon of V.O.S	Doll (인형)	Lee Ji-hoon & Shin Hye-sung	58
Pair 4	A Train to the World	Kim Dong-ho	Doll (인형)	Lee Ji-hoon & Shin Hye-sung	41
2nd Song	A Train to the World	Kim Dong-ho	I'm a Loner (외톨이야)	CNBLUE	–

Episode 50

Episode 50 was broadcast on March 13, 2016.

Order	Stage Name	Real Name	Song	Original artist	Vote
Round 2
Pair 1	Snow White of Venom	Youme	I Will Be Love Everything (모두 다 사랑하리)	Songolmae	46
Pair 1	Here Comes the Spring Girl	Hyolyn of Sistar	Sorry (미안해요)	Kim Gun-mo	53
Pair 2	Heungbu Be Stifled	Leo of VIXX	To Heaven	Jo Sung-mo	35
Pair 2	Puppet Pinocchio	Park Ji-heon of V.O.S	Again, Today I (오늘도 난)	Lee Seung-chul	64
Round 3
Finalists	Here Comes the Spring Girl	Hyolyn of Sistar	The Rainy Season (장마)	Choi Jung-in	52
Finalists	Puppet Pinocchio	Park Ji-heon of V.O.S	After the Love Has Gone (사랑한 후에)	Deulgukhwa	47
Final
Battle	Here Comes the Spring Girl	Hyolyn of Sistar	Previous three songs used as voting standard		32
Battle	Music Captain of Our Local	Ha Hyun-woo of Guckkasten	Don't Cry	The Cross	67

=== 26th Generation Mask King ===
- Contestants : Song So-hee, Shim Mina, Kang Jun-woo (Rose Motel), Choi Sung-won, Kim Jeong-hoon (UN), Kim Bo-hyung (Spica), Choi Jae-hoon, Lee Jong-beom
Episodes 51 – 52

Episode 51

Episode 51 was broadcast on March 20, 2016. This marks the beginning of the Twenty-sixth Generation.

Order	Stage Name	Real Name	Song	Original artist	Vote
Round 1
Pair 1	You Are the Where Have Some Fun Dancing All Night	Song So-hee	Rough (Running Through Time) (시간을 달려서)	GFriend	61
Pair 1	Honjeo Calligraphy Option Ms.Jeju	Shim Mina	Rough (Running Through Time) (시간을 달려서)	GFriend	38
2nd Song	Honjeo Calligraphy Option Ms.Jeju	Shim Mina	Love for Night	Lee Ji-yeon	–
Pair 2	Protect the Earth	Kang Joon-woo of Rose Motel	It's Love (사랑인걸)	Mose	48
Pair 2	I'm on the Green Grass in the Meadow	Choi Sung-won	It's Love (사랑인걸)	Mose	51
2nd Song	Protect the Earth	Kang Joon-woo of Rose Motel	Sadness Guide (슬픔 활용법)	Kim Bum-soo	–
Pair 3	The Man in the Flower	Kim Jeong-hoon of UN	All for You	Cool	39
Pair 3	Space Agent Number Seven	Kim Bo-hyung of SPICA	All for You	Cool	60
2nd Song	The Man in the Flower	Kim Jeong-hoon of UN	Long After a Parting (오랜 이별 뒤에)	Shin Seung-hun	–
Pair 4	A Forced Crash-Landing of Love	Choi Jae-hoon	Walk to the Sky (걸어서 하늘까지)	Jang Hyun-chul	83
Pair 4	Fly a Cute Little Chick	Lee Jong-beom	Walk to the Sky (걸어서 하늘까지)	Jang Hyun-chul	16
2nd Song	Fly a Cute Little Chick	Lee Jong-beom	Waiting for the Pain (기다리는 아픔)	Cho Yong-pil	–

Episode 52

Episode 52 was broadcast on March 27, 2016.

Order	Stage Name	Real Name	Song	Original artist	Vote
Round 2
Pair 1	You Are the Where Have Some Fun Dancing All Night	Song So-hee	Father (아버지)	Insooni	52
Pair 1	I'm on the Green Grass in the Meadow	Choi Sung-won	Fly (날아)	Lee Seung-yeol	47
3rd Song	I'm on the Green Grass in the Meadow	Choi Sung-won	Heenari (Wet Firewood) (희나리)	Koo Chang-mo	–
Pair 2	Space Agent Number Seven	Kim Bo-hyung of SPICA	In the Dream (꿈에)	Lena Park	53
Pair 2	A Forced Crash-Landing of Love	Choi Jae-hoon	My Own Grief (나만의 슬픔)	Kim Don-kyoo	46
Round 3
Finalists	You Are the Where Have Some Fun Dancing All Night	Song So-hee	You and I	Park Bom	40
Finalists	Space Agent Number Seven	Kim Bo-hyung of SPICA	Don't Live Like That (넌 그렇게 살지마)	Park Mi-kyung	59
Final
Battle	Space Agent Number Seven	Kim Bo-hyung of SPICA	Previous three songs used as voting standard		24
Battle	Music Captain of Our Local	Ha Hyun-woo of Guckkasten	Spring Rain (봄비)	Park In-soo	75

=== 27th Generation Mask King ===
- Contestants : Lee Min-woo (Shinhwa), Choi Phillip, Han Dong-geun, Heyne, Choi Hyun-seok, Tim, Yoon Yoo-sun, WoongSan
Episodes 53 – 54

Episode 53

Episode 53 was broadcast on April 3, 2016. This marks the beginning of the Twenty-seventh Generation.

Order	Stage Name	Real Name	Song	Original artist	Vote
Round 1
Pair 1	Sanchoman of Passion Carbonara	Lee Min-woo of Shinhwa	Just Like That (그대로 그렇게)	FEVERS (휘버스)	56
Pair 1	A Little Indian Boy	Choi Phillip	Just Like That (그대로 그렇게)	FEVERS (휘버스)	43
2nd Song	A Little Indian Boy	Choi Phillip	Missing You (널 그리며)	Park Nam-jung	–
Pair 2	Use Your Vote on April 13	Han Dong-geun	When Would It Be (언제쯤이면)	Yoon Hyun-sang & IU	65
Pair 2	Flames of Desire	HEYNE	When Would It Be (언제쯤이면)	Yoon Hyun-sang & IU	34
2nd Song	Flames of Desire	HEYNE	Confession (고백)	Park Hye-kyung	–
Pair 3	Genius Trans Poker Face	Choi Hyun-seok	Flying, Deep in the Night (깊은 밤을 날아서)	Lee Moon-sae	21
Pair 3	You to Enjoy Life a Champion	Tim	Flying, Deep in the Night (깊은 밤을 날아서)	Lee Moon-sae	78
2nd Song	Genius Trans Poker Face	Choi Hyun-seok	Endure (차마)	Sung Si-kyung	–
Pair 4	Storm and Stress Adolescent Girls	Yoon Yoo-sun	When the Cold Wind Blows (찬바람이 불면)	Kim Ji-yeon	22
Pair 4	Bohemian Rhapsody	WoongSan	When the Cold Wind Blows (찬바람이 불면)	Kim Ji-yeon	77
2nd Song	Storm and Stress Adolescent Girls	Yoon Yoo-sun	Belief (믿음)	Lee So-ra	–

Episode 54

Episode 54 was broadcast on April 10, 2016.

Order	Stage Name	Real Name	Song	Original artist	Vote
Round 2
Pair 1	Sanchoman of Passion Carbonara	Lee Min-woo of Shinhwa	Kiss Me	Park Jin-young	32
Pair 1	Use Your Vote on April 13	Han Dong-geun	Shout Me (나를 외치다)	Maya	67
Pair 2	You to Enjoy Life a Champion	Tim	Lie Lie Lie (거짓말 거짓말 거짓말)	Lee Juck	48
Pair 2	Bohemian Rhapsody	WoongSan	Crooked (삐딱하게)	Kang San-eh	51
3rd Song	You to Enjoy Life a Champion	Tim	Proposal (청혼)	Noel	–
Round 3
Finalists	Use Your Vote on April 13	Han Dong-geun	Butterfly (나비야)	Ha Dong-kyun	61
Finalists	Bohemian Rhapsody	WoongSan	Drinking (술이야)	Vibe	38
Final
Battle	Use Your Vote on April 13	Han Dong-geun	Previous three songs used as voting standard		21
Battle	Music Captain of Our Local	Ha Hyun-woo of Guckkasten	Hayeoga (하여가)	Seo Taiji and Boys	78

=== 28th Generation Mask King ===
- Contestants : Wheein (Mamamoo), Won Mi-yeon, Onejunn (Boys Republic), Kim Myung-hoon (Ulala Session), Yesung (Super Junior), Shoo (S.E.S.), Mose, Son Byong-ho
Episodes 55 – 56

Episode 55

Episode 55 was broadcast on April 17, 2016. This marks the beginning of the Twenty-eighth Generation.

Order	Stage Name	Real Name	Song	Original artist	Vote
Round 1
Pair 1	Like a Half Moon	Wheein of Mamamoo	I Don't Know Yet What Love Is (난 사랑을 아직 몰라)	Lee Ji-yeon	61
Pair 1	Kimchi Cheese Smile	Won Mi-yeon	I Don't Know Yet What Love Is (난 사랑을 아직 몰라)	Lee Ji-yeon	38
2nd Song	Kimchi Cheese Smile	Won Mi-yeon	First Impression (첫 인상)	Kim Gun-mo	–
Pair 2	Oh! Chandelier	Onejunn of Boys Republic	Don't Go, Don't Go (가지마 가지마)	Brown Eyes	40
Pair 2	Express Roller Coaster	Kim Myung-hoon of Ulala Session	Don't Go, Don't Go (가지마 가지마)	Brown Eyes	59
2nd Song	Oh! Chandelier	Onejunn of Boys Republic	With Me	Wheesung	–
Pair 3	Can You Believe It Magic Castle	Yesung of Super Junior	Just the Way We Love (우리 사랑 이대로)	Joo Young-hoon & Lee Hye-jin	64
Pair 3	There is No Failure on My Life	Shoo of S.E.S.	Just the Way We Love (우리 사랑 이대로)	Joo Young-hoon & Lee Hye-jin	35
2nd Song	There is No Failure on My Life	Shoo of S.E.S.	Love is as Like a Fragile Glass (사랑은 유리 같은 것)	Won Joon-hee	–
Pair 4	Four-dimensional Andromeda	Mose	Somebody's Dream (어떤 이의 꿈)	Bom Yeoreum Gaeul Kyeoul	63
Pair 4	Solomon's Choice	Son Byong-ho	Somebody's Dream (어떤 이의 꿈)	Bom Yeoreum Gaeul Kyeoul	36
2nd Song	Solomon's Choice	Son Byong-ho	Lose Where Go My Mind (내 마음 갈 곳을 잃어)	Choi Baek-ho	–

Episode 56

Episode 56 was broadcast on April 24, 2016.

Order	Stage Name	Real Name	Song	Original artist	Vote
Round 2
Pair 1	Like a Half Moon	Wheein of Mamamoo	Who's Your Mama? (어머님이 누구니)	Park Jin-young	37
Pair 1	Express Roller Coaster	Kim Myung-hoon of Ulala Session	Ways to Avoid the Sun (태양을 피하는 방법)	Rain	62
Pair 2	Can You Believe It Magic Castle	Yesung of Super Junior	I Do	The One	52
Pair 2	Four-dimensional Andromeda	Mose	Endless	Flower	47
Round 3
Finalists	Express Roller Coaster	Kim Myung-hoon of Ulala Session	For Your Soul (슬픈 영혼식)	Jo Sung-mo	70
Finalists	Can You Believe It Magic Castle	Yesung of Super Junior	People Are More Beautiful Than Flowers (사람이 꽃보다 아름다워)	An Chi-hwan	29
Final
Battle	Express Roller Coaster	Kim Myung-hoon of Ulala Session	Previous three songs used as voting standard		46
Battle	Music Captain of Our Local	Ha Hyun-woo of Guckkasten	An Invitation to Daily Life (일상으로의 초대)	Shin Hae-chul	53

=== 29th Generation Mask King ===
- Contestants : Lee Yoon-mi, Kim Hyun-sook, Kim Tae-woo (g.o.d), Sleepy (Untouchable), Lee Hyun-woo, Byun Jae-won, Yangpa, Hwang Seung-eon
Episodes 57 – 58

Episode 57

Episode 57 was broadcast on May 1, 2016. This marks the beginning of the Twenty-ninth Generation.

Order	Stage Name	Real Name	Song	Original artist	Vote
Round 1
Pair 1	Mirrors Are Also Not Looking Girl	Lee Yoon-mi	One's Way Back (귀로)	Park Seon-joo	46
Pair 1	Sweet Tooth for Chocolate	Kim Hyun-sook	One's Way Back (귀로)	Park Seon-joo	53
2nd Song	Mirrors Are Also Not Looking Girl	Lee Yoon-mi	Rose of Betrayal (배반의 장미)	Uhm Jung-hwa	–
Pair 2	Slam Dunk	Kim Tae-woo of g.o.d	After Send You (너를 보내고)	Yoon Do-hyun	58
Pair 2	Kung Fu Panda	Sleepy of Untouchable	After Send You (너를 보내고)	Yoon Do-hyun	41
2nd Song	Kung Fu Panda	Sleepy of Untouchable	Left-handed (왼손잡이)	Panic	–
Pair 3	The Lord of the Night Bat Man	Lee Hyun-woo	Instinctively (본능적으로)	Yoon Jong-shin	55
Pair 3	I Would Be a Spider	Byun Jae-won	Instinctively (본능적으로)	Yoon Jong-shin	44
2nd Song	I Would Be a Spider	Byun Jae-won	Two People (두 사람)	Sung Si-kyung	–
Pair 4	Mysterious Wonder Woman	Yangpa	HaHaHa Song (하하하쏭)	Jaurim	67
Pair 4	Sailor Moon of Justice	Hwang Seung-eon	HaHaHa Song (하하하쏭)	Jaurim	32
2nd Song	Sailor Moon of Justice	Hwang Seung-eon	Distant Memories of You (기억 속의 먼 그대에게)	Park Mi-kyung	–

Episode 58

Episode 58 was broadcast on May 8, 2016.

Order	Stage Name	Real Name	Song	Original artist	Vote
Round 2
Pair 1	Sweet Tooth for Chocolate	Kim Hyun-sook	Beautiful Country (아름다운 강산)	Lee Sun-hee	21
Pair 1	Slam Dunk	Kim Tae-woo of g.o.d	Like Rain, Like Music (비처럼 음악처럼)	Kim Hyun-sik	78
Pair 2	The Lord of the Night Bat Man	Lee Hyun-woo	It is Love (사랑이야)	Song Chang-sik	39
Pair 2	Mysterious Wonder Woman	Yangpa	Gangnam Style (강남스타일)	Psy	60
Round 3
Finalists	Slam Dunk	Kim Tae-woo of g.o.d	While We Live in This World (이 세상 살아가다 보면)	Lee Moon-sae	46
Finalists	Mysterious Wonder Woman	Yangpa	The Wind is Blowing (바람이 분다)	Lee So-ra	53
Final
Battle	Mysterious Wonder Woman	Yangpa	Previous three songs used as voting standard		33
Battle	Music Captain of Our Local	Ha Hyun-woo of Guckkasten	Waiting Everyday (매일 매일 기다려)	T△S	66

=== 30th Generation Mask King ===
- Contestants : Park Bo-ram, Subin (Dal Shabet), Kim Young-ji, Kim Kiri, Kim Min-seok, Oh Chang-seok, Jo Sung-hwan (Yukgaksu), Kim Kyung-ho
Episodes 59 – 60

Episode 59

Episode 59 was broadcast on May 15, 2016. This marks the beginning of the Thirtieth Generation.

Order	Stage Name	Real Name	Song	Original artist	Vote
Round 1
Pair 1	I Am Completely Shrill-Voiced	Park Bo-ram	I Love You Even Though I Hate You (미워도 사랑하니까)	Davichi	64
Pair 1	Lady First	Subin of Dal Shabet	I Love You Even Though I Hate You (미워도 사랑하니까)	Davichi	35
2nd Song	Lady First	Subin of Dal Shabet	To Ignore (무시로)	Na Hoon-a	–
Pair 2	Life of a Century	Kim Young-ji	My Friend (친구여)	Cho PD & Insooni	56
Pair 2	I'm Fine Thank You	Kim Kiri	My Friend (친구여)	Cho PD & Insooni	43
2nd Song	I'm Fine Thank You	Kim Kiri	You Don't Know (니가 모르게)	Loco	–
Pair 3	The Sun's Junior	Kim Min-seok	I'll Get Over You (잊을게)	YB	58
Pair 3	A Feisty Little Prince	Oh Chang-seok	I'll Get Over You (잊을게)	YB	41
2nd Song	A Feisty Little Prince	Oh Chang-seok	I'll Become Dust (먼지가 되어)	Lee Miki	–
Pair 4	Fishing Management Tentacle	Jo Sung-hwan of Yukgaksu	Superman (슈퍼맨)	Norazo	25
Pair 4	The Lamp Genie	Kim Kyung-ho	Superman (슈퍼맨)	Norazo	74
2nd Song	Fishing Management Tentacle	Jo Sung-hwan of Yukgaksu	It's Art (예술이야)	Psy	–

Episode 60

Episode 60 was broadcast on May 22, 2016.

Order	Stage Name	Real Name	Song	Original artist	Vote
Round 2
Pair 1	I Am Completely Shrill-Voiced	Park Bo-ram	A Guy Like Me (나란놈이란)	Im Chang-jung	32
Pair 1	Life of a Century	Kim Young-ji	You Are My Everything	Gummy	67
Pair 2	The Sun's Junior	Kim Min-seok	Can't Do (못해)	4Men & Mi (美)	26
Pair 2	The Lamp Genie	Kim Kyung-ho	Forever (영원)	Choi Jin-young	73
Round 3
Finalists	Life of a Century	Kim Young-ji	Even If You Get Cheated by World (세상이 그대를 속일지라도)	Kim Jang-hoon	36
Finalists	The Lamp Genie	Kim Kyung-ho	Sun (해야)	Magma	63
Final
Battle	The Lamp Genie	Kim Kyung-ho	Previous three songs used as voting standard		43
Battle	Music Captain of Our Local	Ha Hyun-woo of Guckkasten	One Million Roses (백만 송이 장미)	Sim Soo-bong	56

=== 31st Generation Mask King ===
- Contestants : Kim Kyung-rok (V.O.S), Kang Ji-sub, Yoon Bo-mi (Apink), Bada (S.E.S.), Seo Shin-ae, Yoo Seung-woo, Yoon Hong-hyun (Big Brain), The One
Episodes 61 – 62

Episode 61

Episode 61 was broadcast on May 29, 2016. This marks the beginning of the Thirty-first Generation.

Order	Stage Name	Real Name	Song	Original artist	Vote
Round 1
Pair 1	Street Musician	Kim Kyung-rok of V.O.S	Like Those Powerful Salmons That Come Against the River (거꾸로 강을 거슬러 오르는저 힘찬 연어들처럼)	Kang San-eh	68
Pair 1	Mr. Kim an Artist	Kang Ji-sub	Like Those Powerful Salmons That Come Against the River (거꾸로 강을 거슬러 오르는저 힘찬 연어들처럼)	Kang San-eh	31
2nd Song	Mr. Kim an Artist	Kang Ji-sub	The Road to Me (내게 오는 길)	Sung Si-kyung	–
Pair 2	Pretty Rabbit Girl Barney Barney	Yoon Bo-mi of Apink	Lonely	2NE1	42
Pair 2	My Love is My Bride	Bada of S.E.S.	Lonely	2NE1	57
2nd Song	Pretty Rabbit Girl Barney Barney	Yoon Bo-mi of Apink	Atlantis Princess (아틀란티스 소녀)	BoA	–
Pair 3	Masked Assassin	Seo Shin-ae	You and I, Fluttering (그대와 나, 설레임)	Acoustic Collabo & Soulman	16
Pair 3	Tightrope Life the King's Man	Yoo Seung-woo	You and I, Fluttering (그대와 나, 설레임)	Acoustic Collabo & Soulman	83
2nd Song	Masked Assassin	Seo Shin-ae	As You Live (살다 보면)	Cha Ji-yeon	–
Pair 4	Fairy Song Baramdori	Yoon Hong-hyun of Big Brain	If You Come into My Heart (그대 내 맘에 들어오면은)	Jo Deok-bae	48
Pair 4	An Out-and-Out Escape	The One	If You Come into My Heart (그대 내 맘에 들어오면은)	Jo Deok-bae	51
2nd Song	Fairy Song Baramdori	Yoon Hong-hyun of Big Brain	Bongsook (봉숙이)	Rose Motel	–

Episode 62

Episode 62 was broadcast on June 5, 2016.

Order	Stage Name	Real Name	Song	Original artist	Vote
Round 2
Pair 1	Street Musician	Kim Kyung-rok of V.O.S	Lifetime (일생을)	Kim Hyun-chul	39
Pair 1	My Love is My Bride	Bada of S.E.S.	Growl (으르렁)	Exo	60
Pair 2	Tightrope Life the King's Man	Yoo Seung-woo	Is There Anybody? (누구 없소)	Han Young-ae	45
Pair 2	An Out-and-Out Escape	The One	Love Actually (들었다 놨다)	Daybreak	54
Round 3
Finalists	My Love is My Bride	Bada of S.E.S.	Wild Flower (야생화)	Park Hyo-shin	16
Finalists	An Out-and-Out Escape	The One	Nocturne (녹턴)	Lee Eun-mi	83
Final
Battle	Music Captain of Our Local	Ha Hyun-woo of Guckkasten	Very Old Couples (아주 오래된 연인들)	015B	33
Battle	An Out-and-Out Escape	The One	Previous three songs used as voting standard		66

=== 32nd Generation Mask King ===
- Contestants : Hyelin (EXID), Crush, L (Infinite), Parc Jae-jung, Lee Sung-woo (No Brain), Seomoon Tak, Son Jin-young, Lee Sang-min (Roo'ra)
Episodes 63 – 64

Episode 63

Episode 63 was broadcast on June 12, 2016. This marks the beginning of the Thirty-second Generation.

Order	Stage Name	Real Name	Song	Original artist	Vote
Opening	Music Captain of Our Local	Ha Hyun-woo of Guckkasten	Pulse	Guckkasten	–
Round 1
Pair 1	Cheerleader in Victory	Hyelin of EXID	You to Me Again (그대 내게 다시)	Byun Jin-sub	39
Pair 1	Overseas Musician Michol	Crush	You to Me Again (그대 내게 다시)	Byun Jin-sub	60
2nd Song	Cheerleader in Victory	Hyelin of EXID	If I Leave (나 가거든)	Sumi Jo	–
Pair 2	I'm Your Father	L of INFINITE	Go Get Her (그녀를 잡아요)	Carnival	38
Pair 2	Captain Korea	Parc Jae-jung	Go Get Her (그녀를 잡아요)	Carnival	61
2nd Song	I'm Your Father	L of INFINITE	In the Rain (빗속에서)	Lee Moon-sae	–
Pair 3	Serengeti with Wild	Lee Sung-woo of No Brain	Forgotten Flower (못 다 핀 꽃 한 송이)	Kim Soo-chul	43
Pair 3	The Dream of Dolphins	Seomoon Tak	Forgotten Flower (못 다 핀 꽃 한 송이)	Kim Soo-chul	56
2nd Song	Serengeti with Wild	Lee Sung-woo of No Brain	Side Road (골목길)	Shinchon Blues	–
Pair 4	The Legendary Catcher Baekdusan	Son Jin-young	Champion (챔피언)	Psy	52
Pair 4	Rational Reason Apollo	Lee Sang-min of Roo'ra	Champion (챔피언)	Psy	47
2nd Song	Rational Reason Apollo	Lee Sang-min of Roo'ra	Spring Days of My Life (내 생애 봄날은)	Can	–

Episode 64

Episode 64 was broadcast on June 19, 2016.

Order	Stage Name	Real Name	Song	Original artist	Vote
Round 2
Pair 1	Overseas Musician Michol	Crush	You Are My Lady	Jungyup	31
Pair 1	Captain Korea	Parc Jae-jung	Do You Want to Walk with Me (같이 걸을까)	Lee Juck	68
Pair 2	The Dream of Dolphins	Seomoon Tak	Childish Adult (어른 아이)	Gummy	77
Pair 2	The Legendary Catcher Baekdusan	Son Jin-young	When You Are... (너 그럴때면...)	Eve	22
Round 3
Finalists	Captain Korea	Parc Jae-jung	As Time Goes By (세월이 가면)	Choi Ho-seop	25
Finalists	The Dream of Dolphins	Seomoon Tak	Turn on the Radio Loudly (크게 라디오를 켜고)	Sinawe	74
Final
Battle	The Dream of Dolphins	Seomoon Tak	Previous three songs used as voting standard		40
Battle	An Out-and-Out Escape	The One	Addicted Love (중독된 사랑)	Jo Jang-hyuk	59

=== 33rd Generation Mask King ===
- Contestants : Sung Jin-woo, Stephanie (The Grace), Jo Hyun-ah (Urban Zakapa), Exy (WJSN), Roy Kim, Gong Seo-young, Kim Bo-sung, Kang Sung-hoon (Sechs Kies)
Episodes 65 – 66

Episode 65

Episode 65 was broadcast on June 26, 2016. This marks the beginning of the Thirty-third Generation.

Order	Stage Name	Real Name	Song	Original artist	Vote
Round 1
Pair 1	Weekly Idol	Sung Jin-woo	The Day After You Left (헤어진 다음 날)	Lee Hyun-woo	27
Pair 1	Video Tour of Departure	Stephanie of The Grace	The Day After You Left (헤어진 다음 날)	Lee Hyun-woo	72
2nd Song	Weekly Idol	Sung Jin-woo	One Love (하나의 사랑)	Park Sang-min	–
Pair 2	Femme Fatale	Jo Hyun-ah of Urban Zakapa	On a Saturday Night (토요일 밤에)	Son Dam-bi	78
Pair 2	Come Back Home	EXY of Cosmic Girls	On a Saturday Night (토요일 밤에)	Son Dam-bi	21
2nd Song	Come Back Home	EXY of Cosmic Girls	Daring Women (당돌한 여자)	Seo Joo-kyung	–
Pair 3	Romantic the Dark Knight	Roy Kim	Smile Boy	Lee Seung-gi & Yuna Kim	86
Pair 3	The Beach Lady	Gong Seo-young	Smile Boy	Lee Seung-gi & Yuna Kim	13
2nd Song	The Beach Lady	Gong Seo-young	So That There's No Goodbye (이별이 오지 못하게)	Page	–
Pair 4	AI Jjippa	Kim Bo-sung	Prince of the Sea (바다의 왕자)	Park Myung-soo	34
Pair 4	Oscar, Beautiful Night	Kang Sung-hoon of Sechs Kies	Prince of the Sea (바다의 왕자)	Park Myung-soo	65
2nd Song	AI Jjippa	Kim Bo-sung	How Fortunate (참 다행이야)	S.papa	–

Episode 66

Episode 66 was broadcast on July 3, 2016.

Order	Stage Name	Real Name	Song	Original artist	Vote
Round 2
Pair 1	Video Tour of Departure	Stephanie of The Grace	1.2.3.4	Lee Hi	47
Pair 1	Femme Fatale	Jo Hyun-ah of Urban Zakapa	Smiling Angel (미소천사)	Sung Si-kyung	52
Pair 2	Romantic the Dark Knight	Roy Kim	Love Always Run Away (사랑은 늘 도망가)	Lee Moon-sae	66
Pair 2	Oscar, Beautiful Night	Kang Sung-hoon of Sechs Kies	For a Long Time After That (그 후로 오랫동안)	Shin Seung-hun	33
Round 3
Finalists	Femme Fatale	Jo Hyun-ah of Urban Zakapa	Things That I Can't Do for You (해줄 수 없는 일)	Park Hyo-shin	42
Finalists	Romantic the Dark Knight	Roy Kim	Please (제발)	Deulgukhwa	57
Final
Battle	An Out-and-Out Escape	The One	Good Day (좋은 날)	IU	39
Battle	Romantic the Dark Knight	Roy Kim	Previous three songs used as voting standard		60

=== 34th Generation Mask King ===
- Contestants : Yoon Hyung-ryul, Boom, In Ho-jin (Sweet Sorrow), Esther, Park Ha-na, Eunha (GFriend), Rumble Fish (singer) (Rumble Fish), Lee Jae-yong
Episodes 67 – 68

Episode 67

Episode 67 was broadcast on July 10, 2016. This marks the beginning of the Thirty-fourth Generation.

Order	Stage Name	Real Name	Song	Original artist	Vote
Round 1
Pair 1	Janggi and Faces	Yoon Hyung-ryul	Snail (달팽이)	Panic	67
Pair 1	Black and White Chessman	Boom	Snail (달팽이)	Panic	32
2nd Song	Black and White Chessman	Boom	Guilty (죽일 놈)	Dynamic Duo	–
Pair 2	Tough Elvis	In Ho-jin of Sweet Sorrow	Man and Woman (남과 여)	Park Seon-joo & Kim Bum-soo	41
Pair 2	Sexy Monroe	Esther	Man and Woman (남과 여)	Park Seon-joo & Kim Bum-soo	58
2nd Song	Tough Elvis	In Ho-jin of Sweet Sorrow	Scattered Days (흩어진 나날들)	Kang Susie	–
Pair 3	SOS Sea Rescuer	Park Ha-na	Je T'aime	Hey	49
Pair 3	Fresh Santorini	Eunha of GFriend	Je T'aime	Hey	50
2nd Song	SOS Sea Rescuer	Park Ha-na	I Fell in Love (난 사랑에 빠졌죠)	Park Ji-yoon	–
Pair 4	Finding Your Aunt	Choi Jin-yi of Rumble Fish	A Cup of Coffee (커피 한 잔)	Pearl Sisters	78
Pair 4	Trail of Memories Taffy Peddler	Lee Jae-yong	A Cup of Coffee (커피 한 잔)	Pearl Sisters	21
2nd Song	Trail of Memories Taffy Peddler	Lee Jae-yong	Red Roses on Wednesdays (수요일엔 빨간 장미를)	Five Fingers	–

Episode 68

Episode 68 was broadcast on July 17, 2016.

Order	Stage Name	Real Name	Song	Original artist	Vote
Round 2
Pair 1	Janggi and Faces	Yoon Hyung-ryul	Distant Memories of You (기억 속의 먼 그대에게)	Park Mi-kyung	56
Pair 1	Sexy Monroe	Esther	Heaven	Ailee	43
Pair 2	Fresh Santorini	Eunha of GFriend	I Have to Forget You (슬픔 속에 그댈 지워야만 해)	Lee Hyun-woo	20
Pair 2	Finding Your Aunt	Choi Jin-yi of Rumble Fish	Everyone (여러분)	Yoon Bok-hee	79
Round 3
Finalists	Janggi and Faces	Yoon Hyung-ryul	The Flight (비상)	Yim Jae-beom	46
Finalists	Finding Your Aunt	Choi Jin-yi of Rumble Fish	Unreasonable Reason (이유 같지 않은 이유)	Park Mi-kyung	53
Final
Battle	Finding Your Aunt	Choi Jin-yi of Rumble Fish	Previous three songs used as voting standard		47
Battle	Romantic the Dark Knight	Roy Kim	Piled Up with Longing (그리움만 쌓이네)	Yeojin	52

=== 35th Generation Mask King ===
- Contestants : Son Ho-young (g.o.d), Lee Dong-yoon, Jihyo (Twice), DK (singer) (Seventeen), Kim Min-woo, JeA (Brown Eyed Girls), Kim Yeon-ji (SeeYa), Seo Yu-ri
Episodes 69 – 70

Episode 69

Episode 69 was broadcast on July 24, 2016. This marks the beginning of the Thirty-fifth Generation.

Order	Stage Name	Real Name	Song	Original artist	Vote
Round 1
Pair 1	Treasure Island Mive on My Own	Son Hoyoung of g.o.d	Soul Mates (천생연분)	Solid	52
Pair 1	Mom Said Every Male a Wolf	Lee Dong-yoon	Soul Mates (천생연분)	Solid	47
2nd Song	Mom Said Every Male a Wolf	Lee Dong-yoon	Spring Days (봄날)	Kim Yong-jin	–
Pair 2	You Hold Me, Little Ghost	Jihyo of Twice	Dream	Suzy & Baekhyun	48
Pair 2	Pots of Gold, Baby Demon	DK of SEVENTEEN	Dream	Suzy & Baekhyun	51
2nd Song	You Hold Me, Little Ghost	Jihyo of Twice	Like an Indian Doll (인디언 인형처럼)	Na-mi	–
Pair 3	The Plane Carrying the Meals, Beef or Chicken	Kim Min-woo	Farewell Story (이별 이야기)	Lee Moon-sae & Go Eun-hee	40
Pair 3	Bangkok Friends Fan	JeA of Brown Eyed Girls	Farewell Story (이별 이야기)	Lee Moon-sae & Go Eun-hee	59
2nd Song	The Plane Carrying the Meals, Beef or Chicken	Kim Min-woo	Laura (로라)	Byun Jin-sub	–
Pair 4	Bulgwang-dong Gasoline	Kim Yeon-ji of SeeYa	Nice to Meet You (잘 부탁드립니다)	EX	73
Pair 4	Siberia Lent the Igloo	Seo Yu-ri	Nice to Meet You (잘 부탁드립니다)	EX	26
2nd Song	Siberia Lent the Igloo	Seo Yu-ri	Romantic Cat (낭만 고양이)	Cherry Filter	–

Episode 70

Episode 70 was broadcast on July 31, 2016.

Order	Stage Name	Real Name	Song	Original artist	Vote
Round 2
Pair 1	Treasure Island Mive on My Own	Son Hoyoung of g.o.d	I Love You (사랑합니다)	Tim	37
Pair 1	Pots of Gold, Baby Demon	DK of SEVENTEEN	Moon's Fall (달의 몰락)	Kim Hyun-chul	62
Pair 2	Bangkok Friends Fan	JeA of Brown Eyed Girls	Dash	Baek Ji-young	23
Pair 2	Bulgwang-dong Gasoline	Kim Yeon-ji of SeeYa	How Are You (어떤가요)	Lee Jeong-bong	76
Round 3
Finalists	Pots of Gold, Baby Demon	DK of SEVENTEEN	Fate (인연)	Lee Seung-chul	25
Finalists	Bulgwang-dong Gasoline	Kim Yeon-ji of SeeYa	We're Breaking Up (헤어지는 중입니다)	Lee Eun-mi	74
Final
Battle	Romantic the Dark Knight	Roy Kim	Confession (고해)	Yim Jae-beom	44
Battle	Bulgwang-dong Gasoline	Kim Yeon-ji of SeeYa	Previous three songs used as voting standard		55

=== 36th Generation Mask King ===
- Contestants : Hong Jong-gu (Noise), Lee Sung-bae, Kim Shin-eui (Monni), Kim Seon-kyung, Lady Jane, Jung Kook (BTS), Bong Man-dae, Jung Dong-ha
Episodes 71 – 72

Episode 71

Episode 71 was broadcast on August 7, 2016. This marks the beginning of the Thirty-sixth Generation.

Order	Stage Name	Real Name	Song	Original artist	Vote
Round 1
Pair 1	The 88 Olympic Games Hodori	Hong Jong-goo of Noise	Love Leaves It's Scent (사랑은... 향기를 남기고)	Tei	52
Pair 1	Rio Olympic Mascots Vinicius	Lee Sung-bae	Love Leaves It's Scent (사랑은... 향기를 남기고)	Tei	47
2nd Song	Rio Olympic Mascots Vinicius	Lee Sung-bae	Flaming Sunset (붉은 노을)	Lee Moon-sae	–
Pair 2	Rear Cattle the Altair	Kim Shin-eui of Monni	Lying on the Sea (바다에 누워)	Treble Clef	66
Pair 2	Loom Weaving the Vega	Kim Seon-kyung	Lying on the Sea (바다에 누워)	Treble Clef	33
2nd Song	Loom Weaving the Vega	Kim Seon-kyung	Heartburn (가슴앓이)	One Mind (한마음)	–
Pair 3	Archery Girl at the 10 Points Out of 10	Lady Jane	I'm in Love	Ra.D	40
Pair 3	Fencing Man	Jungkook of BTS	I'm in Love	Ra.D	59
2nd Song	Archery Girl at the 10 Points Out of 10	Lady Jane	Start (시작)	Park Ki-young	–
Pair 4	Don't Put the Music Please DJ	Bong Man-dae	Don't Give Up (포기하지 마)	Sung Jin-woo	21
Pair 4	Get Excited Eheradio	Jung Dong-ha	Don't Give Up (포기하지 마)	Sung Jin-woo	78
2nd Song	Don't Put the Music Please DJ	Bong Man-dae	Oh! What a Shiny Night (밤이 깊었네)	Crying Nut	–

Episode 72

Episode 72 was broadcast on August 14, 2016.

Order	Stage Name	Real Name	Song	Original artist	Vote
Round 2
Pair 1	The 88 Olympic Games Hodori	Hong Jong-goo of Noise	Short Hair (단발머리)	Cho Yong-pil	34
Pair 1	Rear Cattle the Altair	Kim Shin-eui of Monni	UFO	Panic	65
Pair 2	Fencing Man	Jungkook of BTS	If You	BigBang	31
Pair 2	Get Excited Eheradio	Jung Dong-ha	Love (사랑)	Yim Jae-beom	68
Round 3
Finalists	Rear Cattle the Altair	Kim Shin-eui of Monni	For You Who Knows About My Pain (내 아픔 아시는 당신께)	Jo Ha-moon	22
Finalists	Get Excited Eheradio	Chung Dong-ha	Peppermint Candy (박하사탕)	YB	77
Final
Battle	Bulgwang-dong Gasoline	Kim Yeon-ji of SeeYa	Miss, Miss and Miss (그립고 그립고 그립다)	K.Will	41
Battle	Get Excited Eheradio	Chung Dong-ha	Previous three songs used as voting standard		58

=== 37th Generation Mask King ===
- Contestants : Hwayobi, Yoon Hae-young, Heo Young-saeng (SS501/Double S 301), Soy Kim, Lee Won-suk (Daybreak), Jeong Jin-woon (2AM), Woo Ji-won, Nam Sang-il
Episodes 73 – 74

Episode 73

Episode 73 was broadcast on August 21, 2016. This marks the beginning of the Thirty-seventh Generation.

Order	Stage Name	Real Name	Song	Original artist	Vote
Round 1
Pair 1	Your Lady Ride Flower Palanquin	Hwayobi	Seabirds (바다새)	Seabirds (바다새)	77
Pair 1	12 O'clock Curfew Pumpkin Carriage	Yoon Hae-young	Seabirds (바다새)	Seabirds (바다새)	22
2nd Song	12 O'clock Curfew Pumpkin Carriage	Yoon Hae-young	Love is Like a Raindrop of Outside the Windows (사랑은 창밖에 빗물 같아요)	Yang Soo-kyung	–
Pair 2	It is a Very Lonely	Heo Young-saeng of SS501/Double S 301	Perhaps Love (사랑인가요)	J.ae & Howl (하울)	68
Pair 2	A Full Belly Counsels Well	Soy	Perhaps Love (사랑인가요)	J.ae & Howl (하울)	31
2nd Song	A Full Belly Counsels Well	Soy	Hey Hey Hey	Jaurim	–
Pair 3	Mobius Strip	Lee Won-seok of Daybreak	You in My Faded Memories (흐린 기억 속의 그대)	Hyun Jin-young	56
Pair 3	One Wins Plus Singer King Minus	Jeong Jinwoon of 2AM	You in My Faded Memories (흐린 기억 속의 그대)	Hyun Jin-young	43
2nd Song	One Wins Plus Singer King Minus	Jeong Jinwoon of 2AM	Entertainers (연예인)	Psy	–
Pair 4	Watercolor of Rainy Day	Woo Ji-won	Dream (꿈)	Lee Hyun-woo	30
Pair 4	Freezing Dumpling Unfreeze	Nam Sang-il	Dream (꿈)	Lee Hyun-woo	69
2nd Song	Watercolor of Rainy Day	Woo Ji-won	Sparks (불티)	Jeon Young-rok	–

Episode 74

Episode 74 was broadcast on August 28, 2016.

Order	Stage Name	Real Name	Song	Original artist	Vote
Round 2
Pair 1	Your Lady Ride Flower Palanquin	Hwayobi	Scent of You (그대의 향기)	Yoo Young-jin	54
Pair 1	It is a Very Lonely	Heo Young-saeng of SS501/Double S 301	Hello	Huh Gak	45
Special	It is a Very Lonely	Heo Young-saeng of SS501/Double S 301	To Her Love (그녀의 연인에게)	K2	–
Pair 2	Freezing Dumpling Unfreeze	Nam Sang-il	Mother (사모곡)	Tae Jin-ah	42
Pair 2	Mobius Strip	Lee Won-seok of Daybreak	I Am a Man (난 남자다)	Kim Jang-hoon	57
Round 3
Finalists	Your Lady Ride Flower Palanquin	Hwayobi	A Guy Like Me... (나란 놈이란...)	Im Chang-jung	26
Finalists	Mobius Strip	Lee Won-seok of Daybreak	Sad Beatrice (슬픈 베아트리체)	Cho Yong-pil	73
Final
Battle	Mobius Strip	Lee Won-seok of Daybreak	Previous three songs used as voting standard		40
Battle	Get Excited Eheradio	Chung Dong-ha	Footsteps (발걸음)	Emerald Castle	59

=== 38th Generation Mask King ===
- Contestants : Horan (Clazziquai Project), Gyeongree (Nine Muses), Son Heon-soo, Seo Eun-kwang (BtoB), Heo Jung-min, Kim Tae-hyun (DickPunks), Kai, Kim Joon-seon
Episodes 75 – 76

Episode 75

Episode 75 was broadcast on September 4, 2016. This marks the beginning of the Thirty-eighth Generation.

Order	Stage Name	Real Name	Song	Original artist	Vote
Round 1
Pair 1	A Young Lady of Literary Interests	Horan of Clazziquai	A-ing (아잉♡)	Orange Caramel	64
Pair 1	Autumn Fragrance from Stranger	Gyeongree of Nine Muses	A-ing (아잉♡)	Orange Caramel	35
2nd Song	Autumn Fragrance from Stranger	Gyeongree of Nine Muses	Diary of Mother (엄마의 일기)	Wax	–
Pair 2	Sparta Seokbong Mother	Son Heon-soo	You in My Imagination (상상속의 너)	Noise	31
Pair 2	Tonight I'm Afraid of Darkness, Seokbong	Seo Eunkwang of BtoB	You in My Imagination (상상속의 너)	Noise	68
2nd Song	Sparta Seokbong Mother	Son Heon-soo	Requiem (진혼)	Yada	–
Pair 3	Returning Home in Glory on the Way Home	Heo Jung-min	I Love You (사랑합니다)	Lee Jae-hoon	37
Pair 3	Love is Something That Comes Back! Top Boy	Kim Tae-hyun of DickPunks	I Love You (사랑합니다)	Lee Jae-hoon	62
2nd Song	Returning Home in Glory on the Way Home	Heo Jung-min	Highway Romance (고속도로 Romance)	Yoon Jong-shin	–
Pair 4	Am I Look Like Straw Bag as I Keep Still	KAI	The Age of the Cathedrals (대성당들의 시대)	Musical Notre-Dame de Paris OST	65
Pair 4	Gizzard Shad Left Daughter-in-law	Kim Joon-seon	The Age of the Cathedrals (대성당들의 시대)	Musical Notre-Dame de Paris OST	34
2nd Song	Gizzard Shad Left Daughter-in-law	Kim Joon-seon	Toward Tomorrow (내일을 향해)	Shin Sung-woo	–

Episode 76

Episode 76 was broadcast on September 11, 2016.

Order	Stage Name	Real Name	Song	Original artist	Vote
Round 2
Pair 1	A Young Lady of Literary Interests	Horan of Clazziquai	Rapids (개여울)	Jung Mi-jo	40
Pair 1	Tonight I'm Afraid of Darkness, Seokbong	Seo Eunkwang of BtoB	The Wind is Blowing (바람이 분다)	Lee So-ra	59
Pair 2	Love is Something That Comes Back! Top Boy	Kim Tae-hyun of DickPunks	I'll Be There	Eve	43
Pair 2	Am I Look Like Straw Bag as I Keep Still	KAI	Last Concert (마지막 콘서트)	Lee Seung-chul	56
Round 3
Finalists	Tonight I'm Afraid of Darkness, Seokbong	Seo Eunkwang of BtoB	Tears (눈물)	Flower	37
Finalists	Am I Look Like Straw Bag as I Keep Still	KAI	Drunken Truth (취중진담)	Exhibition	62
Final
Battle	Am I Look Like Straw Bag as I Keep Still	KAI	Previous three songs used as voting standard		28
Battle	Get Excited Eheradio	Chung Dong-ha	Mirotic (주몬-MIROTIC-)	TVXQ	71

=== 39th Generation Mask King ===
- Contestants : CNU (B1A4), Solbi, Huh Gak, Kim So-yeon, NC.A, Riaa, Lee Jae-hoon (Cool), Jung Sung-ho
Episodes 77 – 78

Episode 77

Episode 77 was broadcast on September 18, 2016. This marks the beginning of the Thirty-ninth Generation.

Order	Stage Name	Real Name	Song	Original artist	Vote
Round 1
Pair 1	I'm a Star Lobster	CNU of B1A4	Caution (경고)	Tashannie (타샤니)	41
Pair 1	Noryangjin Little Mermaid	Solbi	Caution (경고)	Tashannie (타샤니)	58
2nd Song	I'm a Star Lobster	CNU of B1A4	Once Again This Night (이 밤을 다시 한 번)	Jo Ha-moon	–
Pair 2	Robin Hood of Justice	Huh Gak	For Couples Just Begun (시작되는 연인들을 위해)	Lee Won-jin & Ryu Geum-deok (류금덕)	72
Pair 2	Nice to Meet You Squirrel	Kim So-yeon	For Couples Just Begun (시작되는 연인들을 위해)	Lee Won-jin & Ryu Geum-deok (류금덕)	27
2nd Song	Nice to Meet You Squirrel	Kim So-yeon	Nocturne (야상곡)	Kim Yoon-ah	–
Pair 3	Don't Forget Me a Forget-me-not	NC.A	Singing Got Better (노래가 늘었어)	Ailee	56
Pair 3	Honey Ddari Sha Bah Rah	Riaa	Singing Got Better (노래가 늘었어)	Ailee	43
2nd Song	Honey Ddari Sha Bah Rah	Riaa	Breakup with Her (그녀와의 이별)	Kim Hyun-jung	–
Pair 4	Hey Watch, You Better Sing a Song	Lee Jae-hoon of Cool	The Man in Yellow Shirt (노란 샤쓰의 사나이)	Han Myung-sook	73
Pair 4	Life's One Shot Bowling Man	Jung Sung-ho	The Man in Yellow Shirt (노란 샤쓰의 사나이)	Han Myung-sook	26
2nd Song	Life's One Shot Bowling Man	Jung Sung-ho	Fly, Chick (날아라 병아리)	NEXT	–

Episode 78

Episode 78 was broadcast on September 25, 2016.

Order	Stage Name	Real Name	Song	Original artist	Vote
Round 2
Pair 1	Noryangjin Little Mermaid	Solbi	All You Need is Love (사미인곡)	Seomoon Tak	29
Pair 1	Robin Hood of Justice	Huh Gak	A Flying Butterfly (나는 나비)	YB	70
Pair 2	Don't Forget Me a Forget-me-not	NC.A	The Lost Umbrella (잃어버린 우산)	Woo Soon-sil	40
Pair 2	Hey Watch, You Better Sing a Song	Lee Jae-hoon of Cool	Unpredictable Life (알 수 없는 인생)	Lee Moon-sae	59
Round 3
Finalists	Robin Hood of Justice	Huh Gak	As We Live (살다가)	SG Wannabe	58
Finalists	Hey Watch, You Better Sing a Song	Lee Jae-hoon of Cool	Landscape Painting in the Street (풍경화 속의 거리)	Park Gwang-hyun (박광현)	41
Final
Battle	Robin Hood of Justice	Huh Gak	Previous three songs used as voting standard		43
Battle	Get Excited Eheradio	Chung Dong-ha	Don't Leave by My Side (내 곁에서 떠나가지 말아요)	The Light and Salt	56

=== 40th Generation Mask King ===
- Contestants : Choi Jung-won, Bae Jong-ok, Kim Gook-hwan, Ahn Ji-hwan, Kwak Hee-sung, Yeeun (Wonder Girls), Seulgi (Red Velvet), Ali
Episodes 79 – 80

Episode 79

Episode 79 was broadcast on October 2, 2016. This marks the beginning of the Fortieth Generation.

Order	Stage Name	Real Name	Song	Original artist	Vote
Round 1
Pair 1	Anne of Green Gables	Choi Jung-won	Pink Lipstick (분홍 립스틱)	Kang Aerija	73
Pair 1	Heidi, Girl of the Alps	Bae Jong-ok	Pink Lipstick (분홍 립스틱)	Kang Aerija	26
2nd Song	Heidi, Girl of the Alps	Bae Jong-ok	You Let Me Go with a Smile (미소를 띄우며 나를 보낸 그 모습처럼)	Lee Eun-ha	–
Pair 2	My Song May Be Surprised	Kim Gook-hwan	Why Calling (왜 불러)	Song Chang-sik	56
Pair 2	You Are on the a Little Higher Than Me Hikingman	Ahn Ji-hwan	Why Calling (왜 불러)	Song Chang-sik	43
2nd Song	You Are on the a Little Higher Than Me Hikingman	Ahn Ji-hwan	It's Fortunate (다행이다)	Lee Juck	–
Pair 3	I Will Be with You Unconditionally Bodyguard	Kwak Hee-sung	It's You (그대네요)	Sung Si-kyung and IU	49
Pair 3	What a Diamond Sexy Diva	Yeeun of Wonder Girls	It's You (그대네요)	Sung Si-kyung and IU	50
2nd Song	I Will Be with You Unconditionally Bodyguard	Kwak Hee-sung	Two People (두 사람)	Sung Si-kyung	–
Pair 4	Masterpiece of the Weekend, Cinema Heaven	Seulgi of Red Velvet	Tell Me Your Wish (Genie) (소원을 말해봐 (Genie))	Girls' Generation	41
Pair 4	Ready to Order, Popcorn Girl	Ali	Tell Me Your Wish (Genie) (소원을 말해봐 (Genie))	Girls' Generation	58
2nd Song	Masterpiece of the Weekend, Cinema Heaven	Seulgi of Red Velvet	Turning the Pages of Memories (추억의 책장을 넘기면)	Lee Sun-hee	–

Episode 80

Episode 80 was broadcast on October 9, 2016.

Order	Stage Name	Real Name	Song	Original artist	Vote
Round 2
Pair 1	Anne of Green Gables	Choi Jung-won	Walk to the Sky (걸어서 하늘까지)	Jang Hyun-chul	57
Pair 1	My Song May Be Surprised	Kim Gook-hwan	Passionate Love (열애)	Yoon Shi-nae	42
Special	My Song May Be Surprised	Kim Gook-hwan	Galaxy Express 999 (Korean version) (은하철도 999)	Galaxy Express 999 OST	–
Pair 2	What a Diamond Sexy Diva	Yeeun of Wonder Girls	Re-Bye	AKMU	25
Pair 2	Ready to Order, Popcorn Girl	Ali	See-through (씨스루)	Primary & Gaeko & Zion.T	74
Round 3
Finalists	Anne of Green Gables	Choi Jung-won	Don't Forget (잊지 말아요)	Baek Ji-young	17
Finalists	Ready to Order, Popcorn Girl	Ali	Where Are You (그대는 어디에)	Yim Jae-beom	82
Final
Battle	Get Excited Eheradio	Chung Dong-ha	Growing (꽃이 핀다)	K.Will	36
Battle	Ready to Order, Popcorn Girl	Ali	Previous three songs used as voting standard		63

=== Special Live 2016: Your Choice! King of Mask Singer ===
- Contestants : Sandeul (B1A4), Dana (The Grace), Hyun Jin-young, KCM, Lee Jae-eun, Lee Ji-hoon, Younha, Lim Jeong-hee
Special Live 2016

The special live broadcast aired on October 5, 2016, as part of the DMC Festival. This was a special edition that brought back contestants that had been eliminated in previous episodes, and a special Mask King was chosen from live voting. Sandeul was able to perform as a challenger in Episode 84.

Order	Stage Name	Real Name	Song	Original artist	Vote Ratio
Round 1
Pair 1	Heart Attack Cupid	Sandeul of B1A4	Aloha (아로하)	Cool	69%
Pair 1	Pitapat Scale Paralysis	Dana of The Grace	Aloha (아로하)	Cool	31%
2nd Song	Pitapat Scale Paralysis	Dana of The Grace	Cheer Up	Twice	–
Pair 2	Baby Deer's Joints Were Very Lively	Hyun Jin-young	You That Meet Unexpectedly (어쩌다 마주친 그대)	Songgolmae	34%
Pair 2	Bang! Bang! Gunman	KCM	You That Meet Unexpectedly (어쩌다 마주친 그대)	Songgolmae	66%
2nd Song	Baby Deer's Joints Were Very Lively	Hyun Jin-young	I'm Going Out (나도야 간다)	Kim Soo-chul	–
Pair 3	Poppy Lives Alone	Lee Jae-eun	Beautiful Goodbye (아름다운 이별)	Kim Gun-mo	17%
Pair 3	The Count's Neck is Open	Lee Ji-hoon	Beautiful Goodbye (아름다운 이별)	Kim Gun-mo	83%
2nd Song	Poppy Lives Alone	Lee Jae-eun	Fate (인연)	Lee Sun-hee	–
Pair 4	Man is a Pear, She is an Apple	Younha	Deviation (일탈)	Jaurim	36%
Pair 4	Quit Isn’t in My Vocabulary, Prohibit Resignation	Lim Jeong-hee	Deviation (일탈)	Jaurim	64%
2nd Song	Man is a Pear, She is an Apple	Younha	Twinkle	Girls' Generation-TTS	–
Round 2
Pair 1	Heart Attack Cupid	Sandeul of B1A4	No.1	BoA	64% (4500)
Pair 1	Bang! Bang! Gunman	KCM	My Everything (내 모든 것)	Seo Taiji and Boys	36% (2511)
Pair 2	The Count's Neck is Open	Lee Ji-hoon	Already Sad Love (이미 슬픈 사랑)	Yada	48% (3924)
Pair 2	Quit Isn’t in My Vocabulary, Prohibit Resignation	Lim Jeong-hee	Maria	Kim Ah-joong	52% (4258)
Battle
Finalists	Heart Attack Cupid	Sandeul of B1A4	After Love (후애)	M.N.J (엠엔제이)	58% (6506)
Finalists	Quit Isn’t in My Vocabulary, Prohibit Resignation	Lim Jeong-hee	Memory of the Wind (바람기억)	Naul	42% (4669)

=== 41st Generation Mask King ===
- Contestants : Soyou (Sistar), Seo Ha-joon, Kim Hak-do, Lee Jin-sung (Monday Kiz), Hong Dae-kwang, Lee Ji-hye (S#arp), Park Jin-joo, Lee Sun-bin
Episodes 81 – 82

Episode 81

Episode 81 was broadcast on October 16, 2016. This marks the beginning of the Forty-first Generation.

Order	Stage Name	Real Name	Song	Original artist	Vote
Round 1
Pair 1	Pushing and Pulling Fairy Tinker Bell	Soyou of Sistar	My Lips Warm Like Coffee (내 입술 따뜻한 커피처럼)	S#arp	69
Pair 1	Adults Don't Know Peter Pan	Seo Ha-joon	My Lips Warm Like Coffee (내 입술 따뜻한 커피처럼)	S#arp	30
2nd Song	Adults Don't Know Peter Pan	Seo Ha-joon	In the Shade of the Street Tree (가로수 그늘 아래 서면)	Lee Moon-sae	–
Pair 2	Who Push the Leaning Tower of Pisa	Kim Hak-do	Beautiful Restriction (아름다운 구속)	Kim Jong-seo	25
Pair 2	Lovers in Paris Eiffel Tower	Lee Jin-sung of Monday Kiz	Beautiful Restriction (아름다운 구속)	Kim Jong-seo	74
2nd Song	Who Push the Leaning Tower of Pisa	Kim Hak-do	You're The Only One (오직 하나뿐인 그대)	Shim Shin	–
Pair 3	Secret Royal Inspector's Appearance	Hong Dae-kwang	What is Love (Another Miss Oh OST) (사랑이 뭔데)	Seo Hyun-jin & Yoo Seung-woo	61
Pair 3	This is Unfair Miss Chunhyang	Lee Ji-hye of S#arp	What is Love (Another Miss Oh OST) (사랑이 뭔데)	Seo Hyun-jin & Yoo Seung-woo	38
2nd Song	This is Unfair Miss Chunhyang	Lee Ji-hye of S#arp	Last Love (마지막 사랑)	Park Ki-young	–
Pair 4	Rain in the Sky Raincoat Girl	Park Jin-joo	Flying Duck (오리 날다)	Cherry Filter	59
Pair 4	Don't Eat and Make Away a Confectionary	Lee Sun-bin	Flying Duck (오리 날다)	Cherry Filter	40
2nd Song	Don't Eat and Make Away a Confectionary	Lee Sun-bin	Alcohol (술이야)	Vibe	–

Episode 82

Episode 82 was broadcast on October 23, 2016.

Order	Stage Name	Real Name	Song	Original artist	Vote
Round 2
Pair 1	Pushing and Pulling Fairy Tinker Bell	Soyou of Sistar	8282	Davichi	28
Pair 1	Lovers in Paris Eiffel Tower	Lee Jin-sung of Monday Kiz	No Matter Where (어디에도)	MC the Max	71
Pair 2	Secret Royal Inspector's Appearance	Hong Dae-kwang	The Future's Distance (먼 훗날)	YB	46
Pair 2	Rain in the Sky Raincoat Girl	Park Jin-joo	Whistle to Me (휠릴리)	Lee Soo-young	53
Round 3
Finalists	Lovers in Paris Eiffel Tower	Lee Jin-sung of Monday Kiz	Blue Whale (흰수염고래)	YB	60
Finalists	Rain in the Sky Raincoat Girl	Park Jin-joo	Ugly	2NE1	39
Final
Battle	Lovers in Paris Eiffel Tower	Lee Jin-sung of Monday Kiz	Previous three songs used as voting standard		29
Battle	Ready to Order, Popcorn Girl	Ali	The Story of the Rain and You (비와 당신의 이야기)	Boohwal	70

=== 42nd Generation Mask King ===
- Contestants : So Chan-whee, Oh Seung-eun, Kim You-jin (KNK), Baek A-yeon, Lee Won-hee, Kim Dong-myeong (Boohwal), Park Soo-hong, Dongjun (ZE:A)
Episodes 83 – 84

Episode 83

Episode 83 was broadcast on October 30, 2016. This marks the beginning of the Forty-second Generation.

Order	Stage Name	Real Name	Song	Original artist	Vote
Round 1
Pair 1	Bukppara Bukppabukppappa Girl Beating of the Drum	So Chan-whee	Aspirin (아스피린)	Girl (걸)	156
Pair 1	Voiceless Sound Melodious Voice Xylophone	Oh Seung-eun	Aspirin (아스피린)	Girl (걸)	43
2nd Song	Voiceless Sound Melodious Voice Xylophone	Oh Seung-eun	Wax Angel (밀랍천사)	Jaurim	–
Pair 2	How Did You Contact UFO	Youjin of KNK	I Believe	Shin Seung-hun	91
Pair 2	I Will Back Music Box	Baek A-yeon	I Believe	Shin Seung-hun	108
2nd Song	How Did You Contact UFO	Youjin of KNK	Like a Child (아이처럼)	Kim Dong-ryul & Alex Chu	–
Pair 3	My Dream of Buying a House Deposit Man	Lee Won-hee	Lady at the Cigarette Shop (담배 가게 아가씨)	Song Chang-sik	33
Pair 3	Long Life of the Golden Turtle	Kim Dong-myung of Boohwal	Lady at the Cigarette Shop (담배 가게 아가씨)	Song Chang-sik	166
2nd Song	My Dream of Buying a House Deposit Man	Lee Won-hee	Travel to Me (나에게로 떠나는 여행)	Buzz	–
Pair 4	I Like Train Station Employee	Park Soo-hong	Myself Reflected in My Heart (내 마음에 비친 내 모습)	Yoo Jae-ha	64
Pair 4	A Day's Trip Chuncheon Station	Dongjun of ZE:A	Myself Reflected in My Heart (내 마음에 비친 내 모습)	Yoo Jae-ha	135
2nd Song	I Like Train Station Employee	Park Soo-hong	A Wonderful Day in October (10월의 어느 멋진 날에)	Kim Dong-kyu	–

Episode 84

Episode 84 was broadcast on November 6, 2016. "Heart Attack Cupid", who was Mask King of the special live broadcast (aired October 5, 2016), participated in the final battle with the Forty-first Generation Mask King and the Challenger.

Order	Stage Name	Real Name	Song	Original artist	Vote
Round 2
Pair 1	Bukppara Bukppabukppappa Girl Beating of the Drum	So Chan-whee	Romantic Cat (낭만 고양이)	Cherry Filter	94
Pair 1	I Will Back Music Box	Baek A-yeon	Fate (인연)	Lee Sun-hee	105
Pair 2	Long Life of the Golden Turtle	Kim Dong-myung of Boohwal	Already Sad Love (이미 슬픈 사랑)	Yada	121
Pair 2	A Day's Trip Chuncheon Station	Dongjun of ZE:A	Forget You (잊을게)	YB	78
Round 3
Finalists	I Will Back Music Box	Baek A-yeon	Beautiful Days (아름다운 날들)	Jang Hye-jin	38
Finalists	Long Life of the Golden Turtle	Kim Dong-myung of Boohwal	Mona Lisa (모나리자)	Cho Yong-pil	161
Final
Battle	Heart Attack Cupid	Sandeul of B1A4	Winter Letter (겨울편지)	Yim Jae-beom	44
Battle	Long Life of the Golden Turtle	Kim Dong-myung of Boohwal	Previous three songs used as voting standard		57
Battle	Ready to Order, Popcorn Girl	Ali	Wild Flower (야생화)	Park Hyo-shin	98

=== 43rd Generation Mask King ===
- Contestants : Monika (Badkiz), Jota (Madtown), Kim Hyun-jung, Park Kyung-seo (Miss Mister), Im Ho, Nam Kyung-joo, Jinyoung (B1A4), Shin Yong-jae (4Men)
Episodes 85 – 86

Episode 85

Episode 85 was broadcast on November 13, 2016. This marks the beginning of the Forty-third Generation.

Order	Stage Name	Real Name	Song	Original artist	Vote
Round 1
Pair 1	The Wizard of OZ Dorothy	Monika of Badkiz	Now I Wish It Was So (이젠 그랬으면 좋겠네)	Cho Yong-pil	66
Pair 1	Sexy Brain Puppet	Jota of Madtown	Now I Wish It Was So (이젠 그랬으면 좋겠네)	Cho Yong-pil	33
2nd Song	Sexy Brain Puppet	Jota of Madtown	The Covered Up Road (가리워진 길)	Yoo Jae-ha	–
Pair 2	Love is on Big Wheel	Kim Hyun-jung	Shout Myself (나를 외치다)	Maya	51
Pair 2	Up Down Viking	Park Kyung-seo of Miss Mister	Shout Myself (나를 외치다)	Maya	48
2nd Song	Up Down Viking	Park Kyung-seo of Miss Mister	Making a New Ending for This Story (이 소설의 끝을 다시 써 보려 해)	Han Dong-geun	–
Pair 3	Good Luck Examinee	Im Ho	You That Meet Unexpectedly (어쩌다 마주친 그대)	Songgolmae	43
Pair 3	Am I Perfect Score Test Paper	Nam Kyung-joo	You That Meet Unexpectedly (어쩌다 마주친 그대)	Songgolmae	56
2nd Song	Good Luck Examinee	Im Ho	A Night Like Tonight (오늘 같은 밤이면)	Park Jeong-woon	–
Pair 4	Don't Make Me Cry Coward Lion	Jinyoung of B1A4	In Summer (여름 안에서)	Deux	37
Pair 4	Warm Heart Robot	Shin Yong-jae of 4Men	In Summer (여름 안에서)	Deux	62
2nd Song	Don't Make Me Cry Coward Lion	Jinyoung of B1A4	I'm Going Back (나 돌아가)	Lim Jeong-hee	–

Episode 86

Episode 86 was broadcast on November 20, 2016.

Order	Stage Name	Real Name	Song	Original artist	Vote
Round 2
Pair 1	The Wizard of OZ Dorothy	Monika of Badkiz	Memory Loss (기억상실)	Gummy	60
Pair 1	Love is on Big Wheel	Kim Hyun-jung	I Will Survive (난 괜찮아)	Pearl	39
Pair 2	Am I Perfect Score Test Paper	Nam Kyung-joo	Sorry (미안해요)	Kim Gun-mo	26
Pair 2	Warm Heart Robot	Shin Yong-jae of 4Men	Sometimes (가끔)	Crush	73
Round 3
Finalists	The Wizard of OZ Dorothy	Monika of Badkiz	U&I	Ailee	17
Finalists	Warm Heart Robot	Shin Yong-jae of 4Men	Station (정류장)	Panic	82
Final
Battle	Ready to Order, Popcorn Girl	Ali	Chitty Chitty Bang Bang	Lee Hyori (ft. Ceejay (Fresh Boyz))	40
Battle	Warm Heart Robot	Shin Yong-jae of 4Men	Previous three songs used as voting standard		59

=== 44th Generation Mask King ===
- Contestants : Cao Lu (Fiestar), Kim Wan-sun, Kim Na-young, Choi Min-yong, Lim Seul-ong (2AM), Shin Bong-sun, Kim Sa-rang, Park Wan-kyu
Episodes 87 – 88

Episode 87

Episode 87 was broadcast on November 27, 2016. This marks the beginning of the Forty-fourth Generation.

Order	Stage Name	Real Name	Song	Original artist	Vote
Round 1
Pair 1	Don't Compel to Me, Korean Trip	Cao Lu of Fiestar	Alone (나 혼자)	Sistar	39
Pair 1	Mask-Bride is Married	Kim Wan-sun	Alone (나 혼자)	Sistar	60
2nd Song	Don't Compel to Me, Korean Trip	Cao Lu of Fiestar	Between Love and Friendship (사랑과 우정 사이)	Pinocchio (피노키오)	–
Pair 2	Weightliftergirl Kim Mask	Kim Na-young	Said (...라구요)	Kang San-eh	66
Pair 2	Bae Cheol-soo's Mask Camp	Choi Min-yong	Said (...라구요)	Kang San-eh	33
2nd Song	Bae Cheol-soo's Mask Camp	Choi Min-yong	Forever (영영)	Na Hoon-a	–
Pair 3	Mask Magazine 2580	Lim Seul-ong of 2AM	Youth (청춘)	Sanulrim	58
Pair 3	Father, I Gonna Mask King	Shin Bong-sun	Youth (청춘)	Sanulrim	41
2nd Song	Father, I Gonna Mask King	Shin Bong-sun	Seoul Tango (서울 탱고)	Bang Sil-yi	–
Pair 4	Meet When I Become Mask King, Mask Star	Kim Sa-rang	You Give Love a Bad Name	Bon Jovi	35
Pair 4	Challenge! Infinite Fashion King	Park Wan-kyu	You Give Love a Bad Name	Bon Jovi	64
2nd Song	Meet When I Become Mask King, Mask Star	Kim Sa-rang	After This Night (이 밤이 지나면)	Yim Jae-beom	–

Episode 88

Episode 88 was broadcast on December 4, 2016.

Order	Stage Name	Real Name	Song	Original artist	Vote
Round 2
Pair 1	Mask-Bride is Married	Kim Wan-sun	Eyes, Nose, Lips (눈,코,입)	Taeyang	40
Pair 1	Weightliftergirl Kim Mask	Kim Na-young	Butterfly	Loveholics	59
Pair 2	Mask Magazine 2580	Lim Seul-ong of 2AM	I Don't Love You (널 사랑하지 않아)	Urban Zakapa	46
Pair 2	Challenge! Infinite Fashion King	Park Wan-kyu	Winter Sea (겨울바다)	Blue Sky (푸른하늘)	53
Round 3
Finalists	Weightliftergirl Kim Mask	Kim Na-young	How Love is It (어떻게 사랑이 그래요)	Lee Seung-hwan	55
Finalists	Challenge! Infinite Fashion King	Park Wan-kyu	Girls' Generation (소녀시대)	Lee Seung-chul	44
Final
Battle	Weightliftergirl Kim Mask	Kim Na-young	Previous three songs used as voting standard		21
Battle	Warm Heart Robot	Shin Yong-jae of 4Men	Things I Can't Do for You (해줄 수 없는 일)	Park Hyo-shin	78

=== 45th Generation Mask King ===
- Contestants : Seo Tae-hwa, Hong Kyung-in, Kim Feel, Joo Woo-jae, Ahn Ji-young (Bolbbalgan4), Tyler Rasch, Jo Yoo-jin (Cherry Filter), Park Ki-young
Episodes 89 – 90

Episode 89

Episode 89 was broadcast on December 11, 2016. This marks the beginning of the Forty-fifth Generation.

Order	Stage Name	Real Name	Song	Original artist	Vote
Round 1
Pair 1	First Snow in My Heart Snowball	Seo Tae-hwa	To You (그대에게)	Infinite Track	25
Pair 1	Everywhere Speaker	Hong Kyung-in	To You (그대에게)	Infinite Track	74
2nd Song	First Snow in My Heart Snowball	Seo Tae-hwa	Melancholy Letter (우울한 편지)	Yoo Jae-ha	–
Pair 2	Tunning! Violin Man	Kim Feel	A Passionate Goodbye (뜨거운 안녕)	Toy & E Z Hyung	68
Pair 2	Do Re Mi Fa Sol La Si Do Piano Man	Joo Woo-jae	A Passionate Goodbye (뜨거운 안녕)	Toy & E Z Hyung	31
2nd Song	Do Re Mi Fa Sol La Si Do Piano Man	Joo Woo-jae	I Love You (사랑합니다)	Tim	–
Pair 3	Running Time Rabbit	Ahn Ji-young of Bolbbalgan4	Love at Milky Way Coffee Shop (사랑은 은하수 다방에서)	10cm	70
Pair 3	Suspicious Le Chapelier	Tyler Rasch	Love at Milky Way Coffee Shop (사랑은 은하수 다방에서)	10cm	29
2nd Song	Suspicious Le Chapelier	Tyler Rasch	I'm Your Man	John Park	–
Pair 4	Alice in Wonderland	Jo Yoo-jin of Cherry Filter	Invitation to Me (나에게로의 초대)	Jung Kyung-hwa	46
Pair 4	Heart Heart Queen	Park Ki-young	Invitation to Me (나에게로의 초대)	Jung Kyung-hwa	53
2nd Song	Alice in Wonderland	Jo Yoo-jin of Cherry Filter	Stay	Nell	–

Episode 90

Episode 90 was broadcast on December 18, 2016.

Order	Stage Name	Real Name	Song	Original artist	Vote
Round 2
Pair 1	Everywhere Speaker	Hong Kyung-in	You're Only in a Place Slightly Higher Than Me (나보다 조금 더 높은 곳에 니가 있을 뿐)	Shin Seung-hun	19
Pair 1	Tunning! Violin Man	Kim Feel	Though You're Leave Me (그대 떠나가도)	Jo Jang-hyuk	80
Pair 2	Running Time Rabbit	Ahn Ji-young of Bolbbalgan4	Rainy Season (장마)	Choi Jung-in	34
Pair 2	Heart Heart Queen	Park Ki-young	Please (제발)	Lee So-ra	65
Special	Running Time Rabbit	Ahn Ji-young of Bolbbalgan4	Eat (꺼내 먹어요)	Zion.T	–
Round 3
Finalists	Tunning! Violin Man	Kim Feel	That's Only My World (그것만이 내 세상)	Deulgukhwa	38
Finalists	Heart Heart Queen	Park Ki-young	Lonely Night	Boohwal	61
Final
Battle	Heart Heart Queen	Park Ki-young	Previous three songs used as voting standard		47
Battle	Warm Heart Robot	Shin Yong-jae of 4Men	In My Dream (꿈에)	Jo Deok-bae	52

=== 46th Generation Mask King ===
- Contestants : Heo Kyung-hwan, Yoo Yeon-jung (I.O.I/WJSN), Jung Seung-hwan, Byun Woo-min, Kim Hyun-jung (Space A), Kim Se-heon (Eve), Kim Myung-hoon (Ulala Session), Ji So-yun
Episode 91

Episode 91 was broadcast on December 25, 2016. This marks the beginning of the Forty-sixth Generation.

Order	Stage Name	Real Name	Song	Original artist	Vote
Round 1
Pair 1	The Salvation Army	Heo Kyung-hwan	Love Grass (풀잎사랑)	Choi Sung-soo	30
Pair 1	Snow Cornice, Our Town	Yoo Yeon-jung of I.O.I/Cosmic Girls	Love Grass (풀잎사랑)	Choi Sung-soo	69
2nd Song	The Salvation Army	Heo Kyung-hwan	Last Promise (마지막 약속)	Kim Jung-min	–
Pair 2	Regional Defense Corps Desertman	Jung Seung-hwan	Old Love (옛사랑)	Lee Moon-sae	61
Pair 2	Joy to the Tree	Byun Woo-min	Old Love (옛사랑)	Lee Moon-sae	38
2nd Song	Joy to the Tree	Byun Woo-min	I Love You (사랑해요)	Simply Sunday	–
Pair 3	Kettle Madam	Kim Hyun-jung of Space A	I'll Become Dust (Kim Kwang-seok version) (먼지가 되어)	Lee Miki	57
Pair 3	Reap What We Sow Socksboy	Kim Se-heon of EVE	I'll Become Dust (Kim Kwang-seok version) (먼지가 되어)	Lee Miki	42
2nd Song	Reap What We Sow Socksboy	Kim Se-heon of EVE	Honey	Park Jin-young	–
Pair 4	Mysticism Baby Angel	Kim Myung-hoon of Ulala Session	All for You	Cool	70
Pair 4	Peal of Bells Ring	Ji So-yun	All for You	Cool	29
2nd Song	Peal of Bells Ring	Ji So-yun	Look Out the Window (창 밖을 보라)	Korean children song	–
