= Graceful 4 =

Studio album by The Grace
- Released: November 14, 2007
- Recorded: 2006–2007
- Genre: J-pop; dance-pop; reggae; ballad
- Length: 52:05
- Label: Rhythm Zone

The Grace chronology
One More Time, OK? (2007)	Graceful 4 (2007)	Dear... (2009)

Singles from Graceful 4
- 1. "Boomerang" Released: January 25, 2006; 2. "The Club (Japanese ver.)" Released: March 8, 2006; 3. "Sweet Flower" Released: April 26, 2006; 4. "Juicy Love" Released: July 12, 2006; 5. "Piranha" Released: August 1, 2007

Graceful 4 is the debut Japanese album and second overall by South Korean girl group The Grace, released by Rhythm Zone on November 14, 2007.

"One More Time, OK?" was served as the lead single of the album, which is a Japanese version of their Korean song with the same title. The album includes their five Japanese singles was previously released from 2006–2007 and the album has a total of 14 tracks. The album sold a total of 1,622 copies in Japan, peaking at No. 103 in the Oricon charts.

== Track listing ==
=== CD ===
1. "Piranha"
2. "One More Time, OK?"
3. "Just for One Day" (special edition) (天上智喜feat. JEJUNG from 東方神起)
4. "I'll Kiss You"
5. "Boomerang"
6. "Pardon Me??"
7. "5cm"
8. "Sweet Flower"
9. "Get on the Floor" (天上智喜&Dogma)
10. "The Club" (feat. Seamo)
11. "Juicy Love" (feat. Cornhead)
12. "My Everything"

=== DVD ===
1. "One More Time, OK?" (video clip)
2. "Piranha" (video clip)
3. "Juicy Love" (video clip)
4. "Sweet Flower" (video clip)
5. "The Club" (video clip)
6. "Boomerang" (video clip)
