= My Everything (The Grace song) =

- Digital cover

Single album by The Grace
- Released: November 3, 2006
- Genre: Pop
- Length: 19:15
- Language: Korean; English
- Label: SM
- Producer: Lee Soo-man

The Grace chronology
The Club (2006)	My Everything (2006)	Sweet Flower (2006)

Singles from My Everything
- 1. "My Everything" Released: November 3, 2006

My Everything is the third single album by South Korean girl group The Grace, released on November 3, 2006 by SM Entertainment. The single composed of five tracks, including the lead single of the same name "열정(My Everything)" and cover version of George Michael's single "Faith". It also marks their first release with the group's new name The Grace were added after their Korean and Chinese name.

The lead single music video was starring by Super Junior's Kibum and Girls' Generation's Yoona as the main role.

== Commercial performance ==
The single debuted at #30 on the Music Industry Association of Korea's November 2006 charts, with 2,447 copies sold.

== Track listing ==
My Everything track listing
No.	Title	Lyrics	Music	Arrangement	Length
1.	"My Everything" (열정)	Yoo Young-jin	Jen Thoresen; Maria Haukaas Storeng; Yoo Young-jin	Yoo Young-jin	5:07
2.	"The Final Sentence"	Yoon Sang	Park Chang-hak	Hwang Sung-je	3:33
3.	"Iris" (할 말이 있어요)	Shim Ji-won	Jamie Jones	Jamie Jones	4:43
4.	"Faith"	George Michael	George Michael	Kenzie	1:57
5.	"My Everything (Radio edit ver.)" (열정)	Yoo Young-jin	Jen Thoresen; Maria Haukaas Storeng; Yoo Young-jin	Yoo Young-jin	3:55
Total length:					19:15
