= Piranha (song) =

Single by The Grace

from the album Graceful 4
- Released: August 1, 2007
- Recorded: 2006–2007
- Genre: Dance-pop; Ballad
- Length: 4:04
- Label: Rhythm Zone
- Songwriter(s): Phillipe-marc Anquetil; Christopher Lee

The Grace singles chronology
"'One More Time, OK?'" (2007)	"Piranha" (2007)	"'Dancer In The Rain'" (2007)

Piranha is the fifth Japanese single by South Korean girl group The Grace. It was released on August 1, 2007 by Rhythm Zone in both CD and CD+DVD (Limited Edition) versions. The single was consists of the lead single "Piranha", the Japanese version of "My Everything", "One More Time, OK?" and remix version of "The Club". It ranked #50 on the Oricon charts and charted for two weeks, selling 2,920 copies in Japan.

== Track listing ==
=== CD Only ===
1. "Piranha"
2. "My Everything"
3. "Just for One Day" feat.Jejung from 東方神起
4. "The Club "STY Gin n' Tonic Remix"" feat.Seamo (Limited Edition)
5. "Piranha" (Instrumental)
6. "My Everything" (Instrumental)
7. "Just for One Day" (Instrumental with Jejung)
8. "Just for One Day" (Instrumental with 天上智喜)

=== CD+DVD ===
==== CD Portion ====
1. "Piranha"
2. "My Everything"
3. "Just for One Day" feat. Jejung from 東方神起
4. "The Club "STY Gin n' Tonic Remix"" feat. Seamo (Limited Edition)
5. "Piranha" (Instrumental)
6. "My Everything" (Instrumental)
7. "Just for One Day" (Instrumental with Jejung)
8. "Just for One Day" (Instrumental with 天上智喜)

==== DVD Portion ====
1. "Piranha" Music video
