= Here (The Grace song) =

Single by The Grace and Cliff Edge

from the album Dear...
- B-side: "Near: Thoughtful 1220"
- Released: October 22, 2008
- Recorded: 2008
- Genre: J-pop; R&B
- Label: Rhythm Zone
- Composers: JUN; Shogo Suo
- Lyricists: JUN; Shin; Shogo Suo

The Grace and Cliff Edge singles chronology
"'Stand Up People'" (2008)	"Here" (2008)

Here is the seventh Japanese single by South Korean girl group The Grace, collaboration with Japanese Hip-hop group Cliff Edge under the Rhythm Zone in two versions: CD and CD+DVD (Limited Edition).

The A-side single was used as the theme song of the movie adaptation of The Homeless Student (Homeless Chugakusei) and as the opening theme song for the TV show Sakigake! Ongaku Banduke ~JET~. The B-side single was also chosen to be the theme song of TV show Suki Bara.

After the early released of "Here" PV, it was announced that the B-track of "Here", "Near" will also have a promotional video as well. Tenjochiki had been reported to film in Guam for this promotional video.

== Promotions ==
On September 27, The Grace were the surprise guests at the first screening of "Homeless Chugakusei" performing "Here" live with Cliff Edge. The Japanese audience known for its meticulous taste in music and performances rose to its feet for a standing ovation in recognition of their super performance.

On October 18, four days before release, they made another unannounced surprise appearance at the 21st International Tokyo Film Festival. The girls were reported to accompany the author and actors of Homeless Chugakusei.

The single was released on October 22 and offered for free download for a limited time two months prior to release. The Grace and Cliff Edge held a special showcase on July 18 at Tokyo's Shinjuku Face.

== Commercial performance ==
"Here" was at the top of the pre-order charts and ranked in the Top 20 of J-Pop Usen chart in August and September.

"Here" had been promoted the heaviest among The Grace's Japanese single. All the promotions helped them achieve what they had never reached before, "Here" had debuted at #12 on the Oricon Daily Chart and kept fluctuating between #12 and #24 the entire week. The single charted at #18 on Japan's Oricon Weekly Chart. The single charted for five weeks and sold a total of 16,076 copies in Japan, making it most successful Japanese release yet in their career.

== Track listing ==
=== CD Only ===
1. "Here
2. "Near: Thoughtful 1220
3. "Here (instrumental)
4. "Near: Thoughtful 1220 (instrumental)

=== CD+DVD ===
==== CD Portion ====
1. "Here
2. "Near: Thoughtful 1220
3. "Here (instrumental)
4. "Near: Thoughtful 1220 (instrumental)

==== DVD Portion ====
1. "Here (Video clip)
2. "Near: Thoughtful 1220 (Video clip)
3. "Here (Video clip off shot)
