= Sunday (singer) =

South Korean singer (born 1987)

- 진보라
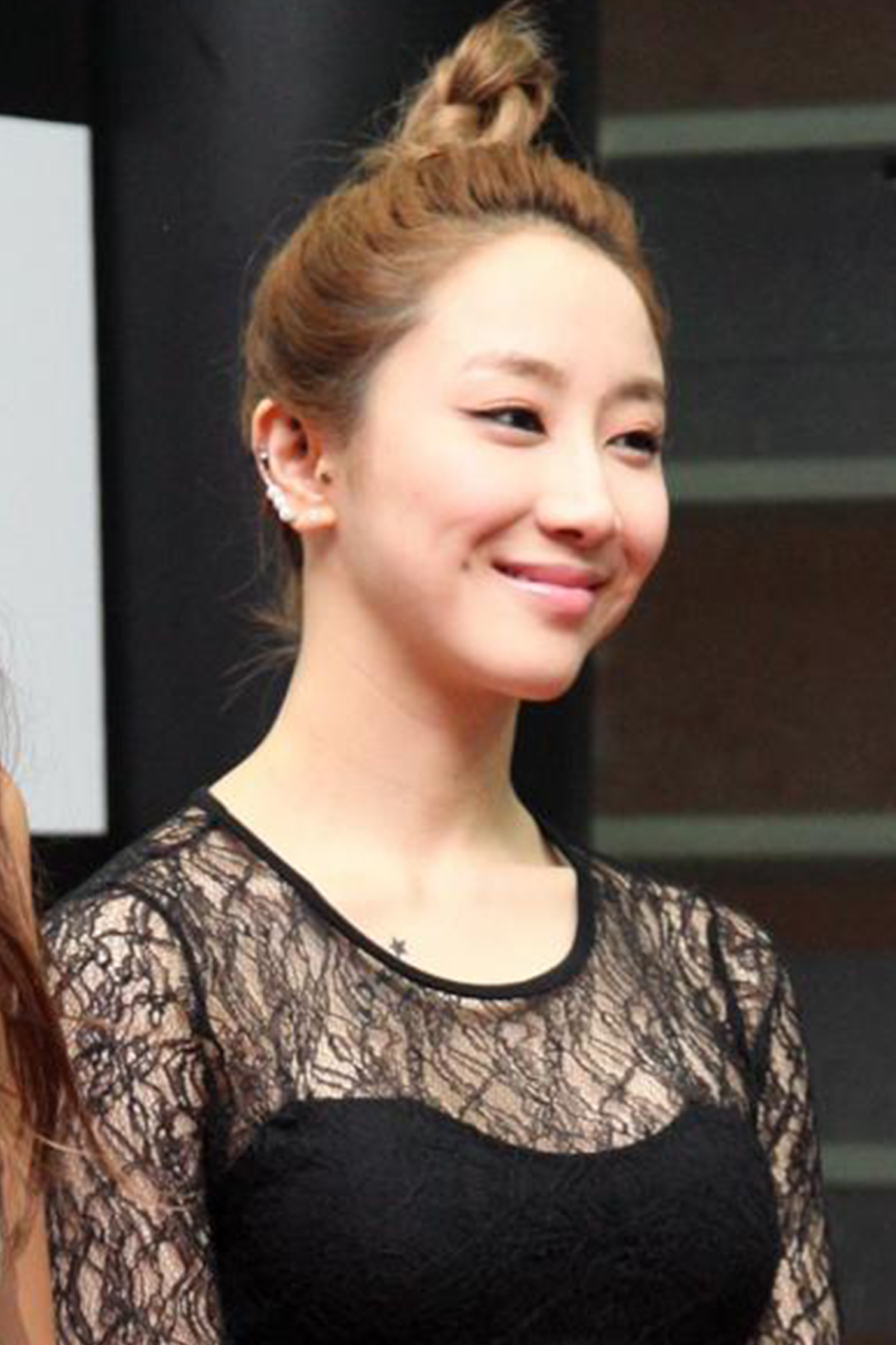
- Sunday at Cyworld Dream Music Festival in 2011
- Born: Jin Bo-ra; January 12, 1987 (age 39); Seoul, South Korea
- Occupations: Singer; actress
- Spouse: Unknown (m. 2020)
- Relatives: Jin Ye-sol (older sister)
- Musical career
- Genres: K-pop; R&B
- Instrument: Vocals
- Years active: 2004–present
- Label: SM
- Member of: The Grace; Dana&Sunday

Korean name
- Hangul: 진보라
- RR: Jin Bora
- MR: Chin Pora

Jin Bo-ra (Korean: 진보라; born January 12, 1987), known professionally as Sunday (선데이), is a South Korean singer and musical actress. She debuted in 2004 as a soloist in Japan with the release of two digital singles before eventually joined as a member of South Korean girl group The Grace in 2005. As of 2010, the group's activities was halted and she maintain her career as a musical actress.

== Career ==
Sunday began her career as a soloist in Japan with her debut digital single, "リラの片想い" (Rira no Kataomoi), on July 10, 2004. She released her second and last Japanese single, "ウソツキBOY" (Usotsuki Boy) on April 20, 2005.

Sunday became a member of the South Korean girl group The Grace in 2005. The group officially debuted on April 29, 2005, in China and May 1, 2005, in South Korea. As of 2010, The Grace has been on an indefinite hiatus.

In July 2011, Sunday and fellow The Grace member Dana formed the subgroup The Grace Dana & Sunday, releasing "One More Chance" (나 좀 봐줘) on July 11. Their debut performance was on July 8 on KBS Music Bank. The duo released soundtrack "Now You" (지금 그대) for the drama Hooray for Love (애정만만세) on September 23. The duo also participated in eighth winter compilation album from SM Town 2011 Winter SMTown – The Warmest Gift. The two performed the song "Amazing" physically released on December 13, following released song for "With Coffee Project Part 1" on December 20.

After a five-year hiatus from music, Sunday returned with the digital single "Still", a collaboration with DickPunks' Kim Tae-hyun, on November 11, 2016, as a part of SM Entertainment's project SM Station.

On January 20, 2021, it was reported that Sunday's exclusive contract with the agency had come to an end in May of the previous year. Soon after, SM Entertainment confirmed the news and stated, "Our exclusive contract with Sunday has come to an end. We will continue to cheer on her future activities."

== Discography ==
=== Soundtrack appearances and solo songs ===
Title	Year	Peak chart positions		Sales	Album
Title	Year	KOR Gaon	JPN Oricon	Sales	Album
"Rira no Kataomoi"	2004	—N/a	120	—N/a	Non-album singles
"Usotsuki Boy"	2005	—N/a	87	—N/a	Non-album singles
"Angels (Rock ver.) "	2007	—N/a	—	—N/a	Billie Jean, Look at Me OST
"I'm In Love"	2007	—N/a	—	—N/a	Oh Lovers OST
"Handel: Lascia Ch'io Pianga"	2011	—	—	—N/a	Operastar 2011 Part.1 (Live)
"Strauss II: Die Fruhlingsstimmen Op.410"	2011	—	—	—N/a	Operastar 2011 Part.2 (Live)
"Gershwin: Summertime"	2011	—	—	—N/a	Operastar 2011 Part.3 (Live)
"Still" (with Kim Tae-hyun of DickPunks)	2016	—	—	—N/a	SM Station Season 1
"—" denotes releases that did not chart or were not released in that region. "*" indicates that the Gaon Chart was revamped at this time and digital sales were deflated.

== Filmography ==
=== Television series ===
Year	Title	Role	Network	Note
2005–2008	Show Music Tank	herself	KMTV	MC
2011	Opera Star 2011	herself	tvN	regular cast
2012	Oh My God x2	Jin Bo-ra	SBS Plus	

=== Musical theatre ===
Year	Title	Role
2010	Rock of Ages	Sherrie
2011	The March of the Youth	Oh Young-shim
2012	Couple or Trouble	Anna / Na Sang-shil
2013	High School Musical	Sharpay
2014	Singin' in the Rain	Lina Lamont
2014	Zorro	Luisa
2015	Haru (하루)	Min Yeon Doo
2016	Finding Mr. Destiny	the woman
