= Juicy Love (The Grace song) =

Single by The Grace

from the album Graceful 4
- B-side: さよならの向こうに" (Sayonara no Mukou ni)
- Released: July 12, 2006
- Recorded: 2006
- Genre: J-pop; reggae
- Length: 4:57
- Label: Rhythm Zone

The Grace singles chronology
"'Sweet Flower'" (2006)	"Juicy Love" (2006)	"'One More Time, OK?'" (2007)

Juicy Love (stylized as juicy LOVE) is the fourth Japanese single by South Korean girl group The Grace, released on July 12, 2006 by Rhythm Zone in two versions: CD and CD+DVD. It ranked #162 on the Oricon charts and charted for 1 week, selling 487 copies.

== Composition ==
Juicy Love contains two tracks. The lead single, "Juicy Love", is described as exciting dance song with a reggae rhythm that goes well with summer and features Japanese reggae rapper CORN HEAD. The B-side track, "Sayonara no mukou ni", is described as ballad song that sung by Dana and written by herself.

== Track listing ==
=== CD only ===
1. "Juicy Love" feat. Corn Head
2. "さよならの向こうに (Sayonara no mukou ni)" feat. Dana
3. "Juicy Love" (Instrumental)
4. "さよならの向こうに (Sayonara no mukou ni)" (Instrumental)

=== CD + DVD ===
==== CD portion ====
1. "Juicy Love" feat. Corn Head
2. "さよならの向こうに (Sayonara no mukou ni)" feat. Dana
3. "Juicy Love" (Instrumental)
4. "さよならの向こうに (Sayonara no mukou ni)" (Instrumental)

==== DVD portion ====
1. "Juicy Love" video clip
2. Off shot & video clip making
