= One More Chance (The Grace song) =

"나 좀 봐줘 (One More Chance)"

Single by Dana & Sunday
- Released: July 11, 2011 (South Korea)
- Recorded: 2011
- Genre: K-pop; dance-pop; electropop
- Length: 3:50
- Label: SM Entertainment
- Songwriter: Kenzie
- Producers: Lee Soo-man (exec.); Kenzie

Dana & Sunday (The Grace) Korean/Japanese singles chronology
"A Little Bit of Good" (2009)	"나 좀 봐줘 (One More Chance)" (2011)	"Hooray for Love (애정만만세) OST Part.4: Now You (지금 그대)" (2011)

Music video
- "나 좀 봐줘 (One More Chance)" on YouTube

"One More Chance" is the debut digital single of The Grace subunit Dana & Sunday. It was released on various music portal charts including iTunes on July 11, 2011.

== Background ==
Various media outlets reported that The Grace would return in some time in April or July 2011, but due to the individual activities of Lina and Stephanie, only Dana and Sunday were scheduled for a comeback as a duo.

The song garnered interest due to its use of lyrics like "Take out the rib bone of Adam, when it's me that should have it taken out", and "Bridget Jones met her match, but what have I to lose against her?". These were considered "unique" topics, and were mentioned in various news outlets. CSJH's official website posted a statement saying "the lyrics plainly tells the story of single girls in our times, revealing new charms of The Grace through the fresh tune and the secrets of girls in the lyrics that anyone would empathize with".

Some of the lyrics were also deemed unsuitable for broadcast on MBC (specifically "I don't like soju because the shot glass is too small. It makes my face look big. Let's go with makgeolli (Korean rice wine) since the glass is big and it's my style"), but it passed SBS and KBS' regulations without any issues. The duo agreed to change the lyrics from soju to 'espresso' and makgeolli to 'latte' for their continued performances on MBC from then on.

== Live performance ==
They first performed on KBS Music Bank as their debut/comeback stage on July 8, 2011, followed by performances on MBC Show! Music Core, SBS Inkigayo and on M! Countdown respectively. Dana & Sunday concluded their promotions on August 27, 2011 at MBC Show! Music Core.

== Music video ==
The music video for their single "One More Chance" was released through SMTown Official YouTube page on July 8, 2011. It depicted scenes of Dana and Sunday walking through an airport, giving an interview while dressed in formal gowns, then dancing in front of a car.

== Composition ==
"나 좀 봐줘 (One More Chance)" is a dance-pop and electro-pop song combining grungy synths, catchy beats, and quirky bells and whistles.

"One More Chance" is the work of composer Kenzie, who also written, composed and arranged the song "One More Time, OK?" from their 2007 first album One More Time, OK?.

== Track listing ==
No.	Title	Lyrics	Music	Arrangement	Length
1.	"나 좀 봐줘 (One More Chance)"	Kenzie	Kenzie	Kenzie	03:50
Total length:					03:50

== Credits ==
Studio

- SM Yellow Tail Studio – recording, mixing
- Sonic Korea – mastering

Personnel

- SM Entertainment – executive producer
- Lee Soo-man – producer
- Dana & Sunday – vocals, background vocals
- Kenzie – producer, songwriter, vocal directing
- Koo Jong-pil – recording, mixing
- Jeon Hoon – mastering

== Singles chart ==
Song	Peak chart position	
Song	KOR	KOR
Song	Gaon Chart	K-Pop Billboard
"나 좀 봐줘 (One More Chance)"	26	20
