= Dear... (The Grace album) =

Studio album by The Grace
- Released: January 9, 2009
- Recorded: 2008
- Genres: J-pop; jazz; dance-pop
- Length: 38:33
- Label: Rhythm Zone

The Grace chronology
Graceful 4 (2007)	Dear... (2009)

Singles from Dear...
- 1. "Here" Released: October 22, 2008; 2. "Sukoshi de Ikara" Released: January 9, 2009

Dear... is the second Japanese studio album and third overall by South Korean girl group The Grace released on January 9, 2009. It also marks their last release as a group prior to their activities being hold since in 2010. The album peaked #14 on Oricon daily album charts and #37 on the Oricon weekly album charts, charted for 3 weeks and sold 4,734 copies, making it their most successful Japanese album at the time.

The album consists of nine tracks with the title track "Sukoshi de Ikara (少しでいいから) (A Little Bit of Good)" being used as a soundtrack song for the movie Subaru and including their seventh Japanese single previously released on October 22, 2008.

== Track listing ==
=== CD ===
1. "Here" (featuring Cliff Edge)
2. "Sukoshi de Ikara (少しでいいから)"
3. "Stand Up People"
4. "I Don't Know What To Do"
5. "Party"
6. "Tenjou no Melody (天上のメロディー; Celestial Melody)"
7. "Near: Thoughtful 1220"
8. "Doushite... (どうして・・・; Why)"
9. "Epilogue"

=== DVD ===
1. "Sukoshi de Ikara (少しでいいから)" (video clip)
2. "Near: Thoughtful 1220" (video clip)
3. "Here" (featuring Cliff Edge) (video clip)
4. "Stand Up People" (video clip)
- Bonus video clips
1. "One More Time, OK?" (video clip)
2. "Piranha" (video clip)
3. "Juicy Love" (video clip)
4. "Sweet Flower" (video clip)
5. "The Club" (video clip)
6. "Boomerang" (video clip)
