= Stephanie Kim =

South Korean singer (born 1987)

- 김보경
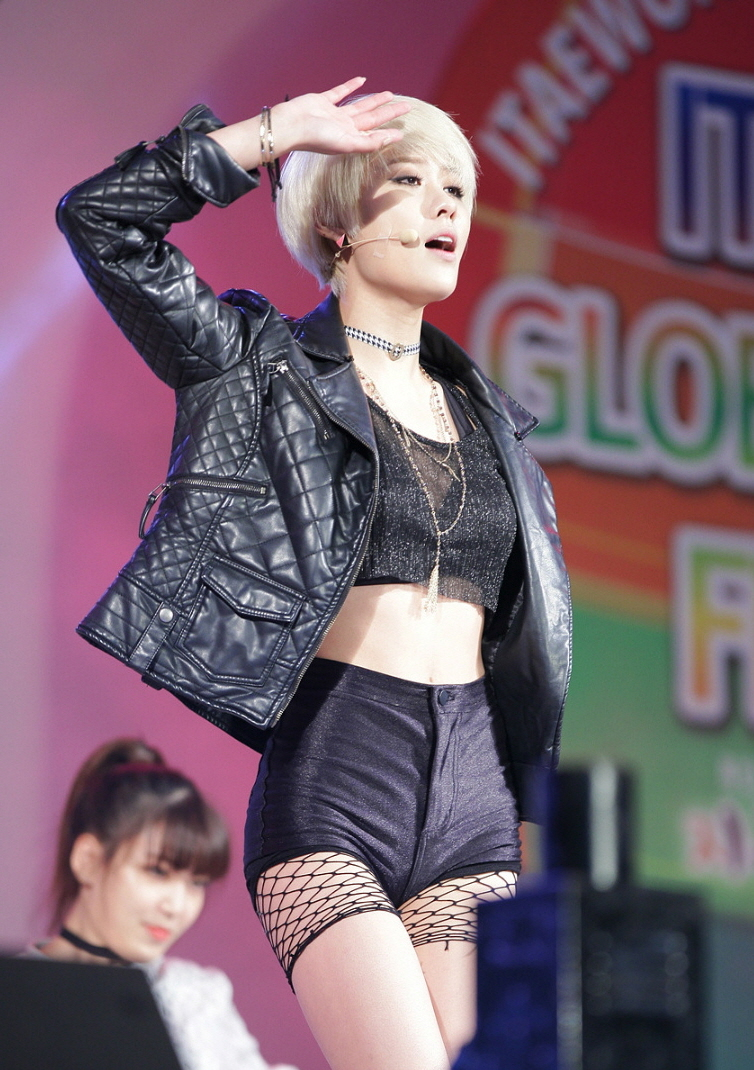
- Stephanie in 2017
- Born: Bo-kyung Kim; October 16, 1987 (age 39); San Diego, California, U.S.
- Other name: Stephanie Kim
- Occupations: Singer; ballerina; musical actress
- Musical career
- Genres: K-pop; R&B; dance; a cappella
- Instrument: Vocals
- Years active: 2005–present
- Labels: SM; Media Line; Mafia; WK Media; Artsro
- Formerly of: The Grace; SM Town

Korean name
- Hangul: 김보경
- Hanja: 金寶京
- RR: Gim Bogyeong
- MR: Kim Pogyŏng

Bo-kyung Kim (born October 16, 1987), better known as Stephanie Kim or Stephanie, is an American singer, ballerina and musical actress based in South Korea. Born and raised in California, she went to South Korea and joined SM Entertainment after winning Youth Best Selection Competition in February 2004. After years of training, she debuted as a member of South Korean girl group The Grace in April 2005. In October 2012, she began her solo career with the release of single album The New Beginning.

== Career ==
=== 2005–2010: The Grace (band) ===
Stephanie made her debut as a member of the girl group The Grace in 2005. Since then, they released three studio albums and ten singles. In 2010, the group made a hiatus due to her health issues.

=== 2011–present: Solo career ===
As of 2011, Stephanie became a member of the Los Angeles Ballet.

On October 8, 2012, Stephanie debuted as a solo artist under another music label called Media Line and released her first solo single album The New Beginning along with the title track "Game". In April 2014, it was reported that she would release an independent track in the summer under new label Mafia Records, but it was delayed due to an unknown reason. Her digital single "Prisoner" finally released in August 2015. Her follow-up digital single "Blackout" was released in late September 2015. Stephanie released her first EP "Top Secret" with title track "Up, Up" featuring Teen Top's L.joe in October 2015.

Stephanie released her third digital single "Tomorrow" on May 6, 2016. In the end of May 2016, Stephanie's contract with SM Entertainment expired. She maintained solo act under the record label Mafia Records.

In April 2019, Stephanie joined WK Media after her contract with Mafia Records ended. Soon afterwards, Stephanie released the digital single "Man on the Dance Floor" on April 18.

== Discography ==
=== Extended plays ===
Title	Album details	Peak chart positions	Sales
Title	Album details	KOR	Sales
Top Secret	Released: October 13, 2015; Label: Mafia Records, Interpark; Formats: CD, digital download	20	KOR: 12,496

=== Singles ===
Title	Year	Peak chart positions	Sales	Album
Title	Year	KOR	Sales	Album
"Game"	2012	94	KOR: 44,661+	The New Beginning
"Prisoner"	2015	180	—N/a	Top Secret
"Blackout"	2015	—	—N/a	Top Secret
"Tomorrow"	2016	—	—N/a	Non-album singles
"Man on the Dance Floor"	2019	—	—N/a	Non-album singles
"Say It" (feat. Lina)	2019	—	—N/a	Non-album singles
"Love Pain"	2020	—	—N/a	Non-album singles
"—" denotes releases that did not chart or were not released in that region.

=== Collaborations ===
Title	Year	Peak chart positions	Sales	Album	Artist(s)
Title	Year	KOR	Sales	Album	Artist(s)
"Together As One"	2016	—	—N/a	Hooxi, The Beginning	Various artists
"Appeal to Nationals" (통고국내문)	2020	—	—N/a	Non-album single	Jisehee, Somerz feat. Park Young Su)
"—" denotes releases that did not chart or were not released in that region.

=== Original Soundtracks ===
Title	Year	Peak chart positions	Sales	Album
Title	Year	KOR	Sales	Album
"Choice"(선택)	2015	—	—N/a	Immortal Songs: Singing the Legend (Baek Ji-young)
"You Leave" (떠나는 임아)	2016	—	—N/a	Immortal Songs: Singing the Legend (Oh Seung-geun & Jo Hang-jo)
"Becoming Dust" (먼지가 되어)	2016	—	—N/a	Immortal Songs: Singing the Legend (Kim Kwang-seok)
"Lost Umbrella" (잃어버린 우산)	2016	—	—N/a	Immortal Songs: Singing the Legend (Lunar New Year Special)
"The Face I Miss" (보고 싶은 얼굴)	2016	—	—N/a	Immortal Songs: Singing the Legend (Min Hae-kyung)
"Elegy of Twilight" (황혼의 엘레지)	2016	—	—N/a	Immortal Songs: Singing the Legend (Songwriter Park Chun-seok)
"The Day After You Left" (헤어진 다음 날) (with Sung Jin-woo)	2016	—	—N/a	King of Mask Singer: Episode 65
"100th Day" (100일 째 만남)	2016	—	—N/a	Immortal Songs: Singing the Legend (Roo'ra)
"THE BODY SHOW Gym" (체조) (with Lee Yang Ban)	2016	—	—N/a	OnStyle THE BODY SHOW 4 Gym
"Come Back" (와)	2016	—	—N/a	Immortal Songs: Singing the Legend (Composer Choi Jun-young)
"Anding"	2017	—	—N/a	Woman of Dignity OST Part.9
"—" denotes releases that did not chart or were not released in that region.

== Filmography ==
=== Dramas ===
Year	Title	Role
2017	Introverted Boss	Director Park

=== Variety show ===
Year	Title	Role	Notes/Ref.
2016	Immortal Song 2	Competitor	Episode 234 (January 16); Episode 235 (January 30); Episode 236 (February 6); Episode 237 (February 28); Episode 280 (December 3)
2016	Duet Song Festival	Competitor	Episode 4
2016	King of Mask Singer	Competitor	Episodes 65–66 (as "Video Tour of Departure")
2016	King of Mask Singer	Panelist	Episodes 73–74
2017	Singing Battle – Victory	Competitor	Episodes 24–25, 28–29
2017	Idol School	Dance Teacher	Regular mentor

=== Musical theatre ===
Year	Title	Role
2013	Oh! While You Were Sleeping	Jeong Sook-ja

=== Radio show ===
Year	Title	Notes
2014–2015	Arirang Radio Super K-POP	DJ
2014–2016	Arirang Radio Sound K	DJ
