= The Grace (group) =

South Korean a cappella girl group

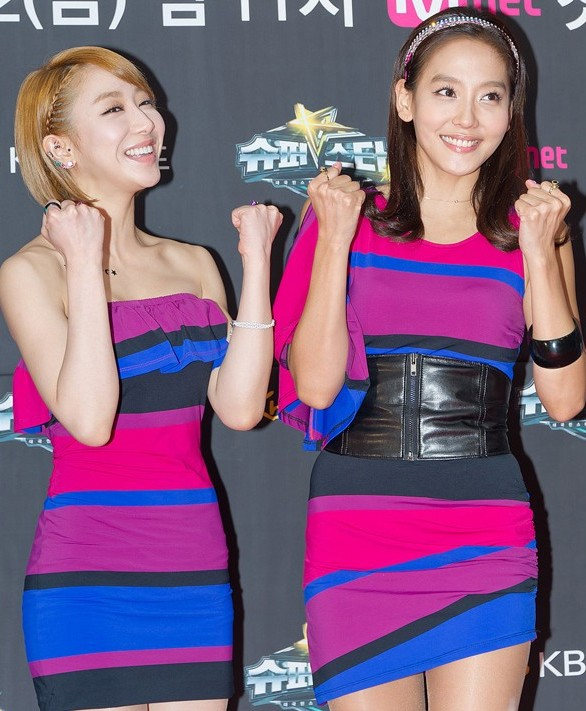
- The Grace sub-unit Dana & Sunday in 2011

Background information
- Also known as: Tenjochiki; CSJH; CSJH The Grace
- Origin: Seoul, South Korea
- Genres: K-pop; R&B; A cappella
- Years active: 2005–2010
- Labels: SM; Avex Asia; Rhythm Zone
- Spinoffs: The Grace - Dana & Sunday
- Spinoff of: SM Town
- Past members: Lina; Dana; Sunday; Stephanie
- Website: Japan Official Page

- The Grace
- Hangul: 천상지희 더 그레이스
- Hanja: 天上智喜 The Grace
- Revised Romanization: Cheonsang Jihui Deo Geuleiseu
- McCune–Reischauer: Ch'ŏnsang Chihŭi Dŏ G'ŭleisŭ

The Grace (stylized as 天上智喜 The Grace; Korean: 천상지희 더 그레이스; RR: Cheonsangjihui deo geuleiseu), known as Tenjochiki in Japan, was a South Korean a cappella girl group consisting of Lina, Dana, Sunday and Stephanie.

Formed by SM Entertainment in 2005, they were introduced as the female counterpart of TVXQ. In their early career, they initially had the words Cheonmu, Sangmi, Jiseong and Heeyeol in front of each member's name (in order: Stephanie, Lina, Sunday and Dana), but these were removed when the team name was changed to CSJH The Grace in 2006. Throughout the group's career, they released and performed music in Korean and Japanese with a total of three studio albums and many more singles.

In December 2008, Stephanie announced to be absence from group activities due her treatment of back pain and the group remained as three-piece. The group continued to release music until their second Japanese album Dear..., in January 2009. The group performed as a three-piece (without Stephanie) lastly in May 2010 at SM Town Live '10 World Tour in Seoul concert prior the group halted group promotions. In July 2011, the group returned with the unit Dana & Sunday and continued to release some digital singles before also going into hiatus. Currently all of The Grace's members maintain solo careers in fields including music, theater, and television, while member Stephanie signed with another music label for her solo music and maintaining her contract with SM Entertainment until it expired in 2016. Dana left SM Entertainment after contract expired on June 23, 2020. On January 19, 2021, Sunday left SM Entertainment.

== History ==
=== 2005: Debut with "Too Good" and "Boomerang" ===
The Grace made their first live performance in China on April 29, 2005. They performed their debut songs "Too Good" and "Boomerang", and the performance was broadcast weeks later by the Chinese channel CCTV. The verses in "Boomerang" were also sung in Chinese. The quartet made their first live performance in South Korea with "Too Good" on SBS's music program Inkigayo on May 1, 2005. They promoted the song for a few months before switching to "Boomerang".

After 7 months of promoting their first singles in Korea, the group headed off to promote in China. The Chinese version of the single was officially released in March 2006. The single included three new tracks: the Chinese versions of "Too Good" and "Boomerang" and the pre-group track "Fight To The End". After promotional activities concluded, The Grace headed to Japan.

=== 2006: Japanese debut and "My Everything" ===
They debut Japanese single "Boomerang" was released January 25, 2006. Later, the song was re-recorded and released with Japanese lyrics and an altered instrumental track, and a B-side called "Do You Know?", a solo song by member Sunday. "Boomerang" ranked #110 in the Japanese Singles Top 200 chart.

On March 8, they released second Japanese single "The Club", along with a solo song by Stephanie called "What U Want" was released. It reached #131 on the Japanese Oricon Charts. The single was also promoted briefly in South Korea. After quick promotional activities in Korea, the group went back to Japan for their third Japanese single, "Sweet Flower" which was used as the theme for the month of April on the TBS Radio & Communications music show Count Down TV. "Sweet Flower" entered the charts at #151. The single was also released in Korea by SM, but it was left unchanged from its Japanese version.

The Chinese version of their Japanese single "Boomerang" was released on June 19 by Avex Trax's official Chinese distributor CRSC in China. In Taiwan and Hong Kong, also included the Korean version of The Club was released and contained a Chinese version of "The Club" plus a DVD with the Korean music video.

Even with the first few singles having low sales, they continue with release Japanese single titled "Juicy Love". The single featuring Japanese reggae singer, Corn Head and included B-side track "Sayonara no Mukō ni", which written and sung by Dana.

The group resumed their activities in Korea with additions english phrase to their group name, The Grace, following the release of their third single "My Everything" on November 3, 2006. The B-side track included an A cappella version of George Michael's "Faith", "The Final Sentence" and "Iris (할 말이 있어요)". However, the change did not result in an increase in sales; the single entered at #30 on the Music Industry Association of Korea's month-end sales chart.

=== 2007: One More Time, OK? and Graceful4 ===
The group's first album, One More Time, OK? was released on May 4, 2007. The title song "One More Time, OK?" was The Grace's most successful song to date, topping Mnet M Countdown and SBS Inkigayo charts. The album reached sixth place for the month. On June 15, the album was released in Taiwan, The Grace's first major release overseas. "One More Time, OK?" won the Best Dance Music award at the 2007 Mnet Asian Music Awards (M.Net KM Music Festival).

A fifth Japanese single by the group, "Piranha" was released in August, consisting of "Piranha" and Japanese versions of "My Everything" and "Just For One Day", featuring TVXQ's Jaejoong. The single debuted at #26 on the Oricon daily charts and peaked at #50 on weekly charts.

In November, their first Japanese album Graceful 4 was released, consisting of nine previously released songs and new material, including the Japanese version of "One More Time, OK?" from their first Korean album's title track.

=== 2008: "Stand Up People" and "Here" ===
During the first months of 2008, The Grace performed at various events in support of their first Japanese album. They held three concerts in April and May named Graceful Party Vol. 1. The last one, at Daikanyama UNIT in Tokyo, featured their upcoming release "Here", a collaboration with hip-hop group, Cliff Edge.

Their sixth Japanese single called "Stand Up People", was released on July 23. It consisted of "Dear Friend", remixes of "Stand Up People" and "One More Time, OK?". Their seventh single, "Here" was released on October 22, but after the song leaked, a limited-time free download was offered. "Here" was the theme song of both the drama and movie of Homeless School Student, based on a Japanese best-seller book. A second song and music video were released, titled "Near". "Here" reached #16 on the Oricon Charts with sales of over 16,000.

In December 2008, it was announced through the group's Japanese website that Stephanie would absent from the group activities due to her back pain and remained of the member would continue the group activities.

=== 2009–2023: Dear..., sub-unit, indefinite hiatus and members departure from SM ===
The group's second Japanese album Dear... was released on January 7, 2009. The album peaked #14 on Oricon daily album charts and #37 on the Oricon weekly album charts, charted for 3 weeks and sold 4,734 copies, making it their most successful Japanese album.

The Grace appeared on the soundtrack of the Japanese movie Subaru with the songs "Sukoshi De Ii Kara / A Bit of Good" (少しでいいから) and "Coming To You". "Sukoshi De Ii Kara / A Bit of Good" was part of The Grace's second Japanese Album 'Dear...'. Stephanie also appeared in the movie as a ballet trainer.

On May 21, 2010, The Grace was seen performance lastly as a trio through the SM Town Live' 10 World Tour in Seoul prior the group had no activities as a whole group.

In July 2011, Dana and Sunday resumed their activities with formed the sub-unit The Grace - Dana & Sunday and then only active in that year.

On May 15, 2016, SM Entertainment announced Stephanie would be departing from the group after a prolonged hiatus, due to the expiration of her contract. She subsequently chose to sign as a soloist with Mafia Records. On June 23, 2020, Dana departure from SM following her contract expired after 19 years. On January 19, 2021, Sunday left SM Entertainment upon the expiration of her contract after 16 years. In 2023, Lina became the last member left SM Entertainment after her contract expired and without announcement.

== Sub-units ==
=== Dana & Sunday ===
On July 4, 2011, SM announced the return of The Grace after a four year hiatus with the unit were composed of Dana and Sunday. Their debut single, "One More Chance (나 좀 봐줘)" music video was released on July 8, following their debut stage on KBS Music Bank in the same day. Their debut single officially released on July 11.

On September 23, Dana & Sunday featured on part four of the soundtrack for the drama Hooray for Love (애정만만세) with the track "Now You" (지금 그대). Dana and Sunday's "With Coffee Project Part 1" was released on December 20 together with the music video of the song.

The duo also participated in the eighth SM Town winter compilation album, 2011 Winter SMTown – The Warmest Gift. The two performed the song "Amazing", which was released as a physical album only on December 13, 2011.

Though performing as solo artists, Dana and Sunday performed at SM Town Live 2019 concert in Tokyo on August 3–5, 2019.

== Discography ==
The Grace discography
- Studio albums: 3
- Singles: 15

=== Studio albums ===
Title	Album details	Peak chart positions		Sales
Title	Album details	KOR	JPN	Sales
One More Time, OK?	Released: May 4, 2007 (KOR); Label: S.M. Entertainment; Format: CD, musicassette, digital download	—	—	KOR: 17,712
Graceful 4	Released: November 14, 2007 (JPN); Label: Rhythm Zone; Format: CD, digital download	—	103	JPN: 2,000+
Dear...	Released: January 7, 2009 (JPN); Label: Rhythm Zone; Format: CD, digital download	—	37	JPN: 5,000+
"—" denotes releases that did not chart or were not released in that region.

=== Singles ===
Title	Year	Peak chart positions			Sales	Album
Title	Year	KOR	KOR Hot	JPN	Sales	Album
Korean
"Too Good" and "Boomerang"	2005	*	*	—	KOR: 4,911 (Phy.)	One More Time, OK?
"The Club" (featuring Rain)	2006	*	*	—	KOR: 3,004 (Phy.)	One More Time, OK?
"My Everything" (열정)	2006	*	*	—	KOR: 2,447 (Phy.)	One More Time, OK?
"One More Time, OK?" (한번 더, OK?)	2007	*	*	—	—N/a	One More Time, OK?
"Dancer In The Rain"	2007	*	*	—	—N/a	One More Time, OK?
"One More Chance" (as Dana&Sunday)	2011	26	20	—	KOR: 880,613	Non album-single
Japanese
"Boomerang"	2006	*	*	110	—N/a	Graceful 4
"The Club" (featuring SEAMO)	2006	*	*	131	—N/a	Graceful 4
"Sweet Flower"	2006	*	*	151	—N/a	Graceful 4
"Juicy Love" (featuring CORN HEAD)	2006	*	*	162	—N/a	Graceful 4
"Piranha"	2007	*	*	50	—N/a	Graceful 4
"One More Time, OK?"	2007	*	*	—	—N/a	Graceful 4
"Stand Up People"	2008	*	*	49	—N/a	Dear...
"Here" (with CLIFF EDGE)	2008	*	*	18	—N/a	Dear...
Chinese
"Too Good"	2006	—	—	—	—N/a	Non-album single
"—" denotes releases that did not chart or were not released in that region. "*" denotes chart did not exist at that time.

=== Soundtrack appearances ===
Song	Year	Film and/or television drama series
Korean
"Just for One Day (하루만)" (featuring Super Junior's Kyuhyun)	2007	Air City OST
"Now, You (지금 그대)" (as Dana & Sunday)	2011	Hooray for Love OST
"First Americano" (as Dana & Sunday)	2011	With Coffee Project
Japanese
"Get on the Floor" (With Dogma)	2006	Backdancers! Original Soundtrack
"Coming to You"	2009	Tribute to Subaru Street Dance Hen
"少しでいいから"	2009	Tribute to Subaru Street Dance Hen

=== Featured appearances ===
Title	Year	Album
Korean
"바램 (Fight to the End)"	2004	2004 Summer Vacation in SMTown.com
"Catch the Shooting Star"	2006	2006 Summer SMTown
"Dreams Come True"	2006	2006 Winter SMTown - Snow Dream
"Festival"	2007	2007 Summer SMTown - Fragile
"We Wish You a Merry Christmas & Feliz Navidad"	2007	2007 Winter SMTown - Only Love
"Amazing" (as Dana & Sunday)	2011	2011 Winter SMTown – The Warmest Gift

=== DVDs ===
- Rhythm Nation 2006: The biggest indoor music festival (Released: July 11, 2007) (Japan)
  - Track 7: Boomerang
- A-Nation'07: Best Hit Live (Released: November 7, 2007) (Japan)
  - Track 4: Piranha
- Rhythm Nation 2007: The biggest indoor music festival (Released: April 2, 2008) (Japan)
  - Track 15: One More Time, OK?
- A-Nation'08: Avex All Cast Special Live (Released: November 26, 2008) (Japan)
  - Track 29: Stand Up People

=== Music videos ===
Title	Year
Korean
"Too Good"	2005
"Boomerang"	2005
"The Club"	2006
"My Everything"	2006
"One More Time, OK?"	2007
"Dancer in the Rain"	2007
"One More Chance" (as Dana&Sunday)	2011
"First Americano" (as Dana&Sunday)	2011
Japanese
"Boomerang"	2006
"The Club"	2006
"Sweet Flower"	2006
"Juicy Love"	2006
"Piranha"	2007
"One More Time, Ok?"	2007
"Stand Up People"	2008
"Here"	2008
"Near ~thoughtful・1220~"	2008
"Coming to You"	2009
Chinese
"Too Good"	2006

== Concerts ==
=== Headlining ===
- Graceful Party Vol. 1 (2008)
- Tenjochiki 1st Live Tour 2009 ~Dear...~

=== Concert participation ===
- 2007 SM Town Summer Concert (2007)
- SM Town Live '08 (2008)
- SM Town Live '10 World Tour (2010)
- SM Town Live World Tour III (2012)
- SM Town Live 2019 in Tokyo (2019) (as separate performers)

== Awards ==
Years	Awards
2005	12th Annual Korea Entertainment Arts Awards : Best Female Group; 3rd South-East Music Ceremony : Best Foreign Singer Group
2006	13th Annual Korea Entertainment Arts Awards : Hallyu All Star Award
2007	14th Annual Korea Entertainment Arts Awards : Best Female Group; M.net Asian Music Awards : Best Dance Music
