= One More Time, OK? =

Studio album by The Grace
- Released: May 4, 2007
- Recorded: 2006–2007
- Studios: S.M. Studios (Seoul, South Korea)
- Genres: K-pop; dance-pop; R&B; a-cappella
- Length: 52:23
- Label: SM
- Producer: Lee Soo-man

The Grace chronology
One More Time, OK? (2007)	Graceful 4 (2007)

Singles from One More Time, OK?
- 1. "The Club" Released: March 8, 2006; 2. "열정 (My Everything)" Released: November 3, 2006; 3. "One More Time, OK?" Released: May 4, 2007; 4. "Dancer In the Rain" Released: August 2007

One More Time, OK? (Korean: 한번 더, OK?; RR: Hanbeon Deo, Ok?) is the debut studio album by South Korean girl group The Grace, released by SM Entertainment on May 4, 2007. The album features guest appearances from Rain and labelmate Cho Kyu-hyun.

Preceding One More Time, OK? were two singles released a year prior: "The Club" (featuring Rain) and "My Everything". The namesake third single was, on the same day, released with the album and a music video. "Dancer in the Rain" was the fourth and final song issued as a single, having done so sometime around August.

The title track "One More Time, OK?" reached atop both the M! Countdown and Inkigayo charts. The album debuted at number six on the Music Industry Association of Korea monthly sales chart, with 11,828 physical copies sold.

Critical reception to the album has been generally positive. In 2015, music streaming service Bugs! and Wave named it as one of their top 19 idol girl group albums between 1995 and 2014. In 2020, the single of the same name ranked at 139 on the 250 greatest idol group songs of all time by Hellokpop.

== Track listing ==
1. "한번 더, OK?" (One More Time, OK?)
2. "女友 (그녀들의 수다) Girlfriends (Their Talking)"
3. "女友 (Girlfriends) Interlude"
4. "Sweet Emotion"
5. "그 사람... 욕하지 마요 (My Heartbreak)"
6. "Renew (사랑할 땐, 좋아할 땐)"
7. "4월의 첫 날 (April Fools' Day)"
8. "Dancer In The Rain"
9. "아니기를 (Not To Be)"
10. "하루만 (Just For One Day)" (feat. Kyuhyun of Super Junior)
11. "Tonight Is On Me"
12. "Dancing Queen"
13. "열정 (My Everything)"
14. "Boomerang"
15. "The Club" (feat. Rain) (bonus track)
