= Kang Hye-yeon =

South Korean singer (born 1990)

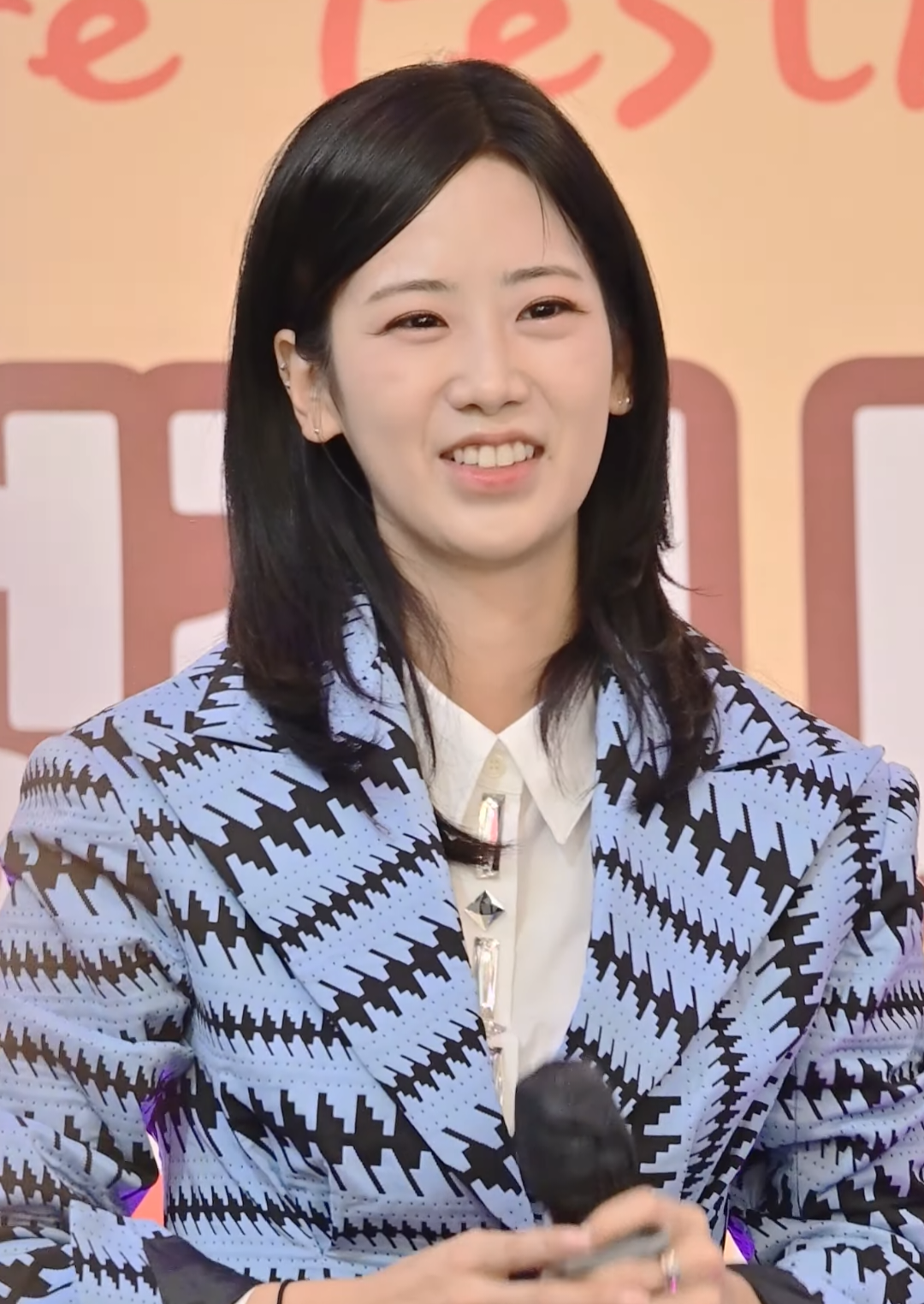
- Kang in November 2023
- Born: December 8, 1990 (age 35); Jeju City, South Korea
- Occupation: Singer
- Musical career
- Genres: K-pop; Trot; Ballad; Dance; R&B
- Instrument: Vocals
- Years active: 2012–present
- Labels: AB; YNB; Star
- Member of: Bestie
- Formerly of: EXID
- Website: https://kang-hyeyeon.com/

Korean name
- Hangul: 강혜연
- Hanja: 姜蕙姸
- RR: Gang Hyeyeon
- MR: Kang Hyeyŏn

Kang Hye-yeon (Korean: 강혜연; born December 8, 1990) is a South Korean trot singer. She is a member of the girl group Bestie and a former member of the girl group EXID. She has been active as a trot singer since the disbandment of the Bestie in 2018. Bestie reformed in October 2026.

== Early life ==
Kang was born in Jeju City, her mother's hometown, but grew up in Incheon. She has been playing piano since she was four, and started dreaming of becoming a singer after seeing Maya perform at the Inha University festival when she was in sixth grade.

== Career ==
=== Bestie and solo activities ===
While preparing for college, she saw an audition notice on the internet, recorded an MP3 and sent a demo file. She passed and, after being an idol trainee, she joined the girl group EXID and debuted under the stage name Dami on February 16, 2012. However, she left the group two months after the release of their debut album to focus on her studies.

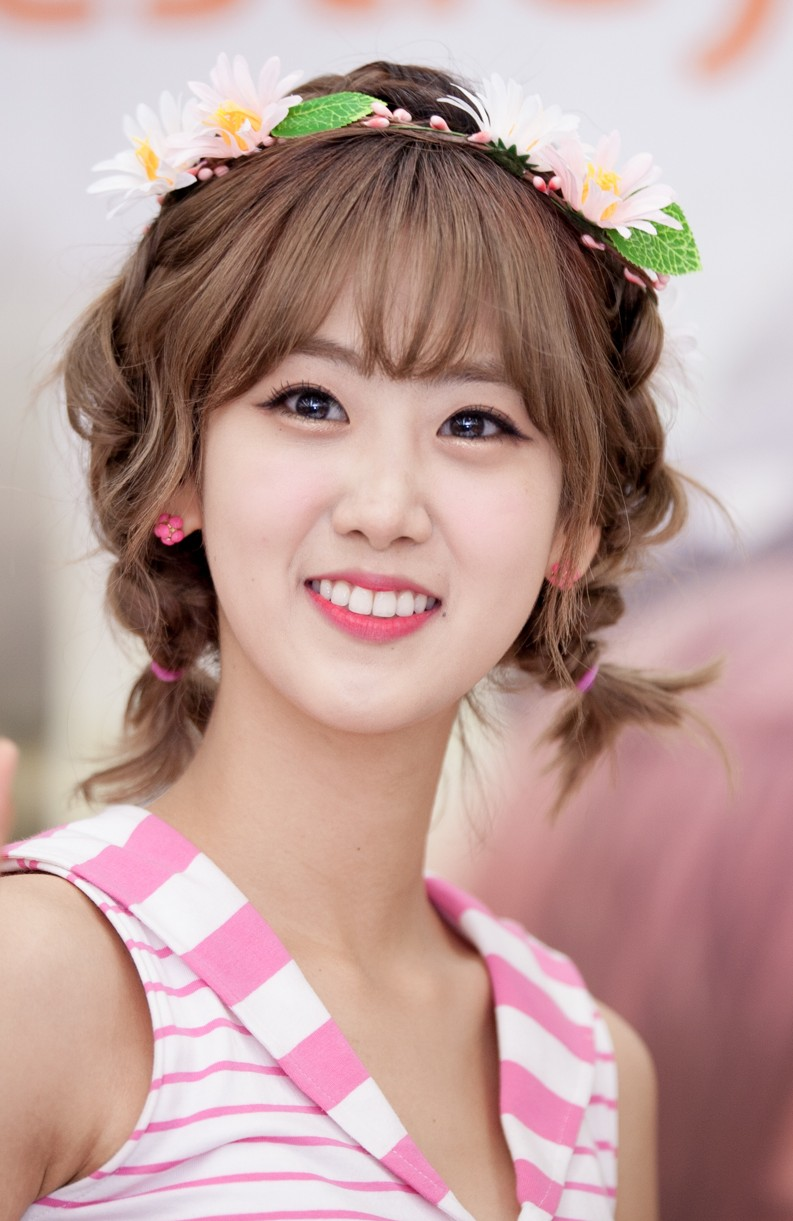
Kang in 2014

After that, she signed with YNB Entertainment along with Haeryung and Yooji, who were active in EXID together, and debuted as the lead vocalist and leader of the four-member girl group Bestie in July 2013. Although Bestie achieved their own level of recognition, Kang was never paid and worked several part-time jobs.

She signed an exclusive contract on October 25, 2018 with Star Entertainment and Bestie eventually disbanded. A few days later, on October 31, she released the single "Waddaya" (왔다야), turning into a trot singer. Kang had always liked trot and competed on Mnet's trot survival program Trot X in 2014 while she was promoting with Bestie, so, when Star Entertainment CEO Choi Yang-su suggested that she try that genre, she readily accepted.

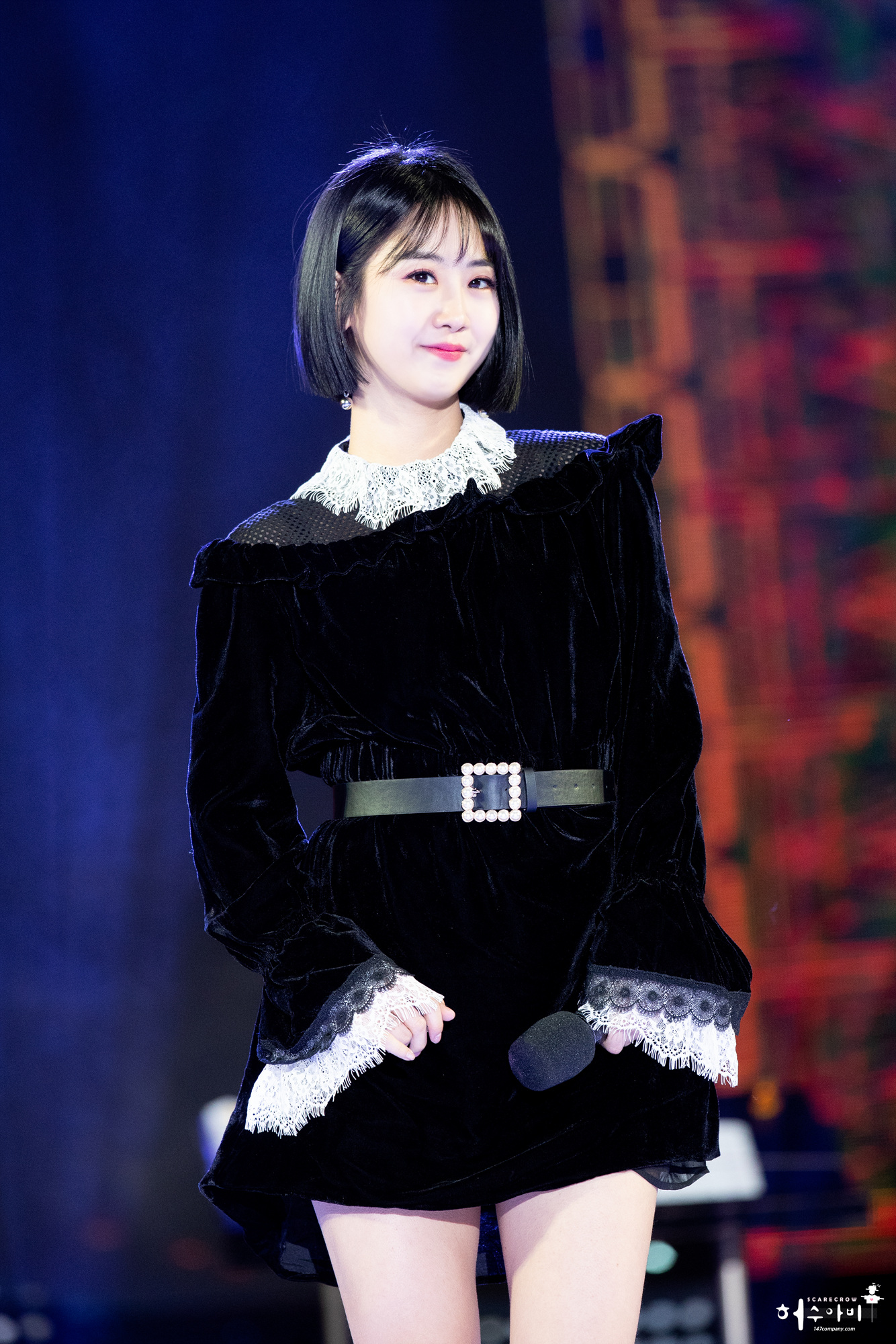
Kang in 2019

Kang rose to stardom in 2020–21 thanks to the TV show Miss Trot 2. Despite finishing in eighth place, her performance impressed the public and earned her the nickname 'Trot Squirrel'. On April 30, 2021, her first full-length album, Sunday Hye-yeon, was released. In November 2023, she once again garnered attention by participating in MBN's The Best K-Trot Singer.

In 2023 and 2024 she was appointed as promotional ambassador for South Korean islands, and in 2024 she was appointed as Jeju Island public relations ambassador. She continued group activities as Bestie reformed in October 2026.

== Discography ==
=== Studio albums ===
Title	Details
Kang Hye-yeon Mangottaeng (강혜연 만고땡)	Released: December 3, 2020; Label: Sansubak Entertainment; Formats: Digital download, streaming
Sunday Hye-yeon	Released: April 30, 2021; Label: Sansubak Entertainment; Formats: Digital download, streaming

=== Singles ===
Title	Year	Peak chart positions	Album
Title	Year	KOR DL	Album
"Waddaya" (왔다야)	2018	—	Non-album single
"Mangottaeng" (만고땡)	2020	—	Kang Hye-yeon Mangottaeng
"You Idiot" (천치 바보야)	2022	—	Non-album singles
"Comet: Broom Star" (혜성(彗星):빗자루별)	2023	169	Non-album singles
"Yeon: Beautiful" (연(姸):고울연)	2023	—	Non-album singles
"Mollado Neomu Mollanne" (몰라도 너무 몰랐네)	2025	170	Non-album singles
"Mitjimothal Namja" (믿지못할 남자)	2026	197	Non-album singles
"—" denotes releases that did not chart.

=== Collaborations ===
Title	Year	Album
"Stick With U" (붙어 있을래요) (Quattro Code feat. Hyeyeon)	2013	Non-album single
"Getting Bored?" (권태기 - 연인송) (Yoo Seung-woo feat. Hyeyeon)	2014	Yoo Seung Woo
"Perfect Chemistry" (환상의 케미) (Just Cricket feat. Hyeyeon)	2015	Perfect Chemistry Part. 1
"I Hate You So Much" (니가 너무 싫다) (with Jung Yi-han)	2018	Non-album singles
"You Can Take Your Time" (천천히 가도 돼) (Rolling Paper feat. Hyeyeon)	2018	Non-album singles
"Why Do You Call Me" (왜 불러) (with Hwang Woo-rim and Maria)	2021	Non-album singles
"Coffee Cola" (커피 콜라) (with Oh Song)	2022	내 나이는 스무살이다
"Just the Two of Us" (단 둘이서) (Nam Jin feat. Kang Hye-yeon)	2022	출입금지

=== Other releases ===
- Kang Hye-yeon Miss Trot Techno Medley (2020)
- What If I Just Leave? (2024)
