= Thank You Very Much =

Thank You Very Much may refer to:

== Songs ==
- "Thank You Very Much" (Margaret song), 2013
- "Thank You Very Much", a song from Chaz Jankel's 1983 album Chazablanca
- "Thank You Very Much", a song from Kevin Ayers' 1992 album Still Life with Guitar
- "Thank You Very Much", a song from the 1970 musical film Scrooge
- "Thank U Very Much" (The Scaffold song), 1967
- "Thank U Very Much", a song by BESTie from their 2014 album Hot Baby
- "Bahut Shukriya" (lit. 'Thank You Very Much'), a song by O. P. Nayyar, Asha Bhosle and Mohammed Rafi from the 1962 film Ek Musafir Ek Hasina

== Albums ==
- Thank You Very Much (album), a 1979 live album by Cliff Richard and the Shadows
- Thank You Very Much, a 1989 album by Rebecca Malope

== Films ==
- Thank You Very Much (film), a 2023 documentary film

== Television episodes ==
- "Thank You Very Much", a 1999 episode of Relic Hunter
