= Lee Chang-wook =

South Korean actor (born 1984)

- Born: June 2, 1984 (age 42); South Korea
- Education: Sejong University
- Occupation: Actor
- Years active: 2011–present

Korean name
- Hangul: 이창욱
- RR: I Changuk
- MR: I Ch'anguk

Lee Chang-wook (born July 2, 1984) is a South Korean actor.

== Filmography ==
Year	Title	Role	Network	Ref.
2012	Dr. Jin	Moo Myeong-gye (무명계)	MBC	
2013	Gu Am Heo Joon	Grape chief (포도부장)		
2013	Hold My Hand	Jung Hyun-soo (정현수)	MBC	
2014	Golden Cross	Jason (제이슨)	KBS2	
2015	Love on a Rooftop	Oh Gyeong-tae (오경태)	KBS2	
2015	I'm After You	Yoon Chan-yeong (윤찬영)	SBS	
2016	My Mind's Flower Rain	Lee Kang-wook (이강욱)	SBS	
2017	Lovers in Bloom	Jin Do-hyun (진도현)	KBS1	
2017	Judge vs. Judge	Jung Chae Sung	SBS	
2018	Sunny Again Tomorrow	Park Do-kyeong (박도경)	KBS1	
2020	Fatal Promise	Han Ji-hoon	KBS2	

== Film ==
- White Night (2012)
- My Way (2011)
- The Gifted Hands (2013)
- Rough Play (2013)
