= More Than Family =

South Korean family comedy film

- Theatrical release poster
- Hangul: 애비규환
- RR: Aebigyuhwan
- MR: Aebigyuhwan
- Directed by: Choi Ha-na
- Screenplay by: Choi Ha-na
- Produced by: Kim Se-hun
- Starring: Krystal Jung; Jang Hye-jin; Choi Deok-moon; Nam Moon-chul; Shin Jae-hwi
- Cinematography: Kim Ji-hyun
- Edited by: Han Ji-youn
- Music by: Park In-young
- Production companies: ATO; MOTTO
- Distributed by: Little Big Pictures
- Release dates: October 25, 2020 (BIFF); November 12, 2020 (South Korea)
- Running time: 110 minutes
- Country: South Korea
- Language: Korean
- Box office: est. US$190,327

More Than Family (Korean: 애비규환; RR: Aebigyuhwan) is a 2020 South Korean family comedy film directed by Choi Ha-na and starring Krystal Jung, Jang Hye-jin, Choi Deok-moon, Shin Jae-hwi and Nam Moon-chul. It revolves around To-il, (Krystal Jung) who gets pregnant while dating her tutoring student. The film was premiered at Busan International Film Festival on October 25, 2020. It was released in theaters in South Korea on November 12, 2020. And it was available on iQiyi on December 26 (for Indonesia, Malaysia, Philippines, Singapore, and Thailand).

== Synopsis ==
Kim To-il (Krystal Jung) gets pregnant while dating her 19 years old tutoring student. Her mother and step-father are not pleased with the situation, so she decides to track down her biological father whom she has not seen for 15 years. The journey to find him brings back memories of her birth father and her step-father. When she realizes that she wasn't ready to face her father, she runs into him. Meanwhile, her step father, Tae Hyo is disappointed that she left them to find her birth father. In her absence, the father of the baby disappears. When the two fathers meet, they end up embarking on a quest to find him, which unfolds a series of playful happenings.

== Cast ==
- Krystal Jung as Kim To-il
- Shin Jae-hwi as Jang Ho-hoon, To-Il's boyfriend
- Jang Hye-jin as Seon-myeong
- Choi Deok-moon as Tae Hyo, To-Il's stepfather
- Nam Moon-chul as Ho Hoon's father
- Lee Hae-young as Hwan Gyu
- Kang Mal-geum as Ho Hoon's mother
- Bang Jae-ho as Mediator

== Production ==
In July 2019, Krystal Jung was cast to play lead role in the film. It is debut film of Choi Ha-na as director. The filming began on August 13, 2019 and completed by the end of September 2019.

== Reception ==
=== Box office ===
The film was released on November 12, 2020.

As per review aggregator Naver Movie Database, the film holds 50th place on box office as of December 6, 2020.

Admissions Based on the Integrated Computer Network for Cinema Admission Tickets
As of	Cumulative admissions	Ref.
January 12, 2021	22,763 persons	

Admissions (persons) as of respective weekend date
Week ending	Admissions (cumulative)	Notes
As of November 22, 2020	21,835	
As of November 15, 2020	16,157	

=== Critical response ===
Going by Korean review aggregator Naver Movie Database, the film holds an approval rating of 8.21 from the audience.

== Awards and nominations ==
Year	Awards	Category	Recipient	Result	Ref.
2021	57th Baeksang Arts Awards	Best New Actress	Krystal Jung	Nominated	
2021	42nd Blue Dragon Film Awards	Best New Actress	Krystal Jung	Nominated	
2021	41st Golden Cinematography Awards	Popularity Award by Cinematographer	Krystal Jung	Won	
2021	26th Chunsa Film Art Awards	Best New Actress	Krystal Jung	Nominated	
