= Dong Ha (actor) =

South Korean actor

- Born: Kim Hyung-kyu; January 14, 1992 (age 34); South Korea
- Education: Daekyeung University
- Occupation: Actor
- Years active: 2009–present

Korean name
- Hangul: 김형규
- RR: Gim Hyeonggyu
- MR: Kim Hyŏnggyu

Stage name
- Hangul: 동하
- Hanja: 東夏
- RR: Dong Ha
- MR: Tong Ha

Dong Ha (born Kim Hyung-kyu; January 14, 1992) is a South Korean actor. He is best known for his roles in the television series Good Manager (2017), Suspicious Partner (2017), Judge vs. Judge (2017–2018), and Homemade Love Story (2020–2021).

== Personal life ==
=== Military service ===
Dong began his mandatory military service on May 1, 2018, at the 5th Infantry Division Recruit Training Center in Yeoncheon County, Gyeonggi Province. He underwent five weeks of basic training before serving as an active duty soldier. He was officially discharged on December 27, 2019.

== Filmography ==
=== Film ===
Year	Title	Role	Notes	Ref.
2010	Hero	Shim-dan		
2011	Beautiful Legacy	Kyung-tae		
2015	Intimate Enemies	Chang-joon		
2018	Default	Third generation chaebol		
2025	Cornell's Box	Kim Tae-yi		

=== Television ===
Year	Title	Role	Notes	Ref.
2009	The Accidental Couple	Kim Suk-hyun		
2013	Empire of Gold	Choi Yong-jae		
2014	Three Days	Yo-han		
2014	Glorious Day	Seo In-woo		
2015	My Heart Twinkle Twinkle	Sun-ho		
2015	This Is My Love	Young Lee Hyun-bal		
2015	Last	Samagwui ("Mantis")		
2015–2016	Glamorous Temptation	Shin Bum-soo		
2016	A Beautiful Mind	Yang Sung-eun		
2017	Good Manager	Park Myung-suk		
2017	Suspicious Partner	Jung Hyun-soo		
2017	KBS Drama Special – "You're Closer Than I Think"	Jung Soon-taek	Season 8	
2017–2018	Judge vs. Judge	Do Han-joon		
2018	Queen of Mystery 2	Park Ki-bum	Guest (episodes 5–7)	
2020	KBS Drama Special – "While You're Away"	Yi-nam	Season 11	
2020–2021	Homemade Love Story	Jang Joon-ah		
2026	Mission: Mompossible	Cha Seung-yoon		

== Theater ==
Theater performances
Year	Title		Role	Venue	Date	Ref.
Year	English	Korean	Role	Venue	Date	Ref.
2012	Bring Me My Chariot of Fire	나에게 불의 전차를	Yang Nam-sung	Tokyo's Akasaka ACT Theater	November 3 to December 1	
2012	Bring Me My Chariot of Fire	나에게 불의 전차를	Yang Nam-sung	Osaka's Umeda Arts Theater in Japan	December 8 to 11	
2013	Bring Me My Chariot of Fire	나에게 불의 전차를	Yang Nam-sung	Seoul's Haeoreum Theater of the National Theater of Korea	January 30 to February 3	

== Accolades ==
=== Awards and nominations ===
Award	Year	Category	Nominated work	Result	Ref.
6th Asia Model Awards	2011	BBF Rookie Actor of the Year	—N/a	Won	
31st KBS Drama Awards	2017	Best Supporting Actor	Good Manager & Drama Special: "You're Closer Than I Think"	Nominated	
25th SBS Drama Awards	2017	Excellence Award, Actor in a Wednesday–Thursday Drama	Judge vs. Judge	Nominated	
25th SBS Drama Awards	2017	Best New Actor	Judge vs. Judge	Nominated	
13th Soompi Awards	2018	Breakout Actor	Good Manager	Nominated	

=== Listicles ===
Name of publisher, year listed, name of listicle, and placement
Publisher	Year	Listicle	Placement	Ref.
Sports Dong-a	2018	The Star that Will Shine in 2018 (Actor)	Shortlist (Note: Shortlisted with Kim Seon-ho, Seo Eun-soo, Won Jin-ah, and Ha Jun)	
