= Bestie (group) =

South Korean girl group

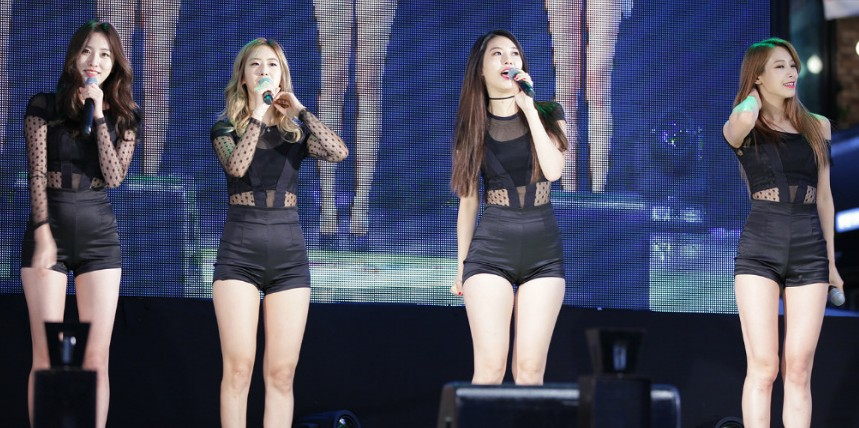
- Bestie at the Pyeongchon Cultural Street Festival in September 2015

Background information
- Origin: Seoul, South Korea
- Genre: K-pop
- Years active: 2013–2018; 2026–present
- Label: YNB
- Members: Hyeyeon; Uji; Dahye; Haeryung

Bestie (Korean: 베스티, stylized as BESTie) is a South Korean girl group that consists of Hyeyeon, Uji, Dahye and Haeryung. Formed by YNB Entertainment, the group debuted in July 2013.

Throughout their career, the group has released two EPs—Hot Baby (2013) and Love Emotion (2015)—and two standalone singles—their debut single "Pitapat" (2013) and Christmas single "Zzang Christmas" (2013). After Uji and Dahye parted their ways with YNB Entertainment in September 2017, the group unofficially disbanded in 2018 following the news of Hyeyeon joining a new agency.

In May 2026, their single "Love Options" from the EP Hot Baby re-entered the YouTube Music Daily Top 10 13 years after release, and later charted on the Melon Top 100, which led to the group reuniting and performing on MBC's Show! Music Core on October 31.

== History ==
=== 2013: Debut and digital singles ===
Hyeyeon, Uji, and Haeryung were previously in another girl group, EXID, before taking their leave for personal reasons, as the former two left to complete their studies, while the latter also left to focus on her acting career. With the addition of Dahye, they debuted as a group on July 11, 2013, with the release of their first single "Pitapat" and its music video, starring Jo Kwon and Yoo Se-yoon. The group held their debut live performance on KBS Music Bank on July 12.

On October 17, they released their second single "Love Options". Their first performance was on M! Countdown. In December, Hyeyeon featured on Quattro Code's single "Stick With You" and Bestie released the digital single "Zzang Christmas".

=== 2014–2015: Hot Baby and Love Emotion ===
On February 28, 2014, they released "Thank U Very Much" as a digital released with an accompanying music video. On June 27, they performed a cover of Girls' Generation's "Mr.Mr." with AOA member's Jimin, Choa, Chanmi and Hyejeong, and Girl's Day, on Music Bank. On July 11, Bestie released their fifth digital single "Like A Star" in celebration of their one-year anniversary. "Like A Star", as well as their previous singles "Pitapat" and "Thank U Very Much", were featured on their first EP Hot Baby, released on July 28. The music video for the EP's title track "Hot Baby" was released three days later. The EP charted at No. 7, and on August 29, Bestie released a repackaged version titled I Need You. The repackage featured the new single "I Need You", produced by Duble Sidekick and HomeBoy. In September, Hyeyeon featured on Yoo Seung-woo's single "Lovers' Song", and on December 19, Bestie covered Super Junior's "Mamacita" on Music Bank as a year-end performance.

The group's second EP Love Emotion was released on May 8, 2015, and charted at No. 8. The music video for its lead single "Excuse Me" was ranked fourth on Billboard's list of "Most Viewed K-Pop Videos in America" and sixth on its list of "Most Viewed K-Pop Videos around the World" for the month of May. On August 29, Bestie performed at New Delhi's Sirifort Auditorium as part of the 2015 Feel Korea in New Delhi tour. That year, the group won the Next Generation Award at the Golden Disk Awards. They also collaborated with other artists, with Uji collaborating with The Channels on the single "Love Letter" and Chad Future's "So Good", Dahye featuring on Yoo Se-yoon's "We Fought", and Hyeyeon featuring on Just Cricket's "Perfect Chemistry".

=== 2016–2018: Planned comeback, members departure and disbandment ===
In January 2016, Dahye fell from the stairs, fracturing her ankle and right arm; the group's comeback was consequently postponed by two months. In March, it was announced that Bestie would be coming back in May with an EP or a full-length album, which ultimately never happened. In September, Uji participated in JTBC reality singing competition Girl Spirit, where she finished in the top 5. The group's last performance was on December 16, 2016, at Military Year End Concert. A few days later, Uji stated that the group was "still preparing a new album, but we're really thinking about it and making sure it comes out properly and shows a great performance."

On September 5, 2017, YNB Entertainment announced that Uji and Dahye would be leaving the group after termination of their contracts, while Hyeyeon and Haeryung would be continuing as a group, with the possibility that new members would be added. That month, it was also confirmed that Hyeyeon would be appearing on the idol competition program The Unit. She was eliminated from the show in episode 13 with her final rank being 27. The group disbanded in 2018. Hyeyeon transitioned to trot, Uji became a musical actress, Dahye continued as a soloist and influencer, while Haeryung reprised her acting career in television.

=== 2026–present: Viral resurgence and reunion ===
In September 2026, their 2013 song "Love Options" experienced a resurgence in popularity, which was also reflected in its chart performance, after going viral in short-form challenges on YouTube Shorts. On October 16, the group announced they were reuniting after 8 years since their disbandment. They subsequently made a comeback on Show! Music Core on October 31, their first music show performance in 11 years, and kept appearing on music shows throughout November as "Love Options" continued its rise, peaking at 5th on the Melon Top 100 on November 16. It also entered the Billboard Global 200 in the chart issue dated November 21, 2026 at number 145, their first song to appear on the chart.

== Members ==
- Hyeyeon (혜연)
- Uji (유지)
- Dahye (다혜)
- Haeryung (해령)

== Discography ==
=== Extended plays ===
Title	Details	Peak chart positions		Sales
Title	Details	KOR	JPN Hot	Sales
Hot Baby	Released: July 28, 2014; Label: YNB Entertainment; Format: CD, digital download, streaming	7	76	KOR: 4,636
Love Emotion	Released: May 8, 2015; Label: YNB Entertainment; Format: CD, digital download, streaming	8	—	KOR: 3,945
"—" denotes releases that did not chart or were not released in that region.

=== Singles ===
Title	Year	Peak chart positions									Sales	Album
Title	Year	KOR	KOR Hot	HK	JPN Cmb.	JPN Hot	SGP	TWN	VIE Hot	WW	Sales	Album
"Pitapat"	2013	84	90	—	—	—	—	—	—	—	KOR: 42,588	Non-album single
"Love Options"	2013	10	—	10	69	43	15	1	85	145	KOR: 56,557	Hot Baby
"Zzang Christmas" (featuring Yoo Se-yoon)	2013	130	—	—	—	—	—	—	—	—	KOR: 18,994	Non-album single
"Thank U Very Much"	2014	53	74	—	—	—	—	—	—	—	KOR: 88,337	Hot Baby
"Like a Star"	2014	—	—	—	—	—	—	—	—	—	—N/a	Hot Baby
"Hot Baby"	2014	53	—	—	—	—	—	—	—	—	KOR: 83,228	Hot Baby
"I Need You"	2014	74	—	—	—	—	—	—	—	—	KOR: 59,824	Hot Baby
"Excuse Me"	2015	74	—	—	—	—	—	—	—	—	KOR: 50,837	Love Emotion
"—" denotes releases that did not chart or were not released in that region.

=== Collaborations ===
Year	Song	Member(s)	Artist	Album
2013	"Stick With You"	Hyeyeon	Quattro Code	Quattro Code Project
2014	"Lovers' Song"	Hyeyeon	Yoo Seung-woo	Yoo Seung-woo
2015	"Love Letter"	UJi	The Channels	Non-album singles
2015	"We Fought"	Dahye	Yoo Se-yoon feat. Hae-yong of Almeng	Non-album singles
2015	"Perfect Chemistry"	Hyeyeon	Just Cricket	Non-album singles
2015	"So Good"	UJi	Chad Future	2nd Mini Album

=== Music videos ===
Year	Title	Director(s)	Notes
2013	"Pitapat"	Joo Hee-sun	—N/a
2013	"Love Options"	Wani (Jong Wan) Kim	—N/a
2013	"Zzang Christmas"	Unknown	—N/a
2014	"Thank U Very Much"	Hong Won-ki	—N/a
2014	"Like a Star"	Unknown	—N/a
2014	"Hot Baby"	Z	—N/a
2015	"Love Letter"	Unknown	UJi feat. The Channels
2015	"Excuse Me"	Hong Won-ki	—N/a

== Awards and nominations ==
Name of the award ceremony, year presented, category, nominee of the award, and the result of the nomination
Award ceremony	Year	Category	Nominee / Work	Result	Ref.
Golden Disc Awards	2015	Next Generation Award (Album)	Bestie	Won	
