= My Lovely Girl =

2014 South Korean television series

- Promotional poster
- Also known as: My Lovable Girl; Too Lovely Girl For Me; She's So Lovable
- Hangul: 내겐 너무 사랑스러운 그녀
- RR: Naegen neomu sarangseureoun geunyeo
- MR: Naegen nŏmu sarangsŭrŏun kŭnyŏ
- Genre: Romance, musical, drama
- Written by: Noh Ji-seol
- Directed by: Park Hyung-ki
- Starring: Rain; Krystal Jung; Kim Myung-soo; Cha Ye-ryun
- Country of origin: South Korea
- Original language: Korean
- No. of episodes: 16

Production
- Running time: 60 minutes
- Production company: AStory

Original release
- Network: Seoul Broadcasting System
- Release: September 17 – November 6, 2014

My Lovely Girl (Korean: 내겐 너무 사랑스러운 그녀; RR: Naegen neomu sarangseureoun geunyeo) is a 2014 South Korean television series starring Rain, Krystal Jung, Kim Myung-soo, and Cha Ye-ryun. Having the K-pop industry as the backdrop, the drama tells the story of two pained individuals who find healing through music. It aired on SBS from September 17 to November 6, 2014 on Wednesdays and Thursdays at 21:55 for 16 episodes.

== Synopsis ==
Lee Hyun-wook (Rain) is the CEO of a talent agency that scouts and trains idols. Hyun-wook lives in great difficulty as he is unable to let go of his ex-girlfriend who died in an accident 3 years ago, which he witnessed firsthand. His ex-girlfriend's sister, Yoon Se-na (Krystal), moves to Seoul in order to pursue her music-composing career, and meets Hyun-wook, who helps her achieve it. As Hyun-wook replaces his father (Park Yeong-gyu) as the president of ANA Entertainment, he faces challenges in his career. In the midst of healing each other through music, Hyun-wook and Se-na fall in love.

== Cast ==
=== Main ===
- Rain as Lee Hyun-wook

A successful singer, songwriter and producer. He appears cold and indifferent on the outside, but is really sensitive and kind-hearted. After So-eun's death, he left the music industry as he couldn't write songs any more. When he receives a call from Se-na, he looks for her and eventually brings her into his company, ANA Entertainment. As he falls in love with Se-na, he is able to write songs again.

- Krystal Jung as Yoon Se-na

An aspiring singer and songwriter, and sister of Yoon So-eun. She becomes acquainted with Hyun-wook while trying to find her sister, and she later develops feelings for him. She has a bickering relationship with Shi-woo, and is continuously wavered by his advances.

- Kim Myung-soo as Shi-woo/Yong-bok

A member of boyband Infinite Power under ANA Entertainment. He is seemingly arrogant, but he turns kinder to Yoon Se-na, whom he develops feelings for. He is at constant conflicts over Lee Hyun-wook, who chastises him for his irresponsible actions, as well as due to their rivalry for Se-na's love.

- Cha Ye-ryun as Shin Hae-yoon

One of the directors in ANA Entertainment. She has a long-term crush on Lee Hyun-wook, and constantly disrupts his relationships with both Se-na and So-eun.

=== Supporting ===
==== People in AnA Entertainment ====
- Alex Chu as Bae Sung-jin
- Kim Jin-woo as Seo Jae-young
- Kim Ki-bang as Yoo Sang-bong
- Lee Soo-ji as An Da-jung
- Jo Hee-bong as Kang Tae-min
- Na Hae-ryung as Yoo Ra-eum

Shi-woo's ex-girlfriend and Rae-hoon's current girlfriend.

- Hoya as Kang Rae-hoon

Leader of fictional idol group Infinite Power.

- Lee Dae-yeol as San-ah

Member of fictional idol group Infinite Power.

- Choi Sung-yoon as Jun-jun

Member of fictional idol group Infinite Power.

- Gong Seung-yeon as Seo Yoon-ji
- Fiestar as Fiestar
- Choi Hyo-eun as Mi-sung

==== Others ====
- Park Young-gyu as Lee Jong-ho

Hyun-wook's father.

- Kim Hye-eun as Oh Hee-seon
- Kim Dani as Lee Min-ah
- Lee Cho-hee as Joo-hong
- Park Doo-shik as Cha Gong-chul
- Lee Shi-ah as Yoon So-eun (cameo)
  - Lee Soo-min as young Yoon So-eun (cameo)

Hyun-wook's ex-girlfriend who died in a car accident.

== Production ==
This drama is Director Park Hyung-ki and Writer Noh Ji-seol's third collaboration after Scent of a Woman and Dr. Champ. The first read-through was held in August 2014 at an SBS studio in Ilsan. A press conference was held on September 15, 2014.

== Original soundtrack ==
My Lovely Girl: Original Sound Track

Soundtrack album by Various Artists
- Released: November 6, 2014
- Genres: Pop, K-pop, soundtrack, R&B
- Labels: AStory, LOEN Entertainment

No.	Title	Artist	Length
1.	"This Song" (이 노래)	Loco and Mamamoo	3:49
2.	"Crazy Boy" (개또라이)	Park Mi Young	0:51
3.	"All of a Sudden" (울컥)	Krystal Jung	4:26
4.	"Will You Love Me" (사랑해줄래)	Alex Chu	3:55
5.	"Pray" (Female version)	Joo-yi	3:15
6.	"Pray" (Male version)	In4mal	3:25
7.	"Promise"	Kim Bo Kyung	3:45
8.	"Only U" (너 하나만)	Kim Tae-woo	3:14
9.	"I Know"	Kim Bo Kyung	3:53
10.	"My Lovely Girl" (내겐 너무 사랑스러운 그녀)	G.Brown	3:35
11.	"Rewind"	Gavy NJ	4:13
12.	"Calling Out" (불러본다)	Jin Min Ho	3:55
13.	"Super Stiction"	Halo	3:44
14.	"Tight" (타이트해)	Fiestar	3:30
15.	"It's Okay I Love You"	Lee Simon	3:25

== Ratings ==
Episode #	Original broadcast date	Average audience share			
Episode #	Original broadcast date	TNmS Ratings		AGB Nielsen	
Episode #	Original broadcast date	Nationwide	Seoul National Capital Area	Nationwide	Seoul National Capital Area
1	September 17, 2014	8.2%	9.9%	8.2%	9.2%
2	September 18, 2014	8.1%	10.9%	7.5%	8.3%
3	September 24, 2014	7.0%	9.1%	7.8%	8.7%
4	September 25, 2014	7.2%	8.6%	7.3%	8.4%
5	October 1, 2014	6.2%	7.0%	6.9%	7.8%
6	October 2, 2014	4.7%	5.8%	4.7%	5.4%
7	October 8, 2014	6.5%	7.4%	6.4%	7.3%
8	October 9, 2014	8.1%	9.5%	6.6%	7.4%
9	October 15, 2014	6.4%	7.4%	5.7%	6.3%
10	October 16, 2014	7.1%	8.5%	6.9%	7.1%
11	October 23, 2014	6.0%	6.5%	6.9%	7.9%
12	October 29, 2014	5.1%	6.1%	5.7%	6.6%
13	October 30, 2014	5.4%	5.5%	5.6%	6.0%
14	November 5, 2014	5.7%	6.1%	5.0%	5.7%
15	November 5, 2014	4.9%	5.1%	3.9%	4.7%
16	November 6, 2014	5.6%	6.6%	5.5%	5.7%
Average		6.4%	7.5%	6.3%	7.0%
