= Krystal Jung =

American and South Korean singer and actress (born 1994)

- Jung in September 2026
- Born: Chrystal Soo Jung; October 24, 1994 (age 32); San Francisco, California, U.S.
- Other name: Jung Soo-jung (Note: A screenshot of Jung's Korean passport is shown.)
- Citizenship: United States; South Korea
- Education: Hanlim Multi Art School
- Occupations: Singer; actress
- Years active: 2009–present
- Relatives: Jessica Jung (sister)
- Awards: Full list
- Musical career
- Genre: K-pop
- Instrument: Vocals
- Years active: 2009–present
- Labels: SM; H&; BANA
- Member of: f(x)
- Formerly of: SM the Ballad

Korean name
- Hangul: 정수정
- RR: Jeong Sujeong
- MR: Chŏng Sujŏng

Signature
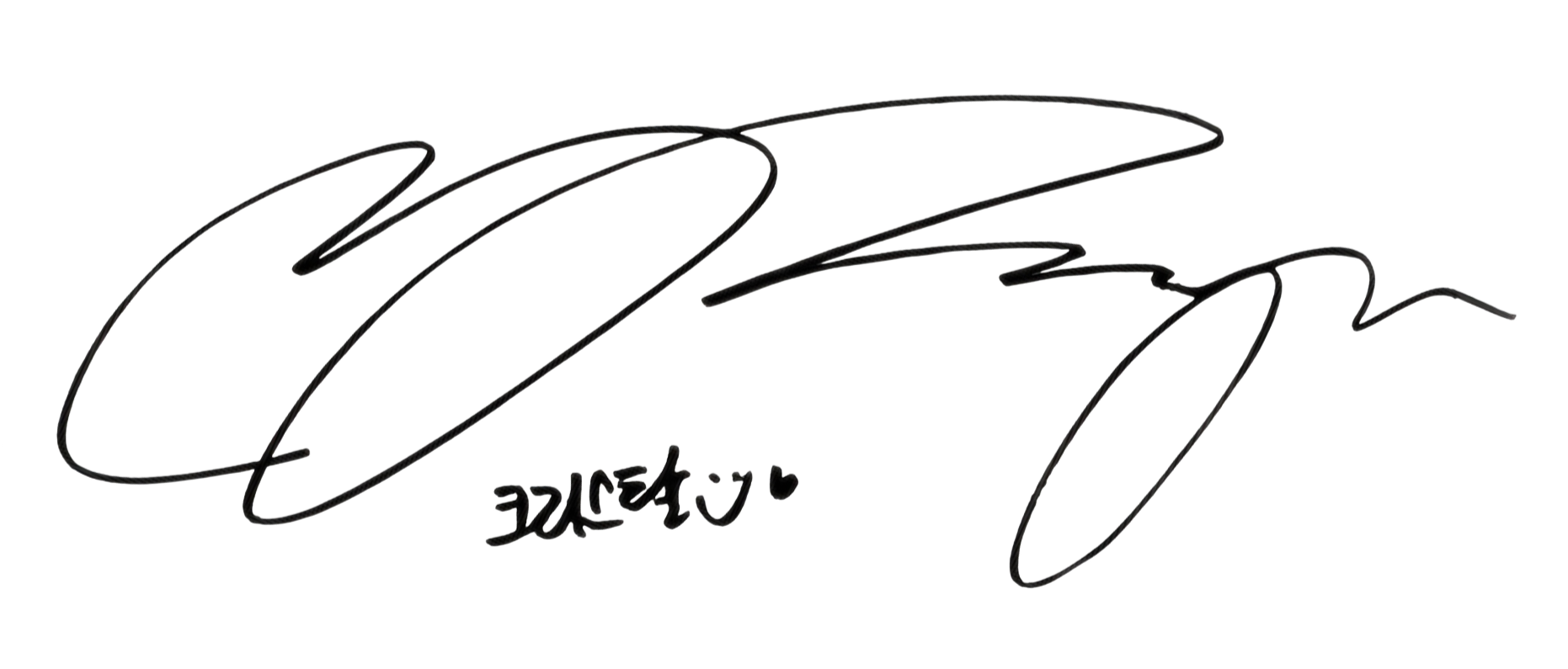

Chrystal Soo Jung (Korean: 정수정; born October 24, 1994), known professionally as Krystal Jung, is an American and South Korean singer and actress. She debuted in 2009 as a member of the South Korean girl group f(x) and has further participated in SM Entertainment's project group SM the Ballad. Aside from group activities, she has also acted in various South Korean drama series such as The Heirs (2013), My Lovely Girl (2014), Prison Playbook (2017), The Bride of Habaek (2017), Player (2018), Search (2020), Police University (2021), and Crazy Love (2022).

== Early life and education ==
Jung was born as Chrystal Soo Jung in San Francisco, California, where her family settled from South Korea in the 1980s. She holds dual citizenship in the United States and South Korea.

During a family trip to South Korea in early 2000, at the age of five, Jung and her sister Jessica Jung were spotted by SM Entertainment, which earned her a cameo appearance in Shinhwa's "Wedding March" music video. SM offered Jung and her sister singing and dancing lessons in order to professionally train them for a music career. However, the offer was turned down by her parents, who reasoned that she was too young, so they only allowed her sister to join the company at first. Her sister later debuted as a member of the girl group Girls' Generation. They have since appeared together in many events.

After moving to South Korea, Jung attended Korea Kent Foreign School, then graduated from Hanlim Multi Art School on February 7, 2013, where she was honored with an achievement award. She also attended Sungkyunkwan University, where she majored in Theater.

== Career ==
=== 2002–2006: Pre-debut activities ===
In 2002, Jung began appearing in television commercials. She first appeared in a Lotte commercial with South Korean actress Han Ga-in. In 2006, her parents finally allowed her to join SM, and the agency then enrolled her in dance-classes. She was trained for 3 years before debuting as a part of f(x) in 2009.

In 2006, Jung made a brief appearance in Rain's music video for "I Still Believe," and later appeared in Shinee's 2009 music video for "Juliette," portraying the female lead.

=== 2009–2011: Debut with f(x) and television shows ===
Jung debuted as vocalist of the South Korean girl group f(x) in September 2009. That year, she and her f(x) bandmate Luna released the duet "Hard but Easy", a soundtrack for the KBS2 drama Invincible Lee Pyung Kang.

In March 2010, Jung participated in a series of music videos under the Melody Project, playing a young student who is in love with her music teacher. She released a solo single titled "Melody" for this project. Jung then became a host for the music show The M-Wave with Thunder from MBLAQ. In July, the singer debuted as an actress with a minor role in the long-running sitcom More Charming by the Day. She received the "Newcomer Comedy Award" at the 2010 MBC Entertainment Awards for the role.

In 2011, Jung participated in and won first place in SBS's figure-skating show Kim Yuna's Kiss & Cry. She also starred in the sitcom High Kick 3, playing the role of a superficial and shallow girl who does not have much depth of feelings.

=== 2013–2017: SM The Ballad, collaborative music work, and acting career ===
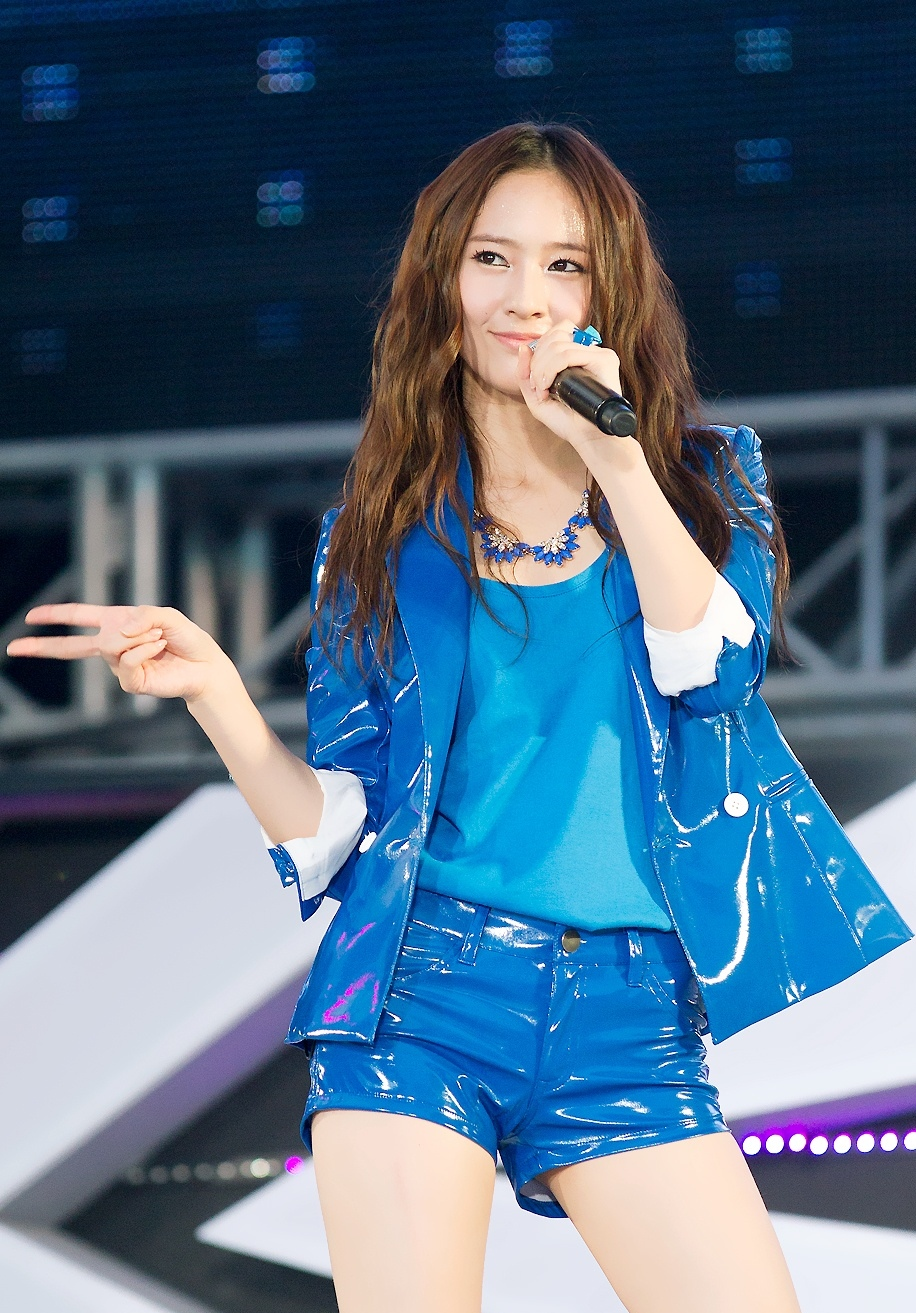
Jung performing at the SM Town Live World Tour III in 2012

In 2013, Jung starred in the SBS teen drama The Heirs, playing the role of a spoiled yet kind-hearted wealthy high school student. Her character in the show generated positive recognition among viewers, and she was voted as the Best Onscreen Couple along with CNBLUE's Kang Min-hyuk at the 2013 DramaFever Awards.

In 2014, Jung joined the ballad group SM the Ballad, initially formed by SM Entertainment in 2010. On the group's 2nd album Breath, she sang the Japanese version of the title track "Breath" with TVXQ's Changmin. She also sang a duet with Exo's Chen titled "When I Was... When U Were...". Jung performed her duet with Chen live at the S.M. The Ballad Joint Recital on February 12. In June, Jung, along with her sister Jessica, was featured in the reality show, Jessica & Krystal. The show took on a more close and personal side of the two sisters, addressing their public image and sisterly bond.

Later in the year, Jung got her first leading role in the SBS's drama My Lovely Girl, alongside Rain. She portrayed a girl who moves from the countryside to Seoul to pursue a music career and ends up meeting a fateful love during the process. Commenting on Jung's work attitude, Director Park Hyung-ki stated "Despite taking on a difficult character, she shows her determination to pull it off through her gaze to the point you can see sincerity in Krystal when she's in front of the camera." She released a solo single "All of a Sudden" for the drama's OST. At the Baeksang Arts Awards, Jung won the "Most Popular Actress" award in the television category for her role in the drama. She also released "Say Yes"' for the Make Your Move soundtrack, featuring her sister, Jessica, and Exo's former member, Kris.

In 2015, Jung starred alongside actor Seo Jun-young in a 10-minute film entitled, Listen To My Song for W Korea's 10th anniversary. Jung was also cast in leading roles in an upcoming Chinese movie, titled Unexpected Love along with Exo's Lay; and in the Chinese drama Graduation Season alongside Deng Lun.

On February 12, 2017, it was reported that Jung would release the collaboration single "I Don't Wanna Love You" with Glen Check's member June One Kim. The song was revealed for the first time on February 14 at the re-opening of a clothing store in Seoul, and then be released online at midnight KST on February 15. In July, Jung starred in tvN's drama spin-off of the Korean manhwa Bride of the Water God. The same year she starred in the black comedy drama Prison Playbook, produced by Reply PD Shin Won-ho, where she played a cheerful and determined medical student and the ex-girlfriend of the main character. She received good reviews for her performance. Jung was named 'Woman of the Year' by GQ Korea.

=== 2018–present: Continued acting career and labels transition ===
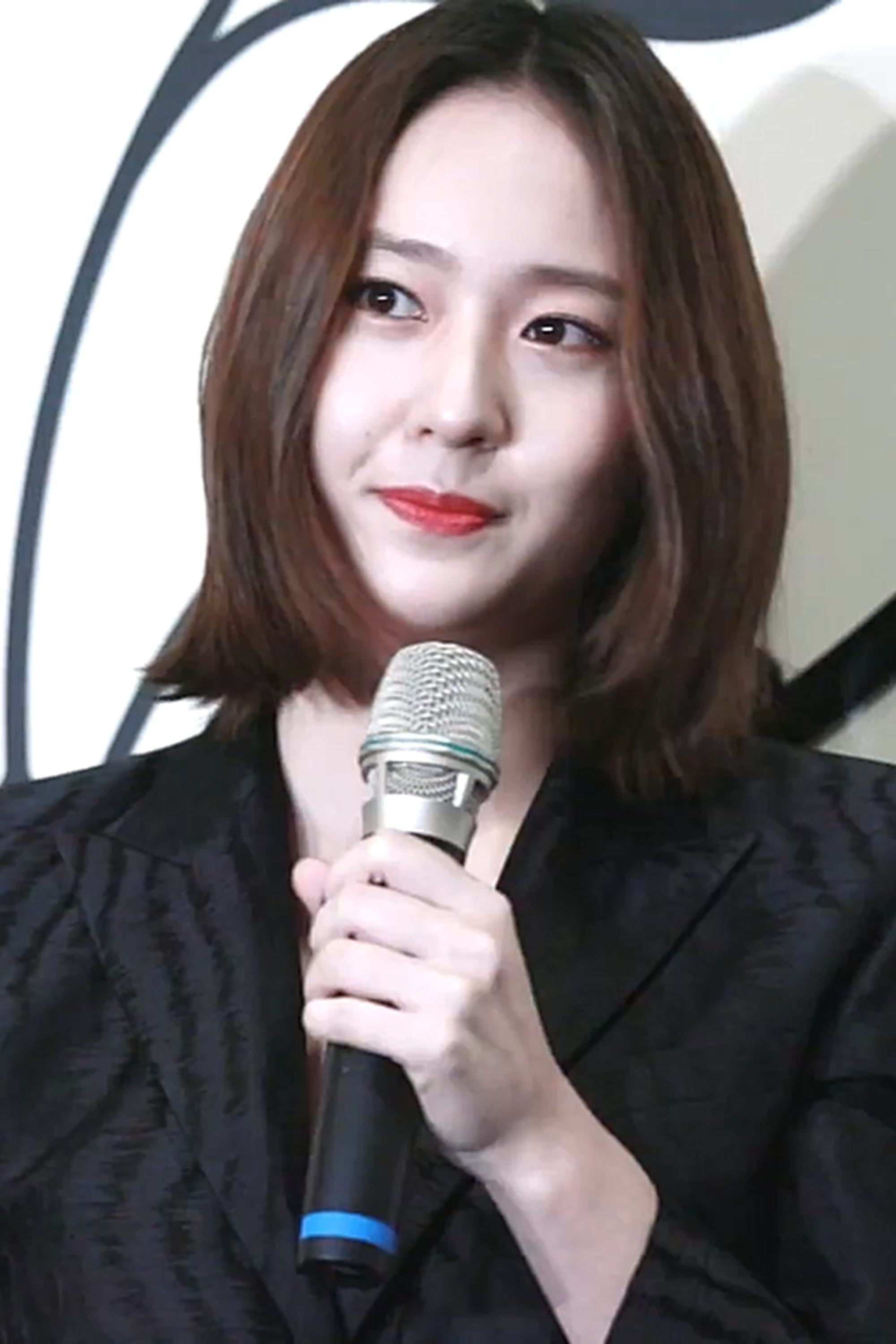
Jung during a Givenchy event in 2018

In 2018, Jung was cast as the female lead in OCN's crime action drama Player, as Cha Ah-ryung, a highly skilled driver who ran away from orphanage. At the press conference for the drama, Jung stated that she learned how to ride a motorcycle in order to do her own stunts.

In 2019, Jung and her sister Jessica filmed their second reality show in the United States where they traveled across their homeland, exploring fashion, music, and culture while reminiscing about their childhood memories, titled Jessica & Krystal: US Road Trip which was released in 2021. The same year, she made her film debut in the independent romance More Than Family, playing To-il, a pregnant college student searching for her estranged father. She also starred in the Netflix-released romantic comedy Sweet & Sour, marking her commercial film debut.

In 2020, Jung was cast in OCN's military cinematic drama Search, where she played an elite army officer. The drama premiered on October 17, 2020. After reports began swirling of Jung departing SM Entertainment, SM responded that their contract with her would expire by the end of August 2020, and they were in discussions with her for a possible renewal. Krystal's departure from SM was officially announced in October 2020 and signed with H& Entertainment as her new agency.

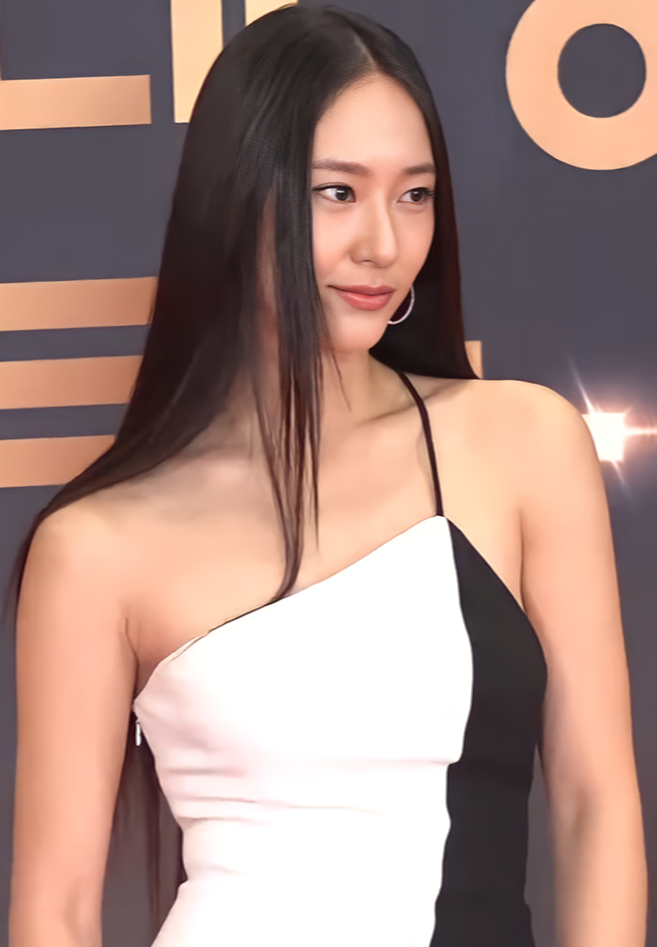
Jung at KBS Drama Awards in 2022

In 2021, Jung starred in KBS2's drama Police University, playing Oh Kang-hee, a freshman at Korean National Police University, alongside Cha Tae-hyun and Jinyoung.

In 2022, Jung starred alongside Kim Jae-wook in the KBS2's romantic-comedy Crazy Love, playing Lee Shin-ah, a quiet but capable secretary whose life takes an unexpected turn. For her performance, she received the "Popularity Award", at the 2022 KBS Drama Awards.

In 2023, Jung starred in Cobweb, a period black comedy-drama film directed by Kim Jee-woon. It was premiered in the non-competitive section at the 2023 Cannes Film Festival. She received the "Best New Actress" award at the 33rd Buil Film Awards, and the "Best Supporting Actress" award at the Chunsa Film Art Awards 2023 for the role.

In February 2024, Jung released cover song of Leila Hathaway's "I'm Coming Back" through SoundCloud and also confirmed to join the label Beasts & Natives (BANA). Later in the same year, she made a special appearance in The Player 2: Master of Swindlers, the sequel to the 2018 drama Player. in which she starred as Cha Ah-ryung.

In January 2025, Jung was confirmed to star in the film Audition 109, co-directed by Jung Woo and Oh Seong Ho. In March 2025, Jung was selected as the ambassador for French Film Week, which was scheduled to take place from April 4 to 13. During a Q&A session following a general screening of the film Suspended Time, she revealed that she had been preparing for her solo album.

In April 2025, Jung starred as a special guest role in the fantasy romance drama Way Back Love as a senior grim reaper. The episode premiered on April 15.

In July 2025, it was confirmed that Jung would star in the tvN drama Mad Concrete Dreams alongside Ha Jung-woo, Im Soo-jung, Kim Jun-han, and Shim Eun-kyung. She is set to play Jeon Yi-kyung, a character who assists her mother's real estate business. The drama is scheduled to air in the first half of 2026.

On November 6, 2025, Jung announced through her agency BANA's official YouTube channel, released episode 1 of her solo album production series Charging Crystals and announced would release her solo album's first single "Solitary" on November 27.

== Impact ==
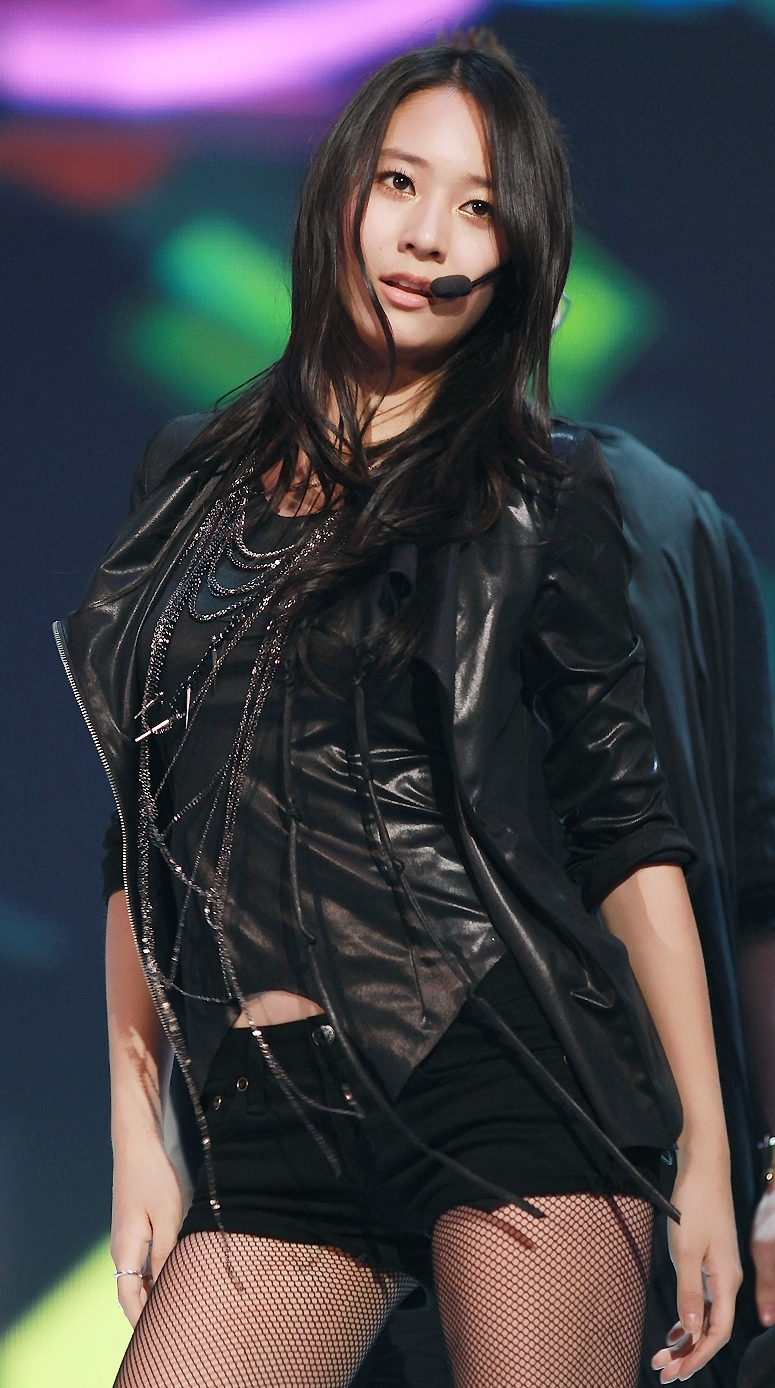
Jung in 2010

Jung has made a significant impact in K-pop, acting, and fashion. As a member of f(x), she contributed to shaping the group's distinctive sound and image, gaining recognition for her charismatic stage presence. In 2015, American music magazine Spin called f(x) the "world's greatest living pop group" at the time. In 2017, Billboard ranked f(x) at number seven on their "Top 10 K-pop Girl Groups of the Past Decade" list. Beyond her music career, Jung also has successful acting career, with notable roles in popular K-dramas like The Heirs, and Prison Playbook, as well as in the movie Cobweb.

In 2020, Cine21 ranked her fifth among "New Actresses That Will Lead the Korean Video Content Industry in 2021,". She was also included in Cine21's 2024 "Korean Film NEXT 50" list.

== Other ventures ==
=== Endorsements and ambassadorship ===
In 2010, Jung, alongside Seohyun from Girls' Generation, became a model for Clean & Clear, and in 2012, she partnered with actress Kim Ji-won for the brand's campaigns. In 2013, Jung and her sister Jessica became the faces of the South Korean jewelry brand Stonehenge. That same year, Jung and group mate Sulli became the new faces of the makeup brand Etude House. During their tenure, they collaborated with labelmate Shinee, who were also models for the brand at that time. This partnership continued until 2014, after which Krystal continued her association with the brand as a solo model until 2017. Later that year, she participated in Adidas' "My Girls" campaign, which aimed to inspire and empower women through sports and fitness activities.

In 2014, She became a model for Chinese sports brand Li-Ning and South Korean bag brand Lapalette with her sister Jessica.

Jung represented Keds as a global ambassador from 2015 to 2020. In 2016, she became one the faces of the brand's "Ladies First" campaign, which aimed to celebrate and empower women.

In 2016, Jung became Tod's first Asian model, she was featured in their "Italian Diaries" campaign, a short film showcasing the Spring/Summer 2017 collection, where she explored the city of Venice.

In 2018, Jung was appointed as a brand ambassador for Clio Cosmetics and continued to feature in their campaigns through 2020. Later that year, she was selected as the ambassador for Audi in South Korea, representing the luxury automaker in various global campaigns and events. Jung and her sister Jessica were featured in Fendi's "Me and My Peekaboo" campaign.

In 2021, Jung was announced as the global brand spokesperson for AHC, a South Korean skincare brand.

In 2020, Jung was selected as the global ambassador of Ralph Lauren. That same year, she was named the model for Tsubaki, a premium Japanese hair care brand.

Jung became the first-ever global brand ambassador for Charles & Keith in 2022.

In 2023, Jung was chosen as the ambassador of Lancôme, and became Pomellato's first South Korean brand ambassador.

In 2024, Jung was appointed as the official brand ambassador for SW19, a fragrance brand. She headlined their "I Am Now" campaign, which emphasized themes of self-expression and individuality.

In February 2025, Jung collaborated with Adidas Originals for the inaugural "House of Wild" project, a creative initiative celebrating individuality and self-expression. This collaboration was prominently featured in Esquire Korea and Eyes Magazine.

In March 2025, Jung was appointed as the ambassador for "French Film Week" in South Korea, which was scheduled to take place from April 4 to 13 in Seoul and Busan. Organized by the French Embassy's cultural service in collaboration with Megabox's Artnine and the Busan Cinema Center.

=== Philanthropy ===
Jung has been involved in various charitable initiatives, both individually and as a member of f(x). In 2010, she, along with f(x) members Luna, Victoria, and Sulli, took part in a charity event organized by Crown Bakery and the Heart to Heart Foundation, spending time with children at a community childcare center and decorating "Crown Art Bears" to support underprivileged youth. In 2011, she performed with f(x) at a K-pop charity concert in Osaka, Japan, to raise funds for disaster relief following the 2011 Tōhoku earthquake and tsunami.

In 2013, to celebrate her birthday, she and her fans donated approximately 30 kilograms of Hanwoo beef to the Korea Childhood Leukemia Foundation, supporting children undergoing cancer treatment. In 2015, she donated a signed doll to a UNICEFKorea fundraising campaign to support children affected by the Nepal earthquake, contributing to the relief efforts through charity auction. The same year, she and her sister, Jessica, attended W Korea's "Love Your W" charity event, which raises awareness and funds for breast cancer research and treatment.

In June 2018, Jung took part in the CJ Cultivating Dreams Classroom event held at Yongchang Elementary School in Yunnan, China. The program, organized by CJ Group in collaboration with the Korea Foundation for International Cultural Exchange and Chinese organizations, aimed to support underprivileged youth through cultural and educational exchange. For her contribution, Jung was awarded a plaque of appreciation by the China Friendship Foundation for Peace and Development.

In 2024, Jung once again participated in the "Love Your W", a charity event for breast cancer awareness held by W Korea.

== Discography ==
=== Single albums ===
List of single albums, with selected details, chart positions and sales
Title	Details	Peak chart positions	Sales
Title	Details	KOR	Sales
Solitary	Released: November 27, 2025; Label: Beasts And Natives Alike; Formats: CD, digital download, streaming	16	KOR: 38,246
PWLT	Released: June 26, 2026; Label: Beasts And Natives Alike; Formats: CD, digital download, streaming	18	KOR: 13,324

=== Singles ===
Title	Year	Peak chart positions	Sales	Album
Title	Year	KOR Gaon	Sales	Album
As lead artist
"Solitary"	2025	— (Note: "Solitary" did not enter the Circle Digital Chart, but peaked at number 18 on the Circle Download Chart.)	KOR: 38,246	Solitary
"PWLT"	2026	— (Note: "PWLT" did not enter the Circle Digital Chart, but peaked at number 54 on the Circle Download Chart.)	KOR: 13,324	PWLT
Collaborations
"The Way an Idol Breaks Up" (with Kim Hee-chul)	2010	—	N/A	Super Show 3 (album)
"When I Was... When U Were..." (with Chen)	2014	31	KOR: 76,017	SM the Ballad Vol. 2 – Breath
"Breath" (Japanese Ver.) (with Changmin)	2014	—	N/A	SM the Ballad Vol. 2 – Breath
"I Don't Wanna Love You" (with June One Kim of Glen Check)	2017	—	N/A	Non-album single
Promotional singles
"Melody"	2010	—	N/A	Melody Project Part II – Moderato
"—" denotes a recording that did not chart or was not released in that territory

=== Soundtrack appearances ===
Title	Year	Peak chart positions	Sales	Album
Title	Year	KOR Gaon	Sales	Album
"Hard but Easy" (with Luna)	2009	—	N/A	Invincible Lee Pyung Kang OST
"Spread Its Wings" (with Luna X Amber)	2010	—	N/A	God of Study OST
"Calling Out" (with Luna)	2010	—	N/A	Cinderella's Sister OST
"Because of Me"	2011	—	N/A	Sign OST
"Grumbling" (with Leeteuk)	2011	—	N/A	Sunday Night – Enjoy Today OST
"Butterfly" (with Jessica)	2012	22	KOR: 300,352	To the Beautiful You OST
"Say Yes" (with Jessica and Kris)	2014	—	N/A	Make Your Move OST
"All of a Sudden"	2014	25	KOR: 167,163	My Lovely Girl OST
"—" denotes a recording that did not chart or was not released in that territory

== Filmography ==
Key
†	Denotes films that have not yet been released

=== Film ===
Year	Title	Role	Notes	Ref.
2015	Listen to My Song	Herself	Short film in celebration of W Korea's 10th anniversary	
2020	More Than Family	To-il		
2021	Sweet & Sour	Bo-young	Netflix film	
2023	Cobweb	Han Yu-rim		
2025	Audition 109	Min-hee		
TBA	Unexpected Love †	Fei Yan	Chinese film	

=== Television series ===
Year	Title	Role	Notes	Ref.
2010	More Charming By The Day	Jung Soo-jung		
2011	Welcome to the Show	Herself	Cameo	
2011	High Kick: Revenge of the Short Legged	Ahn Soo-jung		
2013	The Heirs	Lee Bo-na		
2014	Potato Star 2013QR3	Jung Soo-jung	Cameo (Episode 81)	
2014	My Lovely Girl	Yoon Se-na		
2016	The Legend of the Blue Sea	Min-ji	Cameo (Episode 1)	
2017	The Bride of Habaek	Moo-ra / Hye-ra		
2017	Prison Playbook	Kim Ji-ho		
2018	Player	Cha Ah-ryung		
2020	Search	Son Ye-rim		
2021	Police University	Oh Kang-hee		
2022	Crazy Love	Lee Shin-ah		
2024	The Player 2: Master of Swindlers	Cha Ah-ryung	Cameo (Episode 1)	
2025	Way Back Love	Senior grim reaper	Cameo (Episode 5)	
2026	Mad Concrete Dreams	Jeon Yi-kyung		

=== Web series ===
Year	Title	Role	Notes	Ref.
TBA	Graduation Season	Ye Ran	Chinese drama	

=== Television shows ===
Year	Title	Role	Notes	Ref.
2011	Kim Yuna's Kiss & Cry	Contestant	Winner of K & C	
2014	Jessica & Krystal	Cast member		
2021	Jessica & Krystal: US Road Trip	Cast member		

=== Music video appearances ===
Year	Title	Artist	Notes	Ref.
2000	"Wedding March"	Shinhwa		
2006	"I Still Believe"	Rain	BMW Meets Truth project	
2008	"Juliette"	Shinee		
2010	"Sweet Dream"	Alex Chu	Melody Project Part I – Andante	
2010	"Melody"	Krystal	Melody Project Part II – Moderato	
2010	"Spring Will Probably Come"	Byul	Melody Project Part III – Fermata	

== Accolades ==
=== Awards and nominations ===
Name of the award ceremony, year presented, category, nominee of the award, and the result of the nomination
Award	Year	Category	Nominee / work	Result	Ref.
Baeksang Arts Awards	2015	Most Popular Actress (TV)	My Lovely Girl	Won	
Baeksang Arts Awards	2021	Best New Actress – Film	More Than Family	Nominated	
Baeksang Arts Awards	2024	Best Supporting Actress – Film	Cobweb	Nominated	
Blue Dragon Film Awards	2021	Best New Actress	More Than Family	Nominated	
Blue Dragon Film Awards	2023	Best Supporting Actress	Cobweb	Nominated	
Buil Film Awards	2024	Best New Actress	Cobweb	Won	
Chunsa Film Art Awards	2021	Best New Actress	More Than Family	Nominated	
Chunsa Film Art Awards	2023	Best Supporting Actress	Cobweb	Won	
DramaFever Awards	2014	Best Couple	Krystal Jung (with Kang Min-hyuk); The Heirs	Won	
Fashionista Awards	2015	Best Fashionista	Krystal Jung	Won	
Fashionista Awards	2016	Best Fashionista	Krystal Jung	Won	
Fashionista Awards	2017	Best Fashionista – TV & Film Division	The Bride of Habaek	Won	
Golden Cinematography Awards	2021	Popularity Award by Cinematographer	More Than Family	Won	
Grand Bell Awards	2023	Best Supporting Actress	Cobweb	Nominated	
InStyle Star Icon	2016	Most Stylish Female Idol	Krystal Jung	Won	
Jumei Award Ceremony	2016	Fashion Icon Goddess Award	Krystal Jung	Won	
KBS Drama Awards	2021	Best New Actress	Police University	Won	
KBS Drama Awards	2022	Excellence Award, Actress in a Miniseries	Crazy Love	Nominated	
KBS Drama Awards	2022	Popularity Award, Actress	Crazy Love	Won	
Korea Fashion Photographers Association	2016	Celebrity of the Year – Photogenic	Krystal Jung	Won	
MBC Entertainment Awards	2010	Best Newcomer in a Sitcom or Comedy	More Charming By The Day	Won	
Madame Figaro Fashion Gala Awards	2019	Asia Style Award	Krystal Jung	Won	
SBS Drama Awards	2014	Excellence Award, Actress in a Miniseries	My Lovely Girl	Nominated	
Seoul International Youth Film Festival	2014	Best Young Actress	The Heirs	Nominated	
Style Icon Awards	2014	Top 10 Style Icons	Krystal Jung (with Jessica Jung); Jessica & Krystal	Nominated	

=== Listicles ===
Name of publisher, year listed, name of listicle, and placement
Publisher	Year	Listicle	Placement	Ref.
Cine21	2020	New Actress that will lead Korean Video Content Industry in 2021	5th (Note: Tied with Go Min-si, Kim Da-mi, Kim Se-jeong, Park Gyu-young, and Park Hye-su)	
Cine21	2024	"Korean Film NEXT 50" – Actors	Included	
Korean Film Council	2021	Korean Actors 200 (Note: Introduces 200 actors that best represent the present and future of Korean cinema to the people in the film industry all over the world.)	Included	
