= Shin Jae-hwi =

South Korean actor (born 1994)

- Born: February 17, 1994 (age 32); South Korea
- Other name: Sin Jae-hwi
- Education: Korea National University of Arts
- Occupation: Actor
- Years active: 2016–present
- Agent: Saram Entertainment
- Known for: Class of Lies; Nobody Knows; All of Us Are Dead

Shin Jae-hwi is a South Korean actor. He is known for his roles in dramas such as Class of Lies, The Good Detective, XX, Nobody Knows, True Beauty and All of Us Are Dead. He also appeared in movie More Than Family as Jang Do-hoon.

== Filmography ==
=== Film ===
| Year | Title | | Role | Ref. |
| Year | English | Korean | Role | Ref. |
|---|---|---|---|---|
| 2020 | More Than Family | 애비규환 | Jang Ho-hoon | |
| 2020 | Tasty Ending | 맛있는 엔딩 | Sang-hyuk | |
| 2021 | Tasty Ending 2 | 맛있는 영화 2 | Sang-hyuk | |
| 2021 | The Girl on a Bulldozer | 불도저에 탄 소녀 | Student | |
| 2022 | In Our Prime | 이상한 나라의 수학자 | Ji-woo's friend | |
| 2022 | Honest Candidate 2 | 정직한 후보 2 | Go Geon-shik | |
| 2023 | Strong Underdog | 셔틀, 최강의 셔틀 | Jong-bin | |
| 2025 | Dark Nuns | 검은 수녀들 | Ae-dong | |

=== Television series ===
| Year | Title | Role | Ref. |
|---|---|---|---|
| 2017 | 3 AM Season 2 | Si-hyuk | |
| 2019 | Class of Lies | Son Joon-jae | |
| 2020 | XX | Seo Tae-hyun | |
| 2020 | Nobody Knows | Oh Doo-seok | |
| 2020 | The Good Detective | Park Hong-doo | |
| 2020 | Awaken | Lee Tae-soo | |
| 2020 | True Beauty | Lee Sung-yong | |
| 2020 | Half-Fifty | All-K | |
| 2022 | All of Us Are Dead | Park Chang-hoon | |
| 2022 | Juvenile Justice | Seo-bum | |
| 2022 | Link | Lee Jin-geun | |
| 2023 | Duty After School | Corporal Park | |
| 2023 | Tell Me That You Love Me | Jung Mo-dam | |
| 2025 | One: High School Heroes | | |

=== Web series ===
| Year | Title | Role | Ref. |
|---|---|---|---|
| 2022 | Bargain | Chang-soon | |
| 2023 | Moving | Bang Ki-soo | |
| 2023 | Strong Underdog | Jong-bin | |

=== Music video appearances ===
| Year | Title | Artist | Length | Ref. |
|---|---|---|---|---|
| 2020 | I'd like it | Jo Yeonho | 4:10 | |
| 2022 | Are you beautiful or not | Kim Yong-jun | 3:00 | |

== Theatre ==
| Year | Title | Korean Title | Role | Ref. |
|---|---|---|---|---|
| 2016 | Legendary Little Basketball Team | 전설의 리틀 농구단 | Ji-hoon | |
| 2018 | Iron Mask | 아이언 마스크 | Mask member | |
