= Love Options =

2013 single by Bestie

Single by Bestie

from the EP Hot Baby
- Language: Korean
- Released: October 17, 2013
- Genre: K-pop; dance-pop
- Length: 3:14
- Label: YNB
- Composer: Brave Brothers
- Lyricists: Brave Brothers; Chakun
- Producers: Brave Brothers; Star Wars (Galactika)

Bestie singles chronology
"Pitapat" (2013)	"Love Options" (2013)	"Zzang Christmas" (2013)

Music video
- "Love Options" (Official YouTube) on YouTube "Love Options" (1thek) on YouTube

"Love Options" (Korean: 연애의 조건; RR: Yeonaeui jogeon) is a song recorded by South Korean girl group Bestie. It was released by YNB Entertainment on October 17, 2013 as the group's second single and was later included on their first extended play, Hot Baby. The song experienced a resurgence in popularity in 2026 after going viral in short-form challenges on platforms including TikTok, Instagram Reels, and YouTube Shorts.

== Background and release ==
On October 4, 2013, YNB announced that Bestie would be releasing a new song, produced by Brave Brothers, on the 17th. Teaser photos featuring the members were released on the 14th. The single and its accompanying music video was released on October 17 and the group held their first performance for the song on M Countdown later that same day.

In late July 2026, a fan uploaded a short-form video that paired "Love Options" with footage of Hearts2Hearts performing "Lemon Tang" on the music program Music Bank earlier that month. The video went viral after people noticed the group's choreography matched the song, which led to similar edits featuring performances by Hearts2Hearts and other K-pop acts on short-form platforms such as TikTok, Instagram Reels, and YouTube Shorts. The trend gained further traction when groups such as Zerobaseone, STAYC, and Rescene joined the challenge, performing the song's choreography and sharing them on social media. On September 20, the song peaked at number two on YouTube Korea's Daily Top Songs on Shorts chart and at number 11 on the weekly chart. The trend eventually led to Bestie announcing their reunion on October 17, 2026, 13 years after the single's release and 8 years after their disbandment. A new choreography video for the song was released on October 29, ahead of the group's performance on MBC's Show! Music Core on October 31, marking their first music show performance in 11 years.

== Composition ==
"Love Options" was composed by Brave Brothers, written by Brave Brothers and Chakun, and co-arranged by Star Wars (Galactika). Lyrically, the song talks about a woman's struggle to find their ideal partner due to their high standards. Compared to their debut single "Pitapat" which featured an addictive hook, "Love Options" focuses more on the melody, making it an easy and comfortable listening experience.

== Commercial performance ==
"Love Options" debuted at number 113 on the Gaon Digital Chart (currently known as the Circle Digital Chart) for the week ending October 19, 2013. The song fell to number 119 the following week. The song placed at number 186 and sold 56,557 digital copies for the month of October 2013. Following its resurgence, "Love Options" appeared at number 159 on the Circle Download Chart for the week ending September 5, 2026 before re-entering the Digital Chart at number 157 for the week ending September 19. The song eventually rose to its newest peak at number 10 for the week ending November 14, making it their highest charting song on the chart to date.

In Japan, "Love Options" debuted at number 2 on the Billboard Japan Heatseekers Songs in the chart issue dated October 21, 2026 before peaking at number 1 for the chart issue dated November 11, 2026. The song later debuted at number 69 on the Billboard Japan Hot 100 in the chart issue dated November 11, 2026. On the Oricon Combined Singles Chart, the song debuted at number 93 in the chart issue dated November 16, 2026. Additionally, the song peaked at number 1 on the Billboard Taiwan Songs in the chart issue dated November 21, 2026, and debuted at number 145 on Billboard Global 200 in the chart issue dated November 21, 2026.

== Credits and personnel ==
Credits adapted from the EP's liner notes.

Studio

- Brave Studio – recording
- W Studio – mixing
- Sonic Korea – mastering

Personnel

- Tiger Bang – producer
- Bestie – vocals
- Brave Brothers – producer, lyrics, composition, arrangement, background vocals
- Chakun – lyrics, background vocals
- Star Wars (Galactika) – producer, arrangement
- Kim Hyo-soo – background vocals
- Eom Se-hee – recording
- Jo Joon-sung – mixing
- Jeon Hoon – mastering

== Charts ==
=== Weekly charts ===
2013 weekly chart performance for "Love Options"
Chart (2013)	Peak position
South Korea (Gaon)	113

2026 weekly chart performance for "Love Options"
Chart (2026)	Peak position
Global 200 (Billboard)	145
Hong Kong (Billboard)	10
Japan Combined Singles (Oricon)	69
Japan Hot 100 (Billboard Japan)	43
Singapore (RIAS)	15
South Korea (Circle)	10
Taiwan (Billboard)	1
Vietnam Hot 100 (Billboard)	85

=== Monthly charts ===
2013 monthly chart performance for "Love Options"
Chart (2013)	Position
South Korea (Gaon)	186

2026 monthly chart performance for "Love Options"
Chart (2026)	Position
South Korea (Circle)	63
