= Judge vs. Judge =

2017 South Korean TV series

- Promotional poster
- Also known as: Nothing to Lose
- Hangul: 이판, 사판
- Hanja: 理判, 事判
- Lit.: Judge Lee, Judge Sa
- RR: Ipan, Sapan
- MR: Ip'an, Sap'an
- Genre: Legal drama
- Created by: Park Young-soo (SBS)
- Written by: Seo In
- Directed by: Lee Kwang-young
- Starring: Park Eun-bin; Yeon Woo-jin; Dong Ha; Na Hae-ryung
- Country of origin: South Korea
- Original language: Korean
- No. of episodes: 32

Production
- Executive producers: Han Joo-suk; Kim Il-hyun
- Producer: Lee Hee-soo
- Camera setup: Single-camera
- Running time: 35 minutes
- Production companies: CT E&C

Original release
- Network: SBS TV
- Release: November 22, 2017 – January 11, 2018

Judge vs. Judge (Korean: 이판, 사판) is a 2017 South Korean television series starring Park Eun-bin, Yeon Woo-jin, Dong Ha and Na Hae-ryung. It aired on SBS TV from November 22, 2017 to January 11, 2018, every Wednesday and Thursday at 22:00 (KST) for 32 episodes.

== Synopsis ==
The series tell the story of a fiery judge, Lee Jung-joo (Park Eun-bin), who fights to prove the innocence of her older brother, framed for rape and murder and killed while trying to acquit himself.

== Cast ==
=== Main ===
- Park Eun-bin as Lee Jung-joo/Choi Jung-joo, a hot-tempered judge who is incapable of holding her emotions to vent shameless defendants with unspeakable words. She presides at the Seoul District Court.
- Yeon Woo-jin as Sa Eui-hyeon, a righteous independent judge who is excellent in his use of law and ethics to reach judgement. He is assigned to the same division as Lee Jung-joo.
- Dong Ha as Do Han-joon, a prosecutor who graduated with Sa Eui-hyeon at the top of his class.
- Na Hae-ryung as Jin Se-ra, an intelligent third generation chaebol who is a law school student and a former idol singer.

=== Supporting ===
==== People at Korea University Law School ====
- Heo Joon-seok as Ha Young-hoon, a former prison guard and law school student who is responsible for creating the misjudgment research team.
- Jung Yoo-min as Hwang Min-ah, a former Blue House bodyguard and current law school student.
- Hong Seung-beom as Nam Yoon-il
- Jung Yeon-joo as Lee Seon-hwa, a single mother who is a member of the misjudgment researching team.

==== People at court ====
- Lee Moon-sik as Oh Ji-rak, a chief prosecuting attorney.
- Lee Chang-wook as Jeong Chae-sung
- Woo Hyun as Choi Go-soo
- Bae Hae-sun as Moon Yoo-seon
- Cho Jae-ryong as Song Ho-chan
- Kim Min-sang as Seo Dae-su
- Lee Hye-eun as Oh Mi-ja
- Heo Jung-gyu as Kim Moo-sik
- Kim Jin-yeop as Lee Cha-won
- Oh Na-ra as Judge Yoon

=== Extended ===
- Kim Hae-sook as Yoo Myung-hee, a professor in law school. She inspired Lee Jung-joo to become a judge.
- Lee Deok-hwa as Do Jin-myung
- Choi Jung-woo as Sa Jeong-do
- Park Ji-a as Jang Soon-bok
- Seo Cho-won as Supporting
- Ji Seung-hyun as Choi Kyung-ho, Lee Jung-joo's older brother
- Kim Hee-jung as Eom Sin-sook, Lee Jung-joo's mother and a janitor at the courthouse.

== Production ==
The first script reading of the cast was held on October 23, 2017 at SBS Ilsan Production Center.

== Ratings ==
Ep.	Original broadcast date	Average audience share			
Ep.	Original broadcast date	TNmS		Nielsen Korea	
Ep.	Original broadcast date	Nationwide	Seoul	Nationwide	Seoul
1	November 22, 2017	6.7% (19th)	6.9% (17th)	6.9% (18th)	7.8% (11th)
2	November 22, 2017	7.3% (15th)	7.9% (12th)	8.0% (10th)	8.9% (6th)
3	November 23, 2017	7.5% (16th)	8.0% (12th)	7.2% (19th)	7.7% (15th)
4	November 23, 2017	7.2% (18th)	8.5% (9th)	7.6% (16th)	8.6% (8th)
5	November 29, 2017	5.7% (20th)	6.2% (NR)	6.0% (19th)	6.5% (19th)
6	November 29, 2017	6.0% (19th)	6.5% (15th)	7.5% (13th)	8.5% (7th)
7	November 30, 2017	6.0% (NR)	7.2% (16th)	6.7% (18th)	8.0% (13th)
8	November 30, 2017	6.0% (NR)	6.2% (19th)	6.6% (20th)	7.8% (14th)
9	December 6, 2017	6.1% (NR)	6.5% (20th)	6.6% (17th)	6.9% (17th)
10	December 6, 2017	6.6% (20th)	6.8% (16th)	7.3% (14th)	7.5% (10th)
11	December 7, 2017	6.6% (NR)	6.3% (20th)	7.1% (17th)	8.2% (11th)
12	December 7, 2017	6.9% (19th)	7.0% (18th)	8.2% (12th)	9.1% (7th)
13	December 13, 2017	5.2% (NR)	6.3% (NR)	6.4% (NR)	7.5% (15th)
14	December 13, 2017	5.9% (NR)	7.1% (NR)	7.9% (11th)	9.0% (5th)
15	December 14, 2017	5.6% (NR)	6.4% (20th)	6.6% (18th)	7.6% (15th)
16	December 14, 2017	6.0% (NR)	6.6% (18th)	8.1% (14th)	9.2% (6th)
17	December 20, 2017	4.4% (NR)	5.8% (NR)	6.8% (18th)	8.2% (12th)
18	December 20, 2017	5.1% (NR)	6.3% (NR)	7.4% (17th)	8.6% (10th)
19	December 21, 2017	5.6% (19th)	6.1% (17th)	5.8% (NR)	6.5% (16th)
20	December 21, 2017	5.9% (18th)	6.6% (13th)	7.1% (13th)	7.9% (11th)
21	December 27, 2017	5.1% (NR)	5.9% (NR)	6.0% (NR)	6.8% (17th)
22	December 27, 2017	5.6% (NR)	6.3% (19th)	7.1% (15th)	8.3% (8th)
23	December 28, 2017	5.3% (NR)	6.5% (NR)	7.6% (15th)	8.9% (10th)
24	December 28, 2017	5.4% (NR)	6.7% (NR)	7.9% (12th)	9.2% (8th)
25	January 3, 2018	5.8% (NR)	6.4% (17th)	6.3% (NR)	7.1% (16th)
26	January 3, 2018	6.3% (NR)	6.9% (15th)	7.3% (14th)	8.2% (11th)
27	January 4, 2018	6.0%	6.5%	6.4% (19th)	6.8% (19th)
28	January 4, 2018	5.7%	6.4%	6.8% (17th)	7.5% (15th)
29	January 10, 2018	5.7%	6.2%	6.5% (17th)	7.0% (15th)
30	January 10, 2018	5.8%	6.5%	7.6% (13th)	8.4% (10th)
31	January 11, 2018	6.3%	6.5%	7.1% (18th)	7.3% (17th)
32	January 11, 2018	6.5%	7.2%	8.0% (13th)	8.7% (11th)
Average		5.9%	6.6%	7.0%	7.9%
In the table above, the blue numbers represent the lowest ratings and the red numbers represent the highest ratings.; NR denotes that the series did not rank in the top 20 daily programs on that date.

== Awards and nominations ==
Year	Award	Category	Nominee	Result
2017	25th SBS Drama Awards	Top Excellence Award, Actor in a Wednesday–Thursday Drama	Yeon Woo-jin	Nominated
2017	25th SBS Drama Awards	Excellence Award, Actress in a Wednesday–Thursday Drama	Park Eun-bin	Nominated
2017	25th SBS Drama Awards	Excellence Award, Actor in a Wednesday–Thursday Drama	Dong Ha	Nominated
2017	25th SBS Drama Awards	Best New Actor	Dong Ha	Nominated
