= My Mind's Flower Rain =

South Korean television series

- Promotional poster
- Also known as: Flowers in My Heart
- Hangul: 내 마음의 꽃비
- RR: Nae maeumui kkotbi
- MR: Nae maŭmŭi kkotpi
- Genre: Period drama; Romance; Family; Melodrama; Revenge
- Written by: Han Hee-jung (Episode 1-40); Moon Young-hoon
- Directed by: Eo Soo-sun
- Creative director: Hong Eun-mi
- Starring: Na Hae-ryung; Lee Chang-wook; Jung Yi-yeon; Ji Eun-sung
- Country of origin: South Korea
- Original language: Korean
- No. of episodes: 128

Production
- Executive producer: Choi Ji-young
- Producer: Choi Yoon-seok
- Running time: 40 min
- Production company: KBS Drama Production

Original release
- Network: KBS2
- Release: February 29 – September 6, 2016

My Mind's Flower Rain (Korean: 내 마음의 꽃비) is a 2016 South Korea morning soap opera starring Na Hae-ryung, Lee Chang-wook, Jung Yi-yeon, and Ji Eun-sung. It aired on KBS2 from February 29, 2016 on Mondays to Fridays at 09:00 (KST) to 09:45 (KST).

It is the 40th TV Novel series (9th in 2010s) of KBS.

== Summary ==
A story of a bright young girl who lost her family during the Korean War and grew up experiencing the rapid change of Korean society in the 1970s.

== Cast ==
=== Main ===
- Na Hae-ryung as Jung Kkot-nim / Min Sun-ah
- Lee Chang-wook as Lee Kang-wook
  - Park Sang-hoon as young Lee Kang-wook
- Jung Yi-yeon as Min Hye-joo
- Ji Eun-sung as Park Sun-ho

=== Supporting ===
==== People around Kkot-nim (Adopted) ====
- Hong Sung-deok as Jung Ji-taek
- Baek Hyun-joo as Oh Choon-shim
- Kee Bum-kyoo as Jung Do-chul
- Kim Do-yeon as Jung Ki-soon

==== People around Sun-ho ====
- Kim Myung-soo as Park Min-kyoo
- Choi Wan-jung as Lee Young-im

==== People around Hye-joo ====
- Im Ji-eun as Jun Il-ran (Fake Seo Yeon-hee)
- Lee Joo-shil as Kim Jye-ok
- Min Bok-ki as Min Deok-soo
- Jo Ye-rin as Nub Young-ji
