= Hot Baby =

- Clockwise from top right: Uji, Haeryung, Hyoyeon and Dahye.

EP by Bestie
- Released: July 28, 2014
- Genre: K-pop
- Length: 24:36
- Language: Korean
- Labels: YNB Entertainment; Loen Entertainment
- Producer: Tiger Bang

Bestie chronology
Hot Baby (2014)	Love Emotion (2015)

Singles from Hot Baby
- 1. "Love Options" Released: October 17, 2013; 2. "Thank U Very Much" Released: February 28, 2014; 3. "Like a Star" Released: July 11, 2014; 4. "Hot Baby" Released: July 28, 2014; 5. "I Need You" Released: August 29, 2014

Alternative cover
- Cover for I Need You digital repackage

Hot Baby is a mini-album by South Korean girl group BESTie. It was released on July 28, 2014 by YNB Entertainment and distributed by Loen Entertainment as the group's first mini-album. On August 29, it was re-released as I Need You (Korean: 니가 필요해; RR: Niga Piryohae).

== Background ==
=== "Pitapat" ===
"Pitapat" (Korean: 두근 두근; RR: Dugeun Dugeun) was released on July 12, 2013 as Bestie's debut single. It was composed by Super Changddai with production by Will Simms and Tom Havelock. The song's music video, which features comedian Yoo Se-yoon and 2AM's Jo Kwon, has been noted for its "fanservice shots" and "flirty" choreography. Corynn Smith of MTV K gave the track a positive review, calling it "ear-worm-y" and highlighted its production team.

In South Korea, "Pitapat" debuted at number 126 on the Gaon Digital Chart for the week of July 7 to July 13, 2013, with 18,220 copies sold. The next week, the single jumped to its peak position of number 84. "Pitapat" charted for a total of four weeks, selling 42,588 digital downloads in the month of July.

A remix of "Pitapat" was included on Bestie's debut mini-album, Hot Baby.

=== "Thank U Very Much" and other digital singles ===
"연애의 조건" ("Love Options") was released as a second digital single on October 17, 2013, followed by "Thank U Very Much" on February 28, 2014. The song was written and produced by Duble Sidekick, with additional arrangement by Radio Galaxi. The single debuted at number 118 on the Gaon Digital Chart, selling 19,116 copies in its first week. On the Billboard Korea K-pop Hot 100, it debuted at position 74 on the issue dated March 5, 2014.

"별처럼" ("Like a Star"; Byeolcheoreom) was released as a digital single on July 11, 2014.

=== Hot Baby and repackage ===
The Hot Baby mini-album was released on July 28, 2014, along with its title track. In addition to the title track and two other new songs, the EP included the previously released digital singles "Love Options", "Thank U Very Much" and "Like a Star", along with a remix of "Pitapat".

A digital-only repackaged version of the mini-album entitled I Need You was released on August 29, 2014 with a new track produced by Duble Sidekick and Homeboy. The title track served as the promotional single for the new version.

== Track listing ==
No.	Title	Lyrics	Music	Arrangement	Length
1.	"Hot Baby"	Duble Sidekick	Duble Sidekick, Kim Hyun-ah	Duble Sidekick	3:25
2.	"Like a Star" (별처럼; Byeolcheoreom)	Hong Ji-sang, Lee Woo-min	Hong Ji-sang, Lee Woo-min	Hong Ji-sang, Lee Woo-min	4:14
3.	"Roller Girl" (롤러걸; Lolleogeol)	Duble Sidekick, David Kim	Duble Sidekick, Park Cham, Kim Hyun-ah, Kim So-ri	Duble Sidekick	3:38
4.	"I'm So Into You"	Hong Ji-sang	Hong Ji-sang	Hong Ji-sang	3:51
5.	"Thank U Very Much"	Duble Sidekick	Duble Sidekick, Kim Hyun-ah, Kim So-ri, Park Cham	Radio Galaxy	3:12
6.	"Love Options" (연애의 조건; Yeonaeui Jogeon)	Brave Brothers, Chakun	Brave Brothers	Brave Brothers, Star Wars (Galactika)	3:12
7.	"Pitapat" (두근 두근; Doogeun Doogeun) (Remix)	Kim Eun-su, Minigun	Super Changddai, Will Simms, Tom Havelock, UJi	Super Changddai	3:04
Total length:					24:36

=== Digital repackage ===
Track listing
No.	Title	Lyrics	Music	Arrangement	Length
1.	"I Need You" (니가 필요해; Niga Piryohae)	Duble Sidekick	Duble Sidekick, Homeboy	Glory Face, Homeboy	3:01
2.	"Hot Baby"	Duble Sidekick	Duble Sidekick, Kim Hyun-ah	Duble Sidekick	3:25
3.	"Like a Star" (별처럼; Byeolcheoreom)	Hong Ji-sang, Lee Woo-min	Hong Ji-sang, Lee Woo-min	Hong Ji-sang, Lee Woo-min	4:14
4.	"Roller Girl" (롤러걸; Lolleogeol)	Duble Sidekick, David Kim	Duble Sidekick, Park Cham, Kim Hyun-ah, Kim So-ri	Duble Sidekick	3:38
5.	"I'm So Into You"	Hong Ji-sang	Hong Ji-sang	Hong Ji-sang	3:51
6.	"Thank U Very Much"	Duble Sidekick	Duble Sidekick, Kim Hyun-ah, Kim So-ri, Park Cham	Radio Galaxy	3:12
7.	"Love Options" (연애의 조건; Yeonaeui Jogeon)	Brave Brothers	Brave Brothers, Kim Hyo-su, Chakun	Brave Brothers, Galactika	3:12
8.	"Pitapat" (두근 두근; Doogeun Doogeun) (Remix)	Kim Eun-su, Minigun	Super Changddai, Will Simms, Tom Havelock, UJi]	Super Changddai	3:04
9.	"I Need You" (니가 필요해; Niga Piryohae) (Instrumental)	Duble Sidekick	Duble Sidekick, Homeboy	Glory Face, Homeboy	3:01
Total length:					30:38

== Charts ==
Chart performance for Hot Baby
Chart (2026)	Peak position
Japanese Hot Albums (Billboard Japan)	76
