= Na Hae-ryung =

South Korean actress (born 1994)

- 나해령
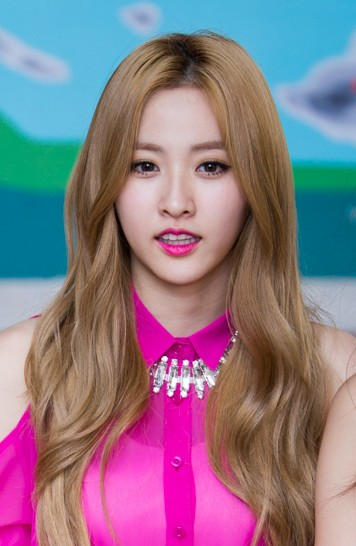
- Na in June 2015
- Born: November 11, 1994 (age 32); Bucheon, South Korea
- Other name: Handara
- Occupations: Actress; singer
- Years active: 2003–present
- Agent: OSR Entertainment
- Musical career
- Genre: K-pop
- Instrument: Vocals
- Years active: 2012–2018; 2026–present
- Labels: AB; YNB
- Member of: Bestie
- Formerly of: EXID

Korean name
- Hangul: 나해령
- Hanja: 羅海嶺
- RR: Na Haeryeong
- MR: Na Haeryŏng

Na Hae-ryung (Note: Alternatively romanized as Na Hae-ryeong.) (Korean: 나해령, born November 11, 1994), better known mononymously as Haeryung, (Note: Alternatively romanized as Haeryeong.) is a South Korean actress and former singer. She is a member of Bestie and a former member of the girl group EXID.

== Career ==
Na Hae-ryung was a child actress and appeared in film and television roles, such as in the drama Magic Kid Masuri.

She was a member of girl group EXID for two months in 2012, during which time she featured on their debut single album Holla. She left the group in April 2012 to focus on her education. In 2013, she signed with YNB Entertainment and debuted as a member of the band Bestie, which debuted in July 2013 until disbandment in 2018 and reformed in October 2026.

She later appeared in supporting roles in dramas including Hi! School: Love On, My Lovely Girl, and The Producers. Her first lead television role came in 2016 as Jung Kkot-nim in the KBS drama My Mind's Flower Rain. She appeared as Jin Se-ra in the 2017 SBS drama Nothing to Lose.

In 2023, Na returned to acting after 4 years under the stage name Han Da-ra and made a special appearance in The Escape of the Seven playing the role of Hong Sa-ra.

== Filmography ==
=== Film ===
Year	Title	Role	Notes	Ref.
2003	Once Upon a Time in a Battlefield	Kaebaek's older daughter		
2004	To Catch a Virgin Ghost	Childcare graduate student		
2010	Nice Shorts	Girl	segment "Girl"	

=== Television series ===
Year	Title	Role	Notes	Ref.
2001	Dancing Girl Wawa			
2002	School Story			
2002	Magic Kid Masuri			
2003	Sharp 1			
2004	April Kiss			
2013	Nine	Han So-ra		
2014	KBS Drama Special: "Oh Man-bok is Pretty"	Oh Soon-bok	One act-drama	
2014	Love and War 2: My Wife is the Boss	Chae-hee		
2014	Hi! School: Love On	Lee Ye-na		
2014	My Lovely Girl	Yoo Ra-eum		
2015	The Lover		Cameo, episode 6	
2015	The Producers	Yoo-na	Special appearance	
2015	Mom	Joo-hee		
2016	My Mind's Flower Rain	Jung Kkot-nim		
2017	Three Color Fantasy: "The Universe's Star"	Dr. Yoon So-ri		
2017	Judge vs. Judge	Jin Se-ra		
2019	Clean with Passion for Now	Kim Hye-won	Special appearance	
2023	The Escape of the Seven	Hong Sa-ra	Credited as Han Da-ra; Special appearance	

=== Web series ===
Year	Title	Role	Ref.
2015	Love Ward No. 25	Na Sa-rang	
2015	9 Seconds - Eternal Time	Yoo So-ra	

=== Television shows ===
Year	Title	Role	Notes	Ref.
2013	Comedy Big League	MC		
2015	Law of the Jungle - Samoa	Cast member	Episodes 191–194	
