= List of awards and nominations received by 2NE1 =

2NE1 awards and nominations
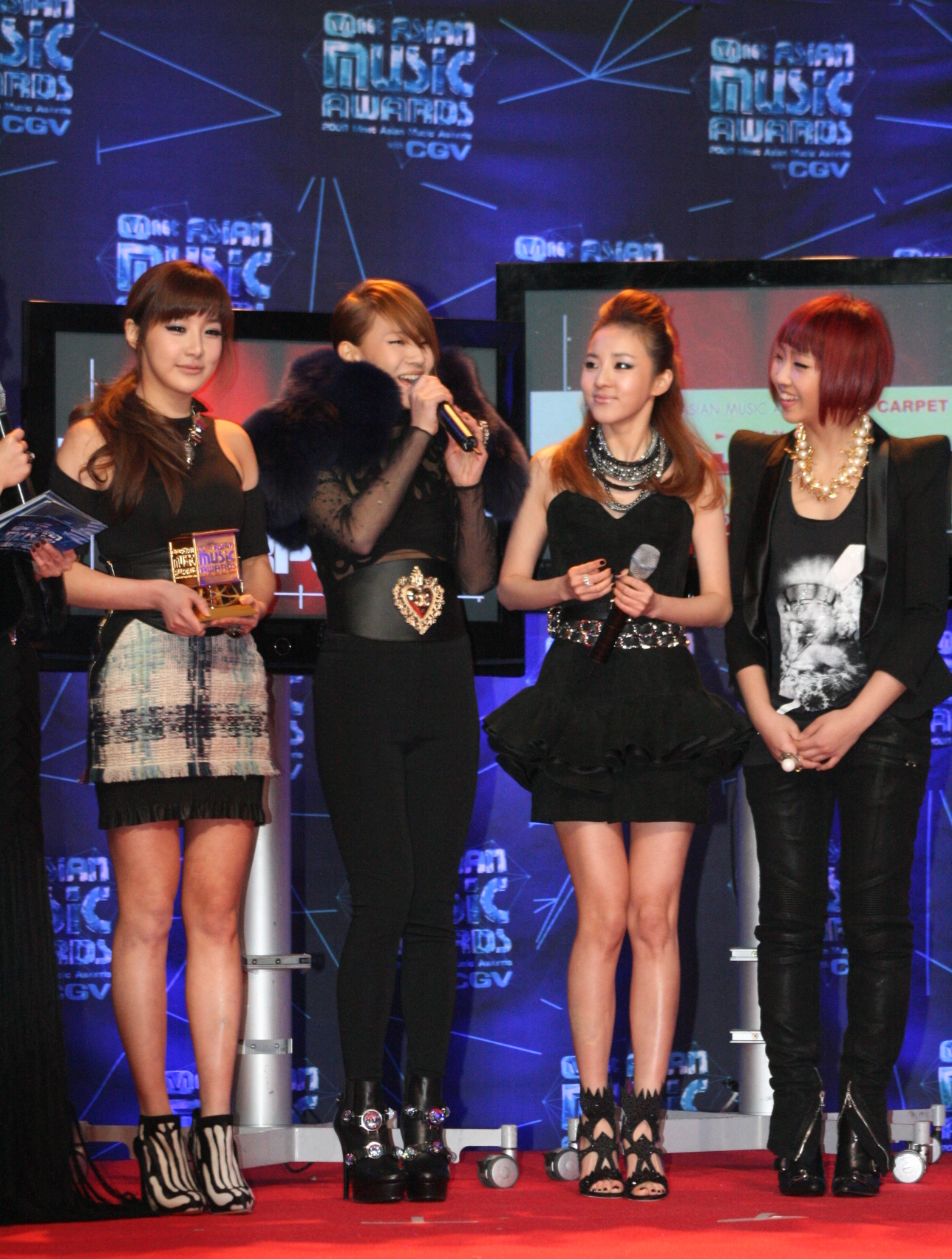
- 2NE1 at the 2009 Mnet Asian Music Awards
Awards and nominations
Award	Wins	Nominations
Asia Song Festival	1	1
Bugs Music Awards	1	6
China Music Awards	0	1
Cyworld Digital Music Awards	11	11
Gaon Chart Music Awards	4	4
Golden Disc Awards	2	12
GQ Awards	3	3
Japan Record Awards	1	2
Korean Music Awards	2	6
Korean Popular Culture and Arts Awards	1	1
MAMA Awards	9	22
Melon Music Awards	10	25
Mnet 20's Choice Awards	3	6
MTV Daum Music Fest	1	1
MTV Iggy	3	4
MTV Italian Music Awards	0	1
MTV Video Music Awards Japan	1	1
Myx Music Awards	2	5
Nate Awards	0	1
O Music Awards	0	1
Philippine K-pop Awards	6	6
Red Dot	1	1
Rhythmer Awards	2	4
SBS Awards Festival	2	2
SBS MTV Best of the Best	1	6
Seoul Music Awards	1	4
Singapore E-Awards	0	1
So-Loved Awards	6	6
Soompi Awards	2	2
Space Shower Music Video Awards	0	1
Style Icon Awards	2	4
Teen Choice Awards	0	1
World Music Awards	0	3
Yahoo! Asian Buzz Awards	0	2
YinYueTai V-Chart Awards	1	1
You2Play Awards	0	2
YouTube Music Awards	1	1

Totals (Note: Certain award groups do not simply award one winner. They acknowledge several different recipients, have runners-up, and have third place. Since this is a specific recognition and is different from losing an award, runner-up mentions are considered wins in this award tally. For simplification and to avoid errors, each award in this list has been presumed to have had a prior nomination.)
- Wins: 90
- Nominations: 173

South Korean girl group 2NE1 have received numerous of awards and honors. When the group debuted, "Fire" (2009) received the Cyworld Song of the Month while 2NE1 was named the Rookie of the Month in May 2009. At the 2009 Mnet Asian Music Awards, "I Don't Care" won the Song of the Year award, making 2NE1 the first idol group in South Korean history to receive a daesang prize in their debut year. The group received a number of awards at the Cyworld Digital Music Awards, including Top-Selling Artist, Best Rookie Group, Bonsang Award, and Song of the Year (for "I Don't Care"). At the inaugural Melon Music Awards on December 16, 2009, the group was the only new act chosen as one of the top 10 artists in South Korea and received the Best New Artist award. After analyzing its online music charts throughout 2009, Mnet.com music portal named 2NE1 the "Artist of the Year".

For their sophomore studio album To Anyone (2010), 2NE1 won the most awards at the 2010 Mnet Asian Music Awards in Macau, including two daesangs (Artist of the Year and Album of the Year, for To Anyone), Best Music Video for "Can't Nobody", and Best Female Group. They were the first artist to receive all three daesang awards in the history of the Mnet Asian Music Awards. The group received three awards at the second Melon Music Awards in December 2010, including Album of the Year. 2NE1's second EP (2011) received the Album of the Year award at the third Melon Music Awards in 2011, which led them to become the only girl group to receive the award more than once. At the 2011 Mnet Asian Music Awards, the group received the Song of the Year award for "I Am the Best"—the first artists to receive the award multiple times—while "Lonely" won Best Vocal Performance – Group. Following the ceremony, the group received a total of four daesangs (two Songs of the Year, one Album of the Year, and one Artist of the Year), and remains the most by any female act at MAMA.

In November 2012, 2NE1 received the Prime Minister Commendation at Korean Popular Culture and Arts Awards, an honor bestowed in recognition for outstanding public service or excellence in their field. Between 2009 and 2013, 16 of their songs ranked within the top 100 on the annual Melon record charts, making them the act with the fourth-highest number of hit songs in South Korean history according to Star News. In December 2023, the Korea Federation of Copyright Societies included "Come Back Home" as part of its third induction into the Korea World Music Culture Hall of Fame.

== Awards and nominations ==
Name of the award ceremony, year presented, category, nominee of the award, and the result of the nomination
Organization	Year	Category	Nominee / work	Result	Ref.
Allkpop Awards	2010	Best Female Group	2NE1	Won	
Allkpop Awards	2011	Best Female Group	2NE1	Won	
Allkpop Awards	2012	Best Live	2NE1	Won	
Asia Song Festival	2009	Best Asian Newcomer Award	2NE1	Won	
Bugs Music Awards	2009	Girl Group of the Year	2NE1	Nominated	
Bugs Music Awards	2009	Rookie of the Year	2NE1	Nominated	
Bugs Music Awards	2010	Music Video of the Year	"Can't Nobody"	Nominated	
Bugs Music Awards	2010	Girl Group of the Year	2NE1	Nominated	
Bugs Music Awards	2011	Girl Group of the Year	2NE1	Nominated	
Bugs Music Awards	2020	20th Anniversary – Most Loved Music	"I Don't Care"	Won	
China Music Awards	2013	Most Popular International Group	2NE1	Nominated	
Cyworld Digital Music Awards	2009	Song of the Month – April	"Lollipop" (with Big Bang)	Won	
Cyworld Digital Music Awards	2009	Song of the Month – May	"Fire"	Won	
Cyworld Digital Music Awards	2009	Rookie of the Month – May	"Fire"	Won	
Cyworld Digital Music Awards	2009	Song of the Month – July	"I Don't Care"	Won	
Cyworld Digital Music Awards	2009	Bonsang Award (Top 10)	"I Don't Care"	Won	
Cyworld Digital Music Awards	2009	Rookie of the Year – Group	2NE1	Won	
Cyworld Digital Music Awards	2009	Artist of the Year	2NE1	Won	
Cyworld Digital Music Awards	2009	Top Seller Artist	2NE1	Won	
Cyworld Digital Music Awards	2009	Song of the Year	"I Don't Care"	Won	
Cyworld Digital Music Awards	2010	Song of the Month – September	"Go Away"	Won	
Cyworld Digital Music Awards	2011	Song of the Month – May	"Lonely"	Won	
Dosirak Music Awards	2010	Album of the Year	To Anyone	Won	
Gaon Chart Music Awards	2011	Song of the Year – May	"Lonely"	Won	
Gaon Chart Music Awards	2012	Song of the Year – July	"I Love You"	Won	
Gaon Chart Music Awards	2013	World Hallyu Star Special Award	2NE1	Won	
Gaon Chart Music Awards	2014	Song of the Year – March	"Come Back Home"	Won	
German Korean Entertainment Awards	2011	Best Female Group	2NE1	Won	
German Korean Entertainment Awards	2011	Best Female Dance Performance	"I Am the Best"	Won	
Golden Disc Awards	2009	Rookie Award	2NE1	Nominated	
Golden Disc Awards	2009	Digital Song Bonsang	"Fire"	Nominated	
Golden Disc Awards	2010	Popularity Award	2NE1	Nominated	
Golden Disc Awards	2010	Album Bonsang	To Anyone	Nominated	
Golden Disc Awards	2012	Popularity Award	2NE1	Nominated	
Golden Disc Awards	2012	Digital Song Bonsang	"Lonely"	Nominated	
Golden Disc Awards	2013	Popularity Award	2NE1	Nominated	
Golden Disc Awards	2013	Digital Song Bonsang	"I Love You"	Won	
Golden Disc Awards	2013	Digital Daesang	"I Love You"	Nominated	
Golden Disc Awards	2014	Popularity Award	2NE1	Nominated	
Golden Disc Awards	2014	Digital Song Bonsang	"Missing You"	Won	
Golden Disc Awards	2014	Digital Daesang	"Missing You"	Nominated	
Golden Disc Awards	2015	Album Bonsang	Crush	Nominated	
Golden Disc Awards	2015	Digital Song Bonsang	"Come Back Home"	Nominated	
GQ Awards	2009	This Year's Stage	2NE1	Won	
GQ Awards	2009	This Year's Song	"I Don't Care"	Won	
GQ Awards	2009	This Year's Album	2NE1 1st Mini Album	Won	
Japan Record Awards	2011	New Artist of the Year	2NE1	Won	
Japan Record Awards	2011	Best New Artist Award	2NE1	Nominated	
JKN Korea Star of the Year Awards	2011	Best Female Group	2NE1	Won	
J-pop Asia Music Awards	2012	Best Girl Group	2NE1	Won	
Korea First Brand Awards (Note: Established in 2004, the Korea First Brand Awards is an annual awards ceremony hosted by the Korea Consumer Brand Committee and organized by the Korea Consumer Forum.)	2016	Top 10 Hallyu Stars – China	2NE1	Won	
Korean Music Awards	2010	Rookie of the Year	2NE1	Nominated	
Korean Music Awards	2010	Best R&B & Soul Song	"I Don't Care"	Nominated	
Korean Music Awards	2011	Best Dance & Electronic Album	To Anyone	Won	
Korean Music Awards	2011	Best Dance & Electronic Song	"Can't Nobody"	Nominated	
Korean Music Awards	2012	Best Dance & Electronic Song	"I Am the Best"	Won	
Korean Music Awards	2012	Song of the Year	"I Am the Best"	Nominated	
MAMA Awards	2009	Song of the Year	"I Don't Care"	Won	
MAMA Awards	2009	Best New Female Artist	"I Don't Care"	Won	
MAMA Awards	2009	Best Music Video	"Fire"	Won	
MAMA Awards	2009	Music Portal Mnet Award	2NE1	Won	
MAMA Awards	2009	Best Dance Performance	"I Don't Care"	Nominated	
MAMA Awards	2010	Artist of the Year	2NE1	Won	
MAMA Awards	2010	Best Female Group	2NE1	Won	
MAMA Awards	2010	Album of the Year	To Anyone	Won	
MAMA Awards	2010	Best Music Video	"Can't Nobody"	Won	
MAMA Awards	2010	Song of the Year	"Can't Nobody"	Nominated	
MAMA Awards	2010	Best Dance Performance – Female Group	"Can't Nobody"	Nominated	
MAMA Awards	2011	Song of the Year	"I Am the Best"	Won	
MAMA Awards	2011	Best Vocal Performance Group	"Lonely"	Won	
MAMA Awards	2011	Artist of the Year	2NE1	Nominated	
MAMA Awards	2011	Best Female Group	2NE1	Nominated	
MAMA Awards	2011	Best Dance Performance – Female Group	"I Am the Best"	Nominated	
MAMA Awards	2011	Album of the Year	2NE1 2nd Mini Album	Nominated	
MAMA Awards	2012	Best Female Group	"I Love You"	Nominated	
MAMA Awards	2012	Best Global Group – Female	"I Love You"	Nominated	
MAMA Awards	2013	Artist of the Year	2NE1	Nominated	
MAMA Awards	2013	Best Female Group	"Falling In Love"	Nominated	
MAMA Awards	2014	Best Female Group	"Come Back Home"	Nominated	
MAMA Awards	2014	Artist of the Year	2NE1	Nominated	
Melon Music Awards	2009	Best New Artist	2NE1	Won	
Melon Music Awards	2009	Bonsang Award (Top 10)	2NE1	Won	
Melon Music Awards	2009	Artist of the Year	2NE1	Nominated	
Melon Music Awards	2009	Album of the Year	2NE1 1st Mini Album	Nominated	
Melon Music Awards	2009	Song of the Year	"I Don't Care"	Nominated	
Melon Music Awards	2010	Album of the Year	To Anyone	Won	
Melon Music Awards	2010	Bonsang Award (Top 10)	2NE1	Won	
Melon Music Awards	2010	Song of the Year	"Go Away"	Nominated	
Melon Music Awards	2010	Artist of the Year	2NE1	Nominated	
Melon Music Awards	2010	Best Dressed Singer	2NE1	Nominated	
Melon Music Awards	2010	Hot Trend Song	"Go Away"	Nominated	
Melon Music Awards	2011	Album of the Year	2NE1 2nd Mini Album	Won	
Melon Music Awards	2011	Bonsang Award (Top 10)	2NE1	Won	
Melon Music Awards	2011	Artist of the Year	2NE1	Nominated	
Melon Music Awards	2011	Song of the Year	"I Am the Best"	Nominated	
Melon Music Awards	2011	Popular Netizen Song	"I Am the Best"	Nominated	
Melon Music Awards	2012	Bonsang Award (Top 10)	2NE1	Won	
Melon Music Awards	2012	Global Artist Award	2NE1	Nominated	
Melon Music Awards	2013	Global Artist Award	2NE1	Nominated	
Melon Music Awards	2014	Bonsang Award (Top 10)	2NE1	Won	
Melon Music Awards	2014	Best Electronic Song	"Come Back Home"	Won	
Melon Music Awards	2014	Album of the Year	Crush	Nominated	
Melon Music Awards	2014	Best R&B Song	"If I Were You"	Nominated	
Mnet 20's Choice Awards	2009	Hot New Star	2NE1	Won	
Mnet 20's Choice Awards	2009	Hot Performance	2NE1	Nominated	
Mnet 20's Choice Awards	2009	Hot Summer Popularity	2NE1	Nominated	
Mnet 20's Choice Awards	2009	Hot CF Star	"Lollipop"	Won	
Mnet 20's Choice Awards	2009	Hot Online Song	"Fire"	Won	
Mnet 20's Choice Awards	2009	Hot Girl Group Style	Sunglasses from "I Don't Care"	Nominated	
MTV Daum Music Fest	2011	Artist of the Year	2NE1	Won	
MTV Iggy	2011	Best New Band in the World	2NE1	Won	
MTV Iggy	2013	Song of the Year	"Falling in Love"	Nominated	
MTV Iggy	2013	Song of the Summer	"Falling in Love"	Won	
MTV Iggy	2014	Song of the Year	"Gotta Be You"	Won	
MTV Italian Music Awards	2015	Best Artist from the World	2NE1	Nominated	
MTV Video Music Awards Japan	2012	Best New Artist Video	"I Am the Best"	Won	
Myx Music Awards	2010	Favorite International Video Award	"Fire"	Nominated	
Myx Music Awards	2011	Favorite K-pop Video Award	"Go Away"	Won	
Myx Music Awards	2012	Favorite K-pop Video Award	"Lonely"	Nominated	
Myx Music Awards	2013	Favorite K-pop Video Award	"I Love You"	Nominated	
Myx Music Awards	2015	Favorite K-pop Video Award	"Come Back Home"	Won	
Nate Awards	2014	People's Choice Hallyu Star	2NE1	Nominated	
O Music Awards	2012	Fan Army FTW (Blackjacks)	2NE1	Nominated	
Philippine K-pop Awards	2009	Best New Artist	2NE1	Won	
Philippine K-pop Awards	2010	Best Female Group	2NE1	Won	
Philippine K-pop Awards	2011	Best Female Group	2NE1	Won	
Philippine K-pop Awards	2012	Best Female Group	2NE1	Won	
Philippine K-pop Awards	2014	Best Female Group	2NE1	Won	
Philippine K-pop Awards	2014	Album of the Year	Crush	Won	
Red Dot Design Awards	2015	Communication Design	Crush	Won	
Rhythmer Awards	2009	R&B Artist of the Year	2NE1	Won	
Rhythmer Awards	2009	Rookie of the Year (Domestic)	2NE1	Won	
Rhythmer Awards	2009	R&B Album of the Year	2NE1 1st Mini Album	Nominated	
Rhythmer Awards	2009	R&B Song of the Year	"I Don't Care"	Nominated	
SBS Awards Festival	2014	Top 10 Artists	2NE1	Won	
SBS Awards Festival	2014	Best Female Group	2NE1	Won	
SBS MTV Best of the Best	2011	Artist of the Year	2NE1	Nominated	
SBS MTV Best of the Best	2011	Best Female Group	2NE1	Nominated	
SBS MTV Best of the Best	2011	Best Female Music Video	2NE1	Won	
SBS MTV Best of the Best	2013	Best Female Group	2NE1	Nominated	
SBS MTV Best of the Best	2014	Artist of the Year	2NE1	Nominated	
SBS MTV Best of the Best	2014	Best Female Music Video	"Come Back Home"	Nominated	
Seoul Music Awards	2010	Bonsang (Main Prize)	2NE1	Nominated	
Seoul Music Awards	2010	Popularity Award	2NE1	Nominated	
Seoul Music Awards	2011	Popularity Award	2NE1	Nominated	
Seoul Music Awards	2013	Bonsang (Main Prize)	2NE1	Won	
Singapore E-Awards	2012	Most Popular Korean Artist	2NE1	Nominated	
So-Loved Awards (Note: The So-Loved Awards is an award based in Germany sponsored by the Korea Foundation for International Cultural Exchange (KOFICE).)	2010	Best Female Group	2NE1	Won	
So-Loved Awards	2011	Best Female Group	2NE1	Won	
So-Loved Awards	2012	Best Japanese Song	"Scream"	Won	
So-Loved Awards	2012	Best Female Group	2NE1	Won	
So-Loved Awards	2013	Best Female Group	2NE1	Won	
So-Loved Awards	2014	Best Female Group	2NE1	Won	
Soompi Awards	2013	Best Female Group	2NE1	Won	
Soompi Awards	2014	Best Female Group	2NE1	Won	
Space Shower Music Video Awards	2012	50 Best Works of 2011	"I Am the Best"	Nominated	
Style Icon Awards	2009	Best Female Singer	2NE1	Won	
Style Icon Awards	2010	Best Female Singer	2NE1	Won	
Style Icon Awards	2011	Best Female Singer	2NE1	Nominated	
Style Icon Awards	2012	World Dominators	2NE1	Nominated	
Teen Choice Awards	2015	Choice International Artist	2NE1	Nominated	
V Chart Awards	2015	Best Music Video of the Year – Korea	"Come Back Home"	Won	
World Music Awards	2014	World's Best Video	"Missing You"	Nominated	
World Music Awards	2014	World's Best Group	2NE1	Nominated	
World Music Awards	2014	World's Best Live Act	2NE1	Nominated	
Yahoo! Asian Buzz Awards	2009	Top Buzz Star: Female Category	2NE1	Nominated	
Yahoo! Asian Buzz Awards	2010	Top Buzz Star: Female Category	2NE1	Nominated	
You2Play Awards	2014	Favorite Asian Artist	2NE1	Nominated	
You2Play Awards	2014	Favorite Asian Music Video	2NE1	Nominated	
YouTube K-Pop Awards	2011	Popularity Video Award	"I Am the Best"	Won	
YouTube Music Awards	2015	Honored Artist	2NE1	Won	

== Other accolades ==
=== State honors ===
Name of country, year given, and name of honor
Country	Year	Honor	Ref.
South Korea (Note: Honors are given at the Korean Popular Culture and Arts Awards, arranged by the Korea Creative Content Agency and hosted by the Ministry of Culture, Sports and Tourism. They are awarded to those who have contributed to the arts and South Korea's pop culture.)	2012	Prime Minister's Commendation	

=== Listicles ===
Name of publisher, name of listicle, year listed, and result
Publisher	Year	Listicle	Placement	Ref.
Billboard	2017	10 Best K-Pop Girl Groups of the Past Decade	2nd	
The Dong-a Ilbo	2016	Best Female Artists According to Experts	3rd	
Forbes	2011	Korea Power Celebrity 40	31st	
Forbes	2014	Korea Power Celebrity 40	24th	
Forbes	2015	Korea Power Celebrity 40	17th	
Idolator	2018	The Greatest Girl Groups of All Time	Placed	
IZM	2025	The 25 Greatest Musicians of the first 25 Years of the 21st Century	Placed	
KAIST	2013	Power Entertainers of Korea – Music	1st	
Korea Federation of Copyright Societies (Note: The Korea Federation of Copyright Societies is an association that consists of 10 organizations, including the Korea Music Copyright Association (KOMCA), the Korean Music Performers Association, the Korean Broadcasting Writers Association, and the Korea Press Foundation, and has a total of 300,000 members.)	2023	Korea World Music Culture Hall of Fame ("Come Back Home")	Inducted	
LiveAbout	2018	Top 20 Girl Groups of All Time	Placed	
Screen Rant	2025	The 10 Best Girl Groups of All Time, Ranked	8th	
Teen Vogue	2024	21 Best Girl Groups of All Time	Placed	
Us Weekly	2022	Best Girl Groups of All Time	Placed	
