= 2NE1 =

South Korean girl group

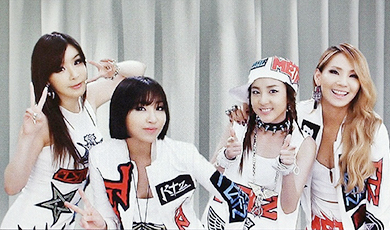
- 2NE1 in 2013; From left to right: Bom, Minzy, Dara and CL

Background information
- Origin: Seoul, South Korea
- Genres: K-pop; hip hop; dance-pop; electropop; R&B
- Works: Discography; live performances
- Years active: 2009–2016; 2024–present
- Labels: YG; Avex; Warner; Capitol; School Boy
- Members: Bom; Dara; CL; Minzy

2NE1 (Korean: 투애니원; RR: Tuaeniwon; pronounced [tʰu.ɛ.ni.wʌn]) is a South Korean girl group formed by YG Entertainment in 2009. The group consists of Bom, Dara, CL, and Minzy. Known for their musical experimentation, fashion, and stage presence, they are leading figures of the Korean Wave and among the most influential K-pop girl groups of all time. They are recognized for breaking K-pop girl group stereotypes due to their edgy and trendy rap and hip hop inspired style of fashion and pop music, as opposed to the hyperfemininity of most Korean girl groups at the time.

The group was introduced in March 2009 after appearing on the promotional single "Lollipop" alongside labelmate BigBang. 2NE1 rose to prominence with the release of their debut eponymous extended play (EP) that same year, which featured the singles "Fire" and "I Don't Care". They followed with their debut album To Anyone (2010). Their second self-titled EP (2011) produced the chart-topping singles "Don't Cry", "Lonely", "I Am the Best", and "Ugly". They embarked on the New Evolution Global Tour in 2012, the first world tour by a Korean girl group; A show at the Prudential Center in New Jersey was named the second-best concert of the year by The New York Times. Their second and final album, Crush (2014), was the first by a Korean artist to appear within the top 100 on the US Billboard 200 and the highest-charting Korean album for two years.

At the end of 2014, 2NE1 had amassed nine No. 1 songs on the Gaon Digital Chart, becoming the group with the most number-one singles in South Korea. They took a two-year hiatus, after which in 2016, Minzy left the group and YG Entertainment announced their disbandment. Their final single, "Goodbye", was released in January 2017. They made a surprise reunion performance at Coachella 2022, and in 2024, announced a reunion under YG. They embarked on the Welcome Back Tour that same year, which attracted over 250,000 people.

2NE1's accolades include nine Melon Music Awards, ten MAMA Awards, and eleven Cyworld Digital Music Awards. They were the first artists to receive all three daesangs (grand prizes) at the MAMA Awards, doing so within two years of their debut. They have sold over 66 million digital and physical records worldwide, making them one of the best-selling girl groups of all time.

== Name ==
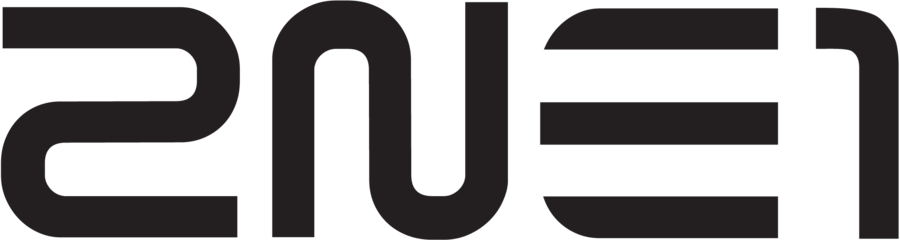
Logo of 2NE1

The group was named "21" until the discovery of a singer with the same stage name; "2NE1", spoken in Korean to the approximate English pronunciation for "to anyone" and "twenty-one", is said to combine "21" for "21st century" and "NE" for "New Evolution".

== History ==
=== 2006–2008: Formation and pre-debut activities ===
In May 2008, reports began circulating in South Korea media about the lineup of YG Entertainment's upcoming girl group, then dubbed "female BigBang". On May 19, the agency said the new group would include Park Bom and CL—who had previously appeared in the music scene—and Minzy. The agency said Sandara Park might join as well. In early 2009, YG confirmed that the four would debut as part of a group in May of that year, the agency's first girl group to debut since Big Mama in 2003. The company said they had trained for four years and that their debut album would contain songs produced by former 1TYM leader Teddy Park.

=== 2009–2010: 2NE1 1st Mini Album and To Anyone ===
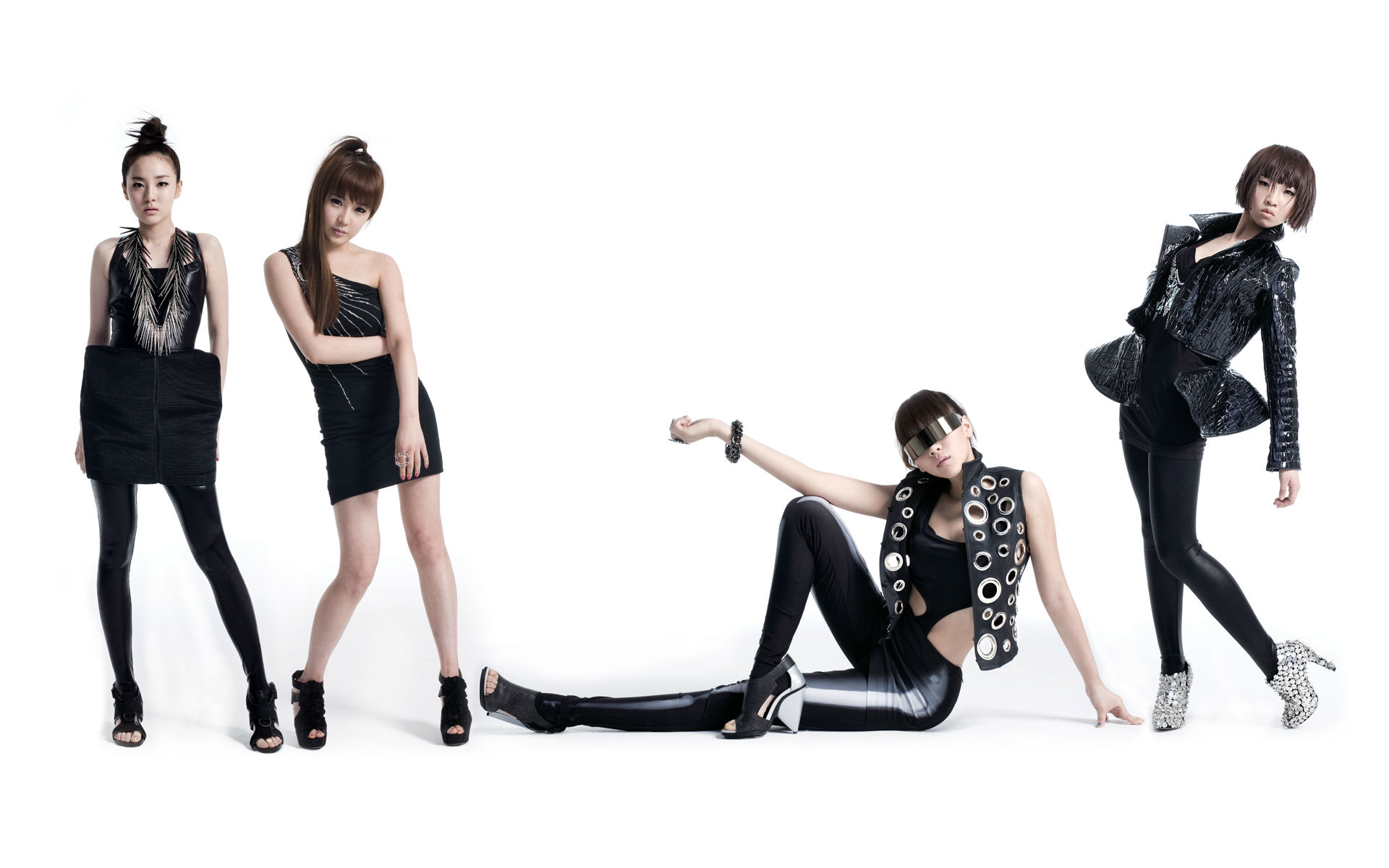
2NE1 promoting their debut EP, 2009

2NE1's first extended play (EP), 2NE1 (2009), was preceded by two singles. The first, "Lollipop", was recorded with labelmate BigBang and released on March 27, 2009, to promote the LG Cyon phone of the same name. Although a music video was filmed, "Lollipop" was not promoted because of its product advertising; this created issues with its eligibility to enter the music charts in South Korea. The second single, "Fire", was written and produced by 1TYM's Teddy Park. The single, featuring elements of hip-hop and reggae, was released in May. Two music videos for "Fire" were released: a "space" version and a "street" version. Within 24 hours of the single's release, both videos each accumulated over one million views—a feat that "has never been seen before." "Fire" and "2NE1" subsequently became popular online search terms. The final single, "I Don't Care", was released alongside their first eponymous EP in July. Promotional activities that followed demonstrated a softer, more feminine image for the group that contrasted the edgier tone conveyed in "Fire". "I Don't Care" was the most-downloaded song that month, and the music platform Bugs later named it the most-downloaded song of the year. It topped the platform's chart, with four of the group's other songs tracking in the top 100, making 2NE1 the group with the most top-100 songs on Bugs in 2009. The song was ranked number one on Cyworld's 2009 year-end popularity chart in January 2010, the third consecutive track by a YG group to top the annual list.

Although group members recorded and released solo material throughout late 2009, 2NE1 performed a reggae version of "I Don't Care" on Inkigayo in September; the reggae version became popular and was released as a digital single on September 3. Buoyed by the singles' success, sales of 2NE1 reached 120,000 units by the following year. 2NE1 performed at the sixth Asia Song Festival in 2009, representing Korea with three other groups and receiving the Asian Newcomer Award. In February 2010, the group released "Follow Me" digitally to promote the Samsung Corby Folder cellphone, with no previous announcement. The song peaked at number one on the Gaon Digital Chart. 2NE1 traveled to Los Angeles and London in mid-2010 to record English-language songs for an American debut album with music producer Will.i.am of the Black Eyed Peas, recording 10 songs in their initial sessions.

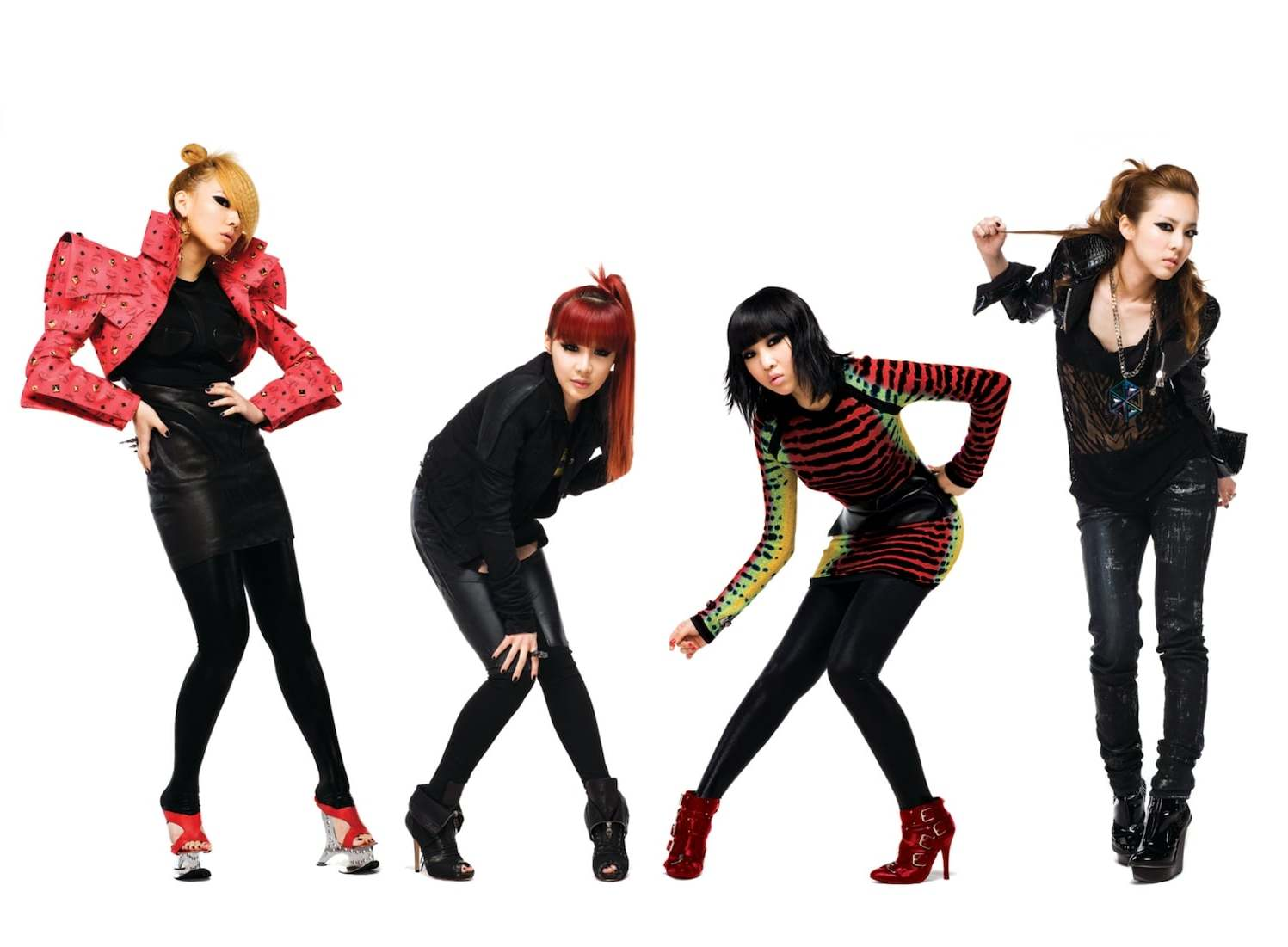
A promotional shoot for "Can't Nobody" in 2010

The group released its first full-length album, To Anyone, on September 9. It debuted at number seven on the Billboard World Album Chart and amassed 120,000 preorders before its release. Several of To Anyone's twelve tracks were released as singles, and the top-three hits "Clap Your Hands", "Can't Nobody", and "Go Away" were released with the album. 2NE1 was the first group in K-pop history to have three singles from one album top different music program charts, and was the first artist to top the Inkigayo chart for four consecutive weeks. The Halloween-themed music video for the fourth single from To Anyone, "It Hurts (Slow)", was released on October 31. A fifth track, "Don't Stop the Music", was released on November 26; the song, recorded as a "special gift for Thai fans", was also used in conjunction with the group's Yamaha Fiore endorsement.

=== 2011–2012: 2NE1 2nd Mini Album and Japanese debut ===
On January 19, 2011, the English-language version of "Can't Nobody " was released by the Japanese digital retailer Recochoku as a ringtone and ringback tone. The following month, its music video was made available for download through iTunes Japan. The group went on to hold The Party, their one-off solo concert held at the Araneta Coliseum in Manila, Philippines on June 4, 2011, both as their first ever solo and international concert. The group's Japanese debut single, "Go Away", was released as a ringtone on March 9; it was later used as the theme song for the Japanese television program Mezamashi TV. 2NE1's first Korean EP, 2NE1, was released in Japan on March 16, 2011; promotional activities were canceled, however, due to the Tōhoku earthquake and tsunami. 2NE1 debuted at number 24 on the Oricon charts, selling 3,860 copies in its first week. Plans for their Japanese debut on Music Station were postponed due to the earthquake, and the group participated in the Naver "Pray for Japan" campaign with other Korean celebrities to raise funds for earthquake victims.

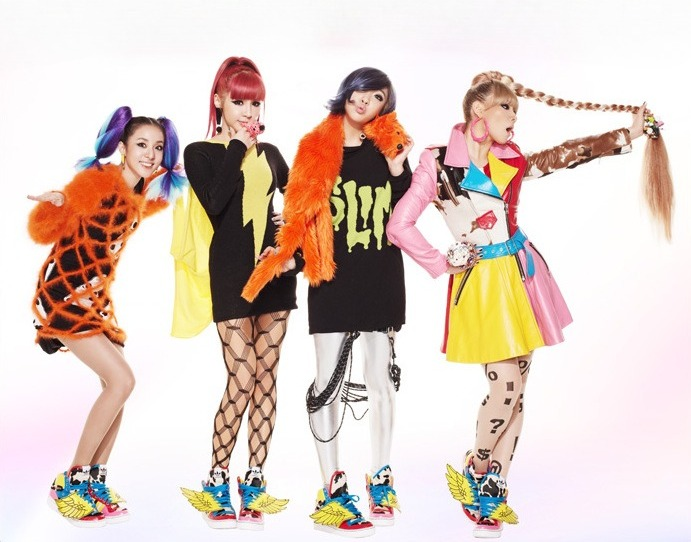
2NE1 promoting the Japanese release of "Go Away", 2011

The group released its second EP, 2NE1 (2011), with the number-one hits "Lonely", "I Am the Best" and "Ugly", and the top-three hit "Hate You". Bom's solo single "Don't Cry" additionally reached number one for two consecutive weeks. The EP was a success, topping the Gaon Music Chart and selling over 108,000 copies. Spin Magazine ranked the EP the sixth-best pop album of 2011, ahead of albums by Coldplay, Ellie Goulding and Rihanna. In late August, 2NE1 began their Nolza Tour with a solo concert at the Olympic Hall in Seoul's Chamsil Olympic Park. Originally scheduled for August 27 and 28, tickets for both dates sold out instantly, and a third show on August 26 was added. The singles from the second EP were some of the year's most popular songs in South Korea. Three reached the top 10 of the year-end 2011 Gaon Digital Chart: "Lonely" at number four, "Don't Cry" at number five, and "I Am the Best" at number 7.

2NE1 embarked on their first Japanese concert tour in September at the Yokohama Arena as part of their Nolza Tour. All 70,000 tickets were sold out within a day and revenue from the concerts was expected to exceed ₩10 billion. The Japanese edition of 2NE1 2nd Mini Album was released on September 21, 2011, which sold over 48,000 copies and reached number one on the Oricon Albums Chart, making 2NE1 the second South Korean girl group to top the chart in its history. The Japanese-language versions of "I Am the Best", "Hate You", "Go Away", and "Lonely" were also released. That October, MTV's Iggy held a global competition in which 10 bands from all around the world competed in a voting competition for the title of "Best New Band". With their song "I Am the Best", the group was awarded the title on November 10, 2011, making it their first American award. 2NE1 traveled to and performed at New York City's Times Square in December to accept the honor, where they were described as "an unparalleled presence in today's K-Pop scene". MTV wrote that "it's a sign of the times", symbolizing "America opening its doors to pop music from around the world". At the end of 2011, 2NE1 was awarded the New Artist Award at the 53rd Japan Record Awards.

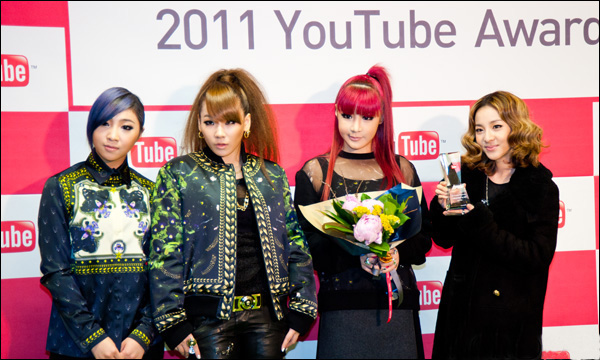
2NE1 at the YouTube K-pop Awards in November 2011

On March 28, 2012, 2NE1 released their first full-length Japanese album Collection along with their second Japanese single "Scream". The album includes Japanese versions of their Korean songs such as "Love Is Ouch", "Fire", and "I Don't Care", and a cover of Madonna's 1984 hit song "Like A Virgin". Multiple editions of the album were released, some of which include a DVD containing the group's Japanese and Korean music videos, according to Oricon's music website. The album peaked at number 5 on the Oricon Daily Chart and sold over 32,000 copies in Japan. Later that year, 2NE1 were invited to perform at the 2012 Springroove festival in Japan alongside American and Japanese hip hop artists. 2NE1 and the subgroup GD & TOP had been invited to play at the festival the previous year, but it was canceled due to the Japanese earthquake and tsunami disaster. 2NE1 also collaborated with Japanese hip-hop group M-Flo for the song "She's So (Outta Control)", which is included on M-Flo's sixth studio album Square One. "She's So (Outta Control)" was released as the album's lead single on February 29 and reached number 43 on the Billboard Japan Hot 100.

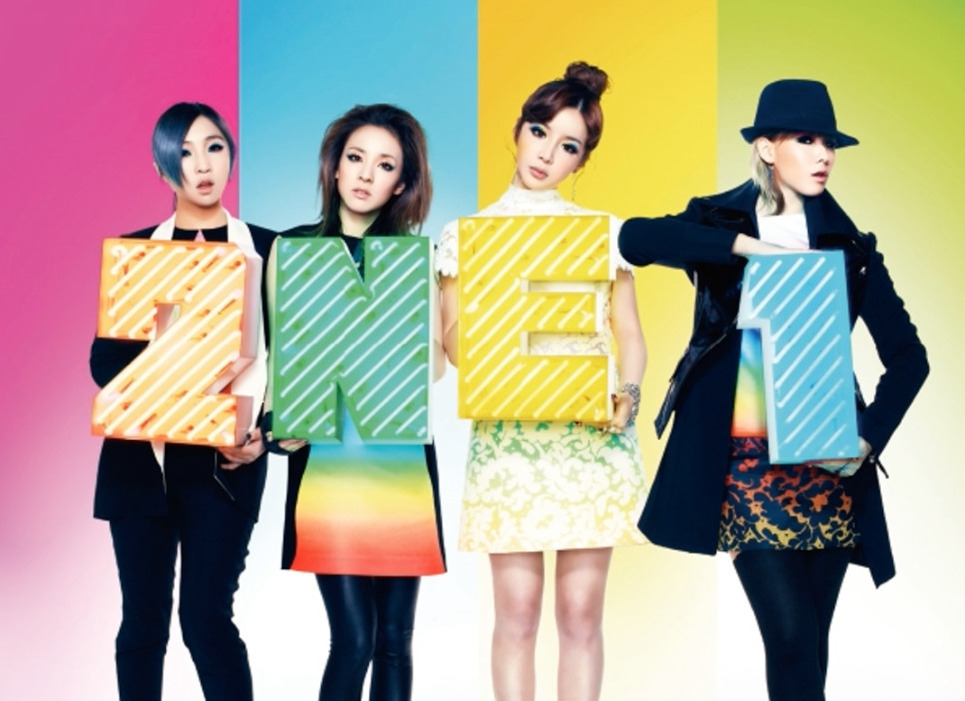
2NE1 promoting "Scream" in 2012

In May 2012, 2NE1 performed at the International Recognized Exhibition Expo 2012 opening ceremony in Yeosu. In recognition of their unique musical style, fashion, and contributions in the global spread of Hallyu, 2NE1 were chosen by Cheil Communications in to speak for international advertising and communication experts at the world's largest advertising event, the Cannes Lions International Advertising Festival in June; in a survey conducted by the Paris office of the Korea Tourism Organization, they were voted as the favorite K-pop girl group among French Hallyu fans, with nearly 65% of the vote. The group concluded their Japanese promotions by performing at the 2012 MTV Video Music Awards Japan, which took place on June 23 at the Makuhari Messe, where they won the Best New Artist Video award for "I Am the Best". A non-album single "I Love You" was released in Korea on July 5, 2012, topping the Gaon Digital Chart and became their sixth number-one single.

At the end of that month, 2NE1 embarked on their first worldwide concert tour and second overall, the New Evolution Global Tour. It included 15 shows in various countries throughout Asia and North America from July to December, attracting a total of 180,000 people, and was the first world tour by a K-pop girl group. Following the group's Los Angeles concert at the Nokia Theatre L.A Live, 2NE1 become the first K-pop girl group to be listed on the Billboard Current Box Score listing, ranking at number 29 with over $650,000 in ticket sales from a virtually sold-out concert. Black Eyed Peas members Will.i.am, Apl.de.ap and chairman of Interscope Records, Jimmy Iovine also attended the concert. Shortly after the conclusion of the tour, 2NE1 and BigBang made MTV Style's list of "Best Band Style of 2012"; the two YG Entertainment groups were the only Asian acts to appear on the list of 10, which included the western groups One Direction, The Wanted, Backstreet Boys, Spice Girls, Destiny's Child, Fun, and No Doubt.

=== 2013–2014: Crush and international success ===
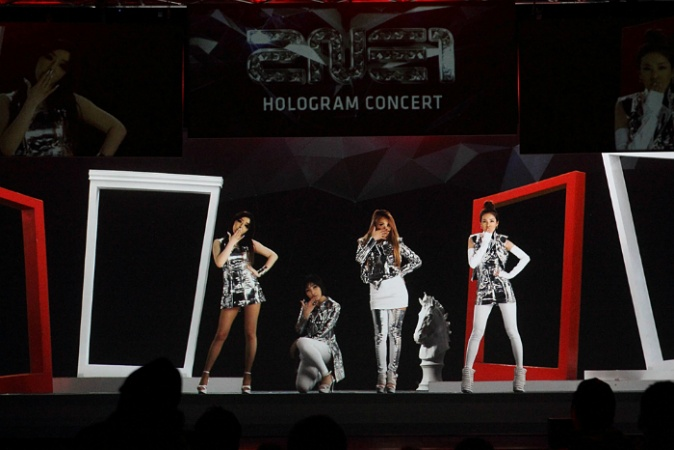
2NE1 in 2013

2NE1 released the English-language single "Take the World On", a collaboration with American singer Will.i.am, on March 14, 2013. The song was used in a commercial for the Intel Ultrabook series of laptops. On March 21, in an Elle interview, CL confirmed that the group had not yet planned an album for the United States but wanted to produce more songs in English. A second collaboration with will.i.am produced "Gettin' Dumb", which included his bandmate Apl.de.ap. The song appears on will.i.am's second album, #willpower, which was released on April 23, 2013. 2NE1's next singles were not on an album; the chart-topping, reggae-themed "Falling in Love" was released on July 8, 2013. On July 22, the song was voted MTV Iggy's "Song of the Summer" by readers of the website. The second non-album single, "Do You Love Me", was released on August 7 and became a top-three hit. In October, it was announced that 2NE1 had been appointed honorary ambassadors for the Korea Brand & Entertainment Expo 2013 in London. The ballad "Missing You" was the group's third standalone single of the year and was released on November 21. It topped the Gaon Digital Chart and received more than one million downloads by the end of the following year. According to Invest Chosun, the group collectively grossed ₩40 billion in 2013.

In January 2014, 2NE1 appeared on an episode of The Bachelor and the finale of America's Next Top Model (filmed in South Korea). The group released Crush, its second Korean-language studio album, the following month. The singles "Come Back Home" and "Gotta Be You" were released at the same time; "Come Back Home" topped the Gaon Digital Chart for two consecutive weeks and was the group's ninth (and final) number-one single in South Korea, extending their lead for the most number-one singles on Gaon by idol groups. Furthermore, the rest of the songs on the record also experienced success on the charts; Nine out of Crush's 10 tracks made the top 20 on the weekly comprehensive chart for two weeks. The album sold 10,000 copies in the U.S. and peaked at number 61 on the Billboard 200 chart, setting a US record for the highest-charting and best-selling K-pop album. A Los Angeles Times article said that the album was "doing more important work than crossing over — it's ushering in K-pop's future, in America and everywhere." The music video for "Gotta Be You" was released on May 21 as a celebration of the fifth anniversary of the group's debut. 2NE1 released the Japanese edition of Crush on June 25, 2014, and it reached number four on the Oricon Daily Album Chart.

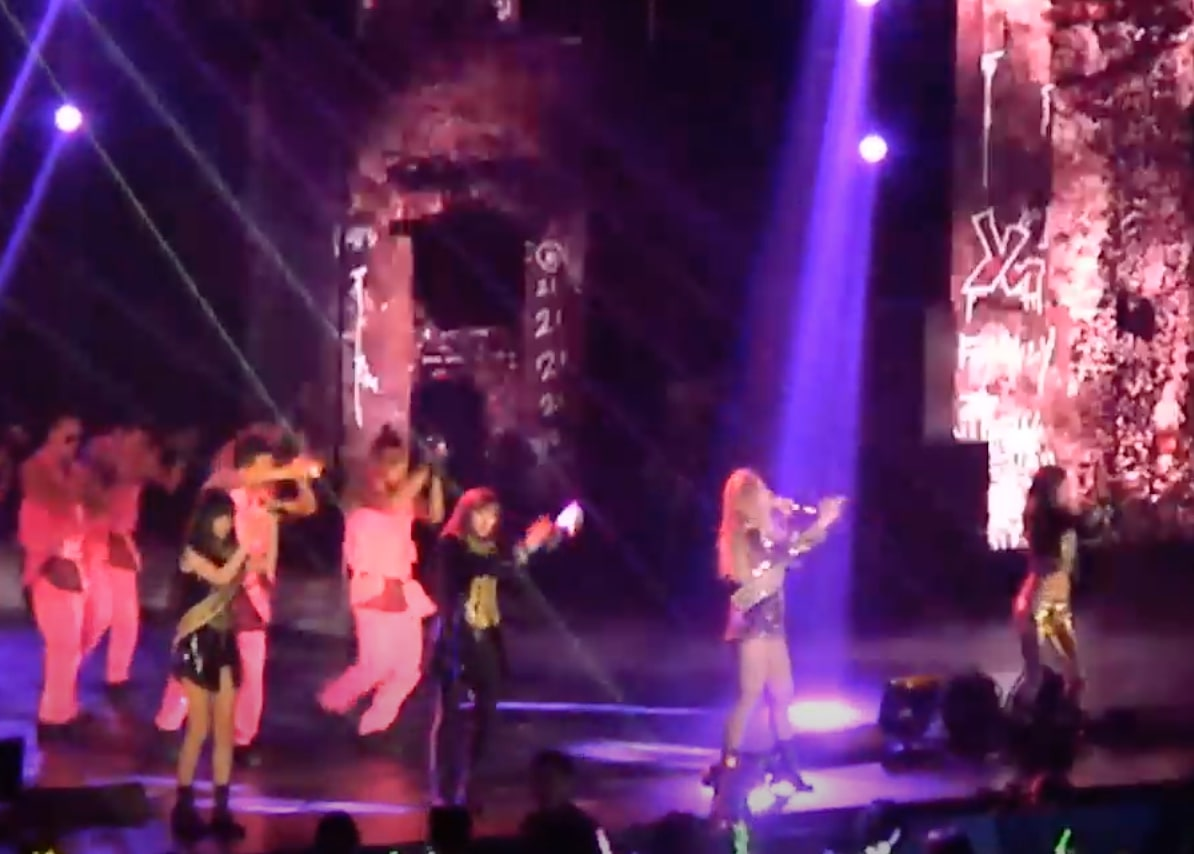
All or Nothing World Tour in Shanghai, 2014

2NE1 began its third tour, the All or Nothing World Tour, after the release of Crush. The tour stopped in China, Singapore, Taiwan, Thailand, the Philippines, Japan, and Malaysia for twenty concerts in 16 cities between March and October. The group received worldwide recognition at the end of 2014. Crush appeared on several publications' year-end lists; it was the only record by an Asian artist to be selected for Fuse TV's "40 Best Albums of 2014" and Rolling Stone's Best Pop Albums of 2014, ranking alongside albums by Taylor Swift, Ariana Grande, and Maroon 5. It also topped Billboard magazine's list of the year's best K-pop albums. Crush placed eleventh on Billboard's year-end World Album chart, the chart's first entry by a K-pop group. The group's 2011 single, "I Am the Best", was featured on Microsoft's Surface Pro 3 "Head to Head" commercial in August 2014. The song, the first by a K-pop group to top the Billboard World Digital Song Sales chart, received airplay on radio stations in New York and Boston and was one of the few non-English songs played on US radio. Due to its renewed popularity, it was released in the US on December 10 by Capitol Records.

Later that month, MTV Iggy included "Gotta Be You" on its list of 2014's top 14 global pop songs; a readers' poll made it the website's song of the year. On December 21, 2014, 2NE1 performed "Crush" and "Come Back Home" at the 2014 SBS Gayo Daejeon and received the Best Female Group award. The Straits Times named 2NE1 one of the top 10 most streamed Asian artists in Singapore during 2014, the only appearance from a K-pop artist. It was reported the following month that 2NE1's earnings for the first half of 2014 totaled ₩27.5 billion (US$23.4 million), placing the group among South Korea's highest-earning entertainers.

=== 2015–2017: Hiatus, Minzy's departure, disbandment ===
2NE1 was one of two Asian performers honored at the March 2015 YouTube Music Awards. Dara re-established her acting career, starring in web dramas such as Dr.Ian, We Broke Up, and KBS's Missing You; Minzy opened the Millennium Dance Academy. CL began a solo career in the US with the release of "Hello Bitches". 2NE1's only group activity in 2015 was a surprise performance at the 2015 Mnet Asian Music Awards in Hong Kong: after CL's performance of her solo singles "The Baddest Female" and "Hello Bitches", 2NE1 reunited to perform "Fire" and "I Am the Best". The performance was the most-viewed MAMA performance by a girl group. Fuse named it one of the best performances of 2015, alongside those of Beyoncé and Madonna; 2NE1 was one of two non-Western acts mentioned by the website. The group was the 16th-most-reblogged K-pop group on Tumblr for 2015, and Spotify mentioned 2NE1 and CL in its "Year in Music" Twitter campaign for achieving over one million listeners and being played for a combined time of 165 years.

2NE1 received China's 2016 Korea First Brand Grand Prize award for the "Top 10 Most Anticipated K-Stars of 2016". After more than a year of hiatus in April 2016, YG Entertainment confirmed Minzy's departure from 2NE1. On November 25, 2016, however, the company announced that 2NE1 would be disbanding; CL and Dara remained signed as solo artist and Bom was released from her contract. On January 21, 2017, the group released their last single "Goodbye" which was recorded by the three remaining members, inspired by a letter that CL wrote to Minzy after she left the group. The song became their second single to top the Billboard World Digital Songs chart and entered the national charts in France and Finland.

In 2021, Minzy and CL revealed that they were not informed of 2NE1's disbandment beforehand, contradicting YG's statement that the decision had been made after "long discussions" with the remaining members. The news triggered significant public backlash against YG, with many criticizing the agency's lack of communication and mismanagement.

=== 2022–present: Reunion and 15th anniversary tour ===
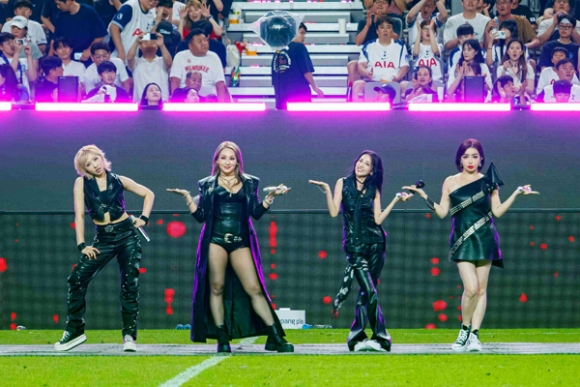
2NE1 performing at Tottenham vs Newcastle halftime show in Seoul in 2025

On April 16, 2022, all four members of the group reunited to perform "I Am the Best" at the Coachella festival. It marked the group's first performance in over six years since the 2015 Mnet Asian Music Awards in December 2015. 2NE1's performance was well received by commentators, with Teen Vogue writing that their appearance is "officially going down in history" as one of "the most exciting reunions in recent memory". The A.V. Club ranked it one of the year's 10 best Coachella performances, while Variety named it one of the key moments in K-pop during 2022. L'Officiel Singapore deemed it amongst 10 biggest pop culture moments of the year.

On July 22, 2024, YG Entertainment announced that 2NE1 would be reuniting for a series of shows to celebrate their 15th anniversary. Their fourth concert tour, the Welcome Back Tour, began at Seoul's Olympic Hall on October 4, 2024. On December 9, it was announced that 2NE1 will perform at the 2024 SBS Gayo Daejeon for the first time in 10 years. They performed a medley of singles including "Fire", "I Don't Care", "Ugly", and "I Am the Best". The Welcome Back Tour concluded at the KSPO Dome in Seoul on April 13, 2025, drawing over 250,000 people in total with a gross of $44 million. Due to medical advice calling for increased rest, Bom announced a temporary hiatus from her activities with 2NE1 on August 6, 2025.

== Other ventures ==
=== Endorsements ===
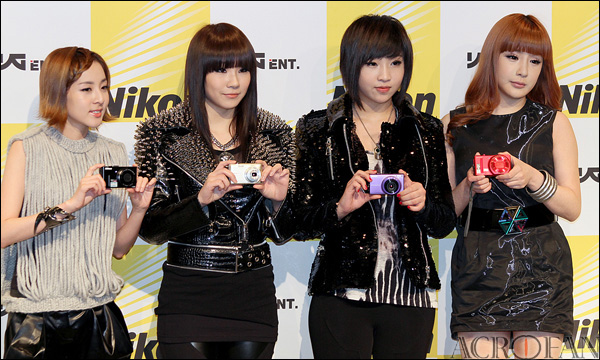
2NE1 at Nikon & YG's "A Shot A Day" ceremony in 2011

2NE1 has been featured in numerous advertisements and promotional campaigns throughout their career, endorsing multinational corporations such as Intel, Nikon, Adidas, Samsung, LG, Etude House, Singtel, Nintendo, Fila, among others. Following the introduction of 2NE1's characters in the video game Sudden Attack in September 2009, the group earned over ₩2.2 billion (US$2 million) from character purchases within seven months alone. In January 2011, 2NE1 were named amongst the highest-earning celebrities in South Korea with an asking price of ₩800–900 million per endorsement—the highest range among girl groups in the country. TVCF ranked them among the top 10 most popular CF models of the year in South Korea, and were only one of the three idol groups listed.

In 2012, 2NE1 were highlighted as one of the first emerging global CF stars representing South Korea with their worldwide endorsement campaigns of Adidas and Intel, with contracts worth over ₩1 billion each. In early May 2013, the website "2NE1Loves.com" was launched with videos of the members; the project was later revealed as a "2NE1 Loves Shinsegae" endorsement for a department store and for Chrome Hearts. 2NE1's songs have been used in various advertisements; "Lollipop" for the LG Cyon phone, "Try to Follow Me" for Samsung's Corby Folder, and "Don't Stop the Music" for the Yamaha Fiore. "Go Away" was used as the theme song for the Japanese television program Mezamashi TV.

=== Philanthropy ===
In the aftermath of the 2011 Tōhoku earthquake and tsunami, 2NE1 participated in Naver's "Pray for Japan" campaign to help raise funds for victims. Following the group's Going Together Concert in Hanoi in November 2011, 2NE1 donated ₩25 million won from the revenue earned from the concert to support scholarships for Vietnamese students. In January 2012, the group donated ₩20 million won to the Yonsei University Severance Hospital for hearing-impaired children from low-income families. Beginning in July of that year, multiple fansites of 2NE1 raised around ₩20 million as part of Tree Planet Korea's "Star Forest Project" in efforts to prevent desertification and minimize food shortages in Africa. Around 1,300 mango trees were planted in the village of Tonj, South Sudan by 2013 and was named the "2NE1 Forest" in honor of the group and its fans.

== Artistry ==
=== Influences ===
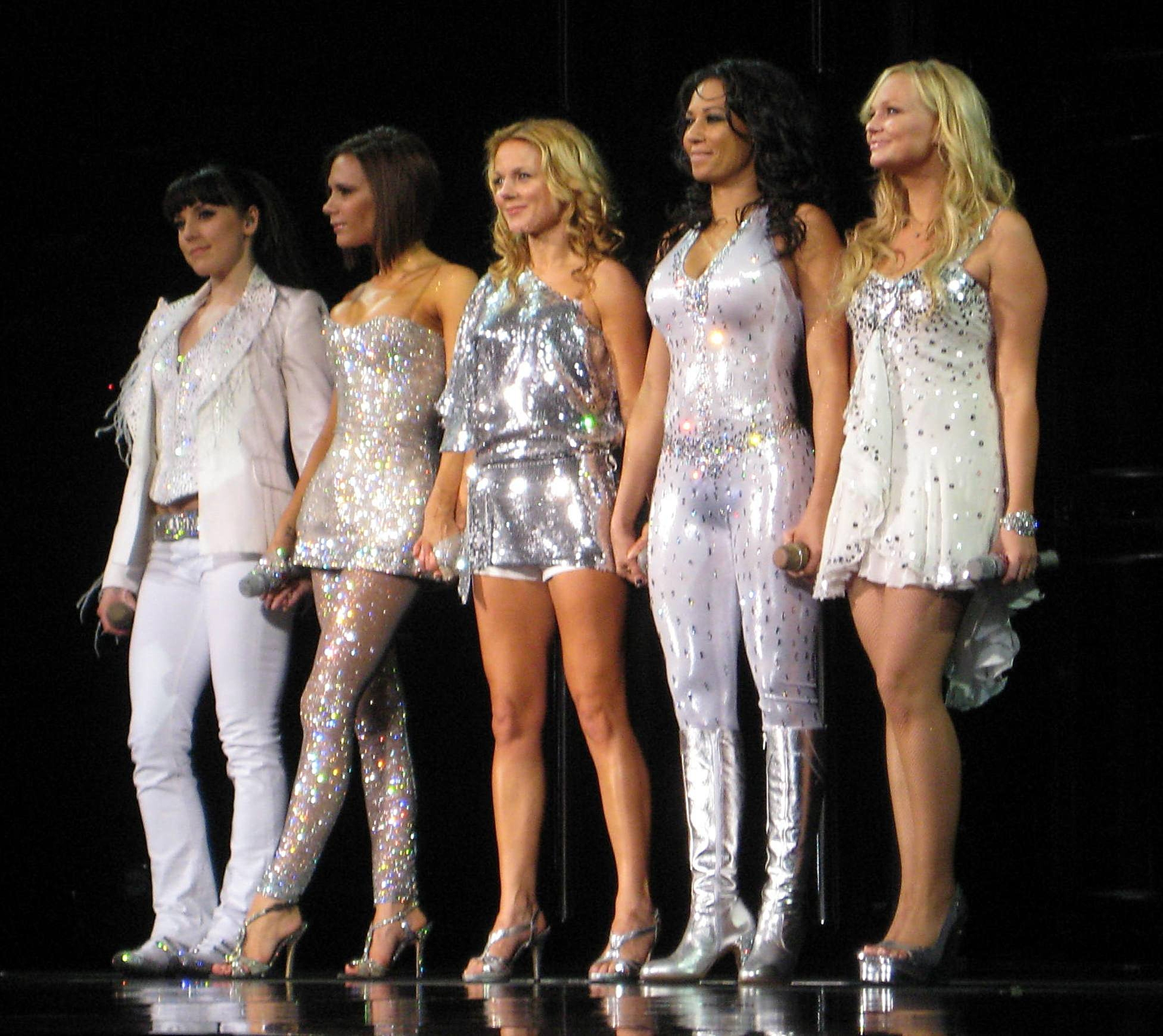
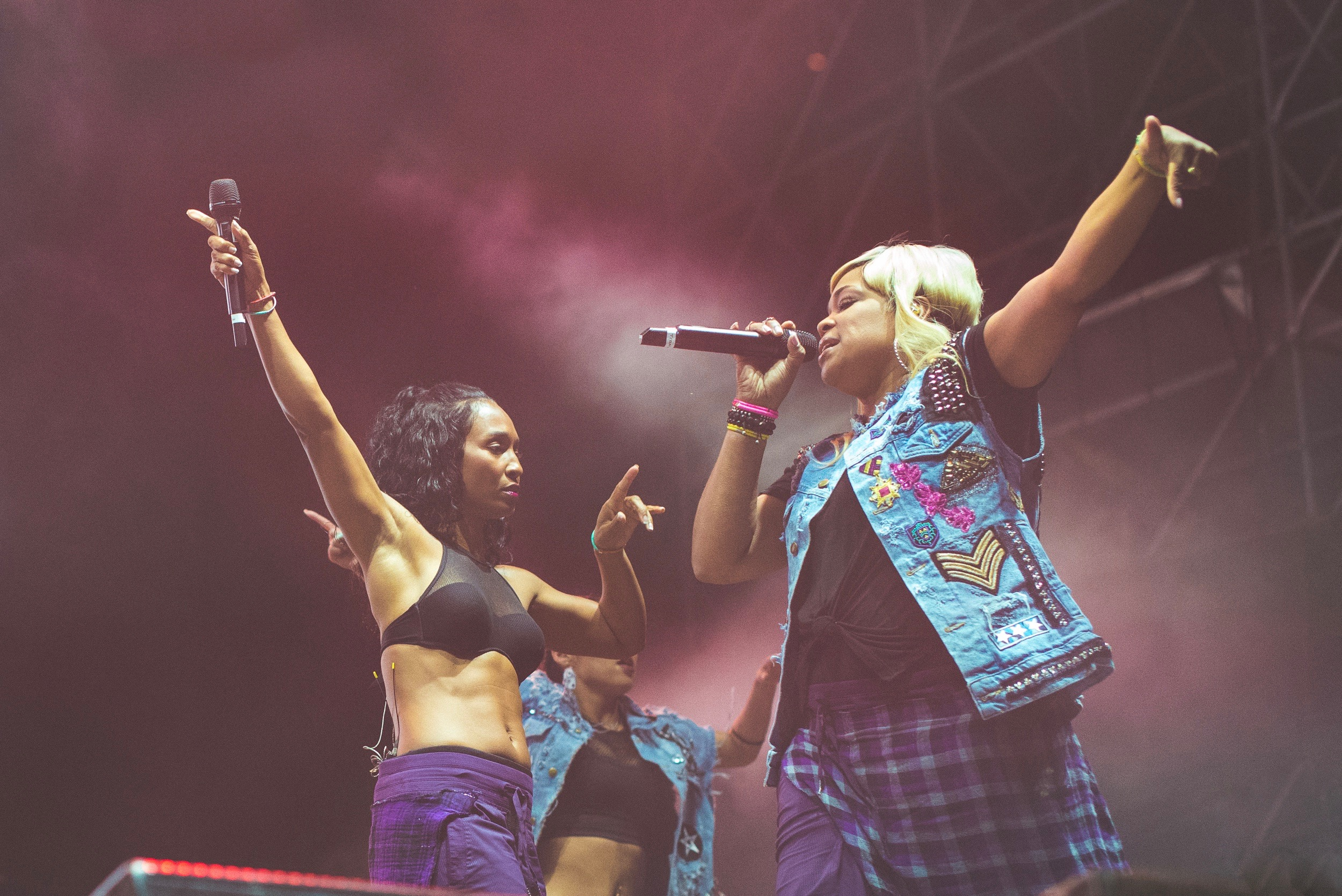
2NE1 has cited Spice Girls (top) and TLC (bottom) as girl group influences.

2NE1 has credited the Spice Girls and TLC as musical influences. Observers have compared 2NE1 to the Spice Girls for embodying the "girl power" mantra in South Korea—a concept that the latter popularized globally in the 1990s. In an article published through Yahoo! Singapore in June 2011, an editor wrote, "If there is a K-Pop girl group who represents the term 'girl power' most fittingly, it would be 2NE1." The editor noted how the group stood as a representation of "the ideals of female empowerment in music" in the "age of the hallyu phenomenon". 2NE1 has also cited Destiny's Child as an inspiration.

Each member of the group has been described as distinct in voice quality, image and fashion style; Park Bom cited Beyoncé and Mariah Carey as her main influences for their strong vocals and powerful performances and listed hip hop and R&B as her favorite musical genres. Minzy cited Michael Jackson and Rihanna, and group leader CL called producer Teddy Park and American entertainers Madonna and Lauryn Hill her role models. Dara named singer-actress Uhm Jung-hwa as her inspiration, and she idolized Filipino singer Regine Velasquez. She also enjoyed Britney Spears's style and music, citing her as a role model whose songs she sang while growing up.

=== Musical style ===
2NE1 has experimented with numerous musical genres with their songs during their career, encompassing hip hop, R&B, electropop, reggae, and dancehall. NME remarked that, "Beyond themes, the quartet also presented an alternative in terms of genres as well, taking influences from hip-hop, R&B, techno and more – while these sounds were always part of K-pop, but they had never been quite so prominent before in a girl group’s DNA". The group's "ability to produce something fresh and out of the ordinary with every new release", according to ABS-CBN, "has placed them in a league of their own".

2NE1's debut single "Fire" was noted as a catchy hip-hop and electropop number that utilized instrumentations of synthesizers and reggae styles, possessing "loads of attitude" and strong, sophisticated energy. With its infusion of reggae, the song showed the possibility that the genre could become popular in South Korea as it is worldwide, which had previously been described as a "barren land" for the reggae market. Their follow-up single, "I Don't Care", aimed to further make reggae mainstream in the country's music scene; it combined medium-tempo R&B with soft reggae melodies, at the same time showcasing a more feminine side of the group in contrast to their previous release.

"Fire" (2009)
2NE1 debuted with a hip-hop and electropop sound in "Fire". Music critics have credited it for its role in breaking the stereotypical image of South Korean girl groups.

"I Don't Care" (2009)
In "I Don't Care", the group conveyed a more-feminine image than their debut single, with its production drawing influences from reggae.

In their debut studio album, To Anyone (2010), "Go Away" continued with their electropop and dance styles while other tracks such as "It Hurts (Slow)" utilized contemporary R&B. "Clap Your Hands" became known for its urban hip hop while "Can't Nobody" was noted for its catchy hooks, chorus and rap section. Music webzine IZM complimented the album's vitality and musical versatility, but criticized it for its over-reliance on autotune software, calling it a distraction. Their self-titled second mini-album the following year was described as "a collision of electro-house, hip-hop, and pop-rock guitar" and was referred to by Spin as possibly the "year's most boldly thrilling recorded statement." The electro house dance track "I Am the Best" was a "jaw-dropping, vibrant triumph of pure swagger and verve". "Lonely" was a 180-degree transformation from 2NE1's usual musical styles and praised for its acoustic sound and raw vocals.

The trot-infused Eurodance single "I Love You" was described as "a perfect summation of pop's present and future", integrating traditional and modern musical elements with pulsating synths and ghostly background vocals. "Falling in Love" built upon the reggae styles established through their early albums; Complex called it "[breaking] new ground", noting reggae's popularity in the neighboring market of Japan in contrast to it being a relatively newer phenomenon in Korea. "Missing You" saw another diversion from the group's signature sound, characterized for its slow chorus, acoustic guitar, grand piano, and vocal harmony. In their final studio album, Crush (2014), Fuse commented on its composition and the group's knack for genre-melding, "opening with the title track that blends Indian tabla drums and switchboard-button buzzing, followed by the reggae/trap-hybrid single "Come Back Home".

=== Stage performances ===
2NE1's concert tours were also known for a variety of costumes, props, and effects and were well-received by domestic and international media. Their three-day concert in Seoul on their 2011 Nolza tour was praised for the performance atmosphere and members' individual strengths. On their 2012 New Evolution Global Tour, the shows featured an array of costume designs and incorporated stages that were transformed into a theme park, a club, a sporting arena, a fantasy world with giant inflatable props, conveyor belts, and a video wall simulating a roller coaster. In a review of the group's two-day concert at the Olympic Gymnastics Arena, domestic publication SSTV praised the show's production and the live performance: "2NE1 properly showed the essence of performance." AsiaOne called 2NE1 "ace live performers" and "trendsetting style icons in the eyes of devotees around the globe". After the group's August 17 New Jersey concert, The New York Times called the show the second-best concert of 2012. Jeff Benjamin wrote for Billboard that "A few short years ago, it would have been unthinkable that a Korean girl group would have been able to fill up an East Coast arena. But 2NE1 proved that they – and K-Pop in general – are quickly becoming a force to be reckoned with". August Brown of the Los Angeles Times called 2NE1 "every direction that pop culture is going – female, global, digital and danceable" and wrote that the group is "pop [in its] best ways".

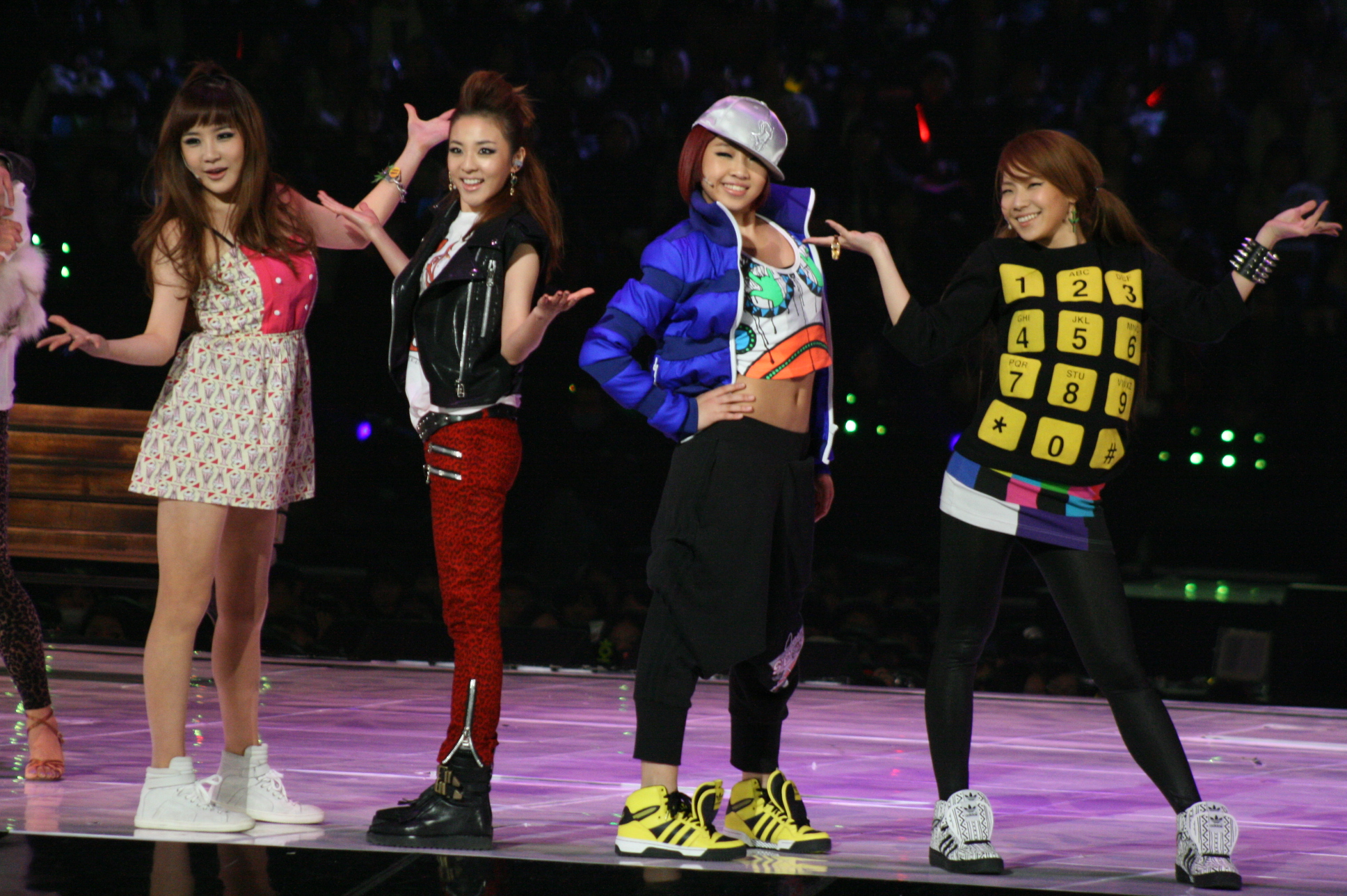
2NE1 performing "I Don't Care" at the 2009 Mnet Asian Music Awards

Since their debut with "Fire" in 2009, 2NE1 has become known for their style, charisma and stage presence. The group's first live performance of "Fire" on SBS's Inkigayo on May 17 of that year was noted for a strong, sophisticated feel and "powerful charms". The performance had a broadcast rating of nearly 15 percent per minute, and Jimmy Iovine of Interscope Records and Perez Hilton expressed fondness for the group. Establishing a hip-hop image with "Fire", the group changed its concept after the release of its eponymous debut mini-album. Their style for "Pretty Boy" included print leopard pants, while they opted for simpler outfits for "I Don't Care" (black-and-white ensembles), showcasing a more-youthful choreography and offering a "unique charm".

=== Fashion ===
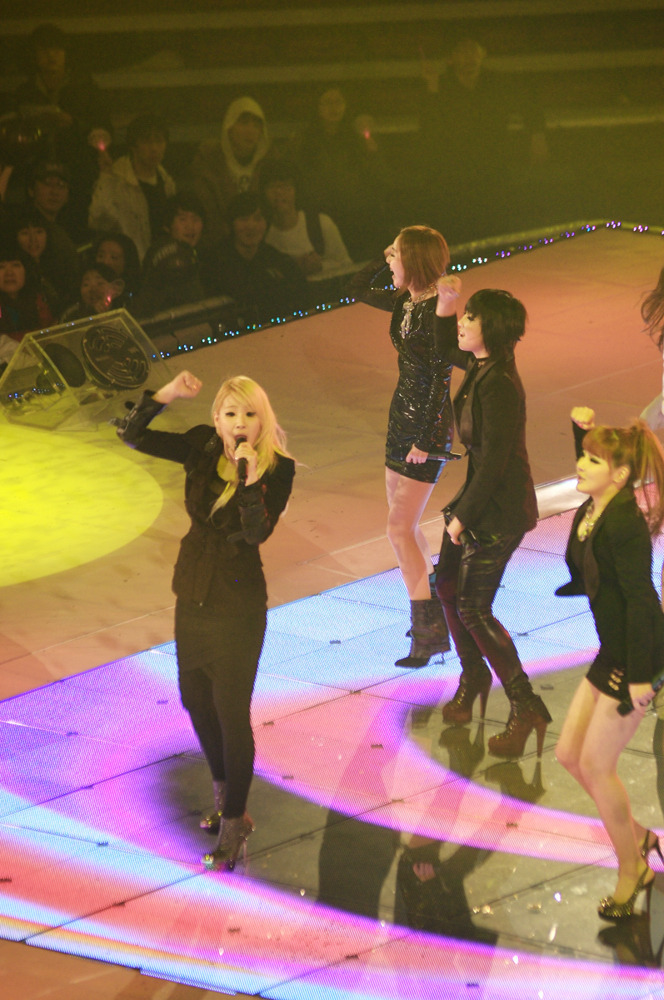
2NE1 at MTV Daum Music Fest 2011

The group has attracted attention for their outlandish, statement-making fashion and have been referred to as regional trendsetters and style icons. Carolina Malis from South China Morning Post said that "[2NE1] constantly defied the traditional Korean female stereotype by embracing daring, colourful and audacious looks that helped make bold make-up a viral beauty trend." The group's concerts often included over 100 custom-made outfits, ranging from street style to modern chic to futurism, which have been called the "2NE1 Collection". Their style was described by Harper's Bazaar Singapore as ranging from ultra-punk to über-glamorous to unapologetically urban. The "fiery, renegade concepts of 2NE1", as CR Fashion Book stated, "captured the essence of independence and rebellion" and attracted the attention of fashion brands worldwide.

In the group's music videos, performances and photoshoots, the members were often seen in Moschino, Alexander Wang, Balmain, Givenchy, Versace, KTZ, Jeremy Scott and Mary Katrantzou and were credited with popularizing international fashion houses such as Givenchy and Balmain in South Korea. In a May 2015 interview, fashion expert David Yi remarked that "[2NE1] started wearing Hood By Air before anyone else did, same with Off-White and a lot of different brands we see at VFiles now. Now it's very trendy to wear these European brands and streetwear brands together." Also distinguished for their individuality, Janelle Okwodu from Vogue noted how girl group members are rarely lauded for their individual fashion style, except for groups like 2NE1 and the Spice Girls. They have experimented with a variety of hairstyles and colors; CL's "bull-horn" hair and Dara's "Vegeta" hair became media topics after the 2011 release of "I Am the Best". Dara's "palm-tree hair", first seen in 2009's "Lollipop", has been described as a definitive look of 2000s K-pop. In a consumer survey researching trends in the Singaporean fashion market in 2013, the group was ranked first among female K-pop artists whose style most wanted to imitate.

== Impact and legacy ==
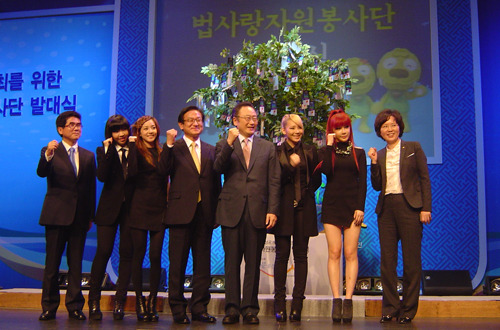
2NE1 as promotional ambassadors for the South Korean Ministry of Justice in 2010

Recognized for breaking the stereotypical K-pop girl-group image, 2NE1 are known for pioneering the "girl crush" concept. In contrast to the "sexy" or "cute" female stereotypes, the group is said to have rewritten history and brought about the expansion of girl group styles in the industry. Rolling Stone called them "undeniably one of the most influential acts" of their generation, widening K-pop's musical scope and stated that in the process, they "exerted a huge influence on the generation of artists" that came after them. KAIST named them the most influential musical artist in their Power Entertainer Korea report in March 2013. Billboard ranked 2NE1 among the top K-pop girl groups of the decade, citing the group for "pav[ing] the way for a more empowered side to K-pop girl groups." SCMP called them one of the most iconic girl groups of their time, while NME wrote that "acts across K-pop [put] their own spin on the genre elements that 2NE1 first popularised."

2NE1 has influenced or inspired numerous artists including I-dle, Aespa, Blackpink, Twice, Babymonster, Meovv, Shinee's Key, AllDay Project's Annie and Youngseo, Ejae, Audrey Nuna, Rei Ami, Illit's Minju, Jeremy Scott, Chungha, Ailee, Jeon Somi, Choi Ye-na, Billlie's Tsuki, Choi Yoo-jung, Kiss of Life, Woo!ah!, Lapillus, Secret Number, Chocolat, Dal Shabet, Stellar, Young Posse, Momoland's Jane, Loona's Vivi, Itzy's Lia, WJSN's Dayoung, TripleS's Kim Na-kyoung and Xinyu, and Fifty Fifty's Sio. In 2024, Han from Stray Kids commented that "2NE1 defined a whole generation and have a lot of influence over many Korean artists". Meovv's Gawon named "I Don't Care" as the song that inspired her to become a singer, while Annie Moon said that seeing 2NE1 in "Lollipop" inspired her to pursue a career as a K-pop idol.

The group's work has been recognized globally—Billboard's Caitlin Kelley called "I Am the Best" "one of the most iconic girl crush concepts on many levels", while Stereogum's Tom Breihan ranked its video the 2nd best music video of the 2010s. Pitchfork named "I Am the Best" one of 45 highlights in girl group history, while Billboard ranked it and "I Love You" the fourth- and 67th-greatest K-pop songs of the 2010s, respectively. "Fire" and "I Am the Best" were considered by music-industry experts some of the genre's defining girl-group songs in Melon and Seoul Shinmun's list of top 100 K-pop masterpieces of all time. GQ named "I Am the Best" one of 24 songs that shaped the decade worldwide, while "Come Back Home" was inducted into the Korea World Music Culture Hall of Fame in 2023.

Rolling Stone Korea remarked that upon disbanding, 2NE1 "was eventually honored in K-pop's hall of fame" as "K-pop welcomed a new generation." Various media publications such as The Independent, Billboard, and Pollstar have referred to them as the "Queens of K-pop", while Official UK Charts called them the "original K-pop queens". In 2017, editor-in-chief of webzine Idology wrote that the group established a new image of Korean female idols and went the farthest, creating a K-pop fandom abroad. Music critic Kim Yun-ha wrote that "the expression 'reminiscent of 2NE1' will remain as an eternal praise of K-pop legends".

== Achievements ==
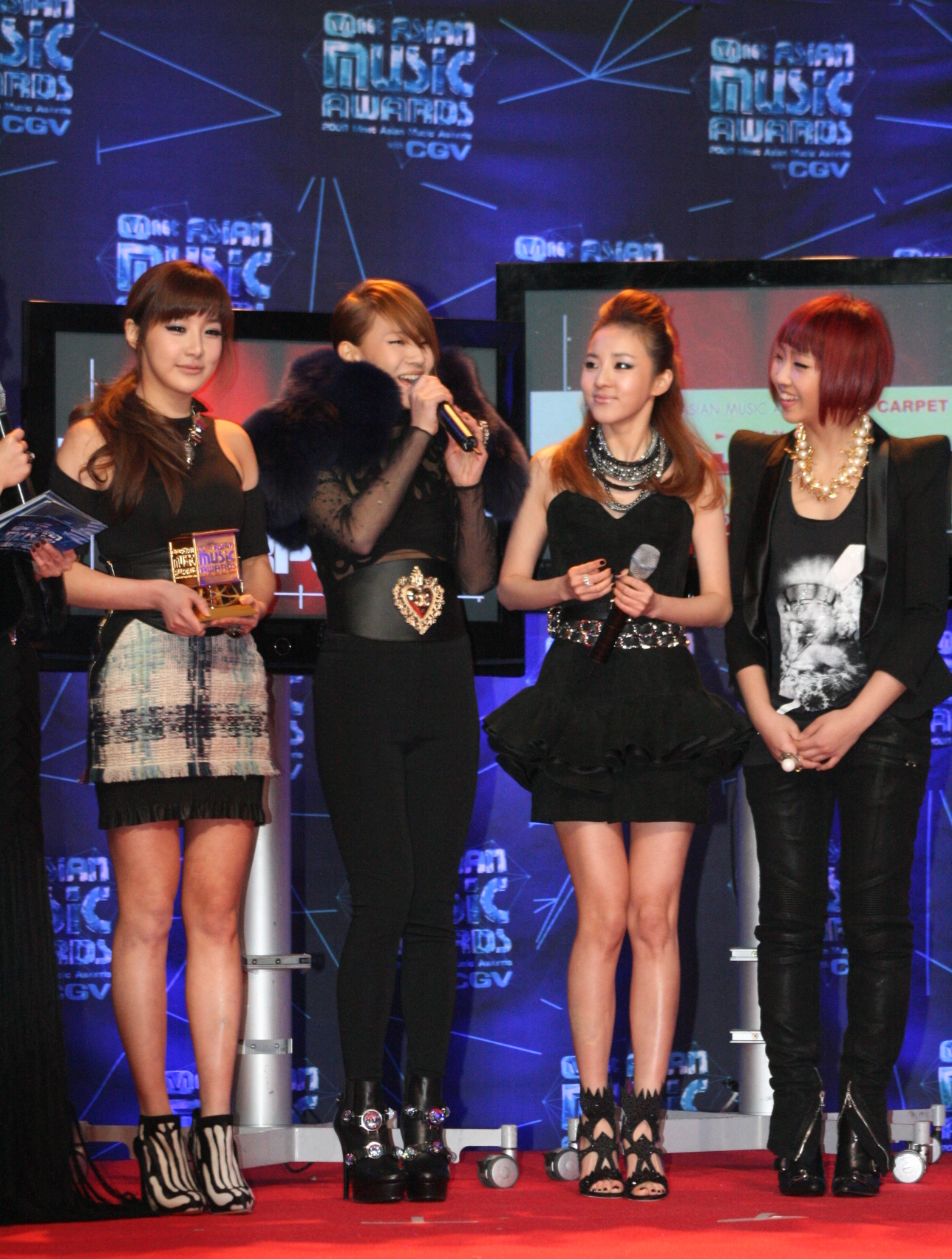
2NE1 at the 2009 Mnet Asian Music Awards

2NE1 received a number of awards and honors. When the group debuted, their song "Fire" and its subsequent live performances were praised as unconventional but impressive. They received their first two awards on the weekly music show Inkigayo, and received more with their next singles on Music Bank. "Fire" was the Cyworld Song of the Month and 2NE1 the Rookie of the Month in May 2009. "I Don't Care" received the Song of the Year award at the 2009 Mnet Asian Music Awards, making 2NE1 the first idol group and musical artist in South Korean history to receive a daesang in their debut year. The group received a number of awards at the Cyworld Digital Music Awards, including Top-Selling Artist, Best Rookie Group, Bonsang Award, and Song of the Year (for "I Don't Care"). At the inaugural Melon Music Awards on December 16, 2009, the group was the only new act chosen as one of the top 10 artists in South Korea and received the Best New Artist award. After analyzing its online music charts throughout 2009, Mnet.com music portal named 2NE1 the "Artist of the Year".

They received the most awards of any group at the 2010 Mnet Asian Music Awards at The Venetian Macao, including two daesangs (Artist of the Year and Album of the Year, for To Anyone), Best Music Video for "Can't Nobody", and Best Female Group. They were the first artist to receive all three daesang awards in the history of the Mnet Asian Music Awards. The group received three awards at the second Melon Music Awards in December 2010, including Album of the Year. 2NE1's second EP received the Album of the Year award at the third Melon Music Awards, although they did not attend the ceremony; they are the only female group to receive the award more than once. At the 2011 Mnet Asian Music Awards, the group received the Song of the Year award for "I Am the Best"—the first artists to receive the award multiple times—while "Lonely" won the Best Vocal Performance – Group award. Following the ceremony, the group received a total of four daesangs (two Songs of the Year, one Album of the Year, and one Artist of the Year), and remains the most by any female act at MAMA.

In November 2012, 2NE1 received the Prime Minister Commendation at Korean Popular Culture and Arts Awards, an honor bestowed in recognition of public service and/or excellence in a given field. The organization called them a leading figure of the Korean Wave, contributing to the development of popular culture with their powerful image and music. From 2009 to 2013, 16 of their songs placed within the top 100 on the annual Melon record charts—making them the act with the fourth-most digital hit songs in South Korean history, following SG Wannabe, BigBang, and Davichi. Star News named 1st Mini Album (2009), To Anyone (2010), and 2nd Mini Album (2011) among the most successful digital albums in history, with the former two albums being the top digital albums of that year. Gaon Music Chart further named them the artist with the most hit songs in South Korea during 2011. 2NE1 has sold a cumulative total of 66 million digital and physical records worldwide, making them one of the best-selling girl groups of all time.

== Members ==
- Bom (봄) — Inactive due to medical reasons
- Dara (다라)
- CL (씨엘) — leader
- Minzy (민지)

== Discography ==
- To Anyone (2010)
- Crush (2014)

== Filmography ==
- Style (2009)
- Girlfriends (2009)
- 2NE1 TV (2009)
- 2NE1 TV Season 2 (2010)
- 2NE1 TV Live: Worldwide (Season 3) (2011)
- America's Next Top Model (2014)
- The Bachelor – Juan Pablo (2014)
- The Tim Yap Show (2014)

== Tours ==
=== Concert tours ===
- Nolza Tour (2011)
- New Evolution Global Tour (2012)
- All or Nothing World Tour (2014)
- Welcome Back Tour (2024–2025)

=== Other concerts ===
- YG Family Concert (2010)
- YG Family 15th Anniversary Concert (2011–2012)
- YG Family World Tour: Power (2014)

== See also ==
- List of best-selling girl groups
