= I Love You (2NE1 song) =

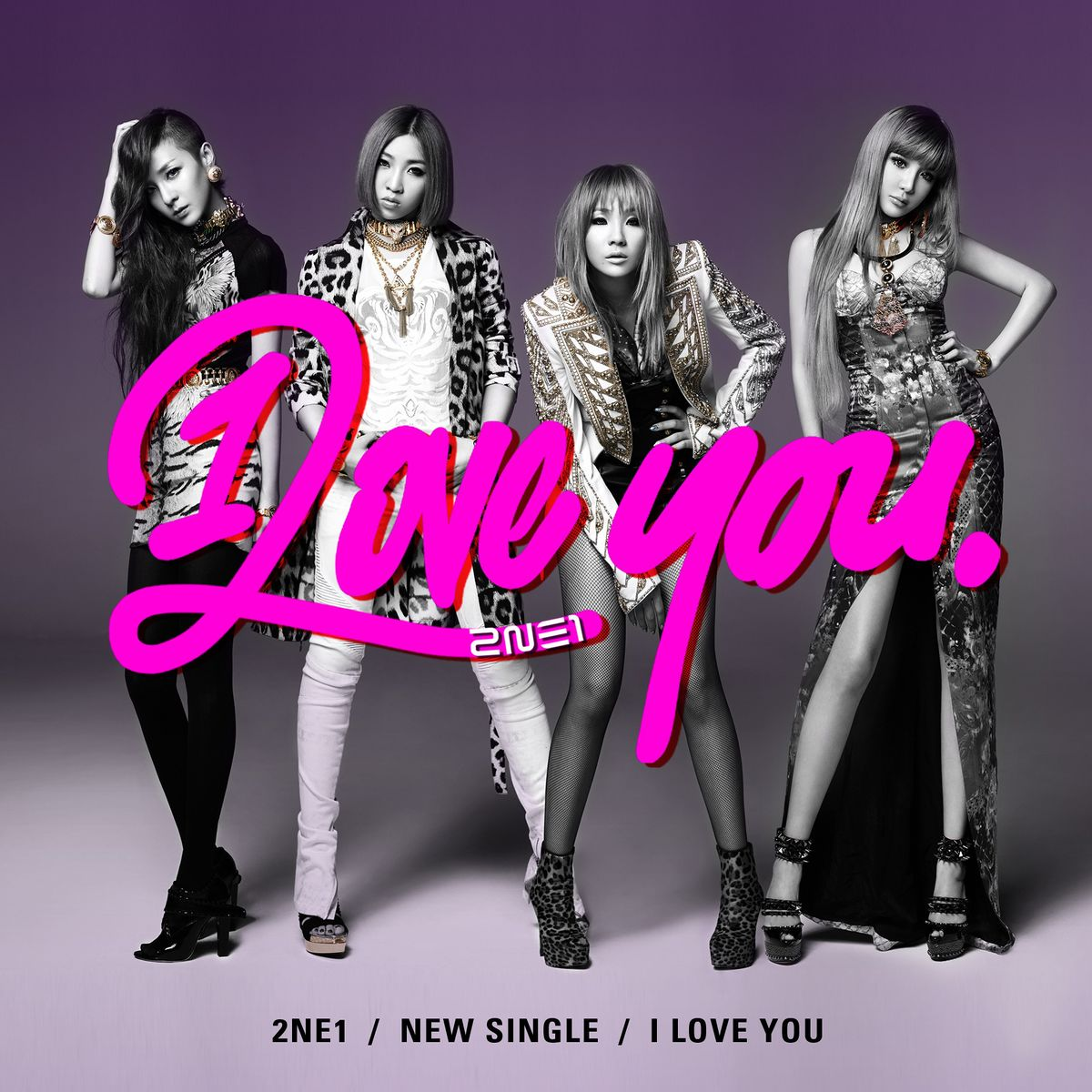
- Korean version cover. On Japanese versions' artwork, the colors are slightly altered.

Single by 2NE1
- Released: July 5, 2012
- Recorded: 2012
- Genre: Dance-pop; synth-pop
- Length: 3:57
- Label: YG; Avex
- Songwriters: Teddy Park; Lydia Paek
- Producer: Teddy Park

2NE1 singles chronology
"Scream" (2012)	"I Love You" (2012)	"Falling in Love" (2013)

Music video
- "I Love You" on YouTube

"I Love You" is a song recorded by South Korean girl group 2NE1. The Korean version was released for digital download and streaming on July 5, 2012, through YG Entertainment, while the Japanese version was released on September 19 by YGEX as the group's third physical Japanese single. The song was produced by 2NE1's long-time collaborator Teddy Park. Musically, "I Love You" is described as an affectionate, lush, and "moody synth" dance-pop track that infuses elements of electronic and traditional Korean trot music to create a "different sound" and "new genre of music", whilst still showing the beauty of Korean culture.

Upon release, "I Love You" garnered positive reviews from music critics, with them complimenting the song's production and composition along with the unique musical styles. It was ranked within the top five on Billboard magazine's list of Best K-pop Songs of 2012 and was further included on their list of 100 Greatest K-Pop Songs of the 2010s in November 2019.

The song was a commercial success in South Korea, topping both the Gaon Digital Chart and the Billboard K-pop Hot 100. It went on to sell more than 2.7 million digital units by the end of the year, standing as one of the best-selling singles in the country in 2012. In Japan, the song peaked at number five on the Oricon Singles Chart and sold 15,700 physical copies. It was included on the set list of the group's first worldwide concert tour, the New Evolution Global Tour (2012), where the group embarked on in late July.

== Background and release ==
In a StarNews article published on May 21, 2012, an official from YG Entertainment revealed that 2NE1 had recorded seven new songs produced by Teddy Park and planned to release a new Korean album in mid-June. After a month with no news, however, YG announced via YG Life on June 29 that 2NE1 would make a comeback with a new single titled "I Love You" on July 5, 2012, marking their first Korean language single since "Ugly" in a year. The agency also announced initial plans for the release of a new single every three weeks, leading up to a new album. "I Love You" was subsequently released for digital download and streaming as a single on July 5. The song was produced by Teddy Park, who had worked on many of 2NE1's previous material—including "Fire" (2009), "Go Away" (2010) and "I Am the Best" (2011)—and was co-written by Park and Lydia Paek.

The Japanese version of the single was first made available digitally on August 29, 2012 in Japan and was subsequently released as the group's third Japanese CD single on September 19 through YGEX—a joint venture between YG Entertainment and Avex. The Japanese lyrics were co-written by Keisuke, Tatsuji Ueda, Sunny Boy and Izumi Soratani. It was physically distributed in two formats: a CD-only regular edition and a CD + DVD limited edition bundle. "I Love You" was later included on the Japanese edition of 2NE1's third studio album titled Crush, which was released nearly two years later on June 25, 2014.

== Composition and lyrics ==
"I Love You" (Korean version)
A 22-second sample of "I Love You", which infuses melodic trot with dance-pop and electronic to create a unique and "new genre" of music.

Musically, "I Love You" was described as an affectionate, lush, and "moody synth" dance-pop number that combines elements of electronic and traditional Korean trot music instrumentals to create a "different sound" and a "new genre of music" contrasting with the styles the group has explored in the past. The song is composed in the key of C minor with a tempo of 125 beats per minute, and has a length of 3:57. In a press release, YG Entertainment stated that, "Since their debut, they have always done hip-hop, electronic, reggae and R&B. It was time for them to challenge themselves and try something new." The incorporation of oriental trot instrumentation in the song is a reference to the genre being considered the earliest form of Korean popular music—dating back to the era of Korea under Japanese rule, and became the defining element of the Korean music scene throughout the 1900s. Lyrically, "I Love You" is a confession song, with the songwriting depicting the emotions and confusion of a strong and independent, yet inexperienced, woman falling in love; as the members sing: "Don't get obsessed / Don't make me jealous / I'm still afraid of love / Give me faith like this." In an interview with Star News, CL elaborated on the song's musical direction, saying:

"We have always tried to mix different genres, whether it be rock or acoustic or hip-hop. This time it's like trot. Japan has 'enka' music, and it seems to resonate well with the emotions. Since there is no such genre in the United States, I think it will feel fresh. We want to show the beauty of Korean culture through us."

== Critical reception ==
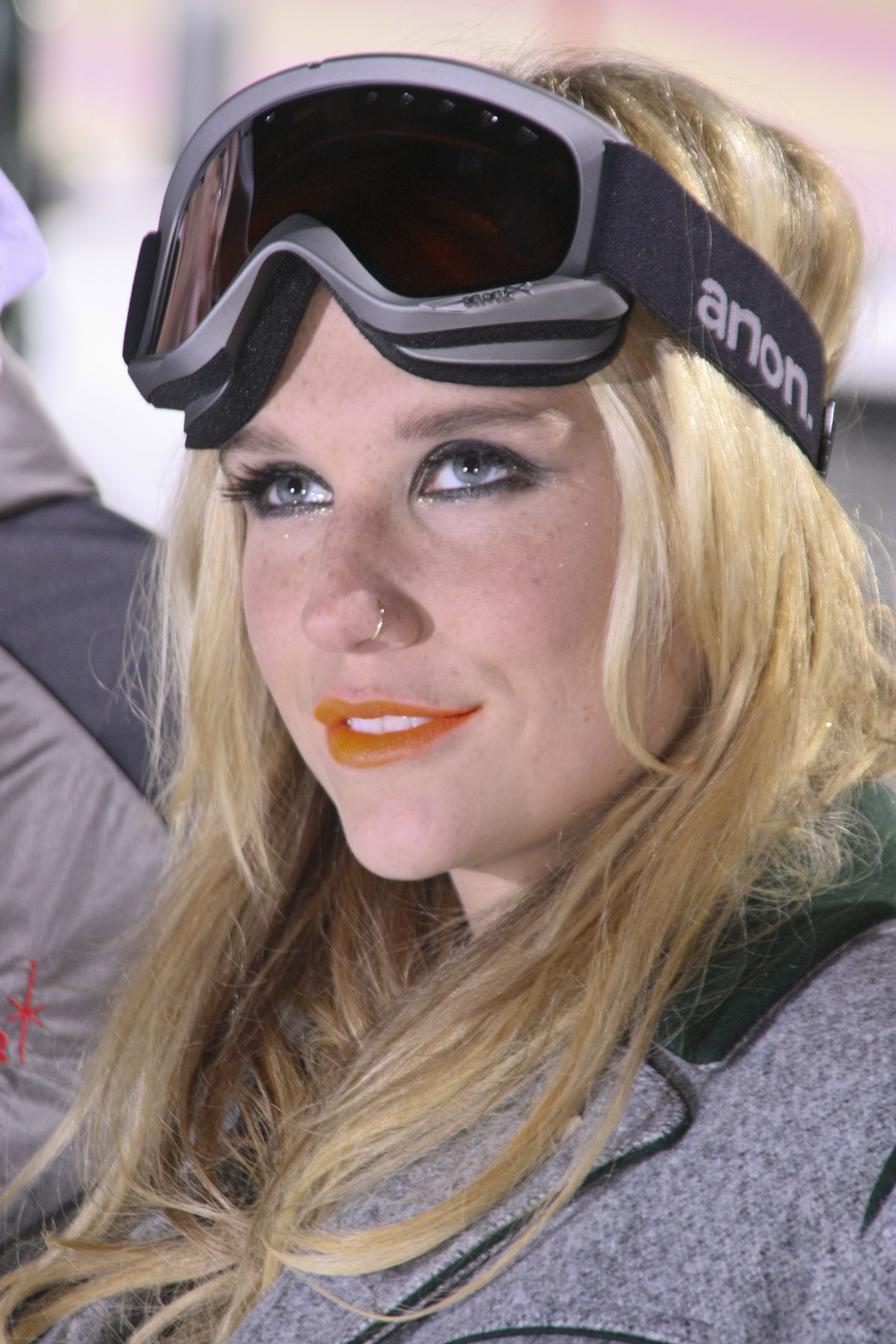
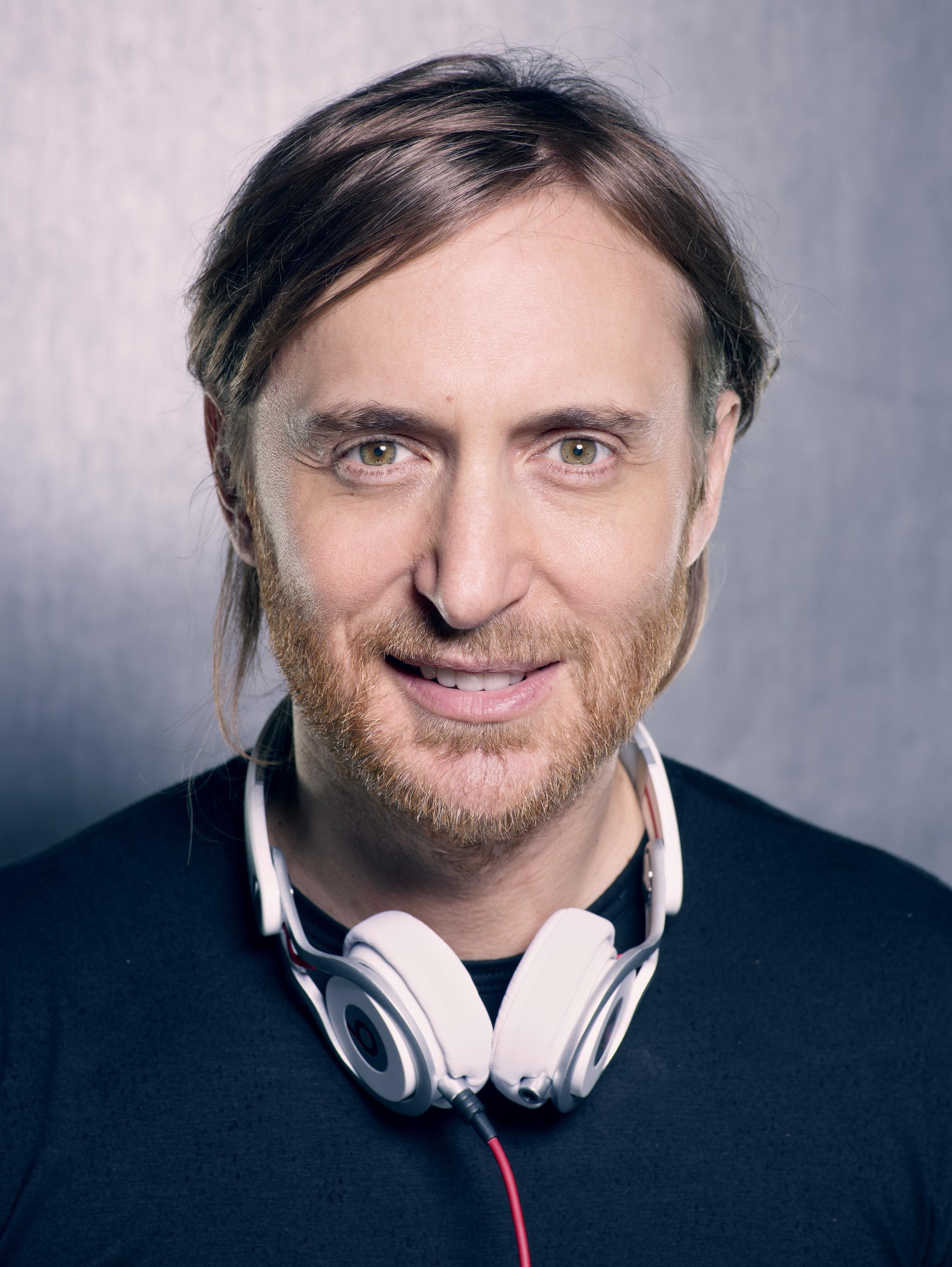
Spin compared "I Love You" to music by Kesha (left) and David Guetta (right).

The song was met with positive reviews from music critics. Christopher Weingarten of Spin stated that the song was a "perfect summation of pop's present and future", and compared the production to that of David Guetta, especially the use of synths and "ghostly" background vocals, while also comparing the rap-style vocals to those of American singer Kesha. Korean webzine IZM noted how the song structurally deviates from common hook songs, and said that "the more you listen, the more new things are discovered".

Kazumi Nanba from Rolling Stone Japan observed that although the track was less energetic than their previous singles, it showed off the members' natural vocal abilities, adding that "The level of quality is more than enough". Owen Myers of Popjustice praised the song's composition and ranked "I Love You" as the best K-pop single of 2012, writing that "it combines the best bits of pop into a rarefied cavalcade of amazingness".

Billboard magazine listed "I Love You" number four in their list of 20 Best K-Pop Songs of year in December 2012, complementing the song's composition and the group's vocal delivery. Jeff Benjamin of the same publication praised the song's musical style, saying "in the last 30 seconds, the cut flips on itself for an all-out, punky-party jam that only the most formidable of pop acts could successfully pull off". They further ranked the song number 67 on their 100 Greatest K-Pop Songs of the 2010s list in November 2019, referring to it as one of 2NE1's finest works, and praised the "brilliance of [the song's] complexity".

== Awards ==
"I Love You" was nominated for multiple awards, including Digital Daesang at the 27th Golden Disc Awards, but lost to "Gangnam Style" by labelmate Psy. "I Love You" won the Digital Bonsang award at the same event and Song of the Year for July 2012 at the 2nd Gaon Chart Music Awards (then referred to as "K-Pop Awards"), at the Olympic Hall on February 13.

Awards and nominations for "I Love You"
Organization	Year	Award	Result	Ref.
Mnet Asian Music Awards	2012	Best Female Group	Nominated	
Mnet Asian Music Awards	2012	Best Global Group – Female	Nominated	
Gaon Chart K-pop Awards	2013	Song of the Year – July	Won	
Golden Disc Awards	2013	Digital Bonsang (Main Prize)	Won	
Golden Disc Awards	2013	Digital Daesang	Nominated	
Myx Music Awards	2013	Favorite K-pop Video	Nominated	
Seoul Music Awards	2013	Bonsang Award	Won	

== Commercial performance ==
Upon the song's release, it topped all South Korean daily charts, including Melon and Mnet, and achieved an all-kill. The song debuted at number one on the Billboard K-pop Hot 100, becoming the group's first number-one single on the chart. During its debut week, the song reached the number two position on the Gaon Digital Chart, placing behind "Loving U" by Sistar. During its second week, "I Love You" reached the top position on the Gaon Digital Chart, becoming the group's sixth number-one single, and sold over 950,000 digital units after 11 days. In its third charting week, "I Love You" descended to number 3, selling another 403,000 downloads, and became the best-selling song of July 2012. By the end of the year, "I Love You" sold over 2.7 million digital units in the country, and was ranked as the eleventh best-selling song on the year-end component download chart. Factoring in streaming figures and instrumental/ringtone downloads, the song landed at number six for best-performing songs overall in South Korea on the year-end Gaon Digital Chart issue for 2012.

Elsewhere, in the United States, "I Love You" peaked at number three on the Billboard US World Digital Song Sales chart. On the chart's year-end issue, it was ranked as the thirteenth most downloaded foreign-language/international song in the US. In Japan, the song reached number three on the daily Oricon Singles Chart and number five on the chart's weekly counterpart in the week ending on October 1, and sold 15,700 physical copies in the country by the end of the year.

== Music video and live performances ==
The first teaser for the song's music video was released on July 1, 2012, which composed a clip of Dara and Minzy singing snippets of their verses. It was followed up with similar teasers featuring CL and Bom singing their verses on July 2 and 3, respectively. On July 4, 2012, a 25-second teaser was uploaded, featuring all of the members as well as showcasing the song's full chorus. "Slowly transitioning from space-pop styling to a more glamorous affair," as Bradley Stern writes, the members pose and pout on beds while showing off unique and intricate nail designs and looks. It garnered more than 1 million views within 17 hours of being released. The dance practice video for the song was uploaded to 2NE1's YouTube channel on July 10, 2012, which was recorded by YG Entertainment's founder Yang Hyun-suk.

"I Love You" premiered on television with the group's performance on SBS' Inkigayo on July 8, 2012. During the intro performance, CL rapped a verse from the then-unknown track "Falling in Love" in English with a parrot on her shoulder, which would be released as their next single exactly one year later. For "I Love You", the stage additionally incorporated live swans for decorations; the use of live animals for the performance stirred controversy amongst netizens as some felt that it was "borderline animal cruelty". Their agency subsequently apologized for the insensitive gesture. 2NE1 included "I Love You" in the set list for their first worldwide concert tour titled "New Evolution" where they embarked on later that month, which is considered to be the first worldwide tour and first American solo arena tour by a K-pop girl group.

Following the Japanese release of "I Love You" on September 19, 2012, it was chosen as the official accompanying track for 2NE1's Maybelline New York endorsement campaign in Japan, which provided the theme song to one of the cosmetics company's newly launched mascara lines. On October 18, 2012, 2NE1 performed the song along with "I Am the Best" at the K-Pop Collection in Okinawa, which was broadcast on November 1. At the SBS K-Pop Super Concert in Irvine, California on November 10, the song was part of the group's set. At year-end award shows and festivals, they performed the song at the annual Melon Music Awards on December 14, SBS Gayo Daejeon on December 29, and the MBC Gayo Daejejeon two days later. They again performed the song at the 22nd Seoul Music Awards on January 31, 2013.

== Track listing ==
Digital download – Korean version
No.	Title	Lyrics	Music	Length
1.	"I Love You" (아이 러브 유; Ai Leobeu Yoo)	Teddy Park, Lydia Paek	Teddy	3:57
Total length:				3:57

CD single – Japanese version
No.	Title	Lyrics	Music	Length
1.	"I Love You"	Teddy, Keisuke, Tatsuji Ueda, Sunny Boy, Izumi Soratani	Teddy	3:57
2.	"I Love You (Instrumental)"		Teddy	3:57
Total length:				7:54

Limited Edition DVD – Japanese version
No.	Title	Length
1.	"I Love You PV" (Video Clip)
2.	"I Love You PV" (Making Clip)
3.	"The Vacation in Philippines" (Off shot footage recorded in the Philippines)

== Credits and personnel ==
Credits adapted from Melon.

- 2NE1 – primary vocals
- Teddy Park – lyricist, composer, arranger
- Lydia Paek – composer

== Charts ==
=== Weekly charts ===
Weekly chart performance for "I Love You"
Chart (2012)	Peak position
Japan (Japan Hot 100)	29
Japan (Oricon)	5
Japan Adult Contemporary (Billboard)	51
South Korea (Gaon)	1
South Korea (K-pop Hot 100)	1
US World Digital Songs (Billboard)	3

=== Monthly charts ===
Monthly chart performance
Chart (2012)	Peak position
South Korea (Gaon)	1

=== Year-end charts ===
Year-end chart positions for "I Love You"
Chart (2012)	Position
South Korea (Gaon)	6
South Korea (K-pop Hot 100)	10
US World Digital Songs (Billboard)	13

== Release history ==
Release dates and formats for "I Love You"
Region	Date	Format(s)	Version	Distributor	Ref.
Various	July 5, 2012	Digital download; streaming	Korean version	YG Entertainment	
Japan	August 29, 2012	Digital download; streaming	Japanese version	Avex Group	
Japan	September 19, 2012	CD single	Japanese version	Avex Group	
Japan	September 19, 2012	CD + DVD	Japanese version	Avex Group	
