= Do You Love Me (2NE1 song) =

Single by 2NE1
- Released: August 7, 2013
- Recorded: 2012
- Genre: K-pop; electro house
- Length: 3:35
- Label: YG; KT Music
- Songwriter: Teddy Park
- Producer: Teddy Park

2NE1 singles chronology
"Falling in Love" (2013)	"Do You Love Me" (2013)	"Missing You" (2013)

"Do You Love Me" is a song by South Korean girl group 2NE1, released on August 7, 2013 by YG Entertainment. Its music video was released the following day. The song, produced by YG Entertainment's main producer Teddy, was described as "very representative" of 2NE1's electro-pop style.

== Critical reception ==
Jeff Benjamin from Billboard referred to the song as a "throwaway single" that sounded "like a rehash of their earlier material". He remarked that the "single only highlighted a creative standstill 2NE1 was in at the time".

== Promotion ==
2NE1 appeared on Korean music shows M Countdown, Music Bank, and Inkigayo to perform the song live. Their live performance of "Do You Love Me" on KBS's Music Bank was their first on the show in three years since its entertainment agency ceased relationships with KBS following a dispute.

== Track listing ==
- Digital download / streaming
1. "Do You Love Me" – 3:35

== Charts ==
=== Weekly charts ===
Chart	Peak position
South Korea (Gaon)	3
South Korea (K-pop Hot 100)	2
US World Digital Songs (Billboard)	4

=== Year-end charts ===
Chart	Peak position
South Korea (K-pop Hot 100)	87

== Music program awards ==
Song	Program	Date
"Do You Love Me"	Mnet's M Countdown	August 15, 2013

== Release history ==
Country	Date	Label	Format
Various	August 7, 2013	YG Entertainment	Digital download
