= Falling in Love (2NE1 song) =

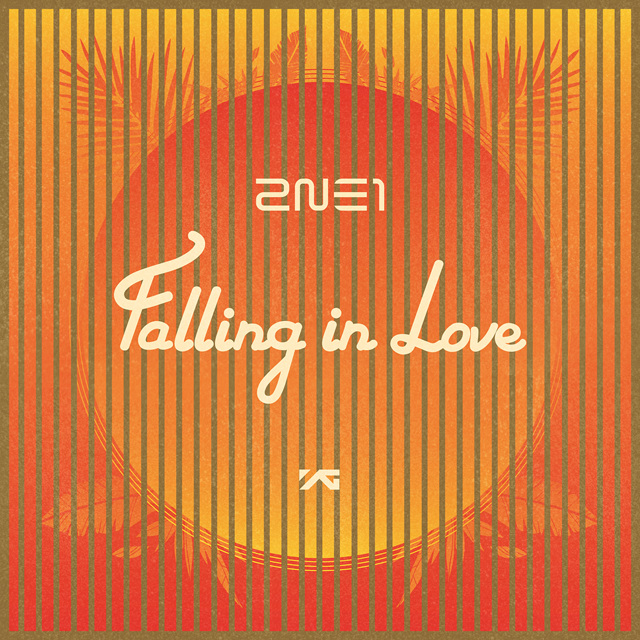

Single by 2NE1
- Language: Korean
- Released: July 8, 2013
- Recorded: 2012
- Genre: Reggae
- Length: 3:46
- Label: YG; KT Music
- Songwriters: Teddy Park; Choice37
- Producer: Teddy Park

2NE1 singles chronology
"I Love You" (2012)	"Falling in Love" (2013)	"Do You Love Me" (2013)

Music video
- "Falling in Love" on YouTube

"Falling in Love" is a song by South Korean girl group 2NE1, released on July 8, 2013, by YG Entertainment. The song was produced by the group's long-time collaborator Teddy, and was co-written by him and Choice37. Musically, "Falling in Love" is a reggae song that contains elements of trap music and dancehall. The music video was uploaded to the group's official YouTube channel the day before.

Commercially, the song topped the Gaon Digital Chart and sold over 885,000 digital units by the end of the year. In addition, it peaked at number three on the Korea K-pop Hot 100 and number four on the Billboard World Digital Songs chart.

== Background and release ==
A snippet of the track was first used as the intro of 2NE1's comeback stage for "I Love You" on SBS' Inkigayo a year prior on July 8, 2012, with CL rapping a verse in English. On June 18, 2013, YG Entertainment announced that the group would make a comeback in early July, making it the group's first release in a year, with the reggae-themed "Falling in Love" as the title. YG Entertainment CEO Yang Hyun-suk stated, "Although it is a new genre challenge, the unique colors and strengths of the group that 2NE1 has given are intact [sic]. It will be loved by enthusiasts and the public by adding work with new overseas choreographers." The agency also unveiled initial plans for the release of a new single every month leading up to a new album in October. The single was subsequently released for digital download and streaming on July 8, 2013, by YG Entertainment.

== Composition ==
"Falling in Love" was described as a relaxed and breezy summery track, incorporating elements of reggae, hip hop, and electronic music. It served as a change of pace from much of the group's previous works, containing a "rather slow but comfortable rhythm". Chris Martins of Spin wrote, "The beat combines sunny No Doubt-style pop with dancehall riddims and trap-rap effects." The song also references several of the group's previous singles, with CL rapping: “Yeah, in the club is getting ugly I don’t care / Can’t nobody stop the fire / let them haters sit and stare.”

== Music video and promotion ==
A still from the music video, showcasing the group performing the song on an artificial beach

The accompanying music video was uploaded to the group's official YouTube channel in conjunction with the release of the single, and reached more than one million views in less than a day. The video includes the members singing and performing the track's choreography on various sets, including luxurious Egyptian-themed palace with a swimming pool, a sandy beach, and a tropical-urban gold-embellished street with basketball courts. The music video was deemed a change of pace from the group's usual brash energy, and was considered more laid back and relaxed with a sense of urban flair. Model and actors Lee Soo-hyuk and Hong Jong-hyun made cameos in the video.

Promotions for the song featured 2NE1 appearing on various South Korean music programs during the month of July, including SBS' Inkigayo, Mnet's M Countdown, and MBC's Show! Music Core. The group was originally slated to make their comeback stage on Inkigayo on July 7, 2013, but the show was cancelled because of the Asiana Airlines Flight 214 crash that occurred the day before. The single instead debuted on M Countdown on July 11, 2013. The song received three first place music program wins during the course of its promotion.

== Reception ==
Commercially, the song debuted at number one on the Gaon Digital Chart, and sold 363,843 digital units within a week. The song peaked at number four on the US World Digital Song Sales chart for the week of July 26, 2013 and at number two on the Billboard K-pop Hot 100, making it the second top five hit for the group on the Korean Billboard chart. By the end of the year, the song sold over 885,000 digital units.

== Track listing ==
- Digital download / streaming
1. "Falling in Love" – 3:46

== Chart performance ==
=== Weekly charts ===
Chart (2013)	Peak position
South Korea (Gaon)	1
South Korea (K-pop Hot 100)	2
UK Indie Breakers (OCC)	12
US World Digital Song Sales (Billboard)	4

=== Monthly charts ===
Chart (2013)	Peak position
South Korea (Gaon)	4

=== Year-end charts ===
Chart (2013)	Position
South Korea (Gaon)	96
South Korea (K-pop Hot 100)	51
US World Digital Songs (Billboard)	24

== Accolades ==
Awards and nominations
Year	Organization	Award	Result	Ref.
2013	Mnet Asian Music Awards	Best Female Group	Nominated	
2013	MTV Iggy	Song of the Summer	Won	
2013	MTV Iggy	Song of the Year	Nominated	

Music program awards
Program	Date
M Countdown	July 18, 2013
Show! Music Core	July 20, 2013
Inkigayo	July 21, 2013

== Release history ==
Country	Date	Label	Format	Ref.
Various	July 8, 2013	YG Entertainment	Digital download; streaming	
