= Missing You (2NE1 song) =

Song by 2NE1

Single by 2NE1
- Released: November 21, 2013
- Recorded: 2013
- Genre: Pop
- Length: 3:39
- Label: YG
- Songwriter: Teddy Park
- Producer: Teddy Park

2NE1 singles chronology
"Do You Love Me" (2013)	"Missing You" (2013)	"Come Back Home" (2014)

Music video
- "Missing You" on YouTube

"Missing You" (Korean: 그리워해요; RR: Geuriwohaeyo) is a song by South Korean girl group 2NE1, released on November 21, 2013 by YG Entertainment. The song was produced and written entirely by long-time producer and collaborator Teddy. Commercially, "Missing You" debuted at number one on the Gaon Digital Chart and sold over 1 million digital units by the end of 2014.

== Background and release ==
Beginning on November 18, 2013, YG Entertainment began releasing individual teasers featuring each member singing a snippet from the track, leading up to its release on November 21, 2013.

A Japanese version for the song was later included in the group's Japanese edition of their second Korean studio album Crush, which was released on June 25, 2014. The track was also featured in the 2NE1 Best Collection -Korea Edition- compilation album, which was released by YGEX in December of the same year.

== Critical reception ==
The song received positive reviews from music critics. Jeff Benjamin of Billboard praised the song's musical styles—where he wrote, "While slow and tender at its core, the experimental track incorporates unexpected electronic flourishes and alien-like harmonies before its soaring guitar line brilliantly evolves into a pounding piano chords for the ladies to belt over." Pitchfork included "Missing You" in their list of 20 Essential K-pop Songs in August 2014, who lauded it as "one of the most vocally rich and structurally distinctive singles Korea’s ever produced". The music video also received attention from the press regarding CL's nude scene, with Billboard referring to it as a more sophisticated version of Miley Cyrus' "Wrecking Ball" music video, which was released just a couple months prior and also widely notable for unprecedented nudity.

== Commercial performance ==
"Missing You" was a commercial success, topping all South Korean daily charts and achieved an all-kill soon after release. In its opening week, the song landed at the top position on the Gaon Digital Chart and became the group's eighth number one single. In the month of November alone, the track sold 453,481 digital units and ranked as the ninth best-selling song of the month in the country. It went on to sell over 1,080,000 digital downloads by the end of 2014.

== Accolades ==
Awards and nominations for "Missing You"
Year	Organization	Award	Result	Ref.
2014	Golden Disc Awards	Digital Bonsang (Main Prize)	Won	
2014	Golden Disc Awards	Digital Daesang	Nominated	
2014	World Music Awards	World's Best Video	Nominated	

Music program awards
Program	Date	Ref.
M Countdown	November 28, 2013	
M Countdown	December 5, 2013	
Show! Music Core	November 30, 2013	
Inkigayo	December 1, 2013	
Inkigayo	December 8, 2013	

== Music video and promotion ==
The music video for "Missing You" premiered on November 21, 2013 at midnight KST (UTC+09:00) on 2NE1's official YouTube channel. It received more than 3 million views in less than two days. The members are depicted individually reminiscing over their previous relationships in solitary while navigating through a somber neutral-colored storage room-like setting, where at one point member CL is shown to be nude while recollecting her deep emotions. The members are shown to be united in the sense they share common sentiments of heartbreak. Regarding CL's nude scene, Billboard states "the video's talking point is undoubtedly when CL goes nude for a daring naked scene during the second chorus. The rapper/singer wistfully sits in a room of deteriorating cement, covering herself with only her arms and legs."

Promotions for the single debuted with 2NE1's performance at the 2013 Mnet Asian Music Awards in Hong Kong, which followed a remix of the group's 2011 track "Lonely". On November 24, 2NE1 began promoting the song on M! Countdown, Show! Music Core and Inkigayo, and received five first place awards. Music show promotions for the single concluded on SBS Inkigayo on December 22, 2013.

== Track listing ==
- Digital download / streaming
1. "그리워해요 (Missing You)" – 3:39

== Chart performance ==
=== Weekly charts ===
Chart (2013)	Peak position
South Korea (Gaon)	1
South Korea (K-pop Hot 100)	2
UK Indie Breakers (OCC)	14
US World Digital Songs (Billboard)	2

Chart (2024)	Peak position
South Korea Download (Circle)	134

=== Monthly charts ===
Chart (2013)	Peak position
South Korea (Gaon)	9

== Sales ==
Country	Sales
South Korea (digital)	1,083,310

== Release history ==
Release dates and formats
Region	Date	Format	Label	Ref.
Various	November 21, 2013	Digital download; streaming	YG Entertainment	
