= Lollipop (BigBang and 2NE1 song) =

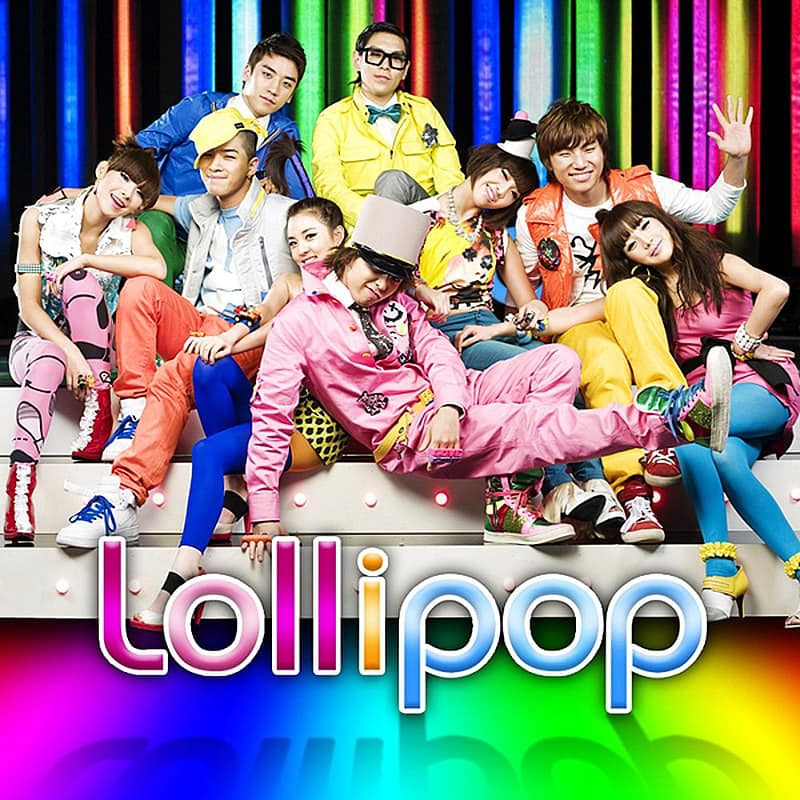

Promotional single by Big Bang and 2NE1

from the EP 2NE1
- Released: March 27, 2009
- Recorded: 2009
- Studio: YG Studio (Seoul)
- Genre: Dance-pop; bubblegum pop
- Length: 3:08
- Label: YG
- Songwriter: Teddy Park
- Producer: Teddy Park

Music video
- "Lollipop" on YouTube

"Lollipop" is a song by South Korean groups Big Bang and 2NE1, released under YG Entertainment on March 27, 2009. Created to promote a cellphone by LG Cyon, it interpolates the 1958 hit "Lollipop" written by Julius Dixson and Beverly Ross. The song achieved the top spot on various online charts, including a four week run at number one on music portal Mnet. "Lollipop" was used to debut 2NE1 unofficially, as it does not serve as their debut single. 2NE1 followed up with their official debut single "Fire".

== Background and release ==
"Lollipop"
A sample of 2NE1 and Big Bang's "Lollipop."

"Lollipop" was used to debut 2NE1 unofficially, as it does not serve as their debut single. In April, YG Entertainment announced that 2NE1 would release a hip hop and reggae song titled "Fire" on May 6, 2009, which would serve as their official debut as a group.

The song was used for an LG Cyon phone. It charted number one on various offline and online charts in South Korea, despite not having any promotional appearances. The song went to sell over 3,000,000 digital downloads and became a commercial success in South Korea, topping the Cyworld digital chart for the month of April 2009.

== Music video ==
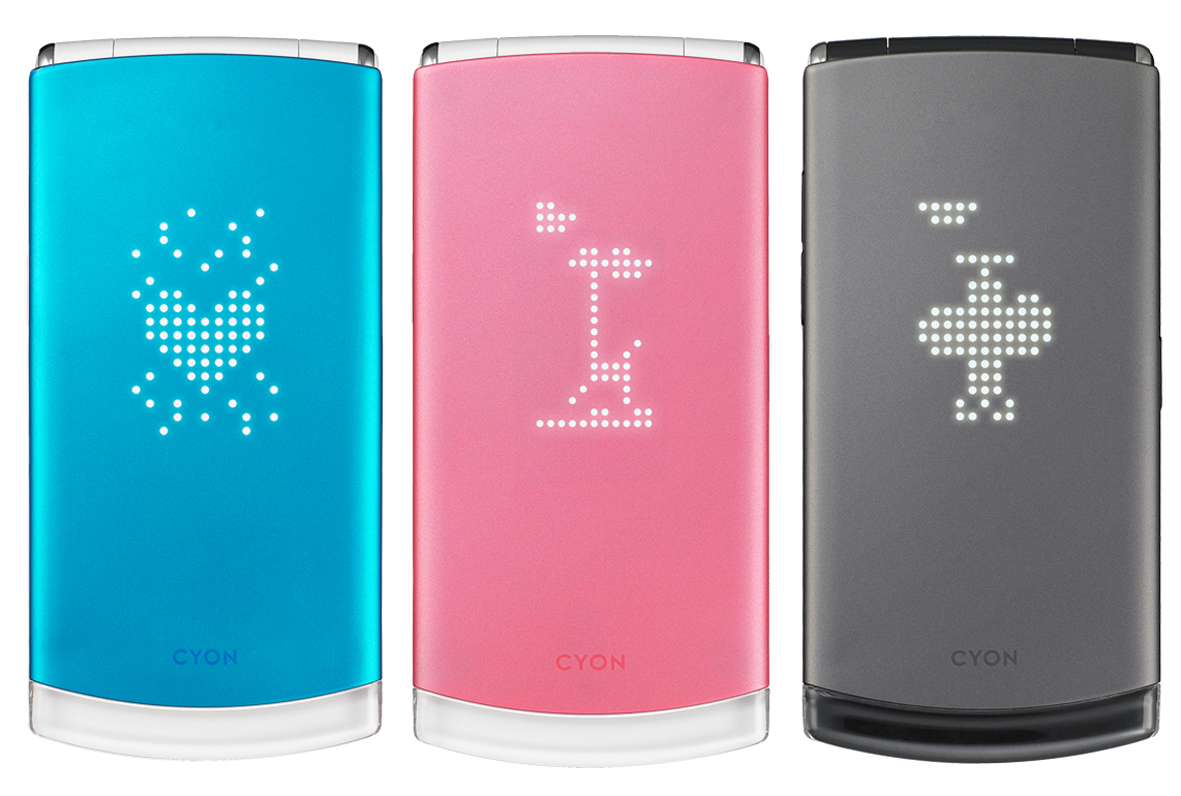
Models of the LG Cyon Lollipop cellphone

The video was filmed in the first week of March 2009. It premiered on March 28, 2009. The video shows both groups dancing together in rainbow and multi-colored shot. A behind-the-scenes version was premiered a few weeks later on May 2, 2009. The video was directed by Seo hyun-seung. On May 15, 2009, YG Entertainment's official YouTube uploaded the full music video.

The original video showed 2NE1 singing in front of a white screen for the intro, then introduces both BigBang and 2NE1 together in a color-changing room. Each is introduced in a solo act with the following rooms: T.O.P in a red or yellow room, G-Dragon in a pink or blue room, Dara in a purple room, CL in a purple or green room, Minzy in a pink room (later edited into a red room, as well), Taeyang in a blue or purple room, Seungri in a yellow or red room donning glasses, Daesung in a pink room, and Bom in a pink room (later edited into a blue room, as well).

An alternate version was later made that did not show the bit of 2NE1 in front of the white screen. Instead, it was replaced with Dara in her blue room, whereas she performed the verse. Other scenes were changed to include the promotion for the LG Cyon cell phone.

== Accolades ==
Awards and nominations
Year	Organization	Award	Result	Ref.
2009	Cyworld Digital Music Awards	Song of the Month (April)	Won	
2009	Melon Music Awards	Song of the Year	Nominated	
2009	Mnet 20's Choice Awards	Hot CF Star	Won	

== Track listing ==
Digital download / streaming

1. Lollipop – 3:08

== Credits and personnel ==
Credits adapted from the EP's liner notes.

Studio

- YG Studio – recording, mixing
- Sterling Sound – mastering

Personnel

- Big Bang – vocals
- 2NE1 – vocals
- Teddy Park – producer, songwriter
- Oh Young-taek – recording
- Lee Kyung-joon – recording
- Yang Hyun-suk – mixing, executive producer
- Tom Coyne – mastering

== Sales ==
Country	Sales
South Korea (digital)	3,000,000

== See also ==
- "Cabi Song", a 2010 promotional single by Girls' Generation and 2PM for Caribbean Bay
