= Fire (2NE1 song) =

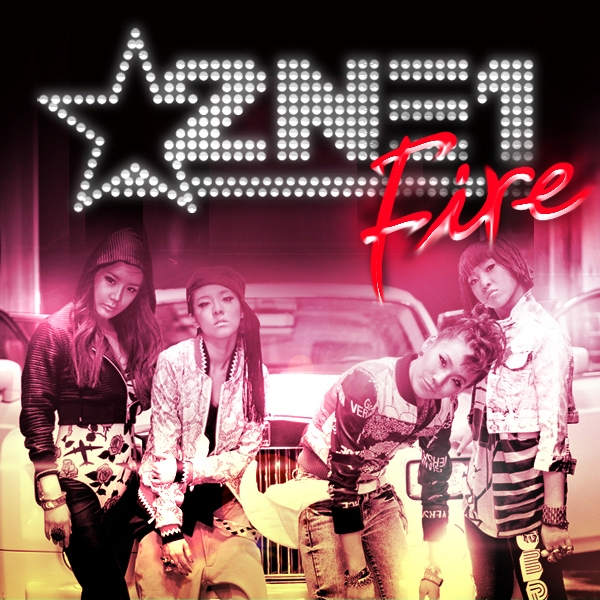
- Digital cover

Single by 2NE1

from the EP 2NE1
- Language: Korean
- Released: May 6, 2009
- Recorded: 2008–2009
- Genre: Electropop; hip-hop; Electro hop
- Length: 3:43
- Label: YG
- Songwriter: Teddy Park
- Producer: Teddy Park

2NE1 singles chronology
| "Fire" (2009) | "I Don't Care" (2009) |

Music video
- "Fire (Space ver.)" on YouTube "Fire (Street ver.)" on YouTube

"Fire" is the debut single by South Korean girl group 2NE1. YG Entertainment released the song to digital outlets on May 6, 2009, as the lead single for the group's self-titled debut extended play (2009). Despite the group having appeared alongside labelmate Big Bang for the promotional single "Lollipop" in March 2009, "Fire" served as 2NE1's official debut. The song nevertheless became a hit on all Korean charts following its release.

Critical reception towards "Fire" were positive, with a majority of the critics commending its production and the group's performance. Various critics have highlighted "Fire" for having helped start the "girl crush" trend in K-pop, a concept which revolves around themes of female empowerment and self-confidence. Melon included "Fire" at number 37 on their ranking of the top 100 K-pop songs of all time.

Two music videos were produced for "Fire", a space and a street version, which were directed by Seo Hyun-seung. The song's accolades include Best Music Video at the MAMA Awards, Song of the Month at the Cyworld Digital Music Awards, and Hot Online Song at the Mnet 20's Choice Awards.

== Background and release ==
"Fire" – 2NE1
A 20-second sample of 2NE1's "Fire".

2NE1 was first unveiled to the public on March 27, 2009 after appearing alongside labelmate BigBang for the LG Cyon promotional track "Lollipop". Despite the track not having any formal promotions on music shows, the song became a hit on all offline and online charts in South Korea. On April 30, 2009, CEO of YG Entertainment Yang Hyun-suk revealed that 2NE1's debut song would consist of a hip-hop and reggae concept, to be released via digital download and streaming on May 6, 2009. The song, titled "Fire", was written and produced by 1TYM's Teddy Park, and gives a "strong and sophisticated feeling". Short clips of the song were teased on the group's official website at the beginning of May.

"Fire" was released as planned on May 6, with two versions of the music video released the same day — a "space" version and a "street" version.Both of the music videos received over one million views in a day; the viewcount then quickly increased to two million. The videos were profiled on Perez Hilton's blog.

== Reception ==
=== Critical reception ===
Writing for webzine IZM, Lee Jong-min said that "'Fire' produced a more evolved image than the previous scene created by the agency", and added that its use of synthesizers and heavy bass sounded like something out of a martial arts movie, generating power that surprises watchers. The publication further wrote that "the development of one or two melodic variations and the electronic sound that dominates the entire song cleverly mixes the hip-hop attitude with club scene musical trends." They named "Fire" one of the best singles of 2009—the only song from an idol group in the list. In webzine Weiv's year-end feature ranking the best singles of the year, critic Kim Min-young ranked the song number three while Choi Min-woo ranked it number four on their individual year-end listings.

Retrospectively, Jeff Benjamin of Billboard ranked it the 14th best single in the group's discography, complimenting the group's charisma in addition to the track's "exciting" and "twinkling synthesizers", and wrote that it "set the groundwork for much of the act's future singles -- catchy electro-pop bangers with loads of attitude."

=== Public reception ===
Both the song and the group have been very popular online, with the song topping Mnet's online chart and the group's name becoming a top search term. The group was also rewarded with three Cyworld Digital Music Awards, with both "Lollipop" and "Fire" winning "Song of the Month" awards and the group winning "Rookie of the Month" for May 2009.

== Awards ==
Awards and nominations for "Fire"
| Year | Organization | Award | Result | Ref. |
|---|---|---|---|---|
| 2009 | Cyworld Digital Music Awards | Song of the Month – May | Won | |
| 2009 | Cyworld Digital Music Awards | Rookie of the Month – May | Won | |
| 2009 | Golden Disc Awards | Digital Song Bonsang | Nominated | |
| 2009 | Melon Music Awards | Song of the Year | Nominated | |
| 2009 | Mnet 20's Choice Awards | Hot Online Song | Won | |
| 2009 | Mnet Asian Music Awards | Best Music Video | Won | |
| 2009 | Mnet Asian Music Awards | Best Composition (Note: Teddy Park was credited as nominee) | Won | |
| 2010 | Myx Music Awards | Favorite International Video Award | Nominated | |

Music program awards
| Program | Date | Ref. |
|---|---|---|
| Inkigayo | June 14, 2009 | |
| Inkigayo | June 21, 2009 | |

== Music video and promotion ==
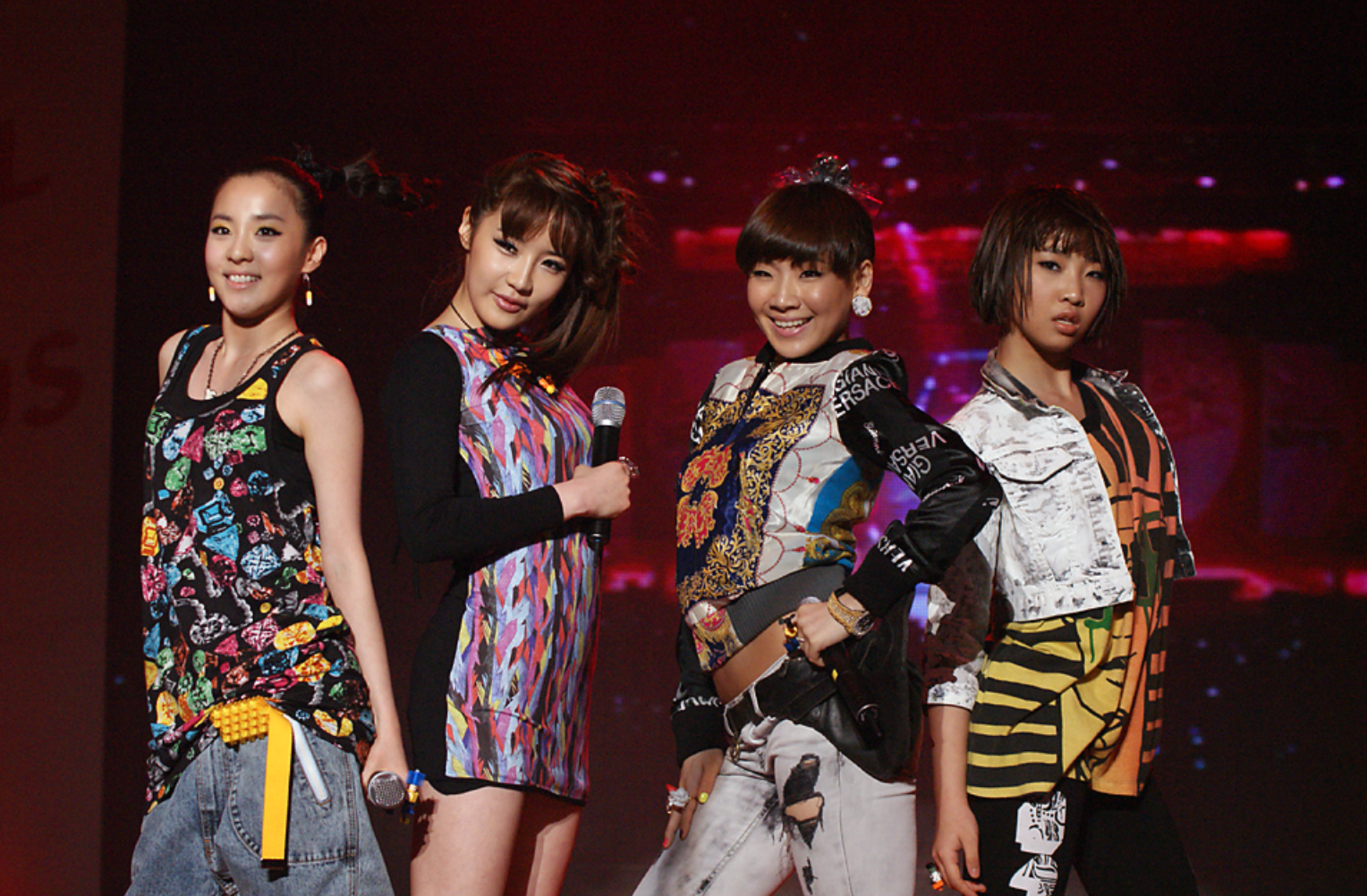
2NE1 performing the song at 34th & 35th Cyworld Digital Music Awards

The "Space" version of the music video showcases 2NE1 performing the song in Space. During the intro, CL is also seen wearing Beats by Dr. Dre headphones. The "Street" version of the music video features 2NE1 performing "Fire" on an abandoned street at night. The video also features a cameo appearance by G-Dragon of Big Bang. Both versions of the music video were filmed in secret during April 2009. The music videos were released May 6, 2009, both being directed by Seo Hyun-seung. Both versions were uploaded on YG's official YouTube account on August 17, 2009. The space version has since accumulated over 52 million views on the platform. A behind the scenes video was released May 10, 2009.

The group's first performance of the song was on May 17, 2009, on SBS's Inkigayo, beginning the group's activities. The performance was featured on Perez Hilton's blog, once again showing his interest towards the group. 2NE1 went on to win two "Mutizen" awards from the music program; their first win on June 14 set a record at the time for the fastest group to receive a music show win—just 39 days after their debut. Both of the official music videos were uploaded in HD on the YouTube channel of 2NE1 on September 6, 2010.

== Covers and usage in media ==
At the 2009 KBS Entertainment Awards, various comedians performed a parody of "Fire" on stage. On a 2 Days & 1 Night episode aired on February 28, 2010, MC Mong, Lee Soo-geun, Kim Jong-min and Kim C dressed up as the 2NE1 members and performed a parody of "Fire". While filming the drama Wife Returns in 2010, actress Yoon Se-ah mentioned that she would often listen to "Fire" on set as it helped refine her character in the drama. During the first season of survival show Produce 101 in 2016, the song was performed by multiple trainee groups as one of the debut song missions. It was also used as one of the mission songs in the 2017 drama The Idolmaster KR.

During the first season of Mnet's Queendom in 2019, (G)I-dle performed a cover of "Fire" as part of the show's cover segment. Following the episode's broadcast, group leader Soyeon commented how she felt honored to cover the song as she looked up to 2NE1 since she was young. After Woo!ah! covered the song in 2021, a member of the group expressed that they aspire to grow as an artist like 2NE1. In the 2021 series Work Later, Drink Now, Lee Sun-bin, Han Sun-hwa, and Jung Eun-ji's characters performed a cover of "Fire" inside a bar. During a January 2022 episode of Saturday Night Live Korea, all three of them served as hosts and opened the show by reenacting the cover.

In February 2023, Everglow covered the song at the 30th Anniversary Hanteo Music Awards. During the final episode of Babymonster's Last Evaluation show chronicling the group's selection process, "Fire" was performed as part of a "2NE1 mash-up" that served as the show's last mission prior to the group's debut. In November 2023, Kiss of Life covered "Fire" at a concert in Busan.

At the 2024 MBC Gayo Daejejeon, broadcast on January 29, 2025, members of the South Korean variety program Earth Arcade — Ahn Yu-jin (IVE), Lee Young-ji, Mimi (Oh My Girl), and comedian Lee Eun-ji — performed a special stage covering "Fire" along with "I Am the Best." The performance featured altered lyrics referencing Earth Arcade and was noted for its choreography and humorous presentation.

== Legacy ==
In 2014, webzine Music Y included "Fire" in their list of 120 greatest dance tracks of all-time: music critic Hong Hyuk-soo wrote that "Fire" may have been a kind of feminism that revolted against the music market that goes back and forth between innocence and sexy; "a gesture of one-dimensional rebellion against the social convention that says, 'Because you are a woman, you have to be careful.'" South China Morning Post's Patti Sunio hailed the "instant hit" as the track "that broke the cutesy clean-cut look typical of girl groups." In 2020, Globe Telecom named "Fire" one of the most iconic K-pop music videos, saying that the "bold video style coupled with the pulsing synths made a refreshing addition to the existing lineup of bubblegum pop female acts."

"Fire" was ranked number 37 in Melon and newspaper Seoul Shinmun's 2021 list of Top K-pop Songs of All Time, with music critic Squib writing that the flame of the "new evolution" that "Fire" ignited can be still seen in the genealogy of girl groups that claim strong images in the present, ranging from 4Minute to most recently Blackpink and Itzy. Insider named it one of the best debut songs of all time in K-pop, writing that it "opens with one of the most iconic spoken lines in any K-pop track". Billboard Brasil expressed that "Fire" helped "change the history of the genre and how the South Korean music industry viewed a female group".

== Track listing ==
Digital download / streaming

1. "Fire" – 3:43

== Release history ==
Release dates and formats for "Fire"
| Region | Date | Format | Label(s) | Ref. |
|---|---|---|---|---|
| Various | May 6, 2009 | Digital download; streaming | YG Entertainment | |
