= Top Gear =

Top Gear may refer to:

- "Top gear", the highest gear available in a vehicle's manual transmission

== Television ==
- Top Gear (1977 TV series), a British motoring magazine programme
- Top Gear (2002 TV series), a relaunched version of the original show
- Top Gear (2011 TV series), a Chinese adaptation
- Top Gear (2014 TV series), another Chinese adaptation
- Top Gear (American TV series), 2010–2016
- Top Gear America, 2017–2022
- Top Gear Australia, 2008–2012, 2024-
- Top Gear France, from 2015
- Top Gear Italia, 2016
- Top Gear Korea, from 2011
- Top Gear Russia, 2009

== Other uses ==
- Top Gear (magazine), a British magazine based on the TV show
- Top Gear (radio programme), BBC radio music programme 1964–1975
- Top Gear (retailer), clothes boutique of the 1960s in London
- Top Gear (video game series)
  - Top Gear (video game), for the Super Nintendo Entertainment System

== See also ==
- Propulsion transmission
