= 2009 Mnet Asian Music Awards =

Music awards in Seoul, South Korea

- Date: November 21, 2009
- Location: Seoul Sports Complex, Seoul, South Korea
- Hosted by: Tiger JK
- Most awards: 2NE1 (3)
- Most nominations: 2NE1 (4)
- Website: Mnet Asian Music Awards

Television/radio coverage
- Network: South Korea: Mnet; Japan: Mnet Japan; SEA Countries: Channel V China:Zhejiang Satellite TV
- Runtime: around 200 minutes

The 2009 Mnet Asian Music Awards (MAMA) was the eleventh of the annual music awards in Seoul, South Korea that took place on November 21, 2009, at the Seoul Sports Complex.

Newcomer girl group 2NE1 lead the nominations with 4 counts, followed by label-mate G-Dragon, soloist Baek Ji-young, and boy group 2PM with 3 each. At the end of the ceremony, 2NE1 received the most wins with 3 out of 4 including the Song of the Year daesang award. Next to them was boy and girl groups 2PM and Brown Eyed Girls respectively with 2 wins.

== Background ==
After ten years of holding the event under the name "M.net Korean Music Festival" (MKMF), the award-ceremony started to have a new name called "M.net Asian Music Awards" or simply "MAMA". This marked a change in concept and the way they will handle how people may vote for which artists win the awards. With its slogan "Asian Wave", MAMA was broadcast live in China, Japan, Hong Kong and Southeast Asia through Channel V International.

A VTR of artists congratulating the event was also shown including Janet Jackson, Nicole Scherzinger, Lady Gaga, Black Eyed Peas, Mai Kuraki, and Ludacris. Taiwanese artists Ming Dao, future Miss A member Wang Feifei, and Sarah also presented an award, which was broadcast live in Taiwan.

== Performances ==
The following individuals and groups, listed in order of appearance, performed musical numbers at the ceremony.

Name(s)	Performed	Notes
Tiger JK of Drunken Tiger	"Monster"	1st Wave: Asian Fever
Brown Eyed Girls and Kara ft. Dr. Core 911	"Sign", "Honey", "Step", and "Abracadabra remix	2nd Wave: Girls X Girls
Superstar K1's Seo In-guk ft. Baek Ji-young, Hyun Jyu-nim and MFM Church Choir	"Don't Forget Me", "Boom Boom Pow", "Calling You"	3rd Wave: Super Stardom
AKB48	"River"	Best Asia Recommended Award (Japan) awardee
2NE1	"I Don't Care", "Kiss", "You and I", "Please Don't Go"	4th Wave: '21st Street' a Musical
Dae Ijin, Park Jae-eun, Kim Juwang, Gil Hakmi, Jo Moon geun, Park Taejin, Jeong Seon-guk, Park Narae, and Park Semi ft. Yoon Jong-shin and Hareem	"Today More Than Yesterday", "Love Rain", "Love... That Guy", "After Love", "Like Being Shot By A Bullet"	R&B Performances
Miryo, Ha Joo Yun, Hyuna, Jeon Ji-yoon, and Yoon Mi-rae (T)	"Lip Gloss", "Pay Day"	5th Wave: Free to the Women
Ivy ft. Nichkhun, 2PM ft. Park Jin-young (JYP)	"Touch Me", "Heartbeat", "Again & Again"	6th Wave: World Of Temptation
4Minute and Lollipop F	"Muzik", "I Am Legend"	
G-Dragon and Taeyang	"Heartbreaker", "Wedding Dress", "Where U At", "Korean Dream"	7th Wave: Korean Dream
Seo In Young, Kim Tae-woo, Epik High, Shim Soo-bong	"That Person of that Time", "I Love You All I Know", "1 Million Roses"	8th Wave: That Person of that Time

== Winners and nominees ==
Winners are listed first and highlighted in boldface.

Song of the Year (daesang)	Album of the Year (daesang)
**2NE1 – "I Don't Care"**; List of longlisted nominees: 2NE1 – "Fire"; Girls' Generation – "Gee"; Super Junior – "Sorry, Sorry"; Brown Eyed Girls – "Abracadabra"; 2PM – "Again & Again"; Kara – "Honey"; G-Dragon – "Heartbreaker"; Son Dam-bi – "Saturday Night"; Clazziquai – "Love Again"; Seo Taiji – "Juliet"; DnG – "Step 2 Me"; Leessang – "Girl Who Can't Break Up, Guy Who Can't Leave" (ft. Jung-in); Bada – "Mad"; SS501 – "Because I'm Stupid"; Baek Ji-young – "Don't Forget"; Lee Seung-chul – "No More Love Like This"; T-max – "Paradise"; Tiffany – "I'm Alone"; 4Minute – "Muzik"; Kim Tae-woo – "Love Rain"; Kim Jong-kook – "Today More Than Yesterday"; Bobby Kim – "Love... That Guy"; Park Hyo-shin – "After Love"; Baek Ji-young – "Like Being Shot By A Bullet"; Hong Jin-young – "Love Battery"; Seong Jin-yoo – "Fit Perfectly"; Park Hyun-bin – "Brilliant Life"; Wink – "Embarrassed"; Joo Hyun-mi & Seohyun – "Jjarajajja"; Dynamic Duo – "Guilty"; Tiger JK – "Monster"; Outsider – "Loner"; Epik High – "Wannabe" (ft. Mellow); Boohwal – "Thought"; Kiha & The Faces – "Living Without Incidents"; Cherry Filter – "Pianissimo"; F.T. Island – "I Wish"	**G-Dragon – Heartbreaker**
Artist of the Year (daesang)	Best Music Video
**2PM**; List of longlisted nominees: 2NE1; G-Dragon; Supreme Team; Beast; MBLAQ; Chungrim; Taegoon; After School; T-ara; 4Minute; f(x); Big Bang; Super Junior; SG Wannabe; SS501; Brown Eyed Girls; Davichi; Girls' Generation; Jewelry; Kara; Tiger JK; Rain; Lee Seung-chul; MC Mong; Baek Ji-young; Bada; Son Dam-bi; Younha; Chae Yeon; 8Eight; Roo'ra; Koyote; Cool; Clazziquai	**2NE1 – "Fire"**; DnG – "Step 2 Me"; Leessang – "Girl Who Can't Break Up, Guy Who Can't Leave" (ft. Jung-in); Bada – "Mad"; Seo Taiji – "Juliet"
Best New Male Artists	Best New Female Artists
**Supreme Team**; Beast; MBLAQ; Chungrim; Taegoon	**2NE1**; After School; T-ara; 4Minute; f(x)
Best Male Group	Best Female Group
**2PM**; Big Bang; Super Junior; SG Wannabe; SS501	**Brown Eyed Girls**; Davichi; Girls' Generation; Jewelry; Kara
Best OST	Best Dance
**SS501 – "Because I'm Stupid" (Boys Over Flowers)**; Baek Ji-young – "Don't Forget" (Iris); Lee Seung-chul – "No More Love Like This" (Blue Love Story); T-max – "Paradise" (Boys Over Flowers); Tiffany – "I'm Alone" (Ja Myung Go)	**Kara – "Honey"**; 2NE1 – "I Don't Care"; 2PM – "Again & Again"; Girls' Generation – "Gee"; Super Junior – "Sorry, Sorry"
Best Male Solo Artist	Best Female Solo Artist
**Tiger JK**; Rain; Lee Seung-chul; G-Dragon; MC Mong	**Baek Ji-young**; Bada; Son Dam-bi; Younha; Chae Yeon
Best Ballad R&B	Best Rock
**Kim Tae-woo – "Love Rain"**; Kim Jong-kook – "Today More Than Yesterday"; Bobby Kim – "Love... That Guy"; Park Hyo-shin – "After Love"; Baek Ji-young – "Like Being Shot By A Bullet"	**Boohwal – "Thought"**; Seo Taiji – "Juliet"; Kiha & The Faces – "Living Without Incidents"; Cherry Filter – "Pianissimo"; F.T. Island – "I Wish"
Best Hip Hop	Best House & Electronic
**Leessang – "Girl Who Can't Break Up, Guy Who Can't Leave" (ft. Jung-in)**; Dynamic Duo – "Guilty"; Tiger JK of Drunken Tiger – "Monster"; Outsider – "Loner"; Epik High – "Wannabe" (ft. Mellow)	**Brown Eyed Girls – "Abracadabra"**; Son Dam-bi – "Saturday Night"; Clazziquai – "Love Again"; 4Minute – "Muzik"; G-Dragon – "Heartbreaker"
Best Trot	Best Mixed Gender Group
**Hong Jin-young – "Love Battery"**; Seong Jin-yoo – "Fit Perfectly"; Park Hyun-bin – "Brilliant Life"; Wink – "Embarrassed"; Joo Hyun-mi & Seohyun – "Jjarajajja"	**8Eight**; Roo'ra; Koyote; Cool; Clazziquai

Special awards

- Best Asia Star Award: **TVXQ** (received by JYJ)
- Best Asian Composer Award: **Park Jin-young (JYP)** – "Nobody"
- Hall of Fame Award: **Shim Soo-bong**
- Asia Recommended Award: **AKB48**; **Lollipop F**
- Lyricist Award: **Park Seon-ju** – "Love Him" by Bobby Kim
- Best Composition Award: **Teddy** – "Fire" & " I Don't Care"
- Arrangement Award: **Shinsadong Tiger** – "Muzik"
- Music Portal Mnet Award: **2NE1**
- Mobile Popularity Award: **Super Junior**
- CGV Popularity Award: **Super Junior**
- Oversea Viewers Award: **Super Junior**
- Best Global Artist: **The Pussycat Dolls**
- Best Global Performance: **Lady Gaga**

== Multiple awards ==
=== Artist(s) with multiple wins ===
The following artist(s) received two or more wins (excluding the special awards):

Awards	Artist(s)
3	2NE1
2	2PM
2	Brown Eyed Girls

=== Artist(s) with multiple nominations ===
The following artist(s) received more than two nominations:

Nominations	Artist(s)
4	2NE1
3	Baek Ji-young
3	G-Dragon
3	2PM

== Presenters ==
- Jeong Ga-eun – Presenter of the award for Best New Male Artists
- Davichi – Presenter of the award for Best New Female Artists
- Baby V.O.X. – Introduced the 2nd wave
- Julien Kang – VTR – Reported Trot and Hallyu Wave via MAMA News
- Seo Young and Julien Kang – Presenters of the award for Best Trot
- Lee Yong-Woo and Hyun Jyu-ni – Presenters of the award for Best Dance
- Lee Sagan and Richard O'Neill – Presenters of Best Mixed Gender Group
- Kim Jin-pyo – Presenter of the award for Best Hiphop
- Nam Ji-hyun and Lee Seung-hyo – Presenters of the award for Best Rock
- Park Han-byul – Presenter of the award for Asia Recommended Award (Japan)
- Han Go-eun – Presenter of the award for Best House & Electronic
- Yoon Jong-shin and Hareem – Presenters of the award for Best Ballad R&B
- 2NE1 and Supreme Team – Presenters of the award for Best Asia Star Award
- Kang Ye-won and Yoo Young-seok – Presenters of Best Male Solo Artist
- Park Han-byul and Hwihwang – Presenters of Best Female Solo Artist
- Nicole Scherzinger – Introduced "Nobody Syndrome" (Best Asian Composer)
- Koo Jun-yup and Junan – Introduced MAMA in Taiwan
- Ming Dao, Wang Feifei, Sarah – Presenters of the award for Asia Recommended Award (China)
- Lee Seung-yeon and CGV rep. Kang Seok-hee – Presenters of the award for Best Music Video
- Baby V.O.X. – Presenters of the award for Best Female Group
- Jin Goo – Presenter of the award for Best Male Group
- Yoon Je-kyoon – Presenter of the award for Album of the Year
- Kang Ho-dong – Presenter of the award for Song of the Year
- Kwon Sang-woo – Presenter of the award for Artist of the Year
- Tiger JK – Closing Remarks

== Gallery ==
2009 MAMA gallery
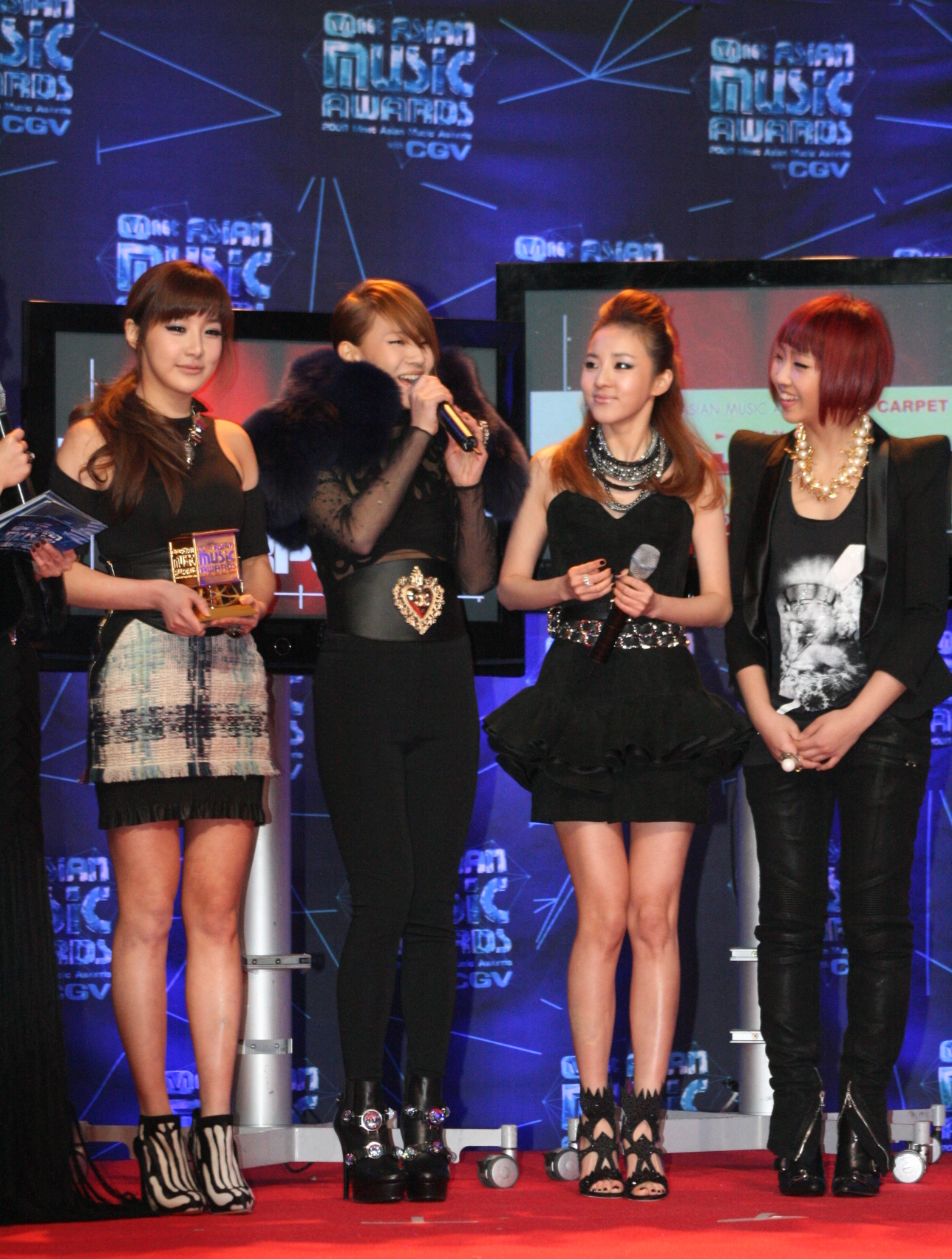
2NE1

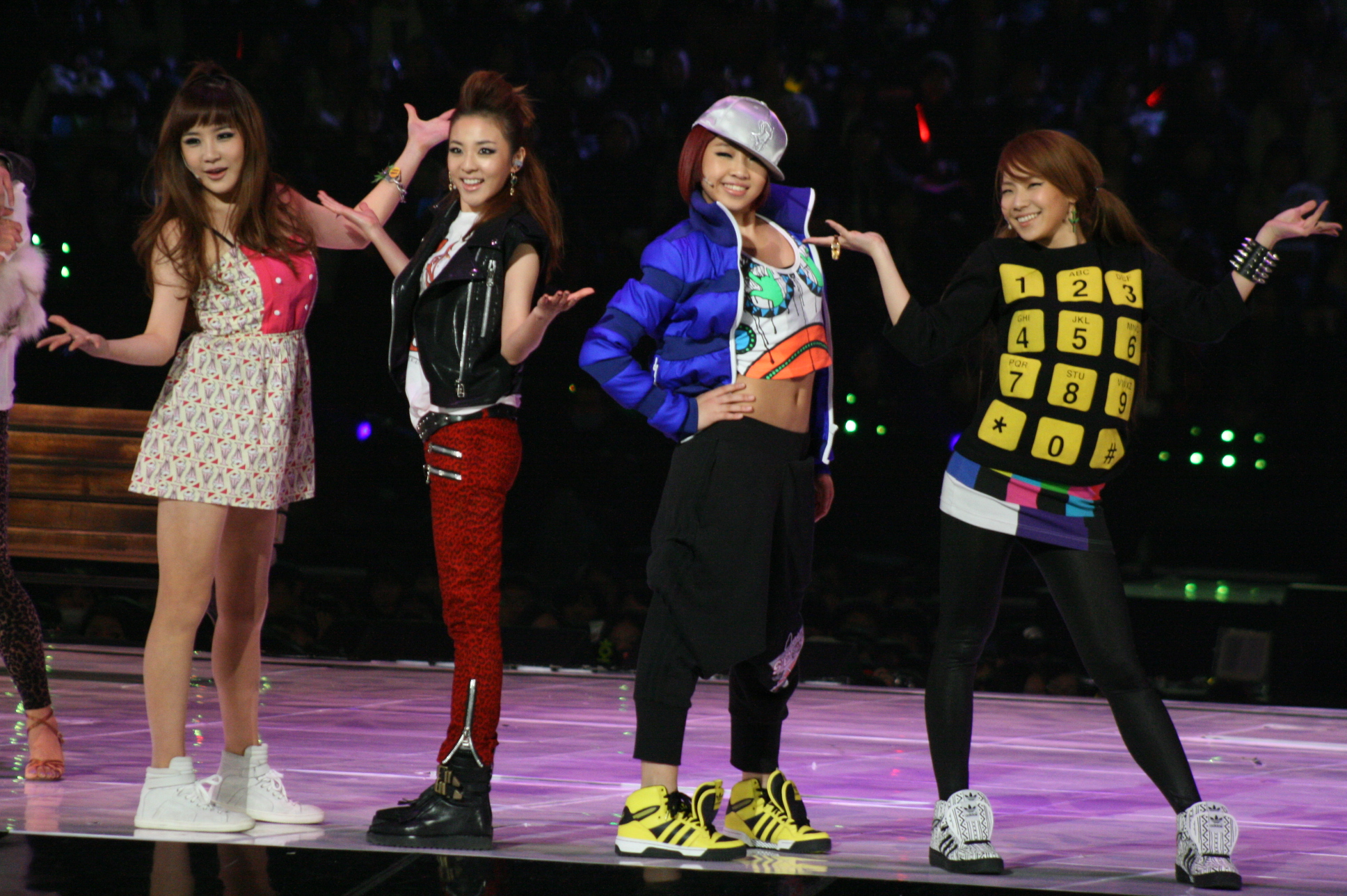
2NE1 performing

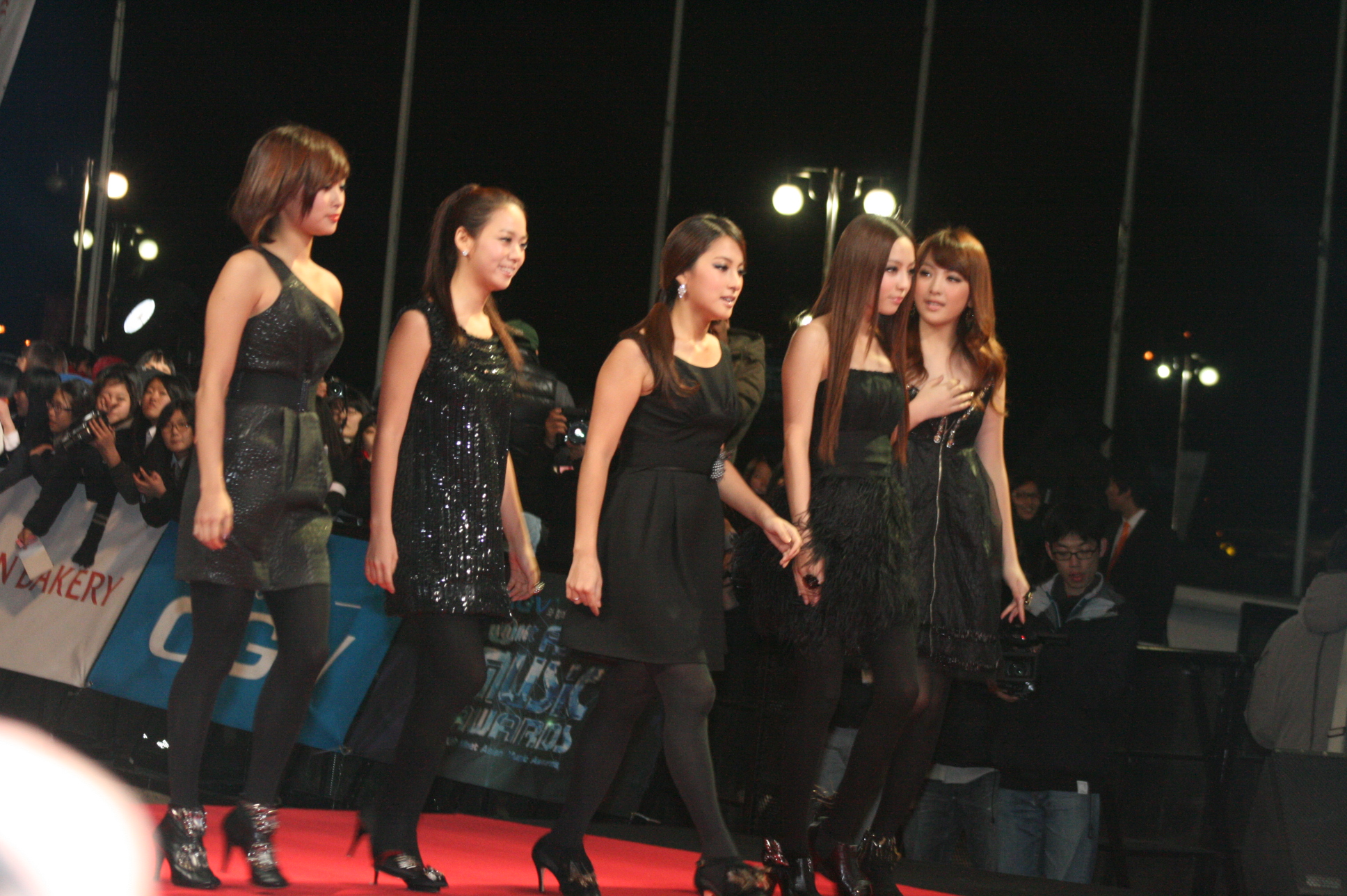
Kara walking the red carpet

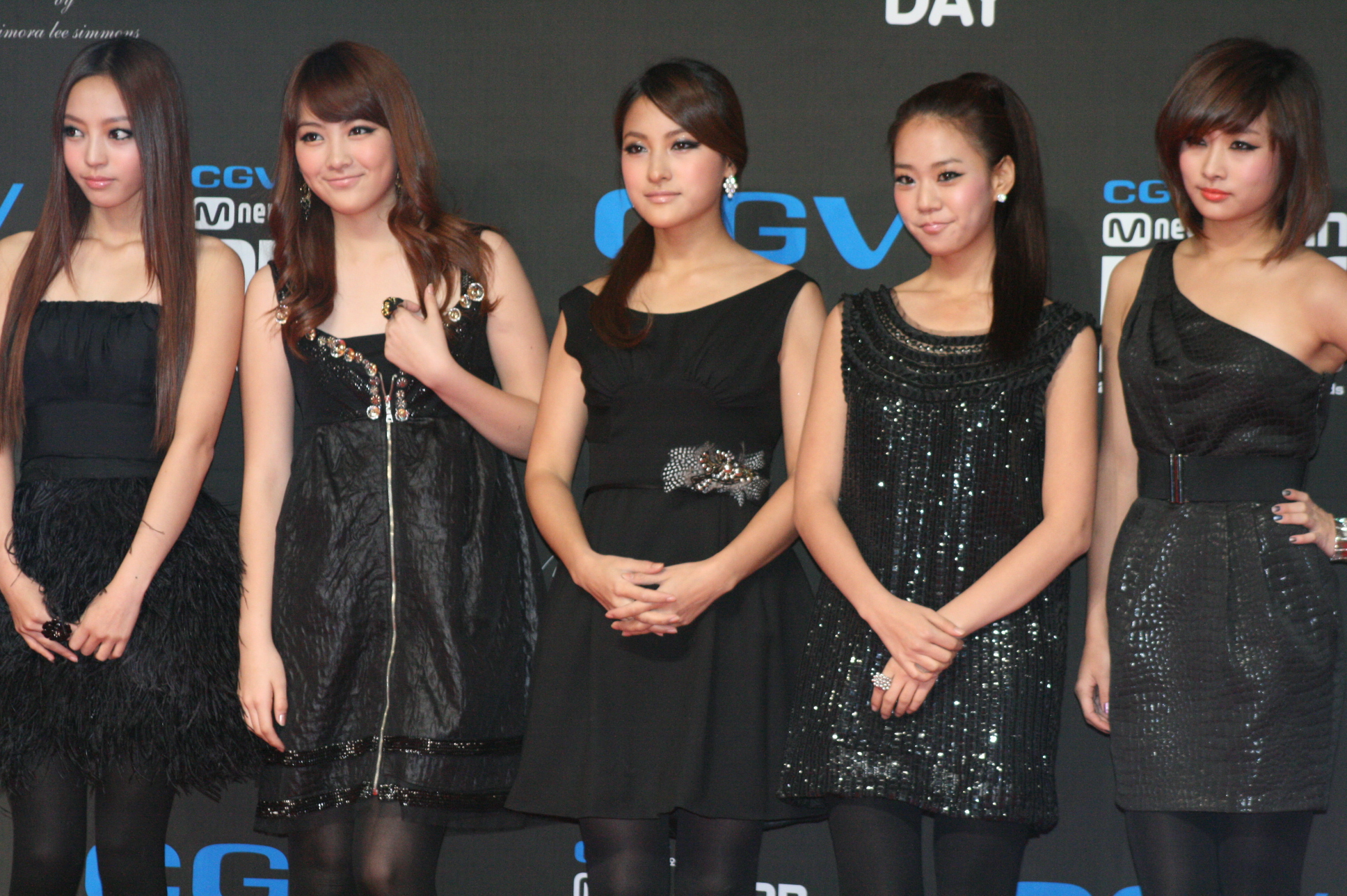
Kara

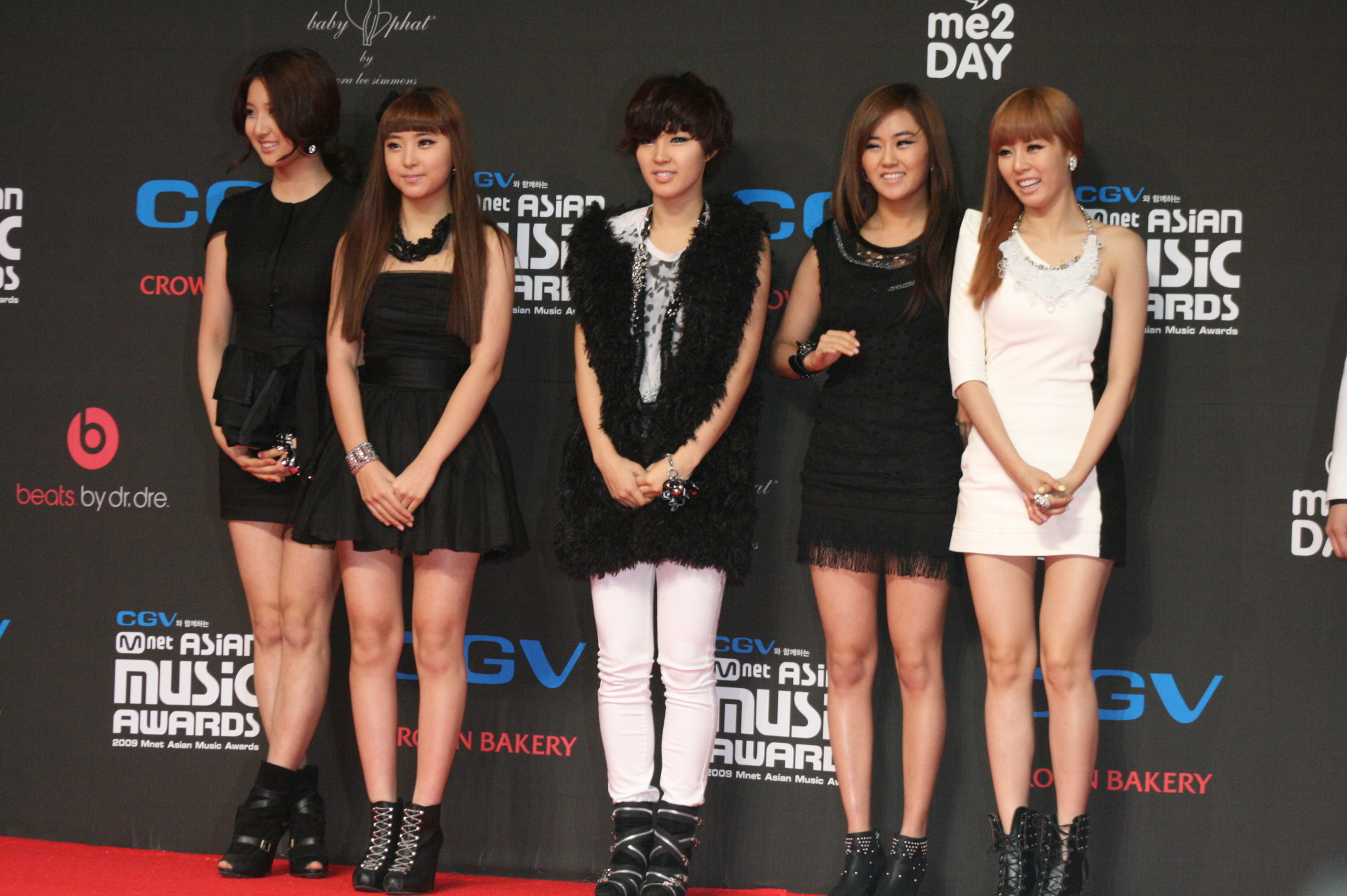
4Minute

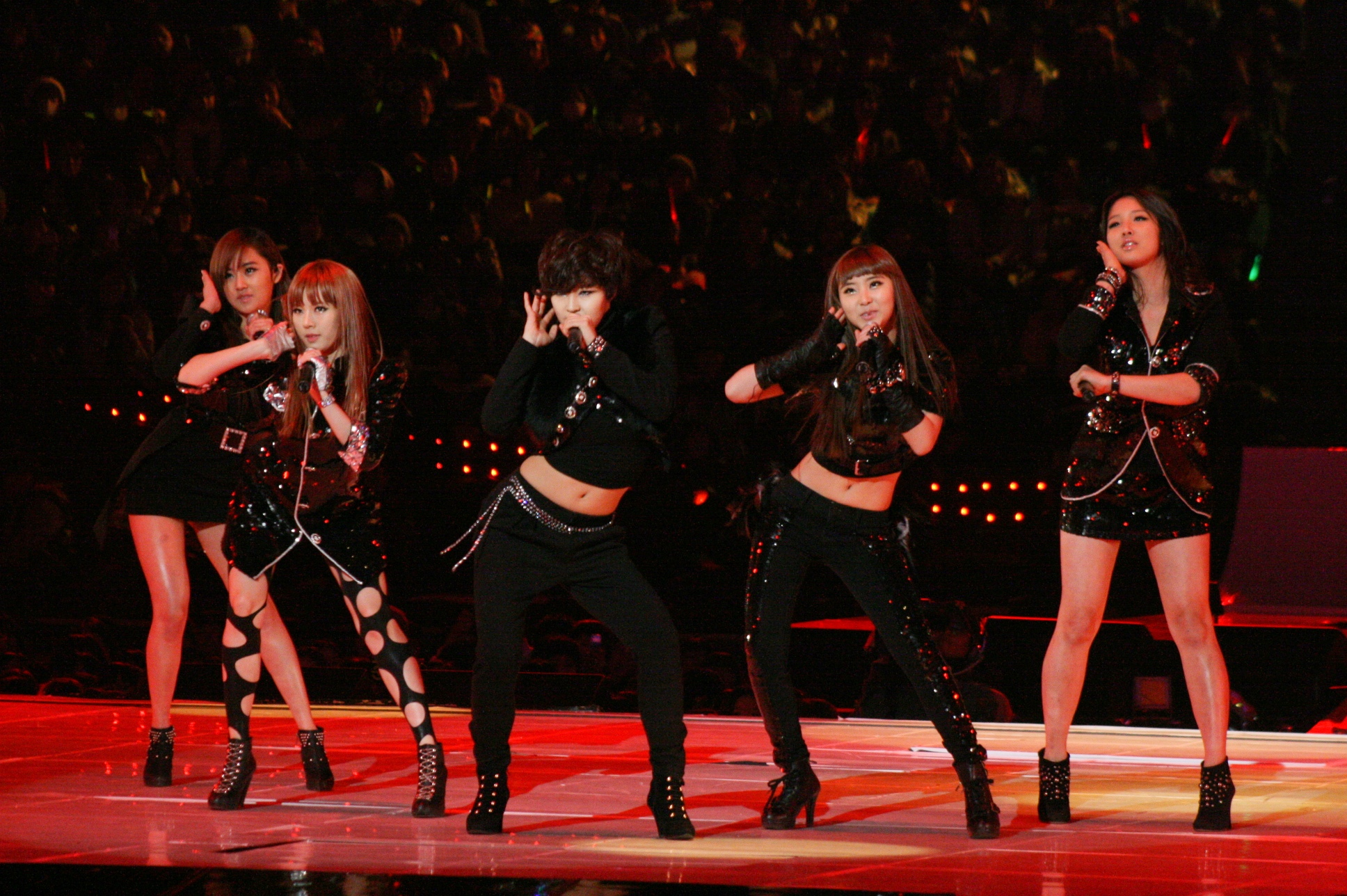
4Minute performing

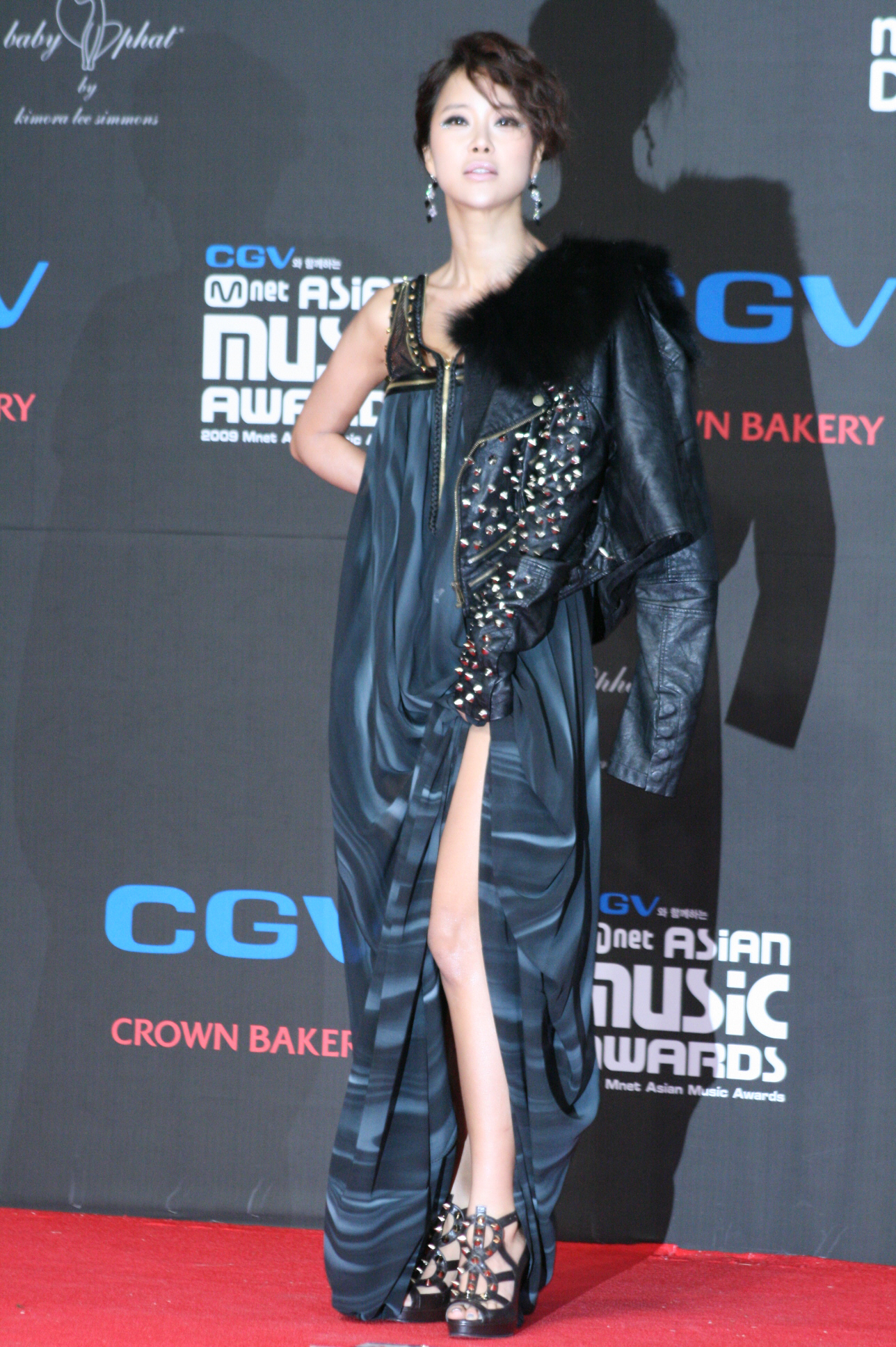
Baek Ji-young

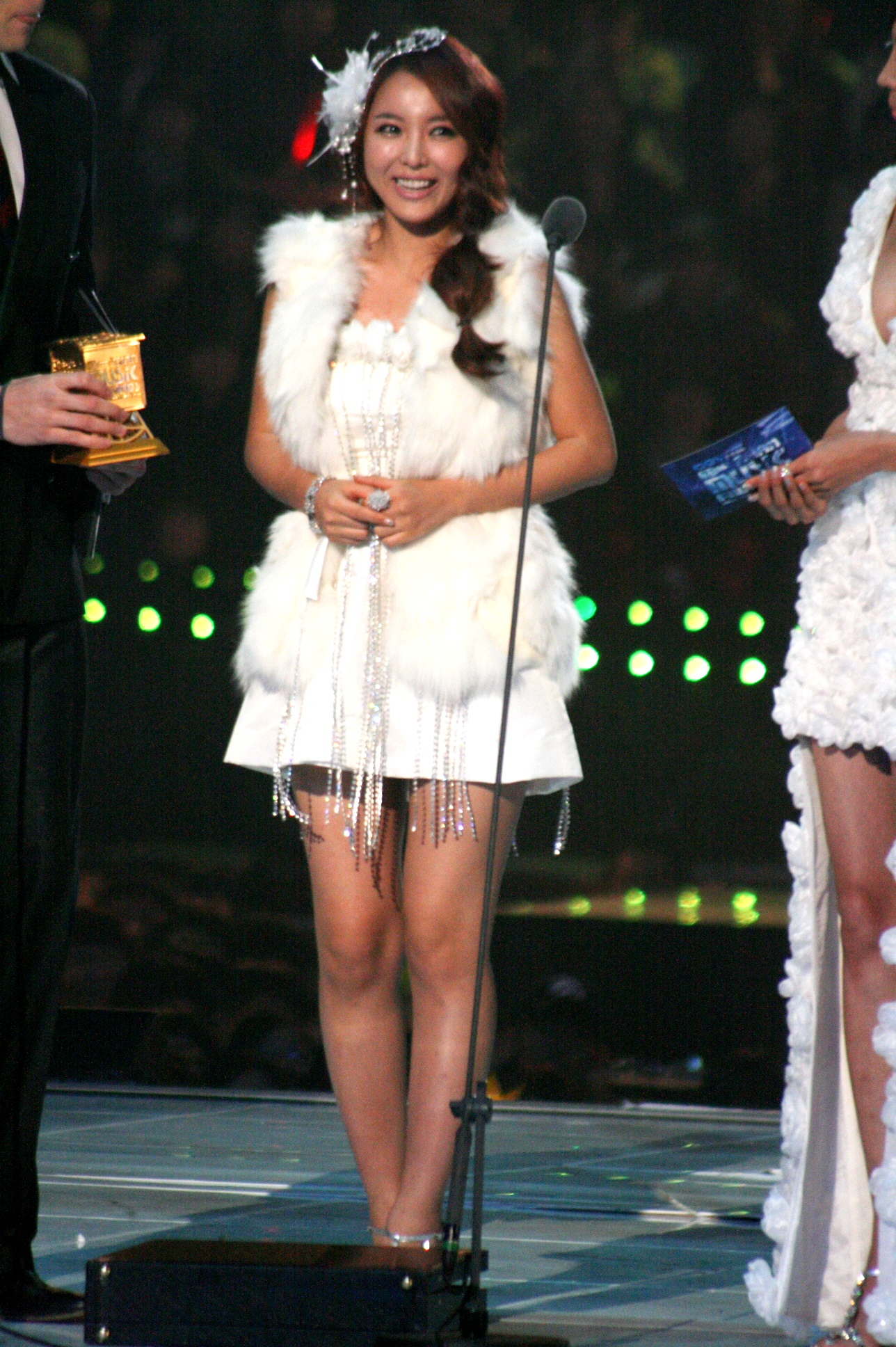
Hong Jin-young

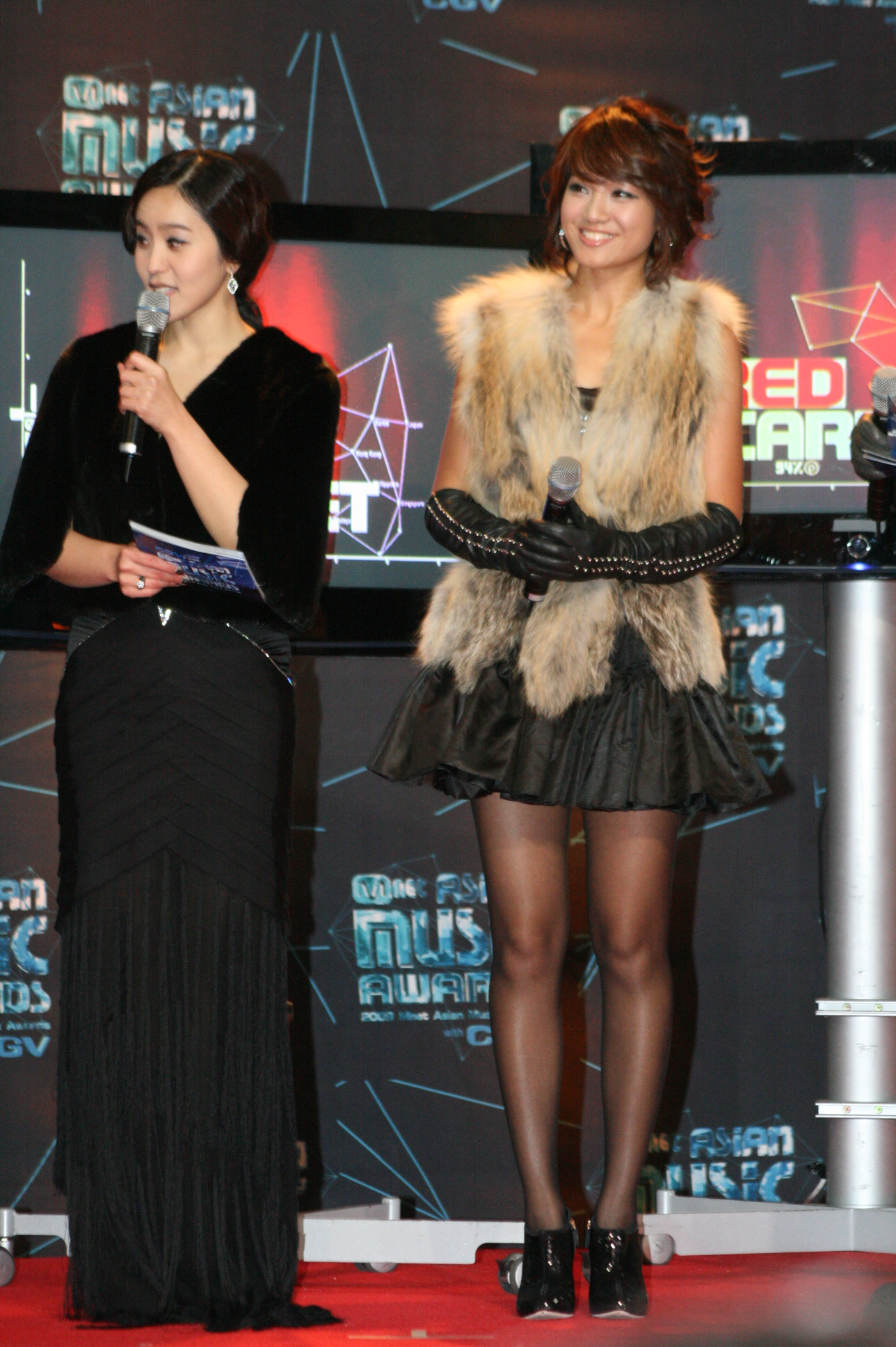
Park Ji-yoon and Zhu Dan

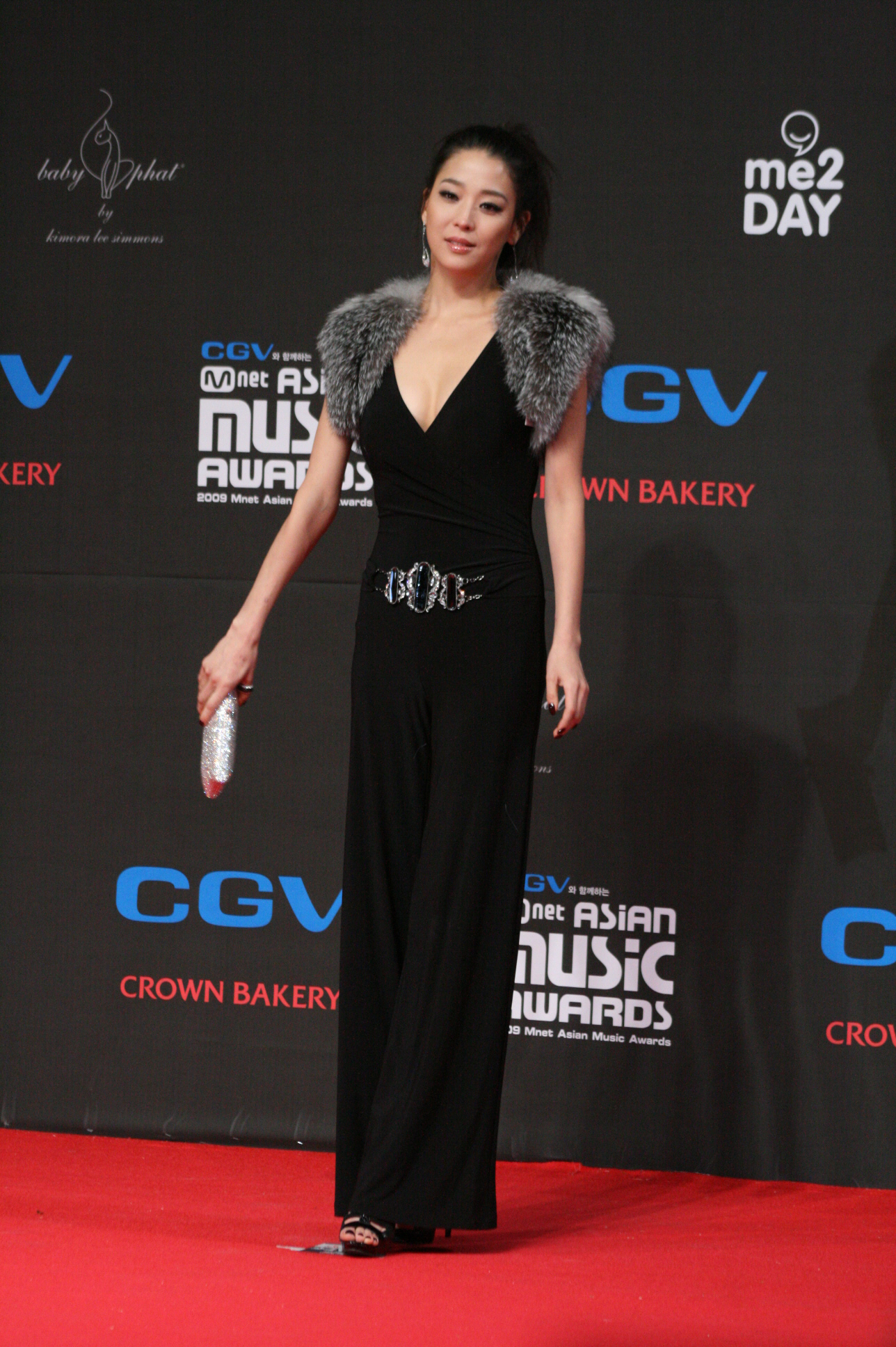
Han Go-eun

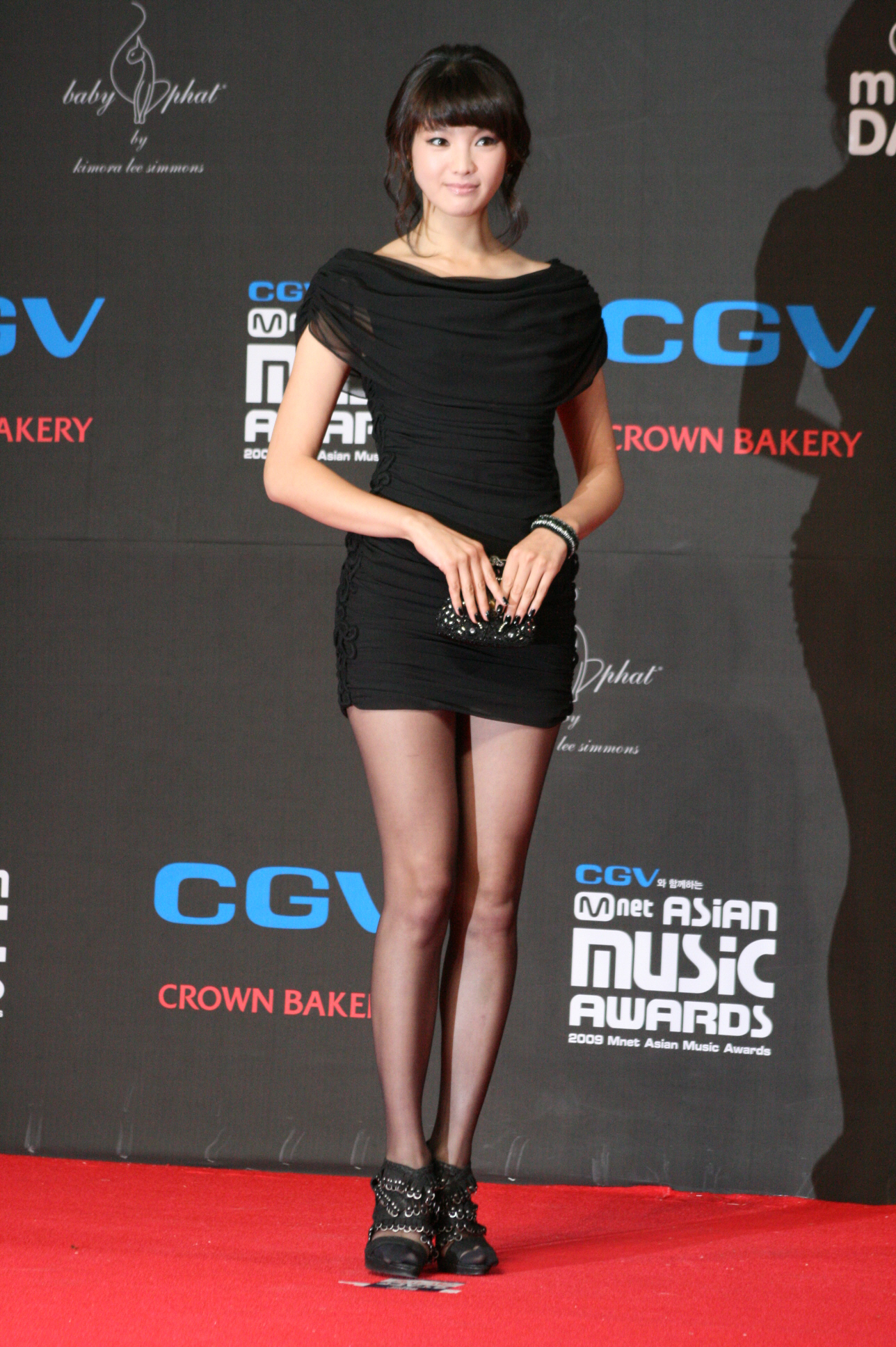
Jeong Ga-eun

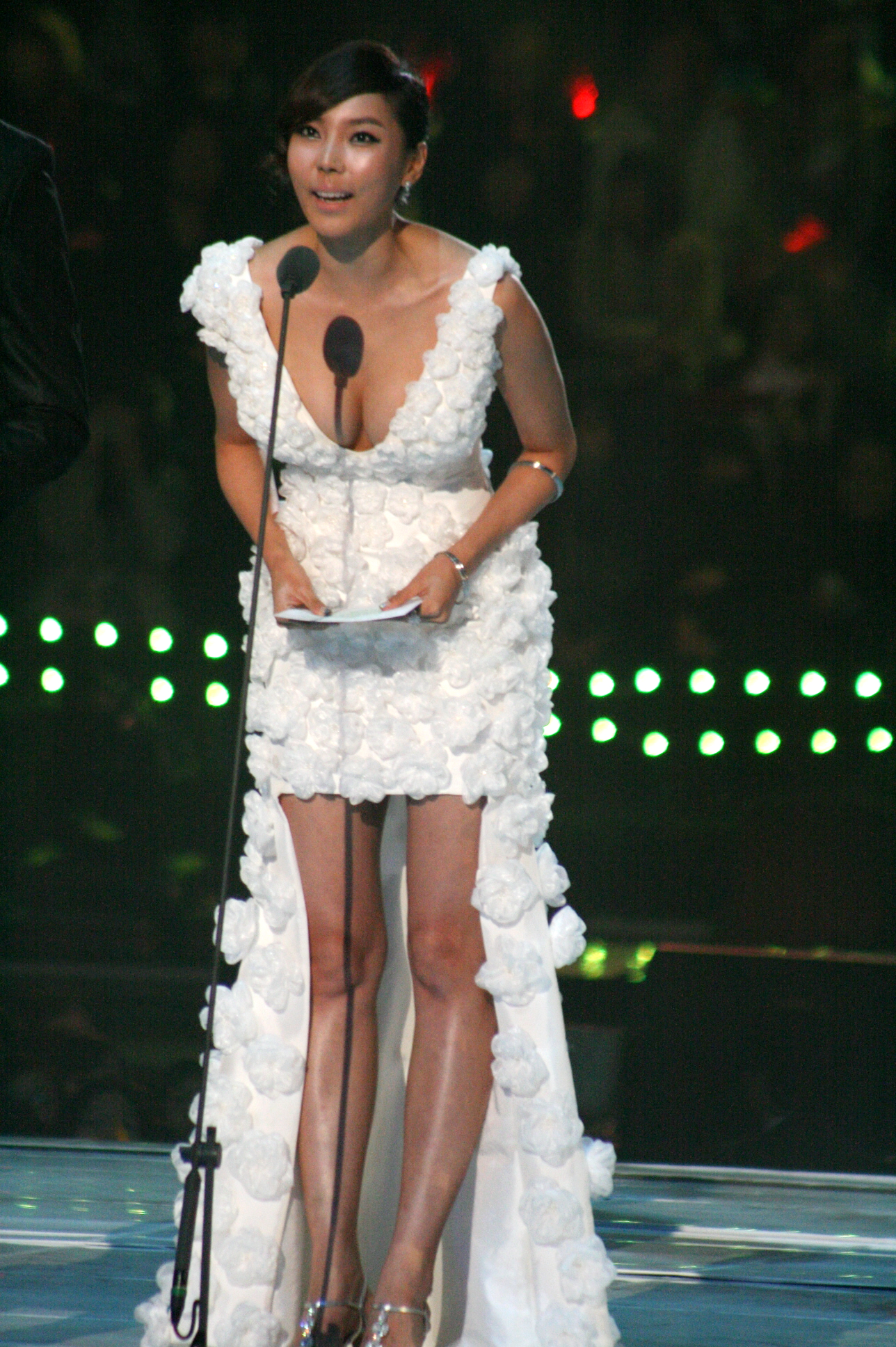
Seo Young

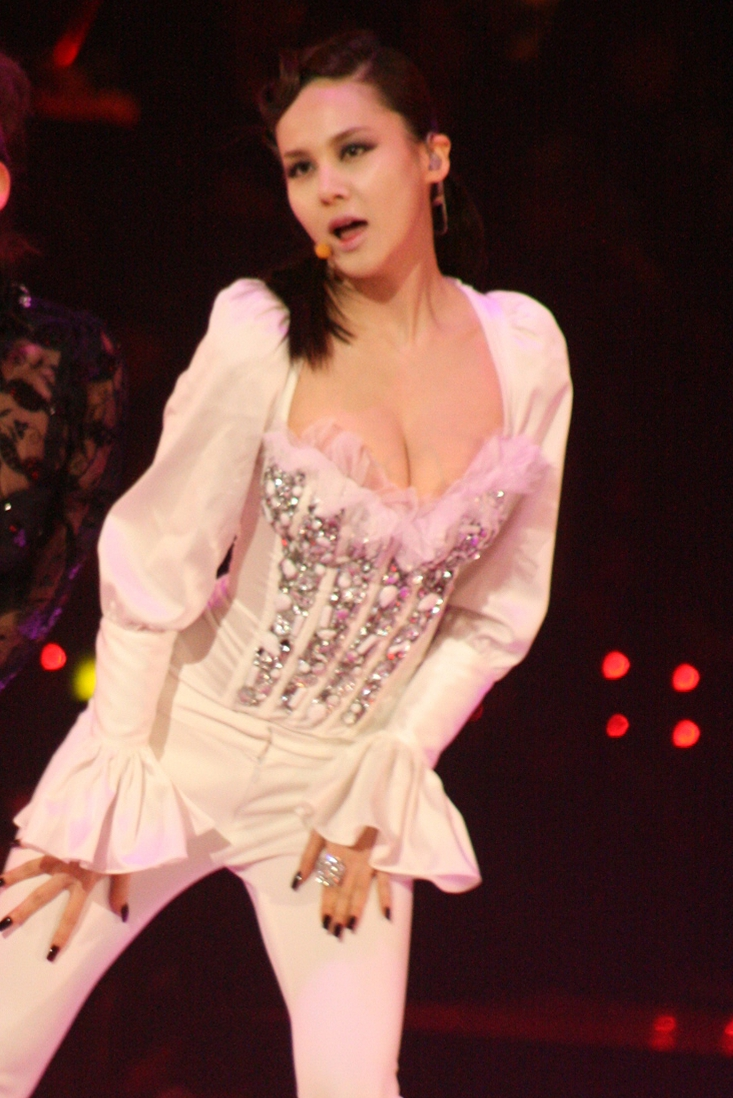
Ivy performing

== Controversy ==
SM Entertainment and Inwoo Production boycotted the event on November 21, hence none of their artists attended the event. The latter company, representing trot singers Jang Yun-jeong and Park Hyun-bin, announced the boycott and questioned the fairness of the awards ceremony. Meanwhile, the former stated through a press release that they have reservation regarding the standard of fairness and criteria used in their selections, citing that Girls' Generation had topped a music chart for nine consecutive weeks but was never placed first place on their show and only debut on their charts a month after the album was released. They also asked that their artists be removed from a mobile poll which requires participants to pay a fee in order to vote saying they "do not want to see fans suffer any damage from the poll which has commercial intentions".

Son Dam-bi and After School from Pledis Entertainment and SS501 from DSP Media also did not attend the award ceremony but cited scheduling conflicts rather than a boycott.
