= Bobby Kim =

South Korean rapper and singer

Bobby Kim 김바비
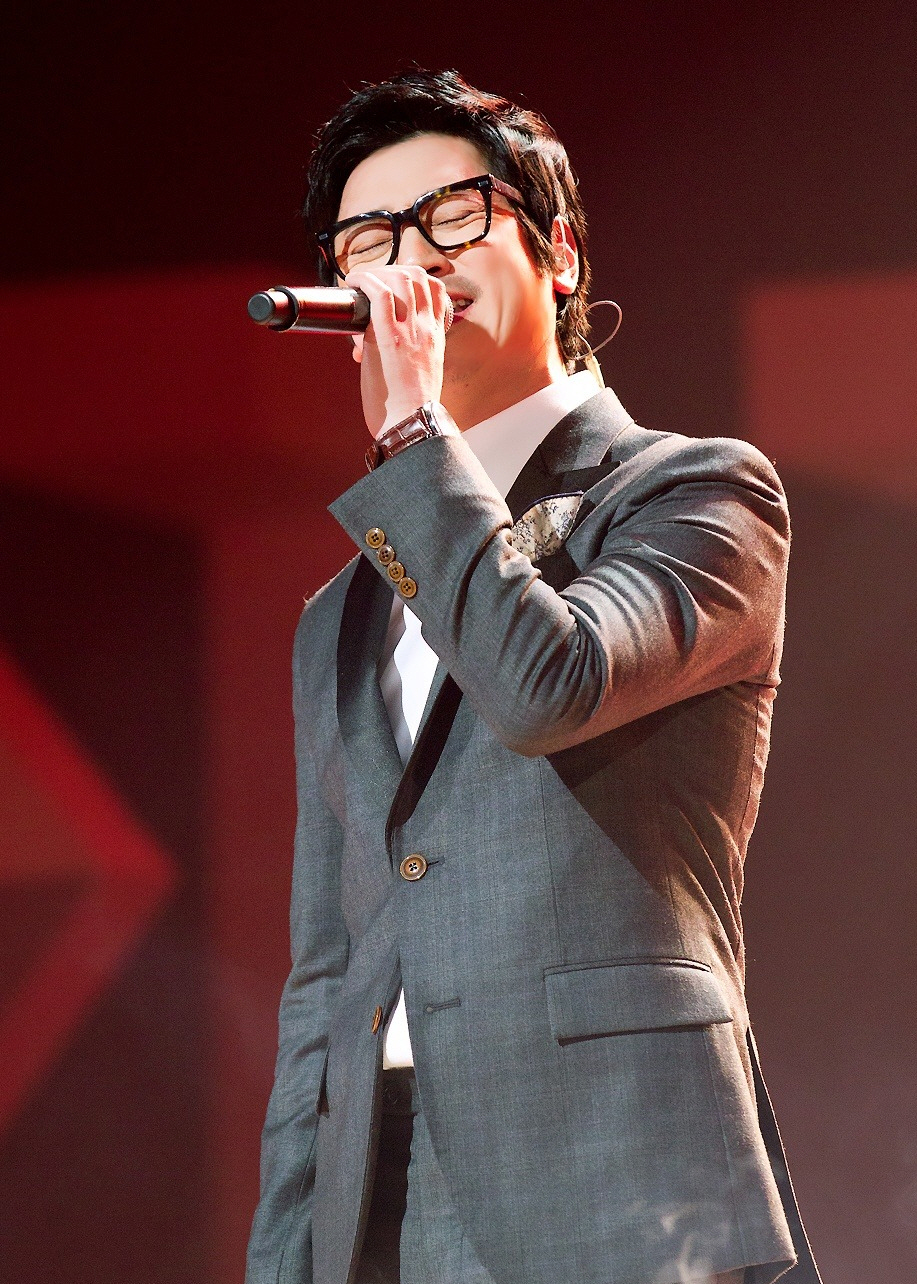
- Kim in 2014

Background information
- Born: January 12, 1973 (age 53)
- Origin: South Korea
- Genres: Korean hip hop, R&B
- Years active: 1994–present
- Label: Attrakt
- Spouse: Unknown (m. 2022)

Kim Do-kyun (Korean: 김도균; born January 12, 1973), more commonly known as Bobby Kim (바비 킴), is a South Korean hip hop and R&B artist.

== Music career ==
His father, a trumpet player, influenced and exposed him to music. At an early age, he worked as a rapper at night clubs. Since high school, he performed in clubs in the San Francisco underground. That time, he got attracted by hip hop when America was in a golden age of hip hop, but he learned many genres of music as well. Later in 1992, he went to Korea to start his music career. In 1994, he debuted as a member of a group called Dr. Reggae. However, the group could not achieve much success. Thus, he started doing features as a background rapper, appearing on numerous singles. Also, he worked as a producer, creating singles for artists in Korea.

Bobby Kim is about to release his second special album Old & New on July 6, 2012. The album is to feature remakes of old songs as well as new tracks for fans to enjoy a total of 11 tracks.

== Dr. Reggae and I Am a Singer ==
After he finished high school, he made a group called Dr. Reggae and introduced Reggae music to Korea for the first time. At that time, only two members were active, so it was known as a duet. However, it was actually seven members at first. Bobby Kim was not as successful when he was a part of Dr. Reggae. After Dr. Reggae disbanded, he became a vocal trainer for hip hop singers and taught singing and rapping techniques. He was nicknamed "Reggae hip hop's godfather". He also wrote songs for singers such as Drunken Tiger, Leessang, and Dynamic Duo.

His songs showed a unique rhythm. After his colleagues listened to his music, they suggested he sing his own songs. Therefore, he produced his debut album called Beat Within my Soul.

On 11 September 2011, he appeared during the sixth session of the show I Am a Singer, but he was voted off at the eleventh session, which was on 1 January 2012.

== Controversy ==
Kim was accused of sexually harassing a flight attendant and creating a disturbance while drunk on a flight from Korea to the United States in January 2015. Kim stopped appearing in all television shows, including the TV Art Stage. On June 11, 2015, Incheon District Court's Judge, Shim Dong-young, issued Kim with a fine of 4 million won, and ordered him to complete a 40-hour sexual violence educational program for infringing upon an aviation law and for forcibly harassing an airline employee.

== Personal life ==
On May 5, 2022, Bobby Kim announced plans to marry his non-celebrity girlfriend on June 10 at a church in Seoul, with family and close acquaintances. Kim welcomed a daughter on June 18, 2026.

== Discography ==
=== Studio albums ===
Title	Album details	Peak chart positions		Sales
Title	Album details	KOR RIAK	KOR Gaon (Note: The Gaon Music Chart was established in 2010.)	Sales
Holy Bumz Presents	Released: 1998; Rereleased: 2004 as Ground Zero; Format: CD, cassette	—	—	
Beats Within My Soul	Released: August 6, 2004; Label: Oscar Entertainment; Format: CD, cassette	15	—	KOR: 55,135
Follow Your Soul	Released: December 11, 2006; Label: Oscar Entertainment; Format: CD, digital download	8	—	KOR: 56,402
Love Chapter 1	Released: January 12, 2009; Label: Oscar Entertainment; Format: CD, digital download	—N/a	25	
Heart & Soul	Released: April 23, 2010; Label: Oscar Entertainment; Format: CD, digital download	—N/a	2	KOR: 31,670
Old & New	Released: July 6, 2012; Label: Oscar Entertainment; Format: CD, digital download	—N/a	7	KOR: 5,324
Mirror (거울)	Released: October 22, 2014; Label: Oscar Entertainment; Format: CD, digital download	—N/a	10	KOR: 2,469
"—" denotes album did not chart.

=== Extended plays ===
Title	Album details	Peak chart positions	Sales
Title	Album details	KOR Gaon	Sales
Scarlette	Released: May 17, 2019; Label: StarCrew Entertainment; Format: CD, digital download	73	

=== Singles ===
Title	Year	Peak chart positions	Album
Title	Year	KOR	Album
"Free Style"	1998	—	Holy Bumz Presents
"Falling In Love Again" (고래의 꿈) (feat. Kim Yeong-geun)	2004	—	Beats Within My Soul
"It's Alright, It's All Good" (feat. Yoon Mi-rae)	2004	—	Beats Within My Soul
"Bluebird" (파랑새) (feat. Jeon Je-deok)	2006	—	Follow Your Soul
"Maybe" (메이비)	2008	—	Rhapsody Part 3
"Love..That Guy" (사랑..그 놈)	2009	—	Love Chapter 1
"Like a Man" (남자답게)	2010	8	Heart & Soul
"Lonely" (외톨이)	2010	62	Heart & Soul
"True Colors" (with soulsweet)	2010	— (Note: "True Colors" didn't enter the Gaon Digital Chart but peaked at number 99 on the component Gaon Download Chart.)	Non-album singles
"You Aren't the Only One" (너 하나만 못해) (with Double K)	2010	48	Non-album singles
"Love Recipe" (러브 레시피) (with Gummy)	2010	8	Non-album singles
"Only You" (너만이)	2012	25	Non-album singles
"People These Days" (요즘 사람들) (with Gummy)	2012	22	Non-album singles
"Afraid of Love" (못됐다 사랑)	2012	31	Old & New
"In My Dream" (꿈에)	2012	44	Old & New
"Girl" (그런 걸) (with Kim Tae-woo)	2012	63	Non-album singles
"I'm Alive" (내가 사는 이유) (feat. Kingston Rudieska)	2013	49	Non-album singles
"Apology" (사과) (feat. Kim Yeong-geun)	2014	— (Note: "Apology" didn't enter the Gaon Digital Chart but peaked at number 68 on the component Gaon Download Chart.)	Mirror
"Why?" (왜 난)	2019	—	Scarlette
"The Sun" (태양처럼)	2021	—	Non-album singles
"Night" (밤하늘)	2022	— (Note: "Night" didn't enter the Gaon Digital Chart but peaked at number 43 on the component Gaon Download Chart.)	Non-album singles
"Intoxicated" (취했어)	2022	— (Note: "Intoxicated" didn't enter the Gaon Digital Chart but peaked at number 84 on the component Gaon Download Chart.)	Non-album singles
"—" denotes album did not chart.

=== Soundtrack appearances ===
Title	Year	Peak chart positions	Album
Title	Year	KOR	Album
"Fall In Love With You"	2010	79	Dr. Champ OST
"Ikkeulim" (이끌림)	2010	83	Haru OST
"Still" (그래도)	2010	—	Home Sweet Home OST
"Love is Scared" (사랑이 무서워)	2011	39	Spy Myung-wol OST
"When We Are Able to Love" (사랑 할 수 있을 때) (with Gil Hak-mi)	2011	43	Spy Myung-wol OST
"Heartburn" (가슴앓이)	2011	48	Glory Jane OST
"Only You"	2012	—	Love and War OST
"Thank You!"	2013	—	Pots of Gold OST
"Forever You" (영원히 너를)	2013	51	Goddess of Fire OST
"Stranger" (이방인)	2014	67	Doctor Stranger OST
"I Can Love You" (사랑한다 할 수 있기에)	2016	38	Remember OST
"El Camino"	2019	—	Woman of 9.9 Billion OST
"—" denotes album did not chart.

=== Other charted songs ===
Title	Year	Peak chart positions	Album
Title	Year	KOR	Album
"Heunhan Sarang" (흔한 사랑) (feat. Sean2slow)	2010	96	Heart & Soul
"Maem Maem Maem" (맴 맴 맴) (feat. Gil Hak-mi & Double K)	2010	73	Heart & Soul
"Neoegeman" (너에게만)	2010	94	Heart & Soul
"How to Avoid the Sun" (태양을 피하는 방법) (original by Rain)	2011	29	I Am a Singer
"Your Wedding" (너의 결혼식) (original by Yoon Jong-shin)	2011	23	I Am a Singer
"Alley" (골목길) (original by Shinchon Blues)	2011	9	I Am a Singer
"Reunion in Memory" (추억 속의 재회) (original by Cho Yong-pil)	2011	15	I Am a Singer
"Waterwheel Live" (물레방아 인생) (with Buga Kingz, original by Jo Young-nam)	2011	16	I Am a Singer
"Love Love Love" (사랑 사랑 사랑) (original by Kim Hyun-sik)	2011	39	I Am a Singer
"Meeting" (만남) (original by Noh Sa-yeon)	2011	91	I Am a Singer
"Love Me Once Again" (미워도 다시 한 번) (original by Vibe)	2011	35	I Am a Singer
"It's Been a Long Time" (한동안 뜸했었지) (original by Love And Peace)	2011	96	I Am a Singer
"Remembrance" (회상) (original by Sanulrim)	2011	21	I Am a Singer
"Love Gone with Autumn Behind" (가을을 남기고 간 사랑) (original by Patti Kim)	2011	69	I Am a Singer
"Double" (original by Kim Gun-mo)	2012	68	I Am a Singer
"That Day, One Year Ago" (일년 전 그날) (with So Ji-sub)	2012	41	Corona Borealis

== Awards and nominations ==
=== Mnet Asian Music Awards ===
Year	Category	Work	Result	Ref.
2007	Best R&B Performance	"Bluebird"	Nominated	
2009	Best Ballad/R&B Performance	"Today More Than Yesterday"	Nominated	
