= Top Gear France =

- Genre: Motoring; Entertainment
- Presented by: Sylvain Lévy; Pierre Chabrier; The Stig
- Opening theme: "Jessica"
- Country of origin: France
- Original language: French
- No. of series: 5
- No. of episodes: 45

Production
- Executive producer: Gery Leymergie
- Producers: Stéphane Gillot; Olivier Ruan
- Production company: BBC

Original release
- Network: RMC Découverte Prime Video
- Release: 3 March 2015 – present

Related
- Top Gear Australia; Top Gear Russia; Top Gear (US); Top Gear (UK); Top Gear Korea; Stars in Fast Cars; Top Gear of the Pops; Top Ground Gear Force; James May's Cars of the People

Top Gear France is a French television series about motor vehicles, primarily cars, derived from the British series of the same name. It was broadcast for the first time on 18 March 2015 on the RMC Découverte channel. From 2015 to 2022, it was presented by actor Philippe Lellouche, the professional racing driver Bruce Jouanny and electronic music artist and journalist Yann Larret-Menezo (aka "Le Tone"). In 2023, the show was presented by Sylvain Lévy and Pierre Chabrier.

== History ==
In March 2014, Jean-Louis Blot, the director of BBC France, announced that his company was working on a French adaptation of the show Top Gear. On 28 August 2014, RMC Découverte announced at its autumn conference the production of a French version, which started broadcasting on 18 March 2015.

Filming began at the end of 2014 and 27 January 2015 on the runways on the Brienne-le-Château airfield, located near Troyes.

On May 17, 2023, it was announced that the new series would be broadcast on Prime Video on top of RMC Découverte with two new hosts: Sylvain Lévy and Pierre Chabrier from the YouTube channel Vilebrequin.

== Overview ==
200 candidates were suggested for the cast, including Christophe Dechavanne, Vincent Cerutti, Stéphane De Groodt, Vincent Perrot, and Stéphane Rotenberg.

On November 7, 2014 the trio of presenters were announced. They are the actor (and former journalist) Philippe Lellouche, professional driver Bruce Jouanny, and electronic music artist and journalist Yann Larret-Menezo, former editor of the magazine Intersection. Luc Alphand joins the team in 2021 as the fourth member.

== Episodes ==
=== Series 1 ===
No.	Title	Original release date
1	"The Test of the Four Elements" "À l'épreuve des quatre éléments"	3 March 2015
2	"The Crossing of Paris" "La traversée de Paris"	18 March 2015
3	"France-Germany, revenge (Car football)" "France-Allemagne, la revanche (Carfootball)"	25 March 2015
4	"Amphibious challenge" "Défi amphibie"	1 April 2015
5	"Road trip to the mountain" "Road trip à la montagne"	8 April 2015
6	"Twingo 3 in all its States" "Twingo 3 dans tous ses états"	15 April 2015
7	"Occupation Stuntman" "Profession cascadeur"	22 April 2015

=== Series 2 ===
This second season of Top Gear France contains 8 episodes and three additional episodes.

=== Series 3 ===
This third season of Top Gear France contains 8 episodes. The first episode was broadcast on December 21, 2016.

== Broadcast ==
The first season consisted of 10 episodes, seven of which are completely new and three that include the highlights of that season. Top Gear episodes are broadcast on RMC Découverte on Wednesday evening at 20:45 for the first episode and 22:20 for the second.

The first program broadcast at 20:45 on 18 March 2015 set an audience record for RMC Découverte, with 966,000 viewers and a 3.6% audience share.

== Segments ==
=== Challenges ===
During this sequence, the presenters are given a limited budget to buy a car that meets specific criteria. In the first episode, they receive €1500 to buy the car of their childhood dreams (a Renault Fuego, a BMW 3 Series, and a Talbot Matra Rancho). In the third episode, Le Tone and Bruce Jouanny play football with French and German vehicles in a rematch of the 2014 FIFA World Cup quarterfinal between France and Germany.
