= Philippe Lellouche =

French actor, director, screenwriter, television presenter and singer

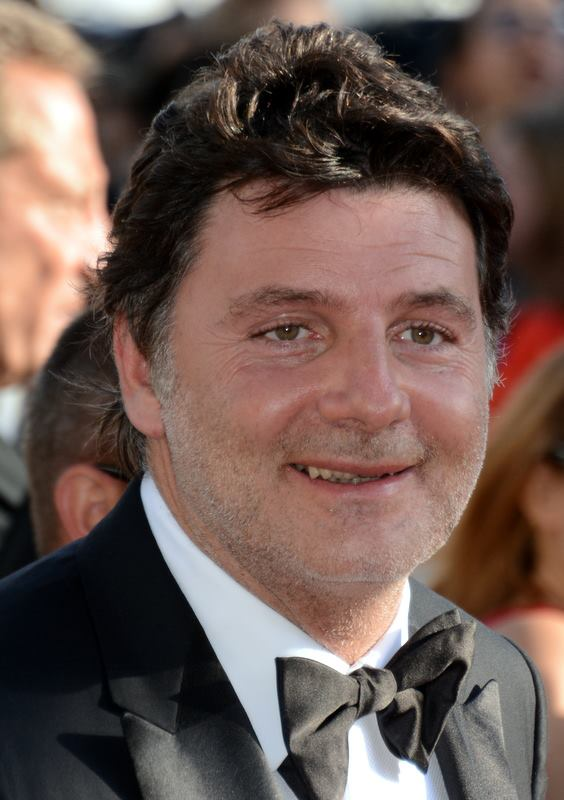
- Philippe Lellouche at the 2013 Cannes Film Festival
- Born: 30 March 1966 (age 60); Tel HaShomer, Israel
- Occupations: Actor, director, screenwriter, television presenter
- Spouse: Vanessa Demouy
- Children: 2

Philippe Lellouche (born 30 March 1966 in Tel HaShomer, Israel) is a French actor, director, screenwriter, television presenter and singer. His brother is the actor Gilles Lellouche.

== Biography ==
After studying journalism, Philippe Lellouche joined the radio station France Inter where he presented a comedy show. He then became a reporter and worked for the French TV channel TF1 for a short period before joining the team of Envoyé spécial on France 2, where he was spotted by Marion Sarraut who offered him a role in the television series Une femme d'honneur. He followed this up with various roles, most notably in the films Michel Vaillant, produced by Luc Besson and Narco, co-directed by his brother Gilles Lellouche.

Encouraged by those close to him to go on the stage, Lellouche wrote his first one man show but it was with Le Jeu de la vérité, which he wrote and performed with his future wife, Vanessa Demouy, and the actors David Brécourt and Christian Vadim, that he achieved success. The show was well-received and led to a sequel, Le Jeu de la vérité 2. These two shows have been performed several hundred times as well as being recorded and regularly transmitted on television. Since 2009, his third show, featuring the same cast, has played to full houses throughout France and was broadcast live on the television channel France 4 on 14 October 2011.

In February 2010, Lellouche appeared on Paris Première's Cactus talk show alongside Christine Boutin and Robert Ménard, discussing the showing of the short film Le Baiser de la Lune in primary schools. He declared himself sceptical about this anti-homophobia initiative, judging that the clip would rather make watchers “sensitive to homosexuality” (sensibilisation à l'homosexualité); and that it shouldn't be shown to primary school students.

In July 2011, Lellouche directed the film Nos plus belles vacances in Brittany, working with his three usual collaborators as well a cast featuring other friends like Gérard Darmon et Julie Gayet. He was invited by the guitarist Jean-Félix Lalanne to sing Quand j'étais chanteur on his album Une voix, une guitare. Since March 2015, he has co-presented the French version of Top Gear on RMC Découverte with the former Le Mans racing driver Bruce Jouanny and Yann Larret-Menezo, also known as "Le Tone", former editor-in-chief of the magazine Intersection.

== Private life ==
He is the brother of the French actor Gilles Lellouche. Since the summer of 2001, he has lived with Vanessa Demouy, with whom he has a son, Solal, born on 17 May 2003. The couple married on 26 June 2010 in the park of the Château de la Garenne de Launay near Douchy (Loiret). Their daughter Sharlie was born on 5 May 2011.

== Filmography ==
As an actor

- 1997: Une femme d'honneur (episode 1-02, "Pirates de la Route") (TV)
- 1999: Jacotte (TV)
- 2000: Docteur Sylvestre (TV)
- 2000: Lise et André by Denis Dercourt
- 2001: Boomer by Karim Adda
- 2003: Michel Vaillant by Louis-Pascal Couvelaire
- 2004: Narco by Tristan Aurouet and Gilles Lellouche
- 2006: Famille d'accueil (TV)
- 2008: Parking réservé by Philippe Lellouche, short film in support of CRIPS
- 2010: Camping 2 by Fabien Onteniente
- 2011: Mineurs 27 by Tristan Aurouet
- 2011: Bienvenue à bord by Éric Lavaine : William
- 2012: Nos plus belles vacances by Philippe Lellouche
- 2014: Le Jeu de la vérité by François Desagnat
- 2014: Tu veux ou tu veux pas by Tonie Marshall
- Since 2015: Clem (TV series) : Xavier Ferran
- 2016: Le Monde de Dory by Andrew Stanton : French voice of Hank the Octopus
- 2016: Camping 3 by Fabien Onteniente
- 2017: Chacun sa vie by Claude Lelouch

As director

- 1995: Poker co-written with Cédric Brenner, with Martin Lamotte
- 2008: Parking réservé, with Bruno Putzulu and Vanessa Demouy
- 2012: Nos plus belles vacances, with Gérard Darmon and Julie Gayet
- 2013: Un prince (presque) charmant, with Vincent Pérez, Vahina Giocante

== Television ==
- Since 2015: Top Gear France
- Since 2015: Clem

== Theatre ==
Writer

- 2004: One Man Show à trois
- 2005: Le Jeu de la vérité
- 2006: Le Jeu de la vérité 2 and the film adaptation
- 2007: J'en ai marre d'être juif, j'ai envie d'arrêter, Le Cherche midi
- 2009: Boire, fumer et conduire vite
- 2014: L'Appel de Londres, directed by Marion Sarraut
- 2016: Tout à refaire

Actor

- 2004: One man show à trois by Philippe Lellouche and Laurent Spielvogel, with Les Demi-Frères
- 2005/2006: Le Jeu de la vérité by Philippe Lellouche, directed by Marion Sarraut
- 2007: Le Jeu de la vérité 2 by Philippe Lellouche
- 2008: Le Jeu de la vérité 2 by Philippe Lellouche, directed by Philippe Lellouche and Morgan Spillemaecker, Théâtre des Mathurins
- 2009: Le siècle sera féminin ou ne sera pas by Dominique Coubes and Nathalie Vierne
- 2009: Boire, fumer et conduire vite by Philippe Lellouche, directed by Marion Sarraut and Agathe Cémin
- 2010: Boire, fumer et conduire vite by Philippe Lellouche, directed by Marion Sarraut, Théâtre de la Renaissance
- 2014: L'Appel de Londres by Philippe Lellouche, directed by Marion Sarraut
- 2015: Vous êtes mon sujet by Didier Van Cauwelaert, directed by Alain Sachs, Théâtre de La Garenne Colombes, broadcast on France 2 on February 17
- 2016: Tout à refaire by Philippe Lellouche, directed by Gérard Darmon, Théâtre de la Madeleine

Director

- 2006: Jour de neige by Elsa Valensi and Élisabeth Bost
- 2007: Le Jeu de la vérité by Philippe Lellouche, co-directed with Morgan Spielmacker
- 2008: Le Jeu de la vérité 2 by Philippe Lellouche, co-directed with Morgan Spillemaecker, Théâtre des Mathurins
- 2008: Double jeu by and with Jean-Félix Lalanne
