= Sad Love Story =

2005 South Korean television series

- Promotional poster for Sad Love Story
- Also known as: Sad Love Song; Sad Sonata
- Genre: Romance; Melodrama
- Developed by: Kim Sa-hyun (Planning)
- Written by: Lee Sung-eun
- Directed by: Yoo Chul-yong
- Starring: Kwon Sang-woo; Kim Hee-sun; Yeon Jung-hoon
- Music by: Choi Seung-kwon; Lee Seon-kyung; Lee Jeong-mi; Yoon-Geun
- Original languages: Korean; English (some episodes)
- No. of episodes: 20

Production
- Production locations: South Korea; United States
- Running time: 60 minutes
- Production company: Kim Jong-hak Production
- Budget: ₩7 billion

Original release
- Network: MBC TV
- Release: January 5 – March 17, 2005

Sad Love Story (Korean: 슬픈연가; RR: Seulpeunyeonga; lit. 'Sad Sonata') is a 2005 South Korean television drama series starring Kwon Sang-woo, Kim Hee-sun and Yeon Jung-hoon. It aired on MBC from January 5 to March 17, 2005, on Wednesdays and Thursdays at 21:55 for 20 episodes.

== Plot ==
From the moment they meet, Jon-young (Kwon Sang-woo) and the blind Hye-in (Kim Hee-sun) share an instant connection. Young and naïve, they believe that nothing can change their love. Life, however, pulls them in opposite directions. Jon-young is sent to Seoul, while Hye-in immigrates to America. Misleadingly informed that Jon-young is dead, Hye-in struggles to begin a new life alone. Years later, Hye-in returns to Seoul. With her eyesight restored, she is now a singer happily engaged to her producer Gun-woo (Yeon Jung-hoon). Everything changes though when Gun-woo's composer friend turns out to be none other than Jon-young. He instantly recognizes her, but Hye-in has never seen Jun-young before. When love is no longer simple and blind, can Hye-in and Jun-young still find their way back to each other? This series is a series of love, death and suspense.

== Cast ==
Choi/Seo family

- Kwon Sang-woo as Seo Joon-young / Choi Joon-kyu
  - Yoo Seung-ho as young Joon-young
- Yoo Seung-ho as Joon-young's son
- Na Young-hee as Seo Hyang-ja, his mother
- Lee Young-ha as Choi Joon-il, his father

Park family

- Kim Hee-sun as Park Hye-in
  - Kim So-eun as young Park Hye-in
- Jin Hee-kyung as Audrey / Lee Mi-sook, her aunt

Lee family

- Yeon Jung-hoon as Lee Gun-woo
- Jo Kyung-hwan as Lee Kang-in, his father
- Lee Yeon-soo as Lee Soo-ji, his handicapped, older sister
- Lee Jong-won as Oh Sang-jin, Soo-ji's husband

Cha family

- Kim Yeon-joo as Cha Hwa-jung
  - Go Ah-sung as young Hwa-jung
- Lee Mi-young as Hwang Min-kyung, her mother
- Kang Nam-gil as Cha Chang-man, her father, a taxi driver

Extended cast

- Jung Woo as Lee Min-ho, a small-time gangster who likes Hwa-jung
- MC Mong as Jang Jin-pyo, Joon-young and Gun-woo's friend
- Lee Hyun-woo as Jang-ho, guitar player
- Lee Da-hee as Kang Shin-hee, Gun-woo's NYC friend
- Choi Ran as Sook-ja
- Hong Seok-cheon as Charlie
- Yang Geum-seok as Gun-woo's deceased mother
- Baek Bong-ki as Yong-chul
- Kim Hee-jung as Choi Joon-il's girlfriend
- Ha Seok-jin as Ha Seok-jin
- Kim Sung-oh

== Production ==
The series originally cast actor Song Seung-heon to play the character Gun-woo. Song had already filmed several scenes overseas and recorded songs for the soundtrack, when a draft-dodging scandal involving him broke out, causing him to enlist in the military service. On short notice, Yeon Jung-hoon was selected as his replacement.

Partly shot overseas with a budget of ₩7 billion, it was one of the most expensive Korean dramas of the mid-2000s. It received average 16.3% ratings in South Korea. It attracted much attention when it was broadcast in Japan and Middle East.

== International broadcast ==
The series aired in Japan on Fuji TV in August 2005 every Saturday at 4:00 p.m. where it received ratings around 10%. According to a poll conducted by TV Asahi variety show SMAP Station in May 2007, Sad Love Story ranked as the sixth most popular Korean drama in Japan.

The series aired in Indonesia on Indosiar in September 2006 every Saturday at 7:30 p.m. where it received ratings around 10%. Korean Dramas now go on air in According to a poll conducted by antv variety show SMAP Edition in June 2007, Sad Love Story ranked as the sixth most popular Korean drama in Indonesia.
