= Gil Hak-mi =

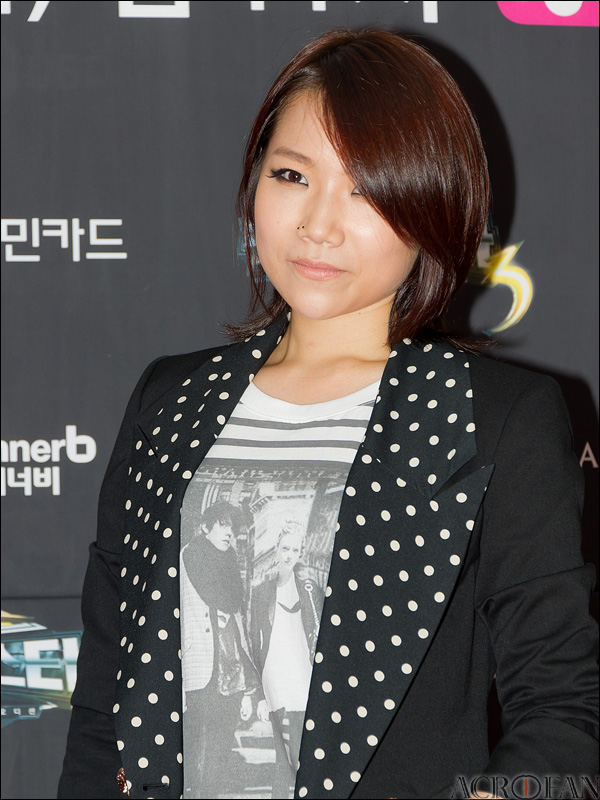
- Gil Hak-mi. Superstar K 3 Highlights Premiere at Red Carpet Event

Background information
- Born: February 18, 1989 (age 36)
- Origin: South Korea
- Genres: K-pop
- Occupation: Singer
- Years active: 2009–present

Korean name
- Hangul: 길학미
- RR: Gil Hakmi
- MR: Kil Hangmi

Gil Hak-mi (Korean: 길학미; born February 18, 1989) is a South Korean singer finishing third in first season of Superstar K. She sings the theme of reality-variety show 2 Days & 1 Night with Han Bora. She is also featured as vocalist on songs of Bobby Kim and Illson.

== Discography ==
=== Extended plays ===
| Title | Album details | Peak chart positions | Sales |
| Title | Album details | KOR | Sales |
|---|---|---|---|
| Super Soul | Released: March 25, 2010; Label: Genie Music; Formats: CD, digital download | 15 | — |

=== Singles ===
| Title | Year | Peak chart positions | Album |
| Title | Year | KOR | Album |
|---|---|---|---|
| "Super Soul" | 2010 | 13 | Super Soul |
| "Winter Story" (겨울이야기) feat. Rado | 2010 | 71 | Non-album singles |
| "Empty Room" (텅 빈 방) | 2013 | — | Non-album singles |
| "Illusion" feat. Double K | 2015 | — | Non-album singles |
"—" denotes release did not chart.

=== Soundtrack appearances ===
| Title | Year | Peak chart positions | Album |
| Title | Year | KOR | Album |
|---|---|---|---|
| "Blah Blah" | 2009 | — | Superstar K1 OST |
| "Let's Go Paradise" with Han Bo-ra | 2010 | — | 2 Days & 1 Night OST |
| "When I Could Love Someone" (사랑 할 수 있을 때) with Bobby Kim | 2011 | 43 | Spy Myung-wol OST |
"—" denotes release did not chart.
