= Oskar Kuchera =

Russian actor, TV presenter and radio host

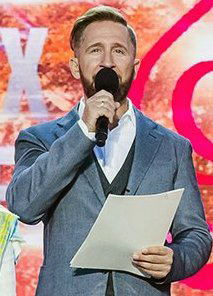
- Kuchera in 2017
- Born: Oskar Aleksandrovich Bogolyubov; 11 August 1974 (age 52); Moscow, RSFSR, Soviet Union
- Occupations: Actor, musician, TV presenter, radio host, singer
- Years active: 1995–present

Oskar Aleksandrovich Kuchera (Russian: Оскар Александрович Кучера, born Bogolyubov (Russian: Боголюбов); 11 August 1974) is a Russian actor, TV presenter and radio host. He was born in Moscow. He has made appearances in movies such as Unreal Love and Soldiers and is a presenter on Top Gear Russia. He appeared in the fourth season of ice show contest Ice Age.

== Early life ==
He was born to Tatyana Kuchera, an editor-in-chief at the Bureau of Propaganda of Motion Pictures, and Alexander Bogolubov, a director of war movies and animated films.

== Personal life ==
He is an active supporter of the Russian invasion of Ukraine.

== Selected filmography ==
- 2004: Улицы разбитых фонарей / Streets of Broken Lights (TV Series, 13 Season)
- 2005: Мужской сезон: Бархатная революция / Male Season: Velvet Revolution as Barman
- 2006–2010: Солдаты / Soldiers (TV Series, 9-16 parts) as Captain Aleksandr Kurenkov
- 2006: Русские деньги / Russian money as Apollon Murzavetskiy
- 2007: Код Апокалипсиса / The Apocalypse Code as Anton
- 2007: Руд и Сэм / Rude and Sam as Taksist
- 2008: Всё могут короли / Kings Can Do Everything as Photographer Garik
- 2011: Новые приключения Аладдина / New Adventures of Aladdin as Aladdin
- 2012: Мужской сезон 2: Время гнева / Male Season 2: Time of Wrath
- 2013: Возвращение Буратино / The Return of Buratino (Cartoon) as Buratino (voice)
- 2014: Нереальная любовь / Unreal Love as Oligarch Yuri Sokolov
- 2014: Полный вперед / Full speed ahead as Petruhin, Fedor's father
- 2017: Команда Б / Team B (TV Series, 1 season) as Gennadiy, space tourist
