= Mask (2015 TV series) =

South Korean television series from 2015

- Promotional poster
- Also known as: The Mask
- Genre: Romance; Melodrama; Family drama
- Written by: Choi Ho-chul
- Directed by: Boo Sung-chul
- Starring: Soo Ae; Ju Ji-hoon; Yeon Jung-hoon; Yoo In-young
- Composers: Kim Jun-seok; Jung Se-rin
- Country of origin: South Korea
- Original language: Korean
- No. of episodes: 20

Production
- Executive producers: Kim Yong-hoon; Shim Jung-woon
- Producers: Lee Yong-seok; Kim Dong-ho
- Cinematography: Hong Seong-gil
- Editors: Jo In-hyung; Im Ho-cheol
- Running time: 60 minutes
- Production companies: Golden Thumb Pictures; Sim Entertainment

Original release
- Network: SBS TV
- Release: May 27 – July 30, 2015

Mask (Korean: 가면; RR: Gamyeon) is a 2015 South Korean television series starring Soo Ae, Ju Ji-hoon, Yeon Jung-hoon and Yoo In-young. It aired on SBS from May 27 to July 30, 2015 on Wednesdays and Thursdays at 21:55 for 20 episodes.

== Plot ==
Byun Ji-sook is working as a sales clerk at a department store when she suddenly comes across her doppelgänger Seo Eun-ha. Whereas Ji-sook's family is hounded by loan sharks because of her father and brother's crippling debt, Eun-ha is the daughter of a congressman and fiancée of chaebol heir Choi Min-woo. Min-woo is the illegitimate son of the chairman of SJ Group and the company's presumptive heir, to the bitter resentment of the chairman's wife and her daughter, Min-woo's half-sister Mi-yeon. Despite his wealthy background, Min-woo had grown up without the love and warmth of family and friends, and his and Eun-ha's future marriage is understood by both parties to be a mutually beneficial business arrangement. He also doesn't know that the man Eun-ha is having an affair with is Mi-yeon's husband, the manipulative and ambitious Min Seok-hoon. Seok-hoon will stop at nothing to prevent his brother-in-law from being named successor, including conspiring with the latter's psychiatrist into gaslighting Min-woo and making him think he's going insane. But his plans go awry when Eun-ha ends up dead, so Seok-hoon threatens and blackmails Ji-sook into taking Eun-ha's place. As Min-woo begins to live in close quarters with Ji-sook, he is puzzled and intrigued by his new wife and how different she is from what he expected.

== Cast ==
=== Main ===
- Soo Ae as Byun Ji-sook/Seo Eun-ha

Byun Ji-sook is a sales clerk at SJ Group's department store. Seo Eun-ha (her doppelgänger) is congressman's daughter, Choi Min-woo's fiancée and Min Seok-hoon's lover.

- Ju Ji-hoon as Choi Min-woo
  - Jeon Jin-seo as young Choi Min-woo

Illegitimate son of the chairman of SJ Group. Engaged to Seo Eun-ha.

- Yeon Jung-hoon as Min Seok-hoon

Lawyer of SJ Group. Choi Mi-yeon's husband. Seo Eun-ha's lover.

- Yoo In-young as Choi Mi-yeon

Daughter of the chairman of SJ Group. Min Seok-hoon's wife.

=== Supporting ===
==== Byun Ji-sook's family ====
- Jung Dong-hwan as Byun Dae-sung, Ji-sook's father
- Yang Mi-kyung as Kang Ok-soon, Ji-sook's mother
- Hoya as Byun Ji-hyuk, Ji-sook's brother

==== Choi Min-woo's family ====
- Jeon Guk-hwan as Chairman Choi Doo-hyun, father of Choi Mi-yeon and Choi Min-woo
- Park Joon-geum as Mrs. Song Sung-hee, Choi Mi-yeon's mother

==== Seo Eun-ha's family ====
- Park Yong-soo as Congressman Seo Jong-hoon, Seo Eun-ha's father
- Lee Jong-nam as Mrs. Lee Jung-seon, congressman's wife, Seo Eun-ha's stepmother

==== Others ====
- Kim Byeong-ok as Shim Bong-seo, loan shark
- Jo Han-sun as Kim Jung-tae
- Park Yeon-soo as Myung-hwa, Byun Ji-sook's co-worker, Byun Ji-hyuk's girlfriend
- Hwang Seok-jeong as Hwang Mal-ja, Byun Ji-sook's co-worker
- Park Jun-myeon as General manager Yeo, Byun Ji-sook's supervisor
- Joo Jin-mo as Professor Kim, Choi Min-woo's doctor
- Kim Ji-min as Kim Yeon-soo, Choi Min-woo's household's maid
- Moon Sung-ho as Nam-chul, Choi Min-woo's household's butler
- Cho Yoon-woo as Oh Chang-soo, Choi Min-woo's secretary
- Oh Ha-nee as Club woman
- Sung Chang-hoon as Bbul-te ("horn-rimmed")

== Ratings ==
Episode #	Original broadcast date	Episode title	Average audience share			
Episode #	Original broadcast date	Episode title	TNmS Ratings		AGB Nielsen Ratings	
Episode #	Original broadcast date	Episode title	Nationwide	Seoul National Capital Area	Nationwide	Seoul National Capital Area
1	May 27, 2015	3 Million Won Happiness	7.5% (19th)	8.8% (13th)	7.5% (15th)	8.0% (13th)
2	May 28, 2015	Boy Who Walks in Memories	8.5% (12th)	9.8% (12th)	9.2% (10th)	9.5% (10th)
3	June 3, 2015	Best Choice, Worst Choice	8.2% (16th)	10.0% (10th)	8.6% (13th)	9.0% (13th)
4	June 4, 2015	Heaven Created by the Devil	10.3% (12th)	12.2% (7th)	10.7% (8th)	12.1% (5th)
5	June 10, 2015	The Poor Rich	9.4% (12th)	10.9% (9th)	9.4% (10th)	10.1% (7th)
6	June 11, 2015	Family, That Heartbreaking Memory	10.4% (14th)	12.6% (4th)	9.8% (11th)	10.3% (9th)
7	June 17, 2015	A Chest You Can Cry On	10.0% (11th)	12.0% (5th)	11.0% (7th)	12.5% (4th)
8	June 18, 2015	A Logical Delusion	9.8% (10th)	12.2% (5th)	11.8% (4th)	12.6% (3rd)
9	June 24, 2015	My Own Reflection	9.7% (11th)	12.6% (4th)	10.8% (6th)	11.3% (5th)
10	June 25, 2015	Faces of the Mask	10.1% (14th)	12.5% (5th)	9.7% (12th)	9.3% (12th)
11	July 1, 2015	Game of Lies	10.4% (9th)	12.9% (4th)	10.1% (7th)	10.8% (5th)
12	July 2, 2015	Unhappy Happiness	11.1% (10th)	12.8% (4th)	11.1% (6th)	11.6% (4th)
13	July 8, 2015	A Proposal and a Divorce	9.9% (13th)	12.9% (3rd)	10.8% (8th)	11.5% (5th)
14	July 9, 2015	A Spear and a Shield	10.2% (10th)	12.9% (4th)	11.1% (6th)	11.4% (4th)
15	July 15, 2015	The Target	10.0% (9th)	13.4% (3rd)	11.3% (4th)	11.5% (3rd)
16	July 16, 2015	The Puppet's Heart	11.4% (5th)	13.8% (3rd)	12.2% (3rd)	12.7% (3rd)
17	July 22, 2015	Family	9.4% (9th)	12.0% (3rd)	12.4% (5th)	13.7% (3rd)
18	July 23, 2015	Trap	11.2% (12th)	14.3% (3rd)	12.7% (3rd)	13.3% (3rd)
19	July 29, 2015	Vacancy	10.7% (9th)	13.6% (3rd)	11.5% (5th)	12.2% (4th)
20	July 30, 2015	Our House	12.6% (5th)	16.5% (2nd)	13.6% (3rd)	14.2% (3rd)
Average			10.1%	12.4%	10.8%	11.4%

Key

- Blue-lowest rating episode
- Red-highest rating episode

== Awards and nominations ==
Year	Award	Category	Recipient	Result
2015	4th APAN Star Awards	Top Excellence Award, Actress in a Miniseries	Soo Ae	Nominated
2015	4th APAN Star Awards	Popular Star Award, Actress	Yoo In-young	Won
2015	Grimae Awards	Best Drama	Mask	Won
2015	Grimae Awards	Best Actor	Yeon Jung-hoon	Won
2015	Grimae Awards	Best Actress	Soo Ae	Won
2015	23rd SBS Drama Awards	Excellence Award, Actor in a Drama Special	Ju Ji-hoon	Won
2015	23rd SBS Drama Awards	Excellence Award, Actor in a Drama Special	Yeon Jung-hoon	Nominated
2015	23rd SBS Drama Awards	Special Award, Actress in a Drama Special	Yoo In-young	Won
2015	23rd SBS Drama Awards	Top 10 Stars	Ju Ji-hoon	Won
2015	23rd SBS Drama Awards	Best Couple Award	Ju Ji-hoon and Soo Ae	Nominated
