= Nell McAndrew =

English glamour model

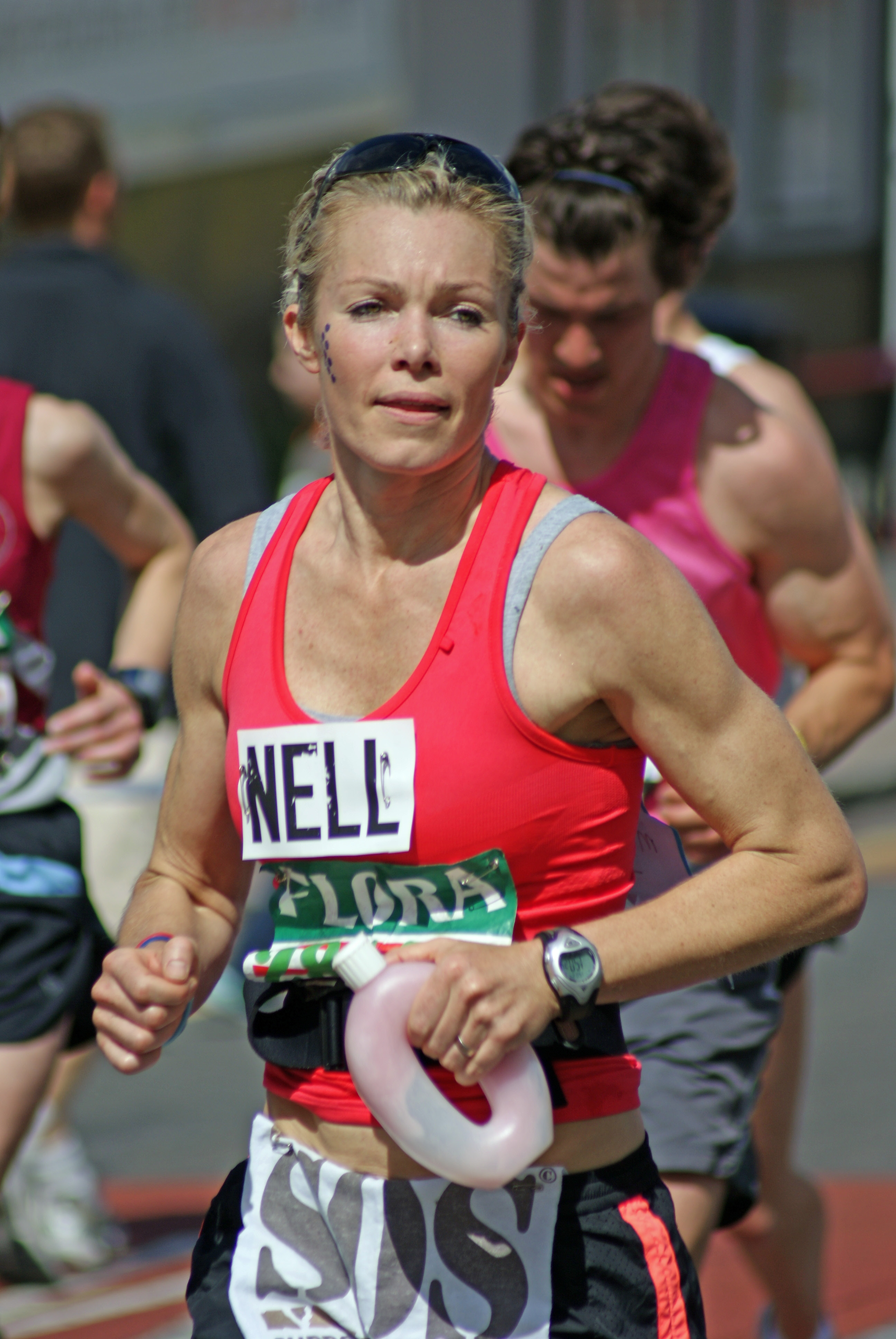
- McAndrew running the London Marathon in 2009
- Born: Tracey Jane McAndrew; 6 November 1973 (age 53); Belle Isle, Leeds, West Yorkshire, England
- Occupations: Glamour model; TV presenter; fitness trainer
- Years active: 1996–present
- Spouse: Paul Hardcastle (m. 2004)
- Modeling information
- Height: 1.75 m (5 ft 9 in)
- Hair color: Ginger
- Eye color: Green

Tracey Jane McAndrew (born 6 November 1973), known as Nell McAndrew, is an English glamour model, TV presenter and fitness trainer. She is also an accomplished amateur athlete, with a marathon personal best time of 2:54:39. She was named Yorkshire Woman of the Year in 2003 and won Rear of the Year in 2005.

== Early life ==
McAndrew was born in Leeds on 6 November 1973. She has an older sister and two younger brothers. After leaving school she briefly worked as a clerk for the Yorkshire Bank.

== Career ==
McAndrew first signed up with a modelling agency as the result of a suggestion by her hairdresser. She started her modelling career as a catalogue and magazine model and as a Marilyn Monroe lookalike. For a modelling assignment in Germany, she was required to shave her head. In the UK, she first appeared on television as one of the hostesses on the game show Man O Man in 1996. She later appeared in the Daily Star as a Page 3 girl but it was her role as the Lara Croft model for the video game Tomb Raider between 1998 and 1999 that brought her to the public's attention. McAndrew was fired from her stint as Croft in 1999 after posing nude for Playboy. This was partly due to Playboy printing references to Lara Croft and Tomb Raider on the cover, which were removed when Eidos, the maker of the game, threatened a lawsuit.

She has since enjoyed a successful career as a glamour model, frequently appearing in FHM, Maxim and Loaded. She has also appeared in fitness magazines, including Shape and Personal Trainer.

McAndrew, affectionately referred to as a forces sweetheart, has visited the British Armed Forces at bases all over the world.

She has had a television career as a presenter on Racing Rivals, Born to Fight, It's a Knockout and The Big Breakfast. She has been a contestant on various gameshows and reality shows including Fort Boyard, I'm a Celebrity...Get Me Out of Here!, Celebrities Under Pressure, Family Fortunes and Dancing on Ice.

Her first fitness video, Peak Energy was released in 2002 and became a best seller. It was followed up by Maximum Impact in December 2003 and Ultimate Challenge, Ultimate Results in December 2004.

In 2003 she was voted the Yorkshire Woman of the Year and in 2005 she won Rear of the Year.

McAndrew has been part of a number of PR campaigns for Yorkshire Water, including a digital version of her in their Sewer Raider item on the company website. She also fronted an advertising campaign for Activia Yoghurt.

In January 2009, McAndrew helped Benenden Healthcare Society, a mutual not-for-profit healthcare organisation, launch their "Fresh Start, Get on Track" campaign, appearing in nationwide radio interviews and online webchats.

== Sport ==
McAndrew's time in the 2005 London Marathon was fast enough that she qualified to run in the British Championship women's race in future events.

For the 2008 Great North Run, she competed with the fun runners dressed as Wonder Woman to help raise funds for charity.

In March 2012 McAndrew was the first woman across the finish line in the five-mile National Lottery Olympic Park Run in a personal best time of 29 minutes and 21 seconds.

With a marathon personal best time of 3:08:25, McAndrew was aiming for her first sub-three-hour marathon in the 2012 London Marathon: "2:59:59 I'd be ecstatic, but if I could get anything under 3:08 I've still got a personal best, which is still amazing, but it's just that kind of magic number of three hours ... I just want to get under that three hours." She went on to finish the race in 2:54:39, beating her previous personal best by 13 minutes and 46 seconds. Subsequently commentators Steve Cram and Brendan Foster noted that only 88 British women had run a sub-3-hour marathon during 2011. It was 47th fastest time by a British woman that year and the 9th fastest by a British woman over 35.

On 11 September 2016, she took part in the Great North Run to raise funds for Alzheimer's Society and Cancer Research UK.

Year	Competition	Venue	Position	Notes
2004	2004 London Marathon	London, UK	3376th	3:22:29
2005	2005 London Marathon	London, UK	2017th	3:10:51
2008	2008 Great North Run †	Newcastle upon Tyne, UK	579th	1:29:23
2009	2009 London Marathon	London, UK	1712th	3:10:20
2010	2010 Great North Run †	Newcastle upon Tyne, UK	312th	1:26:30
2011	2011 London Marathon	London, UK	1653rd	3:08:25
2011	2011 Great North Run †	Newcastle upon Tyne, UK	359th	1:25:11
2012	2012 Bath Half Marathon	Bath, UK	163rd	1:21:53
2012	National Lottery Olympic Park Run ‡	London, UK	56th (1st woman to finish)	29:21
2012	2012 London Marathon	London, UK	742nd ¥	2:54:39

† – half marathon
‡ – 5-mile race
¥ – of the 13,064 women who completed the race McAndrew finished 46th

== Personal life ==
After announcing their engagement in September 2004, McAndrew married property developer Paul Hardcastle twice: first in November 2004 in Huddersfield, West Yorkshire, England, then again at a marriage blessing in December 2004 in Dubai. McAndrew and her husband have a son, Devon, born on 24 August 2006.

In March 2009 she revealed that she was still breastfeeding her son, and talked about the criticisms she was receiving for this practice.

McAndrew gave birth to a second child, a daughter, in March 2013.

== Charitable activity ==
McAndrew has supported a range of charities including Breast cancer awareness, Help the Aged, the British Heart Foundation, DEBRA, Cancer Research UK, the Lymphoma Association and SSAFA. She is also a Vice president of the Leeds Rugby Foundation charity.

Launching the Cancer Research UK Race for Life 2008 in London's Regent's Park, she joined a group of other women whose training outfits were painted on their bodies.

McAndrew ran for the Alzheimer's Society in the Bupa Great North Run in Newcastle in September 2010. In March 2012 she set a personal best half marathon time of 1:21.54 whilst running for Cancer Research UK at the Bath Half Marathon.

Preceded by Vanessa Demouy	Lara Croft model 1998–1999	Succeeded by Lara Weller
