= Yeon Jung-hoon =

South Korean actor

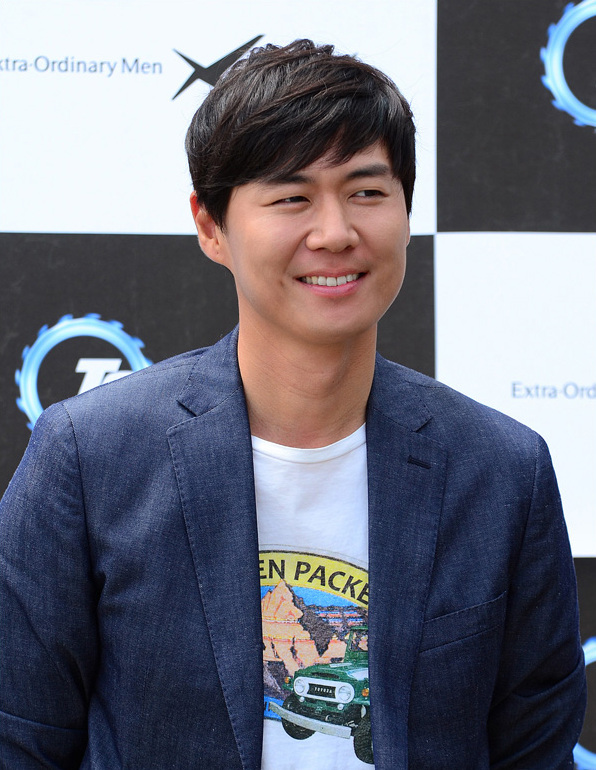
- Yeon in 2011
- Born: November 6, 1978 (age 47); Busan, South Korea
- Other name: Youn Jung-hoon
- Education: ArtCenter College of Design; Myongji University
- Years active: 1999–present
- Agent: 935 Entertainment
- Spouse: Han Ga-in (m. 2005)
- Children: 2

Korean name
- Hangul: 연정훈
- Hanja: 延政勳
- RR: Yeon Jeonghun
- MR: Yŏn Chŏnghun

Yeon Jung-hoon (born November 6, 1978) is a South Korean actor. He is best known for generational epic East of Eden (2008), crime procedural Vampire Prosecutor (2011–2012) and the domestically popular weekend drama Pots of Gold (2013). Outside of acting, Yeon hosted the first three seasons of Top Gear Korea, the South Korean version of the BBC show, and was a cast member of the popular variety-reality show 2 Days & 1 Night (2019–2024).

== Early life ==
Yeon is the only son and younger of two children of veteran actor Yeon Kyu-jin. He was sent to the United States as a teenager and lived with his aunt while attending junior high and high school. He spent his freshman year of college at the ArtCenter College of Design but returned to South Korea due to the 1997 Asian financial crisis and continued his education at Myongji University, majoring in product design. Despite his father being an actor, he never showed any inclination towards the entertainment industry until he was in college. He made his acting debut whilst a college student and eventually decided to pursue it as a career after graduating. His father had misgivings over his new career path out of concern; Yeon later stated that his father was finally convinced after he was named Best New Actor at the 2003 KBS Drama Awards.

== Career ==
=== Early career and military service: 1999–2005 ===
In 1999 Yeon made his debut in the drama Wave. After appearing in several dramas in minor or supporting roles, he first came to prominence with domestic audiences in the highly-rated 2003 daily soap Yellow Handkerchief and portrayed lovers with his future wife. They both went on to win the Best New Actor and Best New Actress awards respectively at the year-end KBS Drama Awards. He was cast in Sad Love Story as a last-minute replacement for Song Seung-heon, who was embroiled in a scandal involving his exemption from mandatory military service and forced to pull out. Yeon himself nearly did not get the role as his character's background story required him to film on location in New York City for several weeks and he had to get a visa at short notice. The drama received much attention as it was also broadcast overseas in Japan and other countries in the Middle East and Africa. Although domestic viewership was lower than expected, Yeon was praised for ably stepping into the role at the last minute and it led to a rise in popularity for him, especially in Japan. It was his last drama before enlisting for mandatory military service in November 2005.

=== Hosting Top Gear Korea and domestic popularity: 2008–2013 ===
After his discharge, Yeon began diversifying into other genres and largely shied away from romantic melodramas to avoid being typecast. His comeback project was the critically-acclaimed 2008 generational drama East of Eden in which he and Song Seung-heon portrayed brothers who grew up in a mining town during the turbulent 1970s and later find themselves on opposing sides of the law. He then starred in his first sageuk (historical period drama) Jejungwon. From 2011 to 2012, Yeon, an avid car enthusiast and former Formula 4 driver, was a co-host of Top Gear Korea and hosted the first three seasons before leaving to concentrate on acting and other interests. He also starred in the OCN legal drama Vampire Prosecutor, portraying the titular character, a prosecutor who becomes a vampire and hides his newfound powers while secretly using it to solve crimes. To prepare for the action scenes required of his role, he lost weight and learned Jeet Kune Do for several months prior to filming. The drama became the most watched cable drama of the year 2011 and received rave reviews from both critics and viewers. Its popularity prompted the producers to bring it back for a second season.

Yeon's next two roles were as chaebol businessmen in romantic comedies. In the 2012 cable drama Can Love Become Money, he played the CEO of a hospitality company who hides his sensitive and caring side behind an unpleasant and emotionless exterior. He reunited with his East of Eden co-star Han Ji-hye the following year in Pots of Gold, in which he portrayed the eldest son of a chaebol family embroiled in a saga involving his father's mistresses. A domestic ratings hit, the weekend drama consistently topped its time slot and he was named Best Actor in a Serial Drama at the 2013 MBC Drama Awards.

=== Overseas projects and 2 Days & 1 Night: 2014–present ===
Yeon's next project was the 2014 TVB microfilm A Time of Love where he played the boyfriend of Linda Chung. After mostly portraying straight-laced protagonists, he played the main antagonist in the drama Mask, winning rave reviews for his portrayal of a remorseless, cold-hearted lawyer. He was nominated for the Excellence Award, Actor in a Mid-length Drama at the 2015 SBS Drama Awards, losing to his Mask co-star Ju Ji-hoon. He made a guest appearance in the 2016 JTBC drama My Horrible Boss before making his Hollywood debut in the Hong Kong-Chinese-American collaboration buddy cop film Skiptrace and played the right-hand man of a businessman-cum-mob boss (played by Winston Chao).

Yeon returned to cable drama in the action-comedy-thriller Man to Man and played the main antagonist, an unscrupulous businessman with a painful past. He then co-headlined the weekend melodramas Bravo My Life and My Healing Love, the latter of which earned him the Top Excellence Award in a Soap Opera at the 2018 MBC Drama Awards. He returned to the supernatural genre in the cable comedy-thriller Possessed, which aired in early 2019. In November 2019, Yeon was announced as a fixed cast member of 2 Days & 1 Night for the upcoming new season. In 2020 he starred in the Channel A drama Lie After Lie with Lee Yoo-ri and it ended its run as one of the most watched cable dramas of the year.

== Personal life ==
=== Marriage and family ===
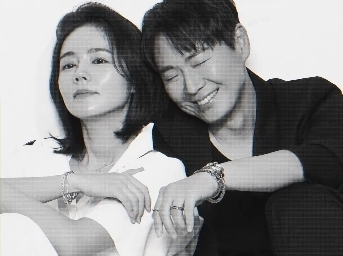
Yeon with his wife Han Ga-in for a fashion photoshoot in 2024

Yeon married actress Han Ga-in on April 26, 2005, after a two-year courtship. They have two children, a daughter (born April 13, 2016) and a son (born May 13, 2019).

=== Military service ===
In November 2005, Yeon enlisted for mandatory military service at the 306th Replacement Battalion in Uijeongbu, Gyeonggi Province. As he was married, he was allowed to commute to his duty station from home after completing the five weeks of basic training. He was assigned to the 52nd Infantry Division and discharged in October 2007. He was previously a United States permanent resident but gave up his green card when he entered the entertainment industry, thus making him eligible for conscription.

== Filmography ==
=== Film ===
Year	Title	Korean Title	Role	Notes	Ref.
2001	My Wife Is a Gangster	조폭 마누라	Hyo-min		
2005	Daddy-Long-Legs	키다리 아저씨	Kim Jun-ho		
2005	Love in Magic	연애술사	Woo Ji-hoon		
2013	Good Friends	좋은 친구들	K		
2016	Skiptrace	絕地逃亡	Willie	Chinese Film	

=== Television series ===
Year	Title	Korean Title	Role	Notes	Ref.
1999	Wave	파도			
2000	KAIST	카이스트	Yang Byung-seok		
2000	Nonstop	논스톱	Jung-hoon		
2002	Drama City: "Beautiful Youth"	아름다운 청춘	Shin Young-jae	Drama Special	
2002	Drama City: "Vienna, Like Coffee"	비엔나 커피처럼	Jun-oh	Drama Special	
2003	Drama City: "Captured Pawn"	사로잡히다	Prison guard	Drama Special	
2003	Yellow Handkerchief	노란 손수건	Yoon Tae-young		
2003	A Problem at My Younger Brother's House	흥부네 박터졌네	Jang Hyun-tae		
2003	Rosemary	로즈마리	Jang Jun-oh		
2004	Snow White: Taste Sweet Love	백설공주	Han Jin-woo		
2004	Love is All Around	사랑을 할꺼야	Yeon Ha-neul		
2005	Sad Love Story	슬픈연가	Lee Gun-woo		
2008	East of Eden	에덴의 동쪽	Lee Dong-wook		
2009	Dream	드림	Kang Ki-jang	Cameo (Episode 1)	
2010	Jejungwon	제중원	Baek Do-yang		
2011	Vampire Prosecutor	뱀파이어 검사	Min Tae-yeon		
2012	Can Love Become Money	사랑도 돈이 되나요	Ma In-tak		
2012	Vampire Prosecutor 2	뱀파이어 검사 2	Min Tae-yeon		
2013	Pots of Gold	금 나와라, 뚝딱!	Park Hyun-soo		
2014	A Time of Love	爱情来的时候	King / Kim Dong-seong	Hong Kong TV Series	
2015	Mask	가면	Min Seok-hoon		
2015	Cheo Yong 2	귀신보는 형사, 처용	Police officer	Cameo (Episode 5)	
2016	My Horrible Boss	욱씨남정기	Lee Ji-sang		
2017	Man to Man	맨투맨	Mo Seung-jae		
2017	Bravo My Life	브라보 마이 라이프	Shin Dong-woo		
2018	My Healing Love	내사랑 치유기	Choi Jin-yoo		
2019	Possessed	빙의	Oh Soo-hyeok		
2020	Lie After Lie	거짓말의 거짓말	Kang Ji-Min		

=== Television shows ===
Year	Title	Korean Title	Role	Notes	Ref.
2011	Top Gear Korea Season 1	탑 기어 코리아 시즌1	Host		
2012	Top Gear Korea Season 2	탑 기어 코리아 시즌2	Host		
2012	Top Gear Korea Season 3	탑 기어 코리아 시즌3	Host		
2019–2024	2 Days & 1 Night Season 4	1박2일	Cast member		
2022	2022 Hana Bank Seoul E-Prix	2022 하나은행 서울 E- 프리 (E-Prix)	Narrator	with Oh Eon-jong and Kim Eui-su	

== Discography ==
Album information	Track listing
몇번을 헤어져도: Track from Sad Love Story OST; Released: February 3, 2005	Track listing: 03. 몇번을 헤어져도 "No matter how many times we part" 11. 몇번을 헤어져도 (Piano Nocturn)
Yeon Jung-hoon Vol. 1: Album; Released: October 22, 2005	Track listing: 1. Intro; 2. All for you 3. 사랑이 사랑을... "Love Love..."; 4. 그대 알고 있다면 "If you knew" 5. 오늘까지만 "Just until today" 6. 사랑했기에...; 7. 고백 "Confession"; 8. 2U; 9. 같은 사랑 (Duet 장미영) "The same love" (Duet with Jang Mi-young); 10. 단 하나뿐인... "Only one" 11. All for you (MR); 12. 사랑이 사랑을... (MR); 13. 고백 (MR)

== Commercials ==
Year	Product
2003	Lotte Weezzle
2004	Union Bay
2005	KTF
2005	Haitai Vegetable-Fruit 100 Drink
2010	Samsung Hauzen Bubble Washing Machine

== Awards and nominations ==
Name of the award ceremony, year presented, category, nominee of the award, and the result of the nomination
Award ceremony	Year	Category	Nominee / Work	Result	Ref.
APAN Star Awards	2013	Best Dressed	Pots of Gold	Won	
Baeksang Arts Awards	2004	Best New Actor – Television	Yellow Handkerchief	Nominated	
Ferrari Challenge Race	2014	4th round win in Asia Pacific region	Yeon Jung-hoon	Won	
Grimae Awards	2015	Best Actor	Mask	Won	
KBS Drama Awards	2003	Best New Actor	Yellow Handkerchief	Won	
KBS Entertainment Awards	2020	Best Entertainer Award in Show/Variety Category	2 Days & 1 Night (season 4)	Won	
KBS Entertainment Awards	2021	Excellence Award, Show/Variety Category	2 Days & 1 Night (season 4)	Won	
KBS Entertainment Awards	2022	Excellence Award, Show/Variety Category	2 Days & 1 Night (season 4)	Nominated	
KBS Entertainment Awards	2022	Best Entertainer Award	2 Days & 1 Night (season 4)	Won	
MBC Drama Awards	2008	PD Award	East of Eden	Won	
MBC Drama Awards	2013	Excellence Award, Actor in a Serial Drama	Pots of Gold	Won	
MBC Drama Awards	2013	Popularity Award, Actor	Pots of Gold	Nominated	
MBC Drama Awards	2013	Best Couple Award with Han Ji-hye	Pots of Gold	Nominated	
MBC Drama Awards	2018	Top Excellence Award, Actor in a Serial Drama	My Healing Love	Won	
SBS Drama Awards	2010	Excellence Award, Actor in a Special Planning Drama	Jejungwon	Nominated	
SBS Drama Awards	2015	Excellence Award, Actor in a Mid-length Drama	Mask	Nominated	
Seoul International Drama Awards	2021	Outstanding Korean Actor	Lie After Lie	Nominated	
