= Superstar K season 1 =

Superstar K
- Season 1
- Promotional poster
- Hosted by: Im Chang-jung; Kim Sung-joo
- Judges: Lee Seung Chul; Lee Hyori; Yang Hyun-suk
- Winner: Seo In-guk
- Runner-up: Jo Moon-geun
- Finals venue: CGV Yeongdeungpo Times Square Art Hall

Release
- Original network: Mnet; KM
- Original release: July 24 – October 9, 2009

Season chronology
- Next → Superstar K 2

Superstar K is a South Korean television show on Mnet. Superstar K1 is season one of the Superstar competition series in which singers audition to get on the show. Each week, the singers perform a song and are eliminated based on the three judges' perception and audience voting.

This program began on July 24, 2009 and ended October 9, 2009 with the announcement of Seo In-guk as the winner and Jo Moon-geun as the runner-up.

== Top 10 ==
Name	Age	Place
Seo In-guk (서인국)	23	Winner
Jo Moon Geun (조문근)	25	Second
Gil Hak-mi (길학미)	21	TOP 3
Park Tae-jin (박태진)	20	TOP 4
Kim Joo Wang (김주왕)	23	TOP 5
Park Semi (박세미)	20	TOP 6
Jung Sun Gook (정선국)	23	TOP 7
Park Narae (박나래)	22	TOP 8
Lee Jin (이진)	19	TOP 9
Park Jae-eun (박재은)	20	TOP 10
