= Vanessa Demouy =

French actress and model

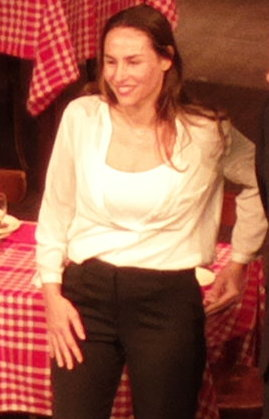
- Born: 5 April 1973 (age 53); Moulins, France
- Occupations: Model, actress

Vanessa Demouy (born 5 April 1973) is a French actress and model. She began modelling at age seventeen and later began acting.

She is primarily known for her role as Linda in a French sitcom Models in Paradise (Coeurs caraïbes). She was also the third model for Lara Croft coming after Rhona Mitra and before Nell McAndrew.

== Filmography ==
- 2017 : Chacun sa vie et son intime conviction

Preceded by Rhona Mitra	Lara Croft model 1998	Succeeded by Nell McAndrew
