= Pots of Gold =

2013 South Korean television series

- Promotional poster
- Also known as: I Summon You, Gold!; Gold, Appear!; Come Out, Gold!; Let the Gold Come Forth
- Genre: Romance; Comedy; Family; Soap opera
- Written by: Ha Chung-ok
- Directed by: Lee Hyung-sun; Choi Eun-kyung
- Starring: Han Ji-hye; Yeon Jung-hoon; Lee Tae-sung; Lee Soo-kyung
- Composers: Jo Yoon-jung; Lee Dan-bi
- Country of origin: South Korea
- Original language: Korean
- No. of episodes: 50

Production
- Executive producer: Yoon Jae-moon
- Cinematography: Jeon Byung-moon
- Editor: 153 Media
- Production company: Victory Contents

Original release
- Network: Munhwa Broadcasting Corporation
- Release: April 6 – September 22, 2013

Pots of Gold (Korean: 금 나와라, 뚝딱!; RR: Geum nawara, ttukttak!; lit. 'I Summon You, Gold!; Gold, Appear!') is a 2013 South Korean television series starring Han Ji-hye, Yeon Jung-hoon, Lee Tae-sung, Lee Soo-kyung, Baek Jin-hee, Park Seo-joon and Kim Hyung-jun. It aired on MBC from April 6 to September 22, 2013, on Saturdays and Sundays at 20:40 for 50 episodes.

The drama explores love, marriage and divorce through a case of mistaken identity, while making good-humored fun of a middle-class family and their pretensions.

== Plot ==
Mong-hee and Yoo-na are two different women who look exactly the same, so much so that they could be twins. Mong-hee is a cheerful and hardworking street vendor who sells accessories and dreams of becoming a jewelry designer. On the other hand, Yoo-na is the cold daughter-in-law of a wealthy chaebol family.

Yoo-na has just gone through a divorce with Park Hyun-soo. Hyun-soo's parents own a jewelry company, which he is due to inherit as the eldest son. But his younger brother Hyun-joon wants the CEO position for himself, and he schemes to gain control of the family business, along with his wife, Sung-eun, a successful jewelry designer.

When Hyun-soo meets Mong-hee, he gets a real chance to find love and happiness, but the fact that she looks exactly like his ex-wife might become a problem, as he asks her to pose as his wife. Mong-hee soon finds herself caught up in a power struggle within the Park family and also discovers the tragedy behind her and Yoo-na's births.

== Cast ==
=== Main characters ===
- Han Ji-hye as Jung Mong-hee / Son Yoo-na
  - A gifted jewelry designer, Mong-hee is the eldest child of Jung Byung-hoo and Yoon Shim-deok. Due to her family's precarious financial situation and having two younger siblings, she was forced to drop out of college so that her siblings could attend. She meets the Park family as her mother is a long-time employee of their company and soon uncovers the tragic secret behind her and Yoo-na's births.
  - Yoo-na is the wife of Park Hyun-soo. She is a chaebol heiress who was arranged to marry him in a politically and financially motivated union. Having grown up in a wealthy but uncaring environment, she has difficulty empathizing with others and her cold and aloof mannerisms put off those around her, leading to her feeling lonely and depressed.
- Yeon Jung-hoon as Park Hyun-soo
  - The eldest son of Park Soon-sang who is due to succeed his father as the CEO. His biological mother Jin-sook (Soon-sang's ex-wife) was thrown out of the house for allegedly having an extramarital affair and Hyun-soo grew up under his father's live-in mistress and de facto stepmother Jang Deok-hee, the domineering and manipulative biological mother of his younger half-brother Hyun-joon.
- Lee Tae-sung as Park Hyun-joon
  - The ambitious son of Soon-sang and Deok-hee who works for the family company. He and his wife were constantly scheming ways to take over the company from Hyun-soo. Being an illegitimate child, he always felt like he was in the shadows of his older brother and tries hard to win his father's approval. His ambitious mother would stop at nothing in pressuring him to climb up the ladder at work but unlike her, Hyun-joon also values his relationship with his brothers and his marriage to Sung-eun and has to toe a very thin line between power and family.
- Lee Soo-kyung as Min Sung-eun
  - Mong-hee's rival from their college days is the Head of Design at her husband's family company. She had been harboring a secret from her husband and Mong-hee's appearance could mean that the secret would be exposed.
- Baek Jin-hee as Jung Mong-hyun
  - The youngest of Byung-hoo and Shim-deok's three children. She initially dates wealthy playboy Hyun-tae merely to satisfy her mother's desire for her to marry into a chaebol family but they eventually fall in love and get married. Her kind nature and simple lifestyle contrast starkly with that of her sophisticated and often aloof sisters-in-law.
- Park Seo-joon as Park Hyun-tae
  - The carefree and happy-go-lucky youngest son of Park Soon-sang. His biological mother Min Young-ae, another of Sang-soon's mistresses, chose to send him to live with his father for financial reasons and better prospects. While growing up he learned to keep a low profile so that he won't be thrown out by Deok-hee, who despises him and treats him coldly. He is coddled by his father and older brothers and longs to experience life outside of the wealthy upper-class circle that his family belongs to.
- Kim Hyung-jun as Jung Mong-kyu
  - Byung-hoo and Shim-deok's only son who has graduated from college but is still jobless. Much to his parents' chagrin, he continues to be half-hearted and directionless when job-hunting and relies on his mother for pocket money. Eventually circumstances force him to take responsibility for his own actions.

=== Supporting characters ===
Mong-hee's family

- Choi Myung-gil as Yoon Shim-deok
- Kil Yong-woo as Jung Byung-hoo, Shim-deok's husband
- Ban Hyo-jung as Kim Pil-nyeo, Byung-hoo's mother
- Choi Ju-bong as Jung Pan-geum, husband of Pil-nyeo
- Kim Ji-young as Choi Kwang-soon, Shim-deok's mother
- Kim Kwang-kyu as Jung Byung-dal, Byung-hoo's younger brother
- Jo Eun-sook as Haeng-ja, Byung-dal's wife
- Kim Dan-yul as Jung Doo-ri, Byung-dal and Haeng-ja's son

Hyun-soo's family

- Han Jin-hee as Park Soon-sang, family patriarch and CEO of Noble Diamond
- Lee Kyung-jin as Jin-sook, Hyun-soo's biological mother and Soon-sang's first wife
- Lee Hye-sook as Jang Deok-hee, biological mother of Soon-sang's second son Hyun-joon who is constantly scheming ways to secure power and help her son get ahead
- Geum Bo-ra as Min Young-ae, biological mother of Soon-sang's third son Hyun-tae who is "frenemies" with her rival Deok-hee

Extended cast

- Kim Ye-won as Kwak Min-jung, Mong-kyu's girlfriend
- Park Min-ha as Jin Ah-ram
- Han Bo-reum as Lee Min-ah
- Kim Da-hyun as Jin Sang-chul
- Lee Ga-ryeong as Customer of cosmetics store
- Kim Byeong-ok as Hwang Jong-pal
- Jeon Soo-kyeong

== Awards and nominations ==
Year	Award	Category	Recipient	Result
2013	Mnet 20's Choice Awards	20's Booming Star - Female	Baek Jin-hee	Nominated
2013	Korea Drama Awards	Best New Actor	Park Seo-joon	Won
2013	APAN Star Awards	Excellence Award, Actress	Han Ji-hye	Nominated
2013	APAN Star Awards	Best New Actor	Park Seo-joon	Nominated
2013	MBC Drama Awards	Drama of the Year	Pots of Gold	Nominated
2013	MBC Drama Awards	Top Excellence Award, Actress in a Serial Drama	Han Ji-hye	Won
2013	MBC Drama Awards	Excellence Award, Actor in a Serial Drama	Yeon Jung-hoon	Won
2013	MBC Drama Awards	Golden Acting Award, Actress	Choi Myung-gil	Nominated
2013	MBC Drama Awards	Golden Acting Award, Actress	Geum Bo-ra	Nominated
2013	MBC Drama Awards	Golden Acting Award, Actress	Lee Hye-sook	Won
2013	MBC Drama Awards	Best New Actor	Park Seo-joon	Nominated
2013	MBC Drama Awards	Lifetime Achievement Award	Han Jin-hee	Won

== International broadcast ==
It aired in Thailand on PPTV beginning July 25, 2014 and also aired in Myanmar on MNTV. The show aired in Singapore on Channel U starting in August 2015.
