= Top Gear (2011 TV series) =

- Genre: Motoring
- Created by: Hunan TV
- Presented by: Cao Yunjin; Huang Zheng; Li Rui
- Country of origin: China
- Original language: Mandarin
- No. of seasons: 1
- No. of episodes: 30

Production
- Running time: approx. 30 minutes
- Production company: BBC Worldwide

Original release
- Network: Hunan TV
- Release: April 23 – December 27, 2011

Related
- Top Gear worldwide

Top Gear or Zuigaodang is a 2011 Chinese Hunan TV TV series adopting the format as made popular in the 2002 Top Gear reboot, Zuigaodang best translates into "Highest Gear". The attempt is noted as being a toned down version of its British counterpart, and usually ran about 30 minutes in length.

== History ==
In February 2011, rumors started circulating that the Chinese TV station, CCTV, was looking to adapt the Top Gear format for the local market. The following week, it was confirmed that not only were they looking to adapt, but had in fact already finished a pilot, by host Cao Yunjin. Cao Yunjin went on to reveal that the pilot episode included a race between a Cadillac and a donkey to see which would be better suited and more efficient as farming equipment, he continued that they would not be able to emulate many of that which had made the original famous, but that they would still be doing "fun" stuff. After almost a month of no further development, the first fifteen minutes of the pilot was uploaded to YouTube, but was swiftly taken down by BBC Worldwide. While it was largely reported to have been made for CCTV, the eventual series premiered on Hunan TV on the 23rd of April 2011, and featured Huang Zheng, Cao Yunjin, and Li Rui as hosts, and also featured a local version of The Stig.

== Episodes ==
Episode Number	Air Date
01	23 April 2011
02	7 May 2011
03	14 May 2011
04	21 May 2011
05	28 May 2011
06	11 June 2011
07	3 July 2011
08	10 July 2011
09	17 July 2011
10	24 July 2011
11	31 July 2011
12	7 August 2011
13	14 August 2011
14	21 August 2011
15	28 August 2011
16	4 September 2011
17	11 September 2011
18	16 September 2011
19	25 September 2011
20	9 October 2011
21	16 October 2011
22	23 October 2011
23	30 October 2011
24	6 November 2011
25	13 November 2011
26	27 November 2011
27	4 December 2011
28	11 December 2011
29	18 December 2011
30	27 December 2011
