= Top Gear Russia =

- Title card
- Genre: Motoring
- Created by: BBC Worldwide
- Developed by: REN-TV
- Presented by: Nikolai Fomenko; Mikhail Petrovsky; Oskar Kuchera
- Theme music composer: Dickey Betts
- Opening theme: "Jessica"
- Country of origin: Russia
- Original language: Russian
- No. of series: 1

Production
- Executive producer: Cameron Miller
- Producers: BBC Worldwide; Ren-TV
- Production location: Moscow
- Running time: 60 minutes (w/ commercials)

Original release
- Network: Ren-TV
- Release: 22 February – 25 October 2009

Related
- Top Gear (2002 TV series); Top Gear Australia; Top Gear (US); Top Gear Korea

Top Gear Russia (Russian: Top Gear: Русская версия, romanized: Top Gear: Russkaya versiya, lit. 'Top Gear: Russian Version') is a Russian motoring television series that ran on Ren-TV, and was based on the British program Top Gear produced by the BBC. It premiered on 22 February 2009. The show was cancelled due to low ratings and aired for the last time on 25 October 2009.

== Presenters ==
The hosts of Top Gear Russia were:

- Nikolai Fomenko, former musician (as part of the band Secret), former race car driver, theater actor and TV presenter. He is also involved in the creation of the Russian supercar Marussia.
- Mikhail Petrovsky, actor, automotive journalist and blogger.
- Oskar Kuchera, ex-MTV Russia presenter and actor.
- The Stig, a local version of the mysterious driver from the original British show.

== Segments ==
=== Power Lap ===
Similar to the original UK series, Top Gear Russia features a Power Lap segment, in this case held in an abandoned airfield in Mnyovniki. To inaugurate the track and populate the lap board in the first episode, the hosts invited numerous local celebrities to participate and treated them to a picnic with shashlyk and a smoking samovar.

==== Lap times ====
Pos	Time	Car	Conditions
1	1:12.00	(Germany) Porsche 911 Turbo Cabriolet	damp
2	1:12.96	(Japan) Nissan GT-R	wet
3	1:13.16	(Germany) 1985 Porsche 911 Turbo	damp
4	1:13.88	(United Kingdom) Bentley Continental GT Speed	damp and icy
5	1:14.00	(Germany) Alpina B3	moist
6	1:14.83	(Italy) Lamborghini Gallardo	some snow+summer tyres
7	1:16.85	(United Kingdom) Aston Martin V8 Vantage Roadster	damp
8	1:17.85	(United Kingdom) Aston Martin DB9	wet
9	1:19.00	(Italy) Ferrari 550M	
10	1:21.01	(United Kingdom) Range Rover Sport	damp
11	1:22.12	(Japan) Mazda MX-5	damp
12	1:22.27	(Italy) Fiat 500	
13	1:49.17	(Sweden) Volvo XC90	snow
14	2:08.71	(United Kingdom) Land Rover Defender 90 SVX soft top	ice+snow
15	2:15.93	(Russia) UAZ 469 Off-Road modified	ice+snow
16	2:23.25	(Germany) Audi R8	snow
17	DNF	(Italy) Ferrari F430	snow

=== Star in a Reasonably Priced Car ===
The Star in a Reasonably-Priced Car segment are mirrored with Russia's own version. The car used is a race-prepped Lada Kalina. Unlike in the UK version of Top Gear, the lap format for this segment is different from that of the Stig's power laps.

=== Cool Wall ===
Introduced in episode 2 of season 1, the Cool Wall mirrors the popular segment from the UK original.
