= Top Gear Korea =

- Title card
- Genre: Motoring
- Directed by: Seo Seung-han
- Presented by: Kim Jin-pyo (2011–); Yeon Jung-hoon (2011–2012); Kim Kap-soo (2011); Jo Min-ki (2012); Park Jun-gyu (2012); Ryu Si-won (2013); Danny Ahn (2013–2014); Alex Chu (2013–2014); Yoo Kyung-wook (2014–2015); Ahn Jung-hwan (2016–); Hong Jong-hyun (2016–); Park Young-woong (2016–) "The Stig" (Woo Young Wooyi)
- Opening theme: "Jessica"
- Ending theme: "Jessica"
- Composer: Dickey Betts
- Countries of origin: South Korea; United Kingdom
- Original language: Korean
- No. of series: 7
- No. of episodes: 71

Production
- Running time: 60 minutes
- Production company: CJ E&M; BBC

Original release
- Network: XTM, TVN
- Release: 20 August 2011 – present

Related
- Top Gear (2002 TV series); Top Gear (USA); Top Gear Australia; Top Gear Russia

Top Gear Korea (Korean: 탑 기어 코리아) is the South Korean adaptation of BBC's popular Top Gear show. Officially announced on 21 June 2011, the show follows a similar format with the British version and season 1 included 3 presenters: singer and professional driver Kim Jin-pyo, actor Yeon Jung-hoon), and actor Kim Kap-soo. It premiered on cable channel XTM on 20 August 2011.

The show uses a circuit in Ansan, which is not used for racing but just for tests and social events, as the main test facility and Power Lap Time. It was built for Champ Car event that was cancelled less than three weeks before it was to be held. Korea International Circuit, the venue of the Korean Grand Prix and Taebaek Racing Park are used for some episodes.

== History ==
The first season aired from 20 August – 30 December 2011. Met with both positive and negative reviews, the show had a peak viewership rating of 1.28%, considered to be quite good for Korean cable.

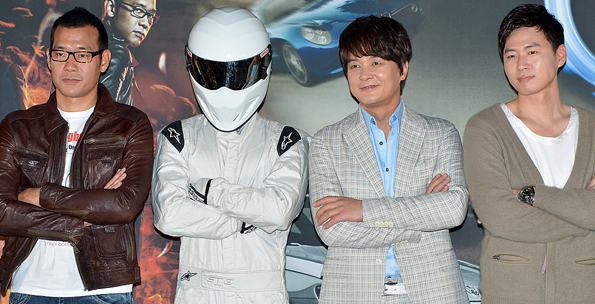
Presenters and The Stig of Top Gear Korea Season 2.

The second season aired from 8 April 2012 to 17 June 2012. Kim Kap-soo was replaced by actor Jo Min-ki.

The third season (titled Top Gear Korea New Season) aired from 7 October – 16 December 2012. Jo Min-ki was replaced by actor Park Jun-gyu. In one of the episodes, presenter Kim Jin-pyo drove a Chevrolet Spark through a 360-degree vertical loop.

A serious incident occurred during filming of the fourth season, in which a helicopter crashed into the Arizona desert. As part of a racing sequence between a Chevrolet Corvette C6 ZR1 and a Bell AH-1 Cobra helicopter, the car and the helicopter would race alongside each other to the finish line. During a practice run, as they reached the finish line, the aircraft wheeled around 180° before impacting the ground. Nobody was seriously injured. The BBC posted the video online, both in its unaltered state and open-captioned in English, the show is part of their franchise and is co-produced by the company.

== Guests ==
Guests are featured each week in the Star Lap Time segment, akin to Star in a Reasonably Priced Car. The car driven in this segment is the Volkswagen Golf.

=== Season 1 ===
| Celebrities | Notes |
|---|---|
| Kim Soo-ro | Kim Su-ro's timing was 2:07.06. He was the first celebrity to be featured in this segment. |
| Kim Ok-vin | Kim Ok-bin's timing was 2:00.56. |
| 2AM's Jo Kwon and Seulong | Jo Kwon's timing was 2:08.36, while Seulong's timing was 2:04.56. |
| Alex | |
| H.O.T's Tony An and Moon Hee-jun | Tony's timing was 2:01.16, while Moon Hee-jun's timing was 1:58.93. |
| Ahn Jae-mo | Ahn Jae-mo's timing was 1:57.00. |
| Lee Won-jong | Lee Won-jong's timing was 2:01.96. |
| Boom | Boom's timing was 1:59.83. |
| Kim Min-jun | |
| Lee Se-chang | Lee Se-chang's timing was 1:57.83. |
| Haha | Haha's timing was 2:00.53. |
| Huh Gak | Huh Gak's timing was 2:01.16. |

=== Season 2 ===
| Episode | Celebrities | Notes |
|---|---|---|
| Episode 1 | Lee Sung-jae | Lee Sung-jae's timing was 2:02.15. |
| Episode 2 | Song Seon-mi | |
| Episode 3 | Koyote's Shinji and Bbaeka | Bbaeka's timing was 2:03.02. |
| Episode 4 | Ryu Soo-young | |
| Episode 5 | g.o.d's Danny Ahn | Danny's timing was 1.58.07. |
| Episode 6 | 4Minute's Kim Hyun-a and Heo Ga-yoon | Ga-yoon's timing of 2:00.15 makes her the fastest female celebrity on the show for Seasons 1 – 3. |
| Episode 7 | g.o.d's Son Ho-young | Son Ho-young's timing was 1:57.06. |
| Episode 8 | Lee Chun-hee | Lee Chun-hee's timing was 1:59.05. |
| Episode 9 | Park Jun-gyu | Park Jun-gyu's timing was 1:59.11. |
| Episode 10 | SISTAR's Bora | Bora's fellow group member Dasom appeared on the show but did not drive. |

=== Season 3 ===
| Episode | Celebrities | Notes |
|---|---|---|
| Episode 1 | Yoo Seung-ho | Yoo Seung-ho's timing of 1:58.20 made him the fastest driver of season 3. |
| Episode 2 | Choi Yeo-jin | Choi Yeo-jin's timing was 2:01.24. |
| Episode 3 | Kim Hee-won | |
| Episode 4 | Park Eun-ji | Park Eun-ji's timing was 2:13.13. |
| Episode 6 | Kim Jung-tae | Kim Jung-tae's timing was 2:01.28. |
| Episode 7 | Kim So-eun | Kim So-eun's timing of 2:01.19 made her the 3rd fastest female participant, after Heo Ga-yoon and Kim Ok-bin. |
| Episode 9 | Jung Jun-ha | |

=== Season 4 ===
| Episode | Celebrities | Notes |
|---|---|---|
| Episode 1 | Kim Min-jong | Kim Min-jong's timing was 2:01.22. |
| Episode 2 | Park Shin-hye | Park Shin-hye's timing was 2:00.14. |
| Episode 5 | Lee Jung | Lee Jung's timing was 1:55.25. |
