= 2NE1 discography =

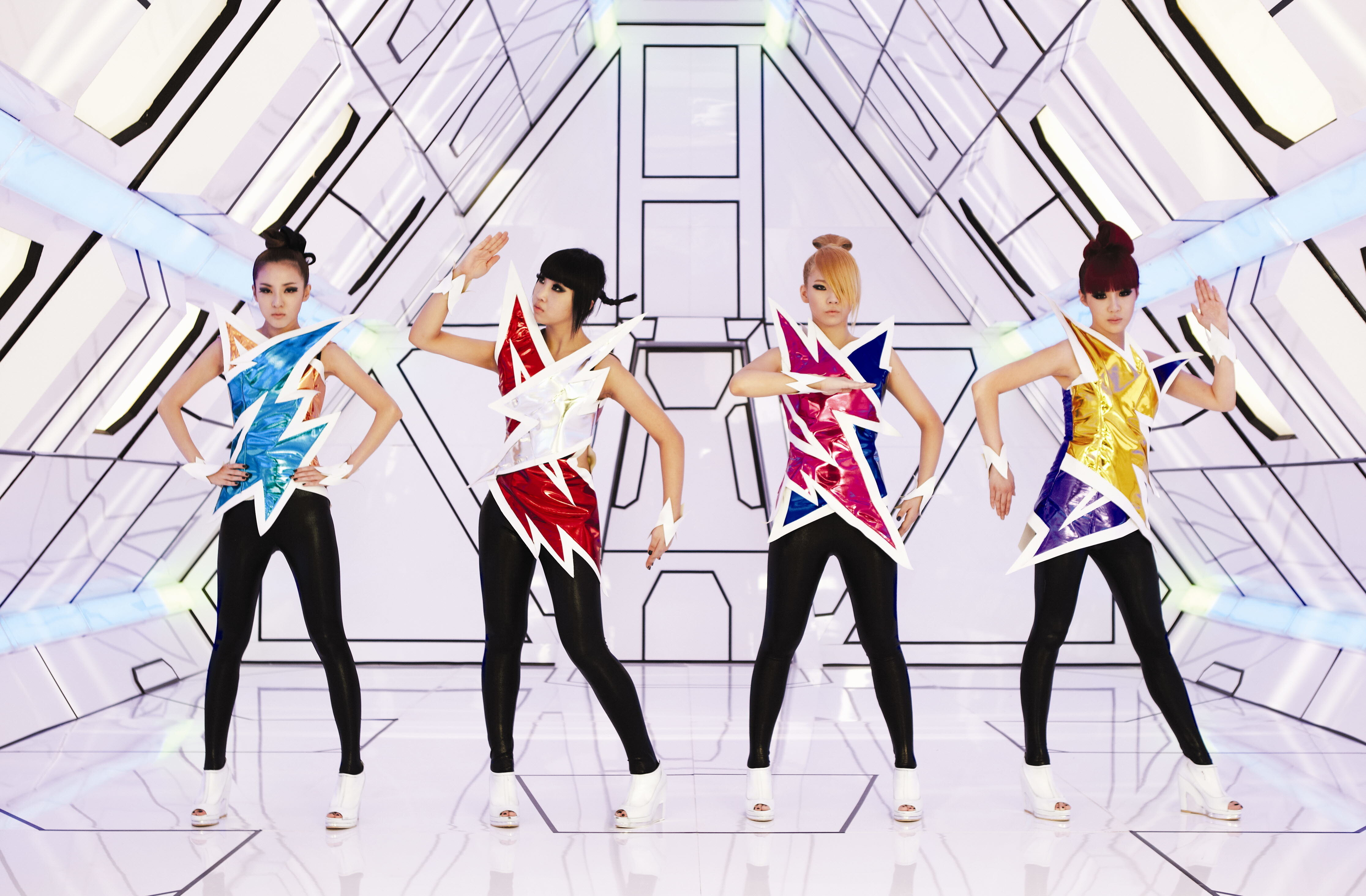
- 2NE1 promoting "Can't Nobody"
- Studio albums: 2
- Extended plays: 2
- Live albums: 3
- Compilation albums: 4
- Singles: 18
- Music videos: 27
- Promotional singles: 2

2NE1 is a South Korean girl group signed to YG Entertainment, with members CL, Bom, Dara, and Minzy making up the quartet. Their discography consists of two studio albums, two extended plays, eighteen singles and two promotional singles. The group established themselves in the Korean music scene in March 2009, with the release of the LG Cyon promotional single "Lollipop", a collaboration with label mates Big Bang. It brought the group instant recognition in South Korea and would receive over 3,000,000 downloads in the country.

"Fire" served as 2NE1's official debut single and was released to digital outlets on May 6, 2009. It served as the first single for their debut extended play 2NE1 1st Mini Album, which was released on July 8, 2009. The EP was named the best-selling record by a female group on the Korean Hanteo chart during 2009 and would sell over 220,000 copies by 2016. "I Don't Care" served as the lead single during this period, which reached number one on domestic charts and was one of the top downloaded songs of the year. After 2NE1 1st Mini Album, the group released a series of their own solo singles: "Kiss", "You and I", and the duet track "Please Don't Go".

In February 2010, the group released their second promotional single in support for their Samsung Corby CF, "Try to Follow Me". 2NE1 released their first full-length studio album To Anyone on September 9, 2010, where it became the number-one album of the month and would sell over 167,000 copies. It was anchored by the "triple" singles "Clap Your Hands", "Go Away" and "Can't Nobody", with promotions for "It Hurts (Slow)" beginning afterwards in October. The members' solo singles from the previous year were also included on the album.

"Don't Stop the Music" was 2NE1's first official international release because it was meant as a "special gift for Thai fans". On July 28, 2011, the group released their second extended play 2NE1 2nd Mini Album, which spawned several hits such like "Lonely", "I Am the Best" and "Ugly"; all three songs reached number one on Gaon and garnered over 3,000,000 downloads in South Korea. Following the release of their Japanese compilation album Collection in March 2012, the group returned to Korean music charts with the chart-topping release of their single "I Love You" that July.

2NE1's sophomore Korean studio album, Crush, was released on February 27, 2014. Within four days, the album sold over 5,000 copies in the United States and charted at number 61 on the Billboard 200 in its first week of release. In doing so, the album broke two records: the best-selling K-pop album and the highest-charting K-pop album on the Billboard 200, which would hold the latter record for two and a half years until BTS's Wings. The album yielded the singles "Come Back Home" and "Gotta Be You", with the former single becoming the group's ninth number-one single on the Gaon Digital Chart, continuing the record for most number-one songs among idol groups at the time.

Following a two-year hiatus of group activities, YG Entertainment announced that 2NE1 would be disbanding in November 2016. As a farewell gift to their fans, 2NE1 released their final single "Goodbye" on January 21, 2017, featuring only the three remaining members CL, Bom, and Dara since Minzy left YG Entertainment in April 2016. In total, the group has reportedly sold 66.5 million digital and physical, records worldwide, making them one of the best-selling girl groups of all time.

== Albums ==
=== Studio albums ===
List of studio albums
Title	Album details	Peak chart positions								Sales
Title	Album details	KOR	FRA Dig.	JPN	JPN Sales	UK Indie	US	US Indie	US World	Sales
To Anyone	Released: September 9, 2010 (KOR); Label: YG Entertainment; Formats: CD, digital download, streaming	1	—	27	—	—	—	—	7	KOR: 168,710; JPN: 17,000
Crush	Released: February 27, 2014 (KOR) June 25, 2014 (JPN); Label: YG Entertainment, YGEX; Formats: CD, digital download, streaming	2	65	4 (Note: The Korean version of Crush originally peaked at number 26; the Japanese version reached a peak of number 4 in June 2014.)	7	42	61	9	2	KOR: 71,236; JPN: 36,000; US: 10,000
"—" denotes releases that did not chart or were not released in that region.

=== Live albums ===
List of Korean live albums
Title	Album details	Peak chart positions		Sales
Title	Album details	KOR	JPN	Sales
2NE1 1st Live Concert (Nolza!)	Released: November 23, 2011 (KOR); Label: YG Entertainment; Formats: CD, DVD, digital download	4	8	KOR: 23,000; JPN: 6,110
2012 2NE1 Global Tour: New Evolution	Released: December 4, 2012 (KOR); Label: YG Entertainment; Formats: CD, DVD, digital download	5	15	KOR: 11,000
2014 2NE1 World Tour: All or Nothing	Released: May 23, 2014 (KOR); Label: YG Entertainment; Formats: CD, DVD, digital download	5	8	KOR: 6,649

=== Compilation albums ===
List of compilation albums
Title	Album details	Peak chart positions			Sales
Title	Album details	KOR	JPN	JPN Sales	Sales
Collection	Released: March 28, 2012 (JPN); Label: YGEX; Formats: CD, digital download	—	5	5	JPN: 50,000
2NE1 Best Collection -Korea Edition-	Released: December 10, 2014 (JPN); Label: YGEX; Format: Digital download	—	—	—	
Welcome Back	Released: December 25, 2024 (JPN); Label: YGEX; Format: CD, digital download	—	17	12	JPN: 6,704
2NE1 15th Anniversary Best LP	Released: March 31, 2025 (KOR); Label: YG; Format: LP (limited edition)	17	—	—	KOR: 9,407
"—" denotes releases that did not chart or were not released in that region.

== Extended plays ==
List of extended plays
Title	Details	Peak chart positions					Sales
Title	Details	KOR	JPN	JPN Sales	US Heat	US World	Sales
2NE1 1st Mini Album	Released: July 8, 2009 (KOR) March 16, 2011 (JPN); Label: YG Entertainment, YGEX; Formats: CD, digital download	1	24	28	—	—	KOR: 225,301; JPN: 7,200
2NE1 2nd Mini Album	Released: July 28, 2011 (KOR) September 21, 2011 (JPN); Label: YG Entertainment, YGEX; Formast: CD, digital download	1	1 (Note: The Korean version originally peaked at number 16; the Japanese version reached a peak of number 1 in September 2011.)	2	34	4	KOR: 114,406; JPN: 57,000
"—" denotes releases that did not chart or were not released in that region.

== Singles ==
List of singles
Title	Year	Peak chart positions							Sales	Certifications	Album
Title	Year	KOR (Note: The Gaon Digital Chart was first published in 2010.)	KOR Hot (Note: The K-pop Hot 100 was first published on August 25, 2011. Chart data was temporarily discontinued from May 2014 to June 2017.)	FRA	JPN	JPN Hot	UK Indie	US World	Sales	Certifications	Album
"Fire"	2009	*	*	—	—	—	—	—	—N/a	—N/a	2NE1 1st Mini Album
"I Don't Care"	2009	112 (Note: Charted in 2024.)	*	—	—	—	—	—	—N/a	—N/a	2NE1 1st Mini Album
"Clap Your Hands" (박수쳐)	2010	3	*	—	—	—	—	4	KOR: 1,841,000	—N/a	To Anyone
"Go Away" (Note: Released as two singles, the first was released in Korean in 2010 while the second was released in Japanese in 2011.)	2010	1	*	—	12	14	—	6	KOR: 2,917,000; KOR: 547,000 (rt.); JPN: 21,150 (phy.)	—N/a	To Anyone
"Can't Nobody"	2010	2	*	—	—	—	—	2	KOR: 2,550,000; KOR: 105,000 (rt.)	—N/a	To Anyone
"It Hurts (Slow)" (아파)	2010	4	*	—	—	—	—	7	KOR: 1,840,000	—N/a	To Anyone
"Lonely"	2011	1	*	—	—	—	—	—	KOR: 3,040,000	—N/a	2NE1 2nd Mini Album
"I Am the Best" (내가 제일 잘 나가)	2011	1	12	61	—	53	44	1	WW: 4,500,000 (Note: Total worldwide sales figures including South Korea for "I Am the Best" as of October 2012.); KOR: 3,652,000; US: 12,000; JPN: 100,000	RIAJ: Gold	2NE1 2nd Mini Album
"Hate You"	2011	3	4	—	—	—	—	2	KOR: 2,577,000	—N/a	2NE1 2nd Mini Album
"Ugly"	2011	1	2	—	—	18	—	2	KOR: 3,300,000	—N/a	2NE1 2nd Mini Album
"Scream" (Japanese version)	2012	—	—	—	14	18	—	—	JPN: 7,000 (phy.)	—N/a	Collection
"I Love You" (Note: Released as two singles in 2012, the first was released in Korean in July while the second was released in Japanese in September.)	2012	1	1	—	5	29	—	3	KOR: 2,883,000; JPN: 15,700 (phy.); US: 5,000	—N/a	Non-album singles
"Falling in Love"	2013	1	2	—	—	—	— (Note: "Falling in Love" peaked at number 12 on the UK Independent Singles Breakers chart.)	4	KOR: 885,000	—N/a	Non-album singles
"Do You Love Me"	2013	3	2	—	—	—	—	4	KOR: 638,000	—N/a	Non-album singles
"Missing You" (그리워해요)	2013	1	2	—	—	—	— (Note: "Missing You" peaked at number 14 on the UK Independent Singles Breakers chart.)	2	KOR: 1,083,000	—N/a	Non-album singles
"Come Back Home"	2014	1	2	—	—	—	—	4	KOR: 1,300,000	—N/a	Crush
"Gotta Be You" (너 아님 안돼)	2014	3	4	—	—	—	—	16	KOR: 931,000	—N/a	Crush
"Goodbye" (안녕)	2017	23	*	109	—	—	—	1	KOR: 160,000; US: 5,000	—N/a	Non-album single
"—" denotes releases that did not chart or were not released in that region.

=== Promotional singles ===
List of promotional singles
Title	Year	Peak chart positions		Sales	Album
Title	Year	KOR	US World	Sales	Album
"Lollipop" (with Big Bang)	2009	—	—	KOR: 3,000,000	2NE1 1st Mini Album
"Try to Follow Me" (날 따라 해봐요)	2010	1	—	KOR: 1,703,000	To Anyone
"Don't Stop the Music" (Yamaha Fiore version)	2010	25	10	KOR: 618,778	2NE1 2nd Mini Album
"—" denotes releases that did not chart or were not released in that region.

== Other charted songs ==
List of other charted songs
Title	Year	Peak chart positions				Sales	Album
Title	Year	KOR	KOR Hot	JPN	US World	Sales	Album
"Kiss" (Dara featuring CL)	2009	73	*	—	—	—N/a	To Anyone
"You and I" (Bom solo)	2009	36	*	—	—	KOR: 1,002,336 (Note: Sales figures for "You and I" in 2010 and first week of May 2011.)	To Anyone
"Please Don't Go" (CL and Minzy)	2009	30	*	—	—	—N/a	To Anyone
"I'm Busy" (난 바빠)	2010	14	*	—	—	KOR: 902,101	To Anyone
"Love Is Ouch" (사랑은 아야야)	2010	13	*	—	—	KOR: 903,293	To Anyone
"I Don't Care" (Reggae remix)	2010	92	*	—	—	—N/a	To Anyone
"Can't Nobody" (English version)	2010	84	*	—	—	—N/a	To Anyone
"Like a Virgin"	2012	—	—	79	—	—N/a	Collection
"Crush" (Japanese version)	2014	—	—	20	—	—N/a	Crush
"Crush" (Korean version)	2014	7	9	—	7	KOR: 487,941	Crush
"If I Were You" (살아 봤으면 해)	2014	8	7	—	24	KOR: 806,471	Crush
"Good to You" (착한 여자)	2014	11	11	—	—	KOR: 344,805	Crush
"Happy"	2014	14	17	—	15	KOR: 371,207	Crush
"MTBD" (멘붕) (CL solo)	2014	15	35	—	9	KOR: 647,690	Crush
"Scream" (Korean version)	2014	17	18	—	20	KOR: 327,020	Crush
"Baby I Miss You"	2014	16	22	—	—	KOR: 281,236	Crush
"Come Back Home" (Unplugged version)	2014	28	39	—	—	KOR: 94,173	Crush
"—" denotes releases that did not chart or were not released in that region.

== Guest appearances ==
2NE1 guest appearances
Title	Year	Note	Album
"Be Mine"	2012	Intel Make Thumb Noise Project (English song)	—N/a
"She's So (Outta Control)" (M-Flo featuring 2NE1)	2012	Japanese song	Square One
"Take the World On"	2013	Intel Ultrabook Project (English song)	—N/a
"Gettin' Dumb" (will.i.am featuring apl.de.ap and 2NE1)	2013	English song	#willpower

== Video releases ==
List of video releases
Title	Album details
1st Live Concert Nolza! Live in Seoul	Released: December 21, 2011; Label: YG Entertainment; Format: DVD
1st Japan Tour Nolza in Japan	Released: February 29, 2012; Label: YGEX; Format: DVD
2NE1 TV Season 1 Box	Released: March 21, 2012; Label: YGEX; Format: DVD
2NE1 TV Season 2 Box	Released: March 21, 2012; Label: YGEX; Format: DVD
New Evolution Global Tour in Seoul	Released: January 16, 2013; Label: YG Entertainment; Format: DVD
2NE1 TV Season 3 Box	Released: March 3, 2013; Label: YGEX; Format: DVD
New Evolution Global Tour in Japan	Released: March 13, 2013; Label: YGEX; Format: DVD, Blu-ray
2014 World Tour All or Nothing in Japan	Released: December 10, 2014; Label: YGEX; Format: DVD, Blu-ray

== Music videos ==
List of music videos and directors
Title	Year	Director(s)	Ref.
"Lollipop" (with BigBang)	2009	Seo Hyun-seung	
"Fire" (Space ver.)	2009	Seo Hyun-seung	
"Fire" (Street ver.)	2009	Seo Hyun-seung	
"I Don't Care"	2009	Cha Eun-taek	
"Try to Follow Me"	2010	Seo Hyun-seung	
"Clap Your Hands"	2010	Seo Hyun-seung	
"Go Away"	2010	Cha Eun-taek	
"Can't Nobody"	2010	Seo Hyun-seung	
"It Hurts (Slow)"	2010	Kim Hye-jeong	
"Don't Stop the Music"	2010	Unknown	
"Lonely"	2011	Han Sa-min	
"I Am the Best"	2011	Seo Hyun-seung	
"Hate You"	2011	Mari Kim	
"Ugly"	2011	Han Sa-min	
"Lonely" (Japanese ver.)	2011	Han Sa-min	
"Go Away" (Japanese ver.)	2011	Cha Eun-taek	
"Scream" (Japanese ver.)	2012	Unknown	
"Be Mine" (Intel Project)	2012	Unknown	
"I Love You"	2012	Seo Hyun-seung	
"Falling In Love"	2013	Han Sa-min	
"Do You Love Me"	2013	Seo Hyun-seung	
"Missing You"	2013	Han Sa-min	
"Come Back Home"	2014	Dee Shin	
"Happy"	2014	Han Sa-min	
"Gotta Be You"	2014	Han Sa-min	
"Crush" (Japanese ver.)	2014	Seo Hyun-seung	
"Goodbye"	2017	DQM	
