= Welcome Back Tour =

2024–2025 concert tour by 2NE1

- Tour by 2NE1
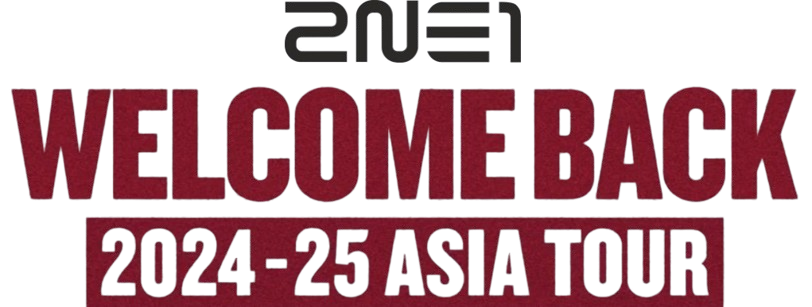
- Welcome Back Tour logo
- Location: Asia
- Start date: October 4, 2024
- End date: April 13, 2025
- No. of shows: 27
- Attendance: 258,000 (25 shows)
- Box office: $44 million
- Website: yg-2ne1.com/welcomeback

2NE1 concert chronology
- All or Nothing World Tour (2014); Welcome Back Tour (2024–2025)

The Welcome Back Tour was the fourth concert tour by South Korean girl group 2NE1. Held in commemoration of the group's 15th anniversary, it is the quartet's first headlining concert tour since the All or Nothing World Tour (2014). Spanning twenty-seven shows across Asia, the Welcome Back Tour commenced at the Olympic Hall in Seoul on October 4, 2024, and concluded at the KSPO Dome on April 13, 2025.

== Background ==
On July 22, 2024, YG Entertainment officially announced the reunion of 2NE1 for their 15th debut anniversary, after having been disbanded for eight years since November 2016. It was announced that the group would embark on a world tour beginning in South Korea in October 2024, with shows slated to be scheduled in other regions within 2025, in response to the requests received from across the globe.

Three days later, it was unveiled that the tour would kick off at the Olympic Hall in Seoul, the venue which 2NE1 performed at for their first concert tour Nolza in August 2011. Fans expressed discontent regarding the venue's capacity after the announcements were made; in response, YG Entertainment issued a statement explaining that all larger venues in Seoul had "already been booked". It was announced the following day that 2NE1's Japanese fanclub, Blackjack Nolza, would be re-opened in early August.

On September 6, 2024, concert dates in Manila and Jakarta were announced, followed by Hong Kong and Singapore four days later, and Bangkok and Taipei on September 13. Dates in Kuala Lumpur, Ho Chi Minh City, and Macao were announced on November 6. On January 6, 2025, encore concerts in Seoul at the KSPO Dome were announced for April 12 and 13, 2025.

== Production ==
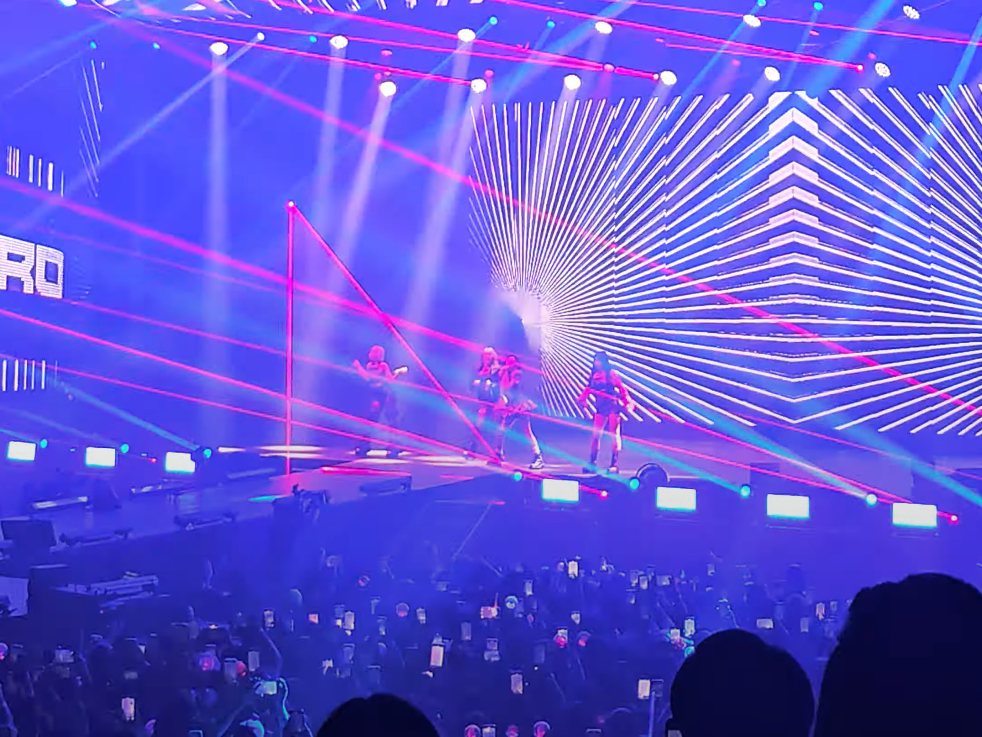
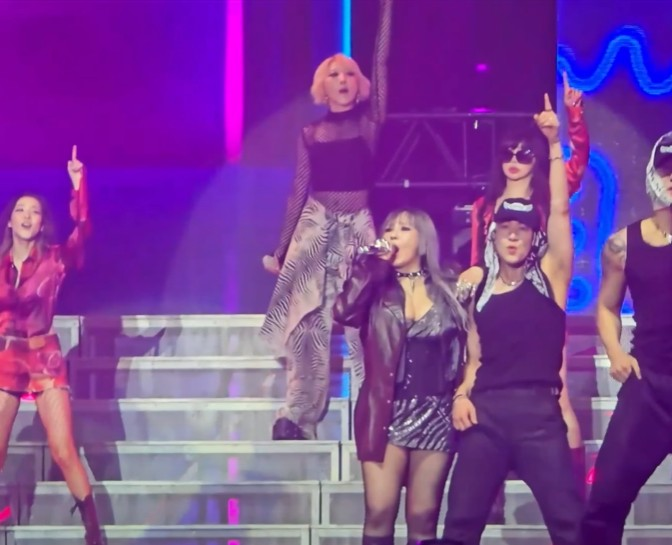
2NE1 performing "Can't Nobody" in Manila (top), and "Go Away" in Singapore (bottom)

2NE1 aimed to capture the essence of their classic sound during the Welcome Back Tour by performing their songs in their original form. The group's leader, CL, expressed that this was in contrast to their previous tours, where they often presented rearranged versions of their songs or featured reworked choreography. Furthermore, the quartet actively crafted the concert's experience through their involvement in all of its aspects during its preparation, spanning from the setlist, stage design, choreography, and costumes, amidst others.

== Commercial performance ==
Demand for the Seoul concerts resulted in over 400,000 people vying for tickets accommodating 3,000 to 4,000 seats at the venue, thereby crashing the server. An additional concert was added for October 4, alongside the release of additional restricted-view seats for all three dates. All four initial shows in Japan were sold out within a day, therefore two additional shows were added. The shows in Jakarta and Singapore were sold out instantly after tickets went on sale, with over 200,000 users queuing for the latter concert. An additional show was added in both cities.

Over 350,000 users were recorded in the virtual queue for the Manila concerts, with both dates selling out immediately. On October 11, YG announced that all shows in Tokyo and Kobe were sold out. In Taiwan, all 18,000 tickets were sold out in 90 seconds after the general sale release. In Macao, over 300,000 users were recorded in the virtual queue, and all tickets were sold out.

The concerts in Seoul were attended by numerous K-pop artists, actors, and entertainers. The shows in 2024 attracted around 170,000 people from 16 shows. In total, the tour grossed an estimated US$44 million.

== Critical reception ==
The tour received mostly positive reviews from music critics. Beginning in Seoul, Yoon Seo-yeon writing for Korea JoongAng Daily called the concert as a "true definition of what K-pop is and what it should be". Pyo Kyung-min writing for The Korea Times cited the show reaffirmed the quartet's "legendary status in the music scene". Hong Yoo writing for The Korea Herald wrote their choreography was vigorous and demanded much more energy than the routines of some of today's K-pop girl groups.

In Manila, Russell Ku writing for Rappler described how stunned he was at how an arena could be packed from front to back with fans, young and old, and felt the show was different from the other concerts he had gone to after witnessing the crowd already jumping, resulting in the arena to feel as though it were "shaking". Allan Policarpio writing for Philippine Daily Inquirer narrated them as a group who "never looks too calculated or preoccupied with what they have to do next", elaborating how their "instincts guide the way they work their numbers, and make sure to always leave room for spontaneous interactions with each other, or with the crowd". In Singapore, Ang Benson from The Straits Times remarked that although a decade has passed since 2NE1 last performed, "their infectious energy and their fans' fiery passion have not abated". Belinda Poh of HallyuSG praised the group's vocals, charisma, and stage presence, and likened the show to a "love letter to their fans".

== Ticketing issues ==
The tour's "overwhelming demand" resulted in tickets quickly resurfacing on third‑party websites at "exorbitant prices". In the Philippines, former senator Kiko Pangilinan called for political action and the introduction of a legislation as a result of widespread scalping for the tour's tickets in Manila. The Anti-Ticket Scalping Act was filed in the Filipino senate in December 2024, aiming to regulate the purchase of tickets to "protect consumers from exploitation and guarantee fair access to events".

In Singapore, ticket sales for the quartet and Hong Kong singer Andy Lau's concerts, sufficed a loss of $66,000 within a period of two weeks due to scams over fake concert tickets. It resulted in a minimum of 92 reported police cases where the victims completed transactions through third party platforms in early October. The police advised the public to utilize the "Scam Shield" app, and to purchase tickets from authorized sellers and legitimate ticket marketplaces.

== Set list ==
This set list represents the show on October 6, 2024, in Seoul, South Korea. Variations to the setlist over the course of the concert run are noted below.

Main set

1. "Intro" (contains elements of "Come Back Home")
2. "Fire"
3. "Clap Your Hands"
4. "Can't Nobody"
5. "Do You Love Me"
6. "Falling in Love"
7. "I Don't Care"
8. "The Baddest Female" (CL solo, shortened with extended intro)
9. "MTBD" (CL solo, shortened)
10. "Missing You"
11. "It Hurts (Slow)"
12. "If I Were You"
13. "Lonely"
14. "I Love You"
15. "Ugly"
16. "Gotta Be You"
17. "Come Back Home"
18. "I Am the Best"
19. "Go Away"

Encore

20. "Happy"
21. "In the Club"
22. "Crush" / "I Don't Care" (reprise) / "Ugly" (reprise) / "Go Away" (reprise) / "Can't Nobody" (reprise)

Double encore (Note: The double encore was performed during the October 6 show in Seoul only.)

23. "Let's Go Party"
24. "Stay Together"
25. "I Am the Best"

Alterations

- In Manila, "In the Club" was replaced by "In or Out" (group version).
- In Jakarta, "Happy" and "In the Club" were replaced by "Follow Me" and "Baby I Miss You".
- In Kobe & Hong Kong, the same two songs were replaced by "Don't Stop the Music" and "Good to You".
- In Tokyo, the same two songs were replaced by "Scream" and "Don't Stop the Music". Additionally, the Japanese versions of "It Hurts (Slow)", "I Am the Best", "Go Away," "Scream", and "Don't Stop the Music" were performed.
- In Singapore, "Happy" was replaced by "All I Want for Christmas Is You".
- In Bangkok, "Happy" and "In the Club" were replaced by "Please Don't Go" and "Stay Together".
- In Kuala Lumpur, "In the Club" was replaced by "Hate You".
- In Taipei, "Happy" and "In the Club" were replaced by "Let's Go Party" and "Pretty Boy".
- In Ho Chi Minh City, the same two songs were replaced by "Kiss" (Dara solo) and "You and I" (Bom solo) (Day 1) / “Pretty Boy” (Day 2).
- In Macau, "Happy" was replaced by "Pretty Boy" .

== Tour dates ==
Key
†	Indicates performances streamed simultaneously in cinemas

List of concert dates
Date	City	Country	Venue	Attendance	Revenue
October 4, 2024	Seoul	South Korea	Olympic Hall	12,000 / 12,000	—
October 5, 2024	Seoul	South Korea	Olympic Hall	12,000 / 12,000	—
October 6, 2024	Seoul	South Korea	Olympic Hall	12,000 / 12,000	—
November 16, 2024	Manila	Philippines	SM Mall of Asia Arena	140,000 / 140,000	—
November 17, 2024	Manila	Philippines	SM Mall of Asia Arena	140,000 / 140,000	—
November 22, 2024	Jakarta	Indonesia	Beach City International Stadium	140,000 / 140,000	—
November 23, 2024	Jakarta	Indonesia	Beach City International Stadium	140,000 / 140,000	—
November 29, 2024	Kobe	Japan	World Memorial Hall	140,000 / 140,000	—
November 30, 2024	Kobe	Japan	World Memorial Hall	140,000 / 140,000	—
December 1, 2024	Kobe	Japan	World Memorial Hall	140,000 / 140,000	—
December 8, 2024	Hong Kong		AsiaWorld–Arena	140,000 / 140,000	—
December 13, 2024	Tokyo	Japan	Ariake Arena	140,000 / 140,000	—
December 14, 2024	Tokyo	Japan	Ariake Arena	140,000 / 140,000	—
December 15, 2024 †	Tokyo	Japan	Ariake Arena	140,000 / 140,000	—
December 21, 2024	Singapore		Singapore Indoor Stadium	17,000 / 17,000	—
December 22, 2024	Singapore		Singapore Indoor Stadium	17,000 / 17,000	—
January 25, 2025	Pak Kret (Note: Billed as Bangkok)	Thailand	Impact Exhibition Hall 5–6	—	—
January 26, 2025	Pak Kret	Thailand	Impact Exhibition Hall 5–6	—	—
February 1, 2025	Kuala Lumpur	Malaysia	National Hockey Stadium	13,000 / 13,000	$2,650,000
February 8, 2025	Taoyuan (Note: Billed as Taipei)	Taiwan	NTSU Arena	20,000 / 20,000	$2,805,000
February 9, 2025	Taoyuan	Taiwan	NTSU Arena	20,000 / 20,000	$2,805,000
February 15, 2025	Ho Chi Minh City	Vietnam	Saigon Exhibition and Convention Center	16,000 / 16,000	—
February 16, 2025	Ho Chi Minh City	Vietnam	Saigon Exhibition and Convention Center	16,000 / 16,000	—
February 22, 2025	Macau		Venetian Arena	18,000 / 18,000	—
February 23, 2025	Macau		Venetian Arena	18,000 / 18,000	—
April 12, 2025	Seoul (Note: Labelled as Encore)	South Korea	KSPO Dome	22,000 / 22,000	—
April 13, 2025	Seoul	South Korea	KSPO Dome	22,000 / 22,000	—
Total				258,000	$44,000,000
