= New Evolution Global Tour =

2012 concert tour by 2NE1

- Tour by 2NE1
- South Korean promotional handbill
- Location: Asia; North America
- Associated album: Various
- Start date: July 28, 2012
- End date: December 1, 2012
- No. of shows: 15
- Attendance: 180,000

2NE1 concert chronology
- Nolza Tour (2011); New Evolution Global Tour (2012); All or Nothing World Tour (2014)

New Evolution Global Tour was the second concert tour by South Korean girl group 2NE1. It saw shows in 15 shows across 7 countries in Asia and North America spanning from July to December 2012. The tour marked the first world tour by a Korean girl group, while its show at the Prudential Center in Newark marked the first time a Korean artist held a solo arena concert in the United States.

The tour received critical acclaim from music critics, who praised the production, the group's energy, and performance. It attracted approximately 180,000 attendees in total. YG Entertainment released a live album DVD of the Seoul concerts in December 2012, followed by a Japanese version of the Yokohama concerts in March 2013.

== Background ==
The New Evolution Global Tour was officially announced on June 13, 2012 through the YG Family website. Marking the first world tour by a Korean girl group, the announcement revealed that the group would hold concerts throughout Asia, North America and Europe.

The tour kicked off at the Olympics Gymnastics Stadium in Seoul on July 28 and 29, following the group's "I Love You" promotions. The tour was originally set to conclude on December 8 in Kuala Lumpur, however the concert was cancelled due to unresolved technical issues and ended instead on December 1 at the Singapore Indoor Stadium.

== Production ==
Three-time winner of the MTV Video Music Award for Best Choreography, Travis Payne, served as the main director for production and choreography, along with Divinity Roxx (who previously worked on Beyonce's world tour) and Michael Cotten (who worked on production design for the Olympic Games). Beatrice Chia-Richmond served as the creative director and concert organizer.

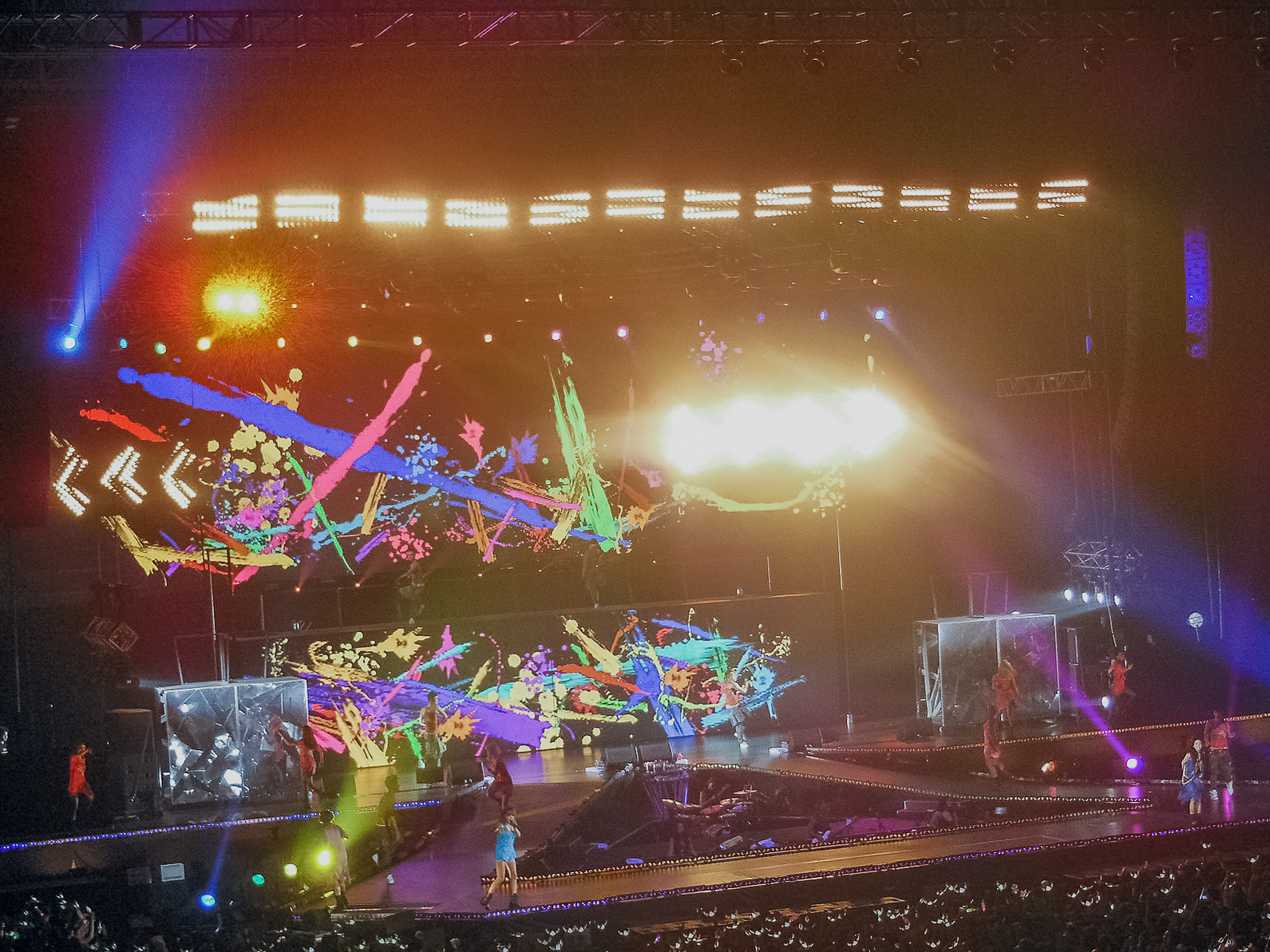
2NE1 performing in Singapore

The stages were transformed into a theme park, a club, a sporting arena, and a fantasy world which incorporated use of giant inflatable props, conveyor belts, and a video wall—where it simulated a rollercoaster ride during CL and Minzy's performance of "Please Don't Go". The tour costumes were designed by long-time fashion collaborator Jeremy Scott.

== Critical reception ==
The tour received critical acclaim from music critics. Jon Caramanica of The New York Times ranked the concert at the Prudential Center in New Jersey number two in their list of the best concerts of the year, deeming 2012 "the year K-pop arrived" in the form of arena shows into the United States. Reviewing the same concert, Jeff Benjamin of Billboard remarked that "This important show is the latest in a series of happenings that have allowed 2NE1 to emerge as one of the leaders (if not the leader) of the K-pop movement in America."

Writing for The Korea Times, Kwaak Je-yup praised the group's vocals, energy, and choreography, and commented that the production of the concert was "consistently excellent". SSTV stated that tour were some of the best concerts among any girl group, while Newsis commented the tour was reminiscent of a summer rock festival and "the performance was more complete than anything else". My Daily wrote that the tour "raised the quality of domestic concerts to a new level".

== Commercial performance ==
2NE1 became the first K-pop group to be listed on the Billboard Boxscore list, placing at number 29 with their Los Angeles concert with a total of $653,716 in revenue. In Taipei, the show grossed NT$28.9 million ($1 million) in revenue.

== Set list ==
This set list was taken from the shows in Seoul on July 28 and 29, 2012. It does not represent all shows throughout the tour.

Act 1

1. "I Am the Best"
2. "Fire"
3. "Clap Your Hands"
4. "I Don't Care" (Reggae mix version)
5. "Don't Stop the Music"

Act 2

6. Club DJ (CL solo)
7. "Don't Cry" and "You and I" (Bom solo)
8. "Try to Follow Me"
9. "Please Don't Go" (CL and Minzy duet)
10. "Pretty Boy"
11. "Kiss" (Dara solo)

Act 3

12. "It Hurts (Slow)"
13. "Lonely"

Act 4

14. "In the Club"
15. "Stay Together"
16. "I Love You"

Act 5

17. "Ugly"
18. "Let's Go Party"
19. "Scream"
20. "Hate You"
21. "Go Away"
22. "Can't Nobody"

Encore

23. "I Don't Care"
24. "I Am the Best" (Remix)

== Shows ==
List of tour dates
Date	City	Country	Venue	Attendance	Revenue
July 28, 2012	Seoul	South Korea	Olympic Gymnastics Arena	20,000	—
July 29, 2012	Seoul	South Korea	Olympic Gymnastics Arena	20,000	—
August 17, 2012	Newark	United States	Prudential Center	10,000	—
August 24, 2012	Los Angeles	United States	Nokia Theatre L.A. Live	6,680	$653,716
August 31, 2012	Osaka	Japan	Osaka-jō Hall	120,000	—
September 1, 2012	Osaka	Japan	Osaka-jō Hall	120,000	—
September 2, 2012	Osaka	Japan	Osaka-jō Hall	120,000	—
September 7, 2012	Nagoya	Japan	Nippon Gaishi Hall	120,000	—
September 8, 2012	Nagoya	Japan	Nippon Gaishi Hall	120,000	—
September 11, 2012	Yokohama	Japan	Yokohama Arena	120,000	—
September 12, 2012	Yokohama	Japan	Yokohama Arena	120,000	—
September 29, 2012	Saitama	Japan	Saitama Super Arena	120,000	—
September 30, 2012	Saitama	Japan	Saitama Super Arena	120,000	—
November 16, 2012	Taipei	Taiwan	Taipei Arena	10,000	$1,011,500
December 1, 2012	Singapore		Singapore Indoor Stadium	8,200	—
Total				180,000	N/A

=== Cancelled shows ===
Date	City	Country	Venue	Reason
November 24, 2012	Jakarta	Indonesia	Mata Elang International Stadium	Unresolved technical issues
December 8, 2012	Kuala Lumpur	Malaysia	Malawati Stadium	Unresolved technical issues

== Personnel ==
- Artist: CL, Minzy, Dara, Bom
- Tour organizer: YG Entertainment, Running Into The Sun (Singapore)
- Music director/bassist: Divinity Roxx
- Keyboardist: DANiiVORY
- Engineer: Eric Racy
- Drummer: Gabriel "Manuals" Wallace
- Guitarist: Sharon Aguilar
- Creative director: Beatrice Chia Richmond
- Production: Travis Payne, Divinity Roxx, Michael Cotten
- Tour guest performers : Will.i.am (Los Angeles only)

== Broadcast and recordings ==
2012 2NE1 Global Tour: New Evolution (Live in Seoul)

Live album by 2NE1
- Released: December 4, 2012
- Recorded: July 2012
- Length: 58:52
- Label: YG
- Producer: Teddy Park, e.knock

2NE1 chronology
Collection (2012)	2012 2NE1 Global Tour: New Evolution (Live in Seoul) (2012)	Crush (2014)

2012 2NE1 Global Tour: New Evolution (Live in Seoul) is the second live album of South Korean girl group 2NE1. The album was released on December 4, 2012, by YG Entertainment. The live album sold 10,613 copies in South Korea, while in Japan, it sold 6,000 copies.

The album was recorded during the group's first world tour New Evolution during their Seoul dates on July 28 and 29 at the Olympic Gymnastics Arena.

=== Track listing ===
No.	Title	Length
1.	"I Am the Best (Live)" (내가 제일 잘 나가)	3:32
2.	"Fire (Live)"	3:43
3.	"Clap Your Hands (Live)" (박수쳐)	4:08
4.	" I Don't Care (Reggae Remix) [Live]"	3:57
5.	"Don't Stop the Music (Live)"	4:15
6.	" It Hurts (Slow) [Live]" (아파 (Slow))	4:55
7.	"Lonely (Live)"	4:16
8.	"In the Club (Live)"	5:01
9.	"Stay Together (Live)"	3:33
10.	"I Love You (Live)"	6:01
11.	"Ugly (Live)"	3:30
12.	"Hate You (Live)"	3:19
13.	"Go Away (Live)"	3:52
14.	"Can't Nobody (Live)"	4:50
Total length:		54:53
