= Collection (2NE1 album) =

- Limited edition cover

Compilation album by 2NE1
- Released: March 28, 2012
- Recorded: 2010–2012
- Genre: J-pop; EDM
- Length: 41:51
- Label: YGEX; Avex Trax

2NE1 chronology
1st Live Concert (Nolza!) (2011)	Collection (2012)	Global Tour New Evolution In Seoul (2012)

Singles from Collection
- 1. "Go Away" Released: November 16, 2011; 2. "Scream" Released: March 28, 2012

Professional ratings
Review scores
Source	Rating
Rolling Stone Japan	3.5/5 stars

Collection is a Japanese compilation album by South Korean girl group 2NE1. It was released on March 28, 2012, in four different editions: CD+2DVD+Photobook, CD+DVD, CD+Goods (HMV stores only) and a Regular edition (CD Only). The album contains three new tracks: "Scream", "She's So (Outta Control)" (Taku Remix) and a cover of Madonna's "Like a Virgin".

== Release ==
The album was released in four different editions:

CD+2DVD+Photobook edition includes with the album, two DVDs (disc one with Japanese music videos and disc two with a selection of Korean music videos), 24-pages album photobook and a 34-pages special photobook. CD+DVD includes the album, a DVD with Japanese music videos and a 24-pages photobook. CD+Goods includes the album, a face towel and a Logo take out Bag; this version is limited and will be sold only on HMV. The Regular edition includes the CD and the 24-page photobook only.

== Singles ==
The album produced two singles. The first is a Japanese version of the song "Go Away". It was released on November 15, 2011, as the group's debut single in Japan. The physical single ranked number 12 in Oricon's Weekly chart.

The song "Scream" served as the album's lead single and was the first original Japanese-language single of the group. It released on the same day as the album, on March 28, 2012, in three different editions. The single contains the song "Scream" and the B-side "Fire", which is a Japanese remake of the group's debut song in South Korea, and is also included in the album. The single debuted at number 7 on the Oricon Daily Singles Chart. The song is the first original Japanese song of the group.

== Track listing ==
No.	Title	Lyrics	Music	Length
1.	"Fire"	Teddy, Sunny Boy	Teddy	3:45
2.	"Scream"	Teddy, Verbal (m-flo)	Teddy, Dee.P	3:42
3.	"Go Away"	Teddy, Shoko Fujibayashi, Sunny Boy	Teddy	3:39
4.	"Follow Me"	Teddy, Kenn Kato	Teddy	3:08
5.	"I Don't Care"	Teddy, E.Knock, Rina Moon, Sunny Boy	Teddy, E.Knock	4:00
6.	"I Am the Best"	Teddy, 17J	Teddy	3:31
7.	"It Hurts"	E.Knock, Tatsuji Ueda	E.Knock, Sunwoo Jeong A	4:16
8.	"Clap Your Hands"	E.Knock, Sunny Boy	E.Knock	3:42
9.	"Love is Ouch"	Masta Wu, Ritsuko Tanifuji, Sunny Boy	Choice37, Big Tone	3:53
10.	"Ugly"	Teddy, Kenn Kato	Teddy, Lydia Paek	4:09
11.	"Like a Virgin" (Madonna cover) (Bonus track))	Tom Kelly, Billy Steinberg		4:14
Total length:				41:51

Physical album bonus track
No.	Title	Lyrics	Music	Length
11.	"She's So (Outta Control)" (Taku Remix)	m-flo & Minami	m-flo & Minami	3:45
Total length:				46:57

DVD-1 (Japanese Music videos)
No.	Title	Length
1.	"Scream"
2.	"I Am the Best"
3.	"Ugly"
4.	"Hate You"
5.	"Lonely"
6.	"Go Away"

DVD-2 (Korean Music videos)
No.	Title	Length
1.	"Fire" (Space version)
2.	"Fire" (Street version)
3.	"I Don't Care"
4.	"Follow Me"
5.	"Clap Your Hands"
6.	"It Hurts"
7.	"Can't Nobody" (English version)

- Tracks 1–10 are in Japanese. "Like a Virgin" is performed in the original English. "She's So (Outta Control)" is originally a song of the Japanese hip hop duo m-flo, from the album Square One.

== Charts ==
Chart (2012)	Peak position
Japanese Albums (Oricon)	5
Japanese Top Albums (Billboard)	5

== Sales ==
Sales for Collection
Region	Certification	Certified units/sales
Japan	—	42,269

== Release history ==
Country	Date	Format	Label
Japan	March 28, 2012	Digital download; CD	YGEX; Avex Trax
