= List of 2NE1 live performances =

2NE1 concert tours
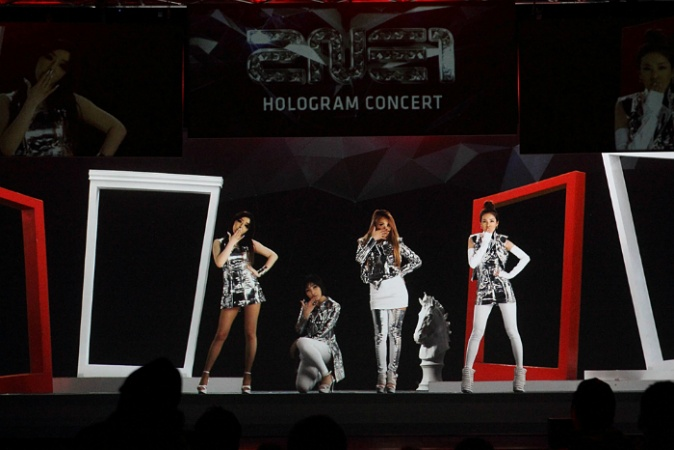
- 2NE1 performing in 2013
- Concert tours: 4
- One-off concerts: 3
- Fanclub events: 2
- Affiliated tours: 2

South Korean girl group 2NE1 has embarked on four headlining concert tours, one of which is a worldwide tour. Their first concert appearance was at the "YG Family Concert" held in December 2010 in Seoul. The group's first headlining tour was the Nolza Tour, which was held in support of their second Korean EP and their first Japanese EP, respectively. The tour attracted 70,000 people in Japan alone.

The group then embarked on their first worldwide concert tour, the New Evolution Global Tour. The tour's first stop was made in Seoul on July 28, 2012, and made its first international stop in the United States at the Prudential Center in Newark on August 17, which was followed by one more date at the Nokia Theater in Los Angeles on August 24, 2012. The Nokia Theater stop made the group the first Korean girl group to rank on the Billboard Current Boxscore, where they ranked number 29 with an almost sold out concert. The New Evolution tour expanded to the rest of Asia later that year, starting with Japan and concluding in Singapore at Singapore Indoor Stadium.

In 2014, 2NE1 embarked on their second worldwide concert tour, the All or Nothing World Tour, in support of their second studio album, Crush. The tour began in Seoul and concluded in Macau for a total of 20 shows. In 2024, 2NE1 embarked on their reunion tour after ten years titled the Welcome Back Tour, which spanned 27 performances across Asia. Tickets sold out quickly in nearly every city, leading to additional shows being added.

== Concert tours ==
| Year | Title | Duration | Shows | Attendance |
|---|---|---|---|---|
| 2011 | Nolza Tour | August 26, 2011 – October 2, 2011 (Asia) | 9 | 82,000 |
2NE1's debut concert tour, the Nolza! tour, supported their second extended play, 2NE1 2nd Mini Album, and its Japanese version, Nolza. Demand for concert tickets was huge in both countries it was held in; in South Korea, the first two concerts that were scheduled for the Olympic Hall were sold out instantly after opening. 60,000 people were recorded applying for only 8,000 available seats, therefore a third concert was added for August 26. 300,000 applications for concert tickets were recorded for the Japanese leg of the tour, and all 70,000 available tickets were sold within a day. Big Bang's G-Dragon, T.O.P., and Taeyang joined as guest performers on the tour. It was attended by 82,000 people in total.
| 2012 | New Evolution Global Tour | July 28, 2012 – December 1, 2012 (Asia, North America) | 15 | 180,000 |
The New Evolution Global Tour was the first world tour by a K-pop girl group, and its concert at the Prudential Center in New Jersey marked the first time a K-pop girl group held an arena concert in the United States. 15 shows were held across five countries in Asia and North America, with the first two concerts in Seoul in late July attracting 20,000 people. After performing in the U.S., the group held their second arena tour in Japan, where it was attended by about 120,000 people across nine concerts. After the tour's conclusion, New York Times critics ranked the New Jersey show as the second best concert of the year. In total, the tour attracted around 180,000 people.
| 2014 | All or Nothing World Tour | March 1, 2014 – October 17, 2014 (Asia) | 20 | — |
2NE1's third concert tour, titled All or Nothing (AON), was held in support of the group's second Korean-language studio album Crush. It stopped in multiple cities in Asia including South Korea, Japan, Philippines, China, Thailand, Indonesia, and others from March to October 2014. Prior to their debut, YG label-mate Winner performed as special guests during the tour during the concerts held in March to May.
| 2024–2025 | Welcome Back Tour | October 4, 2024 – April 13, 2025 (Asia) | 27 | 258,000 (Note: From 24 out of 27 shows) |
In July 2024, YG Entertainment announced that 2NE1 would be embarking on a concert tour commemorating their 15th anniversary, beginning in Seoul in October, Osaka in late November, and then Tokyo in December. Shows in the Philippines, Indonesia, Hong Kong, Singapore, Thailand, and Taiwan were announced in September. Additional dates were added in nearly all cities due to overwhelming demand. Shows in Malaysia, Vietnam, and Macau were announced in November. In January, an encore performance in Seoul at the KSPO Dome was also announced.

== One-off concerts ==
| Event name | Date | City | Country | Venue | Special guests | Attendance | Ref. |
|---|---|---|---|---|---|---|---|
| The Party: 2NE1 Live in Manila | June 4, 2011 | Manila | Philippines | Araneta Coliseum | The Bloomfields; Callalily; Techy Romantics; Philippine All Stars; Christian Bautista | — | |
| Going Together Concert in Vietnam with 2NE1 | November 19, 2011 | Hanoi | Vietnam | National Convention Center | Phương Vy; Thanh Duy | 3,500 | |
| 2NE1 Super Live 2013 in Universal Studios Japan | May 11, 2013 | Osaka | Japan | Gramercy Park, Universal Studios Japan | — | 6,000 | |
| Ganzberg Super Idol – I Am the Best (Note: Part of the Ganzberg Super Idol concert series) | July 5, 2025 | Phnom Penh | Cambodia | Koh Pich | — | 10,000 | |
| Kpop Masterz Presents 2NE1 & Ten Special Live in Japan 2026 | December 8–9, 2026 | Tokyo | Japan | LaLa Arena Tokyo Bay | | | |

== Fan meetings ==
| Event name | Date | City | Country | Venue | Ref. |
|---|---|---|---|---|---|
| 2NE1 Exclusive Fan Meeting Presented by Yamaha | April 6, 2011 | Bangkok | Thailand | Thunder Dome | |
| 2NE1 1st Fanclub Event 2013 ～Do You Love Me～ | October 12, 2013 | Tokyo | Japan | Tokyo Dome City Hall | |
| 2NE1 1st Fanclub Event 2013 ～Do You Love Me～ | October 14, 2013 | Osaka | Japan | Namba Hatch | |
| 2NE1 Fanclub Event 2014 | December 12, 2014 | Tokyo | Japan | Zepp Tokyo | |
| 2NE1 Fanclub Event 2014 | December 13, 2014 | Osaka | Japan | Dojima River Forum | |
| 2NE1 Fanclub Event 2014 | December 14, 2014 | Osaka | Japan | Dojima River Forum | |
| 2NE1 Fanclub Event 2014 | December 19, 2014 | Fukuoka | Japan | Skala Espacio | |
| 2NE1 Fanclub Event 2014 | December 20, 2014 | Nagoya | Japan | Zepp Nagoya | |

== Award shows ==
List of 2NE1 award shows performances
| Event | Date | Location | Performed song(s) |
|---|---|---|---|
| 34th & 35th Cyworld Digital Music Awards | June 10, 2009 | Seoul | "Fire" |
| 36th & 37th Cyworld Digital Music Awards | August 20, 2009 | Seoul | "I Don't Care" |
| 2009 Mnet 20's Choice Awards | August 28, 2009 | Seoul | "I Don't Care"; "Fire" |
| 2009 Style Icon Awards | November 11, 2009 | Seoul | "Fire" |
| 2009 Mnet Asian Music Awards | November 21, 2009 | Seoul | "Kiss"; "You and I"; "Please Don't Go"; "I Don't Care" |
| 2009 Melon Music Awards | December 16, 2009 | Seoul | "Let’s Go Party"; "Fire"; "I Don’t Care" |
| 2009 Cyworld Digital Music Awards | March 1, 2010 | Seoul | "Fire"; "I Don't Care" |
| 2010 MTV World Stage VMAJ | May 29, 2010 | Tokyo | "Fire" |
| 2010 Style Icon Awards | November 17, 2010 | Seoul | "Can't Nobody" |
| 2010 Mnet Asian Music Awards | November 28, 2010 | Macau | "Clap Your Hands"; "Follow Me"; "Can't Nobody" |
| 2010 Melon Music Awards | December 15, 2010 | Seoul | "Can't Nobody"; "Go Away" |
| 2011 Mnet Asian Music Awards | November 29, 2011 | Singapore | "Lonely"; "I Am the Best" |
| 2012 MTV Video Music Awards Japan | June 23, 2012 | Chiba | "Scream"; "I Am the Best" |
| 2012 Melon Music Awards | December 14, 2012 | Seoul | "I Love You" |
| 22nd Seoul Music Awards | January 31, 2013 | Seoul | "I Love You" |
| 2013 Mnet 20's Choice Awards | July 18, 2013 | Seoul | "Falling in Love" |
| 2013 Mnet Asian Music Awards | November 22, 2013 | Hong Kong | "Lonely"; "Missing You" |
| 28th Golden Disc Awards | January 16, 2014 | Seoul | "Do You Love Me" |
| 3rd Gaon Chart Music Awards | February 12, 2014 | Seoul | "Missing You" |
| 2015 Mnet Asian Music Awards | December 2, 2015 | Hong Kong | "Fire"; "I Am the Best" |

== Music festivals ==
List of 2NE1 music festival performances
| Event | Date | Location | Performed song(s) |
|---|---|---|---|
| 2009 Asia Song Festival | September 19, 2009 | Seoul | "Fire"; "I Don't Care" |
| 11th Korea-China Song Festival | October 6, 2009 | Qingdao | |
| 2009 SBS Gayo Daejeon | December 29, 2009 | Seoul | "Fire"; "You and I" (Note: Performed by Park Bom and Taeyang); "The Leaders" (Note: Performed by CL and G-Dragon); "Let's Go Party" (Note: Featuring G-Dragon and Taeyang) |
| 2009 KBS Song Festival | December 31, 2009 | Seoul | "Love is So Difficult" (Note: Lee Seung-chul cover); "I Don’t Care"; "Don't Say Goodbye"; "Fire" |
| Hallyu Dream Festival | September 19, 2010 | Gyeongju | "Go Away" |
| Seoul Tokyo Music Festival | November 3, 2010 | Saitama | "Can't Nobody"; "Go Away" |
| 12th Korea-China Song Festival | December 2, 2010 | Seoul | "Go Away" |
| 2010 SBS Gayo Daejeon | December 29, 2010 | Seoul | "Go Away"; "It Hurts" (Note: Featuring Kim Gun-mo); "Can't Help Falling in Love" (Note: Elvis Presley cover, performed with Kim Gun-mo); "Excuse" (Note: Kim Gun-mo cover, featuring himself) |
| 2010 MBC Gayo Daejejeon | December 31, 2010 | Seoul | "Can't Nobody"; "Go Away"; "Oh Yeah" |
| MTV Daum Music Fest | February 19, 2011 | Seoul | "Can't Nobody"; "Go Away" |
| Korean Music Wave in Singapore | July 15, 2011 | Singapore | "Fire"; "Lonely"; "I Am the Best"; "Can't Nobody"; "I Don't Care" |
| MBC Summer Festival 2011 | July 26, 2011 | Ulsan | "Lonely"; "I Am the Best" |
| Incheon Korean Music Wave | August 13, 2011 | Incheon | "Ugly"; "I Am the Best" |
| Seoul Tokyo Music Festival | December 25, 2011 | Saitama | "I Am the Best"; "Ugly" |
| 2011 SBS Gayo Daejeon | December 29, 2011 | Seoul | "I Am the Best"; "Ugly" |
| 2012 K-pop Collection in Okinawa | October 18, 2012 | Naha | "I Am the Best"; "I Love You" |
| 2012 SBS Gayo Daejeon | December 29, 2012 | Seoul | "I Love You" |
| 2012 MBC Gayo Daejejoon | December 31, 2012 | Seoul | "I Love You" (Note: With Lee Hi); "1, 2, 3, 4" (Note: Lee Hi cover) |
| Korean Music Wave in Bangkok | March 16, 2013 | Bangkok | "I Love You"; "Fire"; "I Am the Best" |
| MBC Summer Festival 2013 | July 27, 2013 | Ilsan | "Falling in Love" |
| 2013 SBS Gayo Daejeon | December 29, 2013 | Seoul | "Missing You"; "Do You Love Me" |
| 2014 SBS Gayo Daejeon | December 21, 2014 | Seoul | "Crush"; "Come Back Home" |
| Coachella 2022 | April 16, 2022 | Indio, California | "I Am the Best" |
| 2024 SBS Gayo Daejeon | December 25, 2024 | Incheon | "Fire"; "I Don't Care"; "Ugly"; "I Am the Best" |
| 2025 Head in the Clouds Festival | June 1, 2025 | Pasadena | "Fire"; "Clap Your Hands"; "Can't Nobody"; "Falling in Love"; "I Don't Care"; "The Baddest Female" (CL solo); "MTBD" (CL solo); "Lonely"; "Ugly"; "Gotta Be You"; "I Am the Best"; "Go Away" |
| Waterbomb Seoul | July 6, 2025 | Seoul | "Fire"; "Clap Your Hands"; "Can't Nobody"; "Falling in Love"; "I Don't Care"; "Ugly"; "Gotta Be You"; "I Am the Best"; "Go Away" |
| UTO Fest | July 19, 2025 | Bangkok | "Fire"; "Clap Your Hands"; "Can't Nobody"; "Falling in Love"; "I Don't Care"; "Ugly"; "Gotta Be You"; "I Am the Best"; "Go Away" |
| Waterbomb Busan | July 26, 2025 | Busan | "Fire"; "Clap Your Hands"; "Can't Nobody"; "Falling in Love"; "I Don't Care"; "Ugly"; "Gotta Be You"; "I Am the Best"; "Go Away" |
| Kpop Masterz in Taiwan | August 10, 2025 | Taichung | "Fire"; "Clap Your Hands"; "Can't Nobody"; "Falling in Love"; "I Don't Care"; "Ugly"; "Gotta Be You"; "I Am the Best"; "Go Away" |
| Waterbomb Singapore | August 31, 2025 | Singapore | "Fire"; "Clap Your Hands"; "Can't Nobody"; "Falling in Love"; "I Don't Care"; "Ugly"; "Gotta Be You"; "I Am the Best"; "Go Away" |
| Waterbomb Bali | September 6, 2025 | Bali | "Fire"; "Clap Your Hands"; "Can't Nobody"; "Falling in Love"; "I Don't Care"; "Ugly"; "Gotta Be You"; "I Am the Best"; "Go Away" |
| Waterbomb Macao | November 8, 2025 | Macao | "Fire"; "Clap Your Hands"; "Can't Nobody"; "Falling in Love"; "I Don't Care"; "Ugly"; "Gotta Be You"; "I Am the Best"; "Go Away" |

== Affiliated tours ==
=== 2010 YG Family Concert ===
| Date | City | Country | Venue | Attendance |
|---|---|---|---|---|
| December 4, 2010 | Seoul | South Korea | Olympic Gymnastics Arena | 36,000 |
| December 5, 2010 (2 shows) | Seoul | South Korea | Olympic Gymnastics Arena | 36,000 |

=== YG Family 15th Anniversary Concert (2011–2012) ===
Setlist in South Korea
1. 2NE1 – Fire
2. 2NE1 – Can't Nobody
3. 2NE1 – Go Away
4. Big Bang – Tonight (Remix)
5. Big Bang – Hands Up
6. Big Bang – Cafe
7. Big Bang – Love Song (Acoustic)
8. Gummy – I'm Fallin'
9. GUMMY – I'm Sorry Remix
10. Seven – Better Together
11. Seven featuring Top – Digital Bounce
12. Seven – Angel
13. Seven – Passion
14. Jinusean and Seven – Passion
15. GD, Seven and Jinusean – Hip Hop Gentlemen
16. Jinusean – A-YO
17. Jinusean – Phone Number
18. Jinusean featuring Dara – Tell Me
19. Tablo featuring Bom – Bad
20. Tablo featuring Gummy – Airbag
21. Tablo featuring Taeyang – Tomorrow
22. Seven and Daesung – It Hurts
23. Seven, Daesung, Taeyang and Seungri – Lonely (Acoustic)
24. GD and Top featuring CL and Minzy – Oh Yeah
25. GD and Top – High High
26. Psy – Right Now
27. Psy – Celebrity
28. Psy – Shake It
29. Psy – It's Beautiful
30. Psy – Paradise
31. Psy – Champion
32. Seungri – Se7en's Come To Me
33. Seven – Come Back To Me
34. Seven – I'll Do Well
35. Seven – La La La (Remix)
36. 2NE1 – I Am The Best
37. 2NE1 – Clap Your Hands
38. 2NE1 featuring Gummy – Ugly
39. Gummy
40. Gummy featuring G-Dragon – Heartbreaker (Acoustic)
41. Big Bang – Haruharu (Acoustic)
42. Big Bang – Lies
43. Big Bang – Heaven

Encore:

1. 2NE1 and Gummy – Last Farewell
2. G-Dragon, Top, Seungri and Daesung – I Am the Best
3. YG Family – Champion

| Date | City | Country | Venue | Attendance |
|---|---|---|---|---|
| December 3, 2011 | Seoul | South Korea | Olympic Gymnastics Arena | 39,000 |
| December 4, 2011 (2 shows) | Seoul | South Korea | Olympic Gymnastics Arena | 39,000 |
| January 7, 2012 | Osaka | Japan | Kyocera Dome | 160,000 |
| January 8, 2012 | Osaka | Japan | Kyocera Dome | 160,000 |
| January 21, 2012 (2 shows) | Saitama | Japan | Saitama Super Arena | 160,000 |
| Total | | | | 200,000 |
