= 2NE1 (disambiguation) =

2NE1 is a South Korean girl group.

2NE1 may also refer to:

- 2NE1 (2009 EP), by the South Korean girl group
- 2NE1 (2011 EP), by the South Korean girl group
- 2NE1 (drug) or APICA, a synthetic cannabinoid drug
