= Can't Nobody (2NE1 song) =

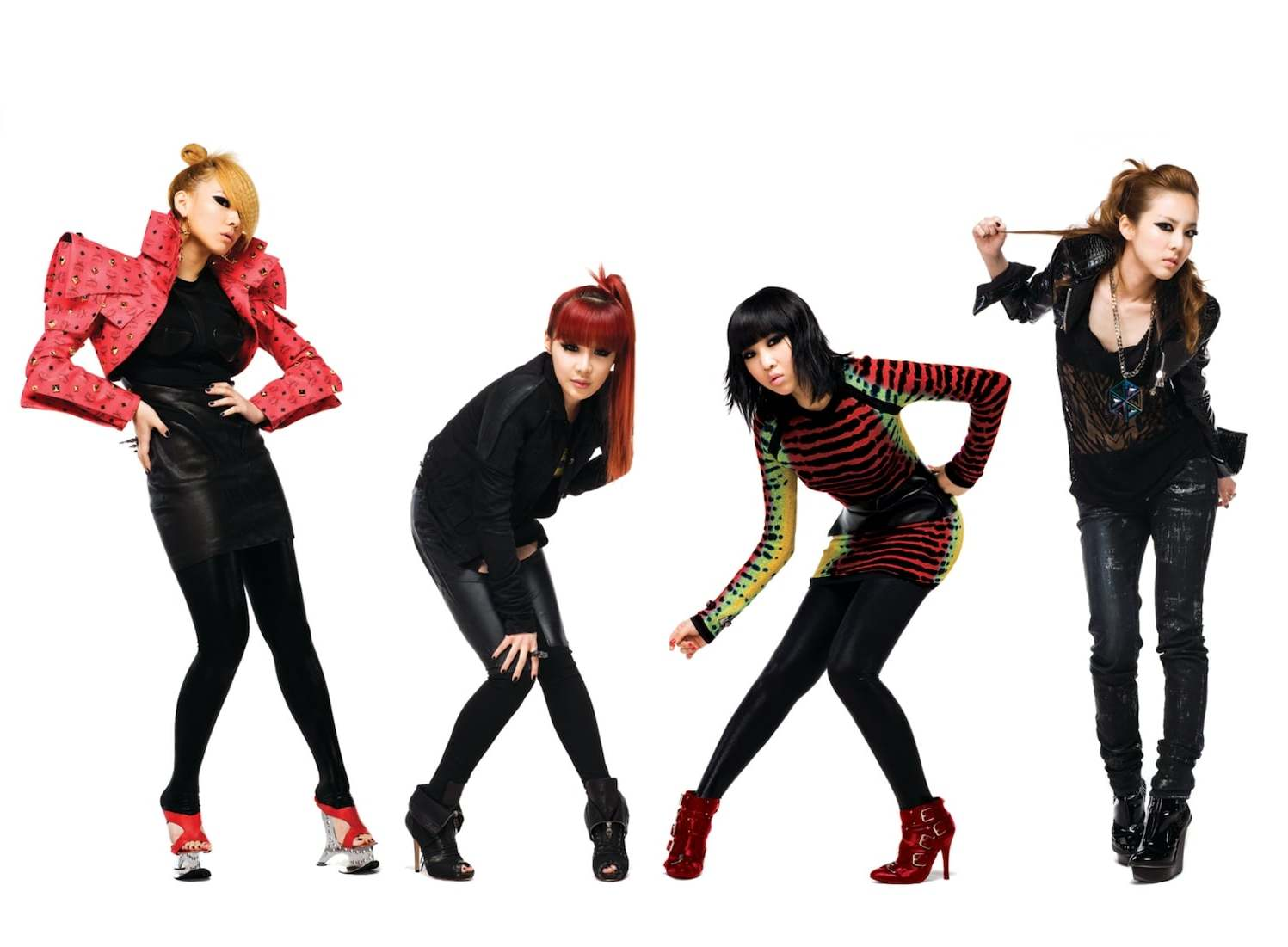
- English version cover

Single by 2NE1

from the album To Anyone
- Language: Korean; English
- Released: September 9, 2010
- Recorded: 2010
- Genre: Dance-pop; electropop
- Length: 3:24
- Label: YG
- Songwriter: Teddy Park
- Producer: Teddy Park

2NE1 singles chronology
"Go Away" (2010)	"Can't Nobody" (2010)	"It Hurts (Slow)" (2010)

Music video
- "Can't Nobody" on YouTube

"Can't Nobody" is a song recorded by South Korean girl group 2NE1. It was released as one of the three title tracks from the group's debut studio album To Anyone on September 9, 2010, by YG Entertainment. The song was written and produced by Teddy Park and is musically a dance-pop number with the lyrics revolving around the themes of self-confidence and empowerment. Commercially, it peaked at number 2 on both the weekly and monthly Gaon Digital Charts and sold more than 2.3 million digital units by the end of the year.

== Background ==
The song was written and produced by Teddy Park, who has worked on 2NE1's previous extended play in 2009 and their single "Try to Follow Me" in February 2010. It was promoted as part of the triple “title tracks”, or lead promotional singles for the album To Anyone, along with "Clap Your Hands" and "Go Away". The music video for "Can't Nobody" was released on September 12, and the first live stage for the song was broadcast later that night on Inkigayo. The song would go on to win seven first place awards on several music programs, including their first two "Triple Crowns" on Inkigayo and M! Countdown. The song was promoted alongside "Go Away" and would last for a month and half before ceasing for "It Hurts (Slow)".

The English version of "Can't Nobody" was released on Recochoku, a popular Japanese ringtones website, on January 19, 2011. It also coincided with the release of the music video for the English version. On February 23, 2010, it was announced that it would be packaged with the Japanese version of "Go Away" as 2NE1's debut single in Japan.

== Reception ==
Lee Jong-min of IZM gave "Can't Nobody" an unfavorable review, where he felt that the "unity of the arrangement was a bit unnatural" and more effort was put into trying to make it a hit than originality. Lee remarked that even though it was popular upon release, he was "already worried about rapid aging." Following the album's release, the song debuted at number four on the Gaon Digital Chart and was the highest-charting song out of all the album's tracks. The following week, "Can't Nobody" rose two positions and peaked at number 2, just below the album's other title track "Go Away". By the end of 2010, the song was downloaded over 2,300,000 times, making it the 13th best-selling single of the year in South Korea.

== Music video ==
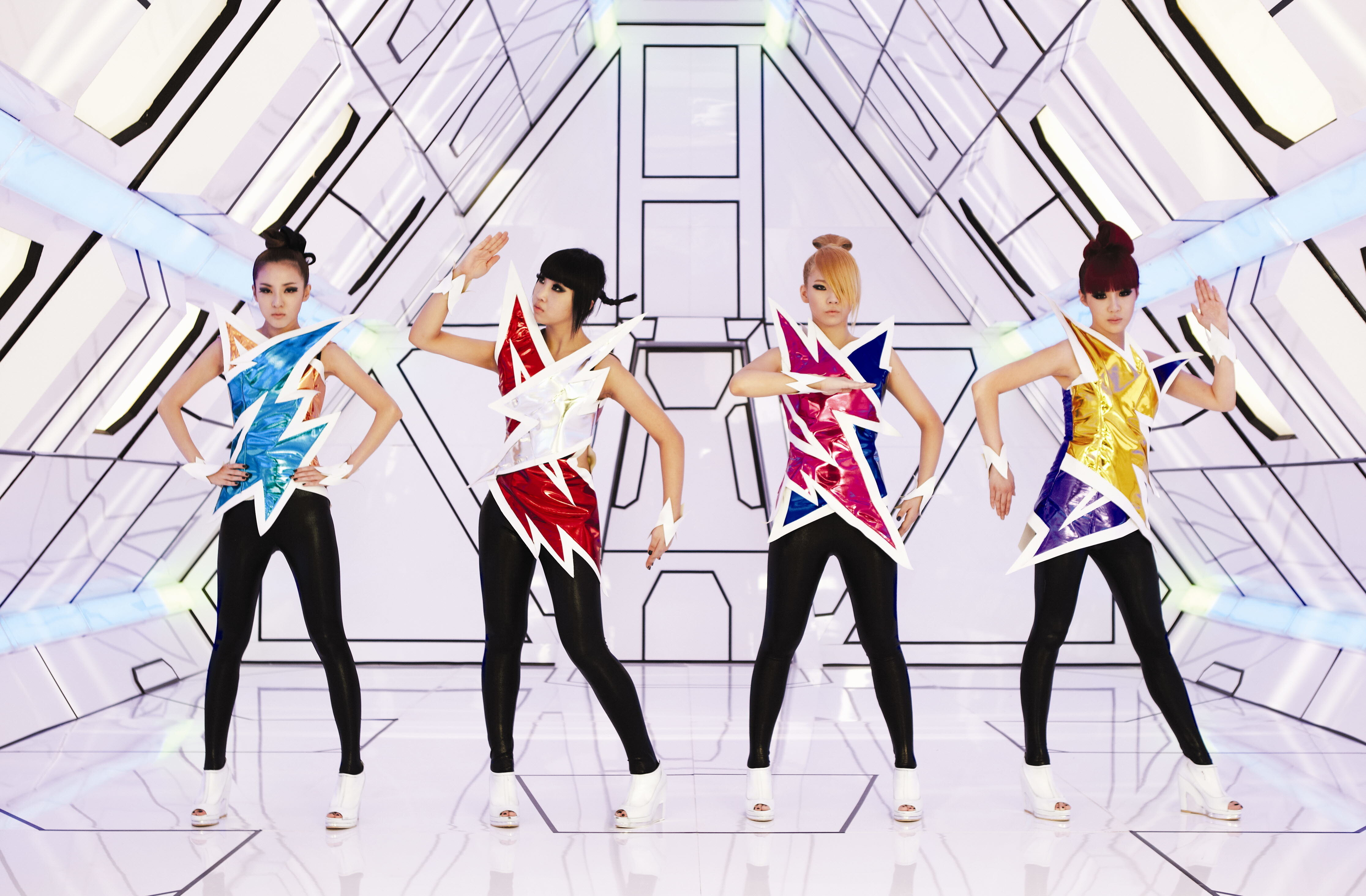
A promotional shoot for the music video, showing the group sporting colorful and futuristic outfits inside a spacecraft.

=== Background ===
The music video was filmed in August 2010. Two different versions of the video were filmed: a Korean version and an English version—and were both directed by Seo Hyun-seung, who has also directed 2NE1's previous videos such as "Fire" and "Try to Follow Me". Filming for the music video lasted about 4 days for both the Korean and English versions. The original Korean video was uploaded to 2NE1's official YouTube channel on September 12, 2010, while the English version was uploaded on April 7, 2011.

=== Synopsis ===
The Korean music video begins with CL singing the intro under a curtain as she pulls the zipper down to reveal her nose and mouth. The scene changes with her wearing black attire, rising up in an elevator. As her verse begins, she is seen driving a black Lamborghini around the city of Seoul. As her verse continues, the video shows CL coming out of a pink van with "2NE1" labeled on the side. She continues to sing as Minzy, Dara and Bom are dancing behind her wearing pink space-like suits. In Minzy's verse, she dances provocatively along an isolated corridor. For the chorus, the scene shows all the members dancing as Bom and Dara sing the main vocals. In the second verse, the girls are wearing masks that resemble 1TYM's Teddy Park, Yang Hyun-suk and G-Dragon. The next scene shows CL in a room with large stereo/robotic-type machines in the background as she performs in a yellow chair. In Minzy's verse, the scene moves back and forth from her wearing a studded hoodie and tattoos on her torso while sitting on a boombox, and her in a business suit standing next to a large black dog. The next scene shows Bom wearing a black karate suit sitting in a meditation room with her eyes closed, and another scene that shows her performing in front of lights. In Dara's scene, she's seen wearing a long and elegant gown as wind blows through the fabrics of the dress. Afterwards, the girls are all seen in a spaceship as it begins to malfunction. The space craft overturns, and the girls then go down a slide. The last scene shows the girls dancing and having fun in a large white room with flashing lights. The video concludes with Dara head-butting the camera and the girls looking through it.

== Accolades ==
Awards and nominations
Year	Organization	Award	Result	Ref.
2010	Bugs Music Awards	Music Video of the Year	Nominated	
2010	Korean Music Awards	Best Dance & Electronic Song	Nominated	
2010	Mnet Asian Music Awards	Best Music Video	Won	
2010	Mnet Asian Music Awards	Song of the Year	Nominated	
2010	Mnet Asian Music Awards	Best Female Dance Performance	Nominated	

Music program wins
Program	Date	Ref.
Music Bank	September 17, 2010	
Inkigayo	September 19, 2010	
Inkigayo	September 26, 2010	
Inkigayo	October 3, 2010	
M Countdown	September 23, 2010	
M Countdown	September 30, 2010	
M Countdown	October 7, 2010	

== Credits and personnel ==
- 2NE1 – primary vocals
- Songwriter – Teddy Park
- Composer – Teddy
- Arranger – Teddy

== Charts ==
=== Weekly charts ===
Chart (2010)	Peak position
South Korea (Gaon)	2
US World Digital Songs (Billboard)	2

=== Monthly charts ===
Chart (2010)	Peak position
South Korea (Gaon)	2

=== Yearly charts ===
Chart (2010)	Position
South Korea (Gaon)	13

== Sales ==
Country	Sales amount
South Korea (digital)	2,550,000
South Korea (ringtone)	105,000

== Release history ==
Country	Release date	Format	Distributor
Worldwide	September 9, 2010	Digital download	YG Entertainment
Japan	January 19, 2011	Ringtone (English version)	Avex Group
Japan	February 2, 2011	iTunes digital download (English version)	Avex Group
