= To Anyone =

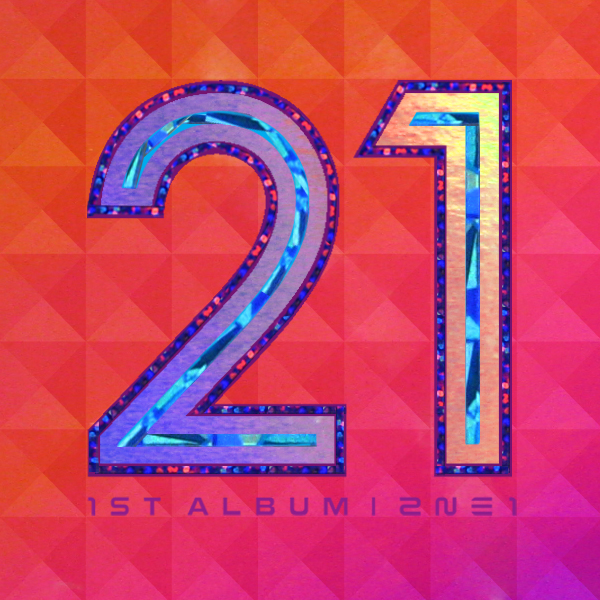

Studio album by 2NE1
- Released: September 9, 2010
- Recorded: 2009–2010
- Genres: Dance-pop; electropop; hip hop
- Length: 43:45
- Labels: YG; CJ E&M
- Producers: Teddy Park; e.knock; PK; Big Tone; Sunwoo; Jungah; Choice37

2NE1 chronology
2NE1 (2009)	To Anyone (2010)	2NE1 (2011)

Singles from To Anyone
- 1. "Clap Your Hands" Released: September 8, 2010; 2. "Go Away" Released: September 9, 2010; 3. "Can't Nobody" Released: September 11, 2010; 4. "It Hurts (Slow)" Released: October 31, 2010

To Anyone is the first studio album by South Korean girl group 2NE1, released under YG Entertainment on September 9, 2010. 2NE1 began recording the material for To Anyone in 2009 following the release of their debut EP, and worked alongside Teddy Park, e.knock, Choice37, and Big Tone to produce the album. Musically, it is a pop record that integrates various genres including R&B, dance, and hip hop.

Upon its release, To Anyone received mixed reviews from music critics. While praise mainly centred on its production quality, critics were ambivalent toward the overuse of auto-tune software. It saw commercial success in South Korea, debuting at number one on the Gaon Album Chart and was the number one album on Gaon's monthly chart. In total, the album has sold over 168,000 copies in the country. To Anyone went on to win Album of the Year at the 2010 Mnet Asian Music Awards and Melon Music Awards.

Several singles were spawned and promoted from To Anyone, including the "triple title tracks" "Go Away", "Can't Nobody" and "Clap Your Hands". All three singles were released in conjunction with the album and peaked within the top three positions on the Gaon Digital Chart. The final single "It Hurts", was released on October 31. The members solo singles from the previous year were also included in the album's track list.

== Development and background ==
In August 2010, YG Entertainment CEO Yang Hyun-suk announced that 2NE1 will promote three title tracks for their first full-length album. Each promotional single would have a music video to accompany it. They were later announced as "Clap Your Hands", "Go Away", and "Can't Nobody". "Clap Your Hands" was written and composed by producer e.knock, whereas "Go Away" and "Can't Nobody" were created by Teddy Park. Two days before the release of the album, the pre-orders for the album had reached 120,000 copies. By the end of September, the album had sold 100,000 copies. On October 28, it was announced that the group would be re-releasing the album in Japan on December 8, 2010, under Japanese record label Avex. The release of To Anyone in Japan would mark the group's debut there. However it was later announced that the album's release was delayed as both YG Entertainment and Avex wanted to develop the album further. The album was also announced to be sold in Thailand on October 28. YG Entertainment also announced a partnership with Universal Records to release the album in the Philippines.

== Music and lyrics ==
To Anyone is classified largely as a pop record, but contains strong elements of dance and R&B. Lyrically, the album is about female independence. The main single "Go Away" is about telling a man to "go away" during a break-up.

== Promotion ==
Music videos for "Clap Your Hands" and "Go Away" were released on September 9 and 10, respectively. "It Hurts (Slow)" was promoted after the initial three songs, with its music video releasing on November 1.

The first stage performances for the album were on SBS's September 12 episode of Inkigayo. They performed their three title tracks, "Clap Your Hands," "Go Away," and "Can't Nobody". The performances were recorded early in the day so they could perform at the Hallyu Dream Concert in Gyeongju later in the evening. They won first place on Mnet M! Countdown for "Clap Your Hands" on the day of their performances, followed by first-place win the next day on KBS' Music Bank for "Can't Nobody", and a first-place win the following week on SBS' The Music Trend for "Can't Nobody". Overall, 2NE1 had gained first place eleven times on the various music shows.

After the group finished performing the three main singles of the album, YG Entertainment announced that 2NE1 would be resuming promotions with the album performing "It Hurts (Slow)" on music programs. The group began their first promotions with the song on SBS's Inkigayo during Halloween, October 31, 2010. The music video for the song was released on November 1, 2010, to accompany with the group's follow-up promotions.

== Songs ==
"I Don't Care (Reggae Mix Ver." (2009)
"I Don't Care" was released as an official single through a reggae mix, later included on the album To Anyone.

2NE1's 2009 hit "I Don't Care" was remixed and retitled "I Don't Care (Reggae Mix Ver.)" and was the album's first track to be released. It was first performed on the September 1, 2009, showing of The Music Trend. It was released on September 3, and peaked at number twenty six on the monthly BGM Chart. "Kiss" was a solo song for Dara featuring CL, and served as the next single. It was released on September 7, and peaked at number five. "Kiss" was followed by Bom's solo song "You and I", released on October 28, 2009. The song reached number one for November. "Please Don't Go", a duet between leader CL and youngest member Minzy, was the last single of 2009 released for the album. The song, released November 20, peaked at number six. "Try to Follow Me" was a surprise release by the group on February 9, 2010. It peaked at number one on February 13, 2010.

The group went under the radar until September 9, when they released their album along with the triple promotional singles. "Clap Your Hands" peaked at number three in South Korea and was the first track to have a music video, which was released the same day. The song was praised for having top production quality and being aggressive. "Go Away" and "Can't Nobody" were the other two of the simultaneous track releases. They were both praised and had received positive responses overall. However, all three songs were criticized for use of auto-tune. "Go Away" peaked at number one in South Korea, while "Can't Nobody" and "Clap Your Hands" topped at the second and third positions. "It Hurts (Slow)" was the last promoted single from the album, and peaked at number four upon album's release. It was praised as one of the highlights of the album that focused on the group's vocal talents.

"Can't Nobody (Eng Ver)" was released as a ringtone in Japan to start their initial debut there but was delayed until November, due to the March earthquake. "Go Away" was selected to be the first official single, with a release on March 9, 2011.

== Critical reception ==
To Anyone received mixed reviews from music critics. KBS World praised the album, stating the album showed that YG Entertainment was still "one of the top companies [...] in music production quality". They also stated that the album showed off a more "grown-up image" and that songs like "It Hurts (Slow)" showed off the vocal talent they possess. In a mixed review, Han Dong-yun from webzine IZM said that the album triggers feelings of excitement, fun, and adrenaline; however he noted the rather excessive autotune and felt that it created a distraction. Han additionally commented that while the album is "full of energy", it is "difficult to find elements that stimulate the emotions". In February 2011, To Anyone was selected as the Best Dance & Electronic Album at the 8th Korean Music Awards; selection committee member Kim Yun-ha said that 2NE1 stands out with their "unique charms", despite the "music created by several young composers under Teddy's direction not being perfect", and called the album proof of the group's "overflowing vitality". Since its initial release, the album has been regarded as the work that introduced the group to a larger audience outside the K-pop realm. In 2015, Bugs! included To Anyone in their list of the 19 Best Girl Group Albums since 1995.

== Commercial performance ==
Commercially, To Anyone debuted at number one on September 11, 2010. Additionally, the album charted at number one for the month of September to November. In the United States, the album peaked at number seven on the Billboard World Albums chart. In total, the album sold 122,845 copies by the end of 2010. "Go Away", on its own, sold 2,444,933 digital downloads, and "Can't Nobody" had similar numbers at 2,327,146 downloads. "Clap Your Hands" was downloaded 1,841,485 times, and "It Hurts (Slow)" sold 1,703,377 copies. "Try to Follow Me" was the last song from the album to be downloaded over a million times, enjoying an early February release on its own as a digital single, at 1,770,787 downloads. "Love Is Ouch" and "I'm Busy", neither promoted or released as a single, were downloaded 903,293 and 902,101 times, respectively.

== Track listing ==
All lyrics are written by Teddy, except where noted; all music is composed by Teddy, except where noted.

To Anyone track listing
No.	Title	Lyrics	Music	Arrangement	Length
1.	"Can't Nobody"			Teddy	3:28
2.	"Go Away"			Teddy	3:39
3.	"Clap Your Hands" (박수쳐; Baksu Chyeo)	e.knock	e.knock		3:42
4.	"I'm Busy" (난 바빠; Nan Bappa)	Big Tone	PK, Big Tone	PK	3:38
5.	"It Hurts (Slow)" (아파; Apa)	e.knock, Sunwoo Jungah	e.knock, Sunwoo Jungah	Sunwoo Jungah	4:16
6.	"Love Is Ouch" (사랑은 아야야; Salangeun Ayaya)	Masta Wu	Choice37, Big Tone	Choice37	3:53
7.	"You and I" (Bom solo)			Teddy	3:54
8.	"Please Don't Go" (CL and Minzy)			Teddy	3:18
9.	"Kiss" (Dara solo featuring CL)			Teddy	3:33
10.	"Try to Follow Me" (날 따라 해봐요; Nal Ddara Haebwayo)			Teddy	3:09
11.	"I Don't Care" (Reggae Remix)	Teddy, e.knock	Teddy, e.knock	Sunwoo Jungah	3:52
12.	"Can't Nobody" (English Version)			Teddy	3:28
Total length:					43:50

== Personnel ==
- Choi Pil-gang – recording director
- Tom Coyne – mastering
- Gong "Minzy" Min-ji^{[b]} – co-producer
- Jang Seong-eun – art director, artwork and design
- Kim "e.knock" Byunghoon – co-producer, recording director
- Kim Eseuteo – overseas business
- Lee "CL" Chae-rin^{[b]} – co-producer
- Lee "Big Tone" Dae-seong – recording director
- Lee Gyeong-jun – producing engineer, recording engineer
- Lee Hyeong-ju – artwork and design
- Lee Jeong-un – photographer
- Park Bom^{[b]} – co-producer
- Park "Teddy" Hong-jun – producer, recording director
- Park "Dara" Sandara^{[b]} – co-producer
- Jason Robert – mixing engineer
- Shin Seong-gwon – recording engineer
- Sunwoo Jungah – recording director
- Yang Hyuk Suk – executive producer, producer
- Yang Min-seok – executive supervisor

== Accolades ==
Awards and nominations for To Anyone
Year	Ceremony	Award	Result	Ref.
2010	Dosirak Music Awards	Album of the Year	Won	
2010	Golden Disc Awards	Album Bonsang	Nominated	
2010	Melon Music Awards	Album of the Year	Won	
2010	Mnet Asian Music Awards	Album of the Year	Won	
2011	Korean Music Awards	Best Dance & Electronic Album	Won	

== Charts ==
=== Weekly charts ===
Chart (2010)	Peak position
South Korean Albums (Gaon)	1
Japanese Albums (Oricon)	27
US World Albums (Billboard)	7

=== Monthly charts ===
Chart (2010)	Peak position
South Korean Albums (Gaon)	1

=== Yearly charts ===
Chart (2010)	Position
South Korean Albums (Gaon)	7

Chart (2011)	Position
South Korean Albums (Gaon)	49

== Release history ==
Release history and formats for To Anyone
Country	Date	Format	Label
South Korea	September 9, 2010	CD	YG Entertainment; CJ E&M
Various	September 9, 2010	Digital download; streaming	YG Entertainment; CJ E&M
Thailand	October 28, 2010	CD+DVD	GMM Grammy
Philippines	January 15, 2011	CD+DVD	Universal Records
