= Please Don't Go (2NE1 song) =

Single by CL and Minzy

from the album To Anyone
- Released: November 20, 2009
- Recorded: 2009
- Genre: K-pop; dance; hip-hop
- Length: 3:18
- Label: YG
- Songwriter: Teddy Park
- Producer: Teddy Park

CL singles chronology
"Kiss" (2009)	"Please Don't Go" (2009)	"The Baddest Female" (2013)

"Please Don't Go" is a song recorded by the South Korean girl group 2NE1, performed as a duet by CL and Minzy. It was released as a digital single through YG Entertainment on November 20, 2009, although no accompanying music video was released to promote it. It was later included on 2NE1's debut studio album To Anyone in September 2010.

== Background and release ==
"Please Don't Go" was announced as a surprise single one day before its release on November 19, 2009. A source from YG Entertainment said that the single was a project that they were secretly working on for 2NE1's new album, which was originally intended to be released that month. However, the album release was postponed and no music video was produced in order to not let the staff around them know.

== Commercial performance ==
Upon its release on November 20, "Please Don't Go" overtook "You and I" by fellow 2NE1 member Park Bom for the number one spot on real-time charts in South Korea. On the Melon weekly chart, the song peaked at number 2 during the week of November 22–28, 2009, with 2PM's "Heartbeat" occupying number one. The song entered at number 30 on the inaugural chart issue of the newly established Gaon Digital Chart for the week of December 27, 2009 – January 2, 2010. It placed at number 82 on the monthly Gaon Digital Chart issue for January 2010, falling from number 7 from the previous month.

== Live performances ==
The duo first performed the song live at the 2009 Mnet Asian Music Awards on November 21 as part of 2NE1's set, and was followed up with a performance at the SBS Love Sharing Concert on November 22. That same day, the duo began promoting the song on the music program Inkigayo, which they appeared on for several weeks.

== Chart performance ==
=== Weekly charts ===
Chart (2010)	Peak position
South Korea (Gaon)	30

=== Monthly charts ===
Chart (2009)	Position
South Korea (Gaon)	7

== Release history ==
Country	Date	Format	Label
South Korea	November 20, 2009	Digital download, streaming	YG Entertainment
