= Go Away (2NE1 song) =

- Japanese CD+DVD Type A cover

Single by 2NE1

from the album To Anyone and Collection
- Language: Korean
- Released: September 9, 2010
- Recorded: 2010
- Genre: Dance-pop; electropop
- Length: 3:36
- Label: YG; Avex
- Songwriter: Teddy Park
- Producer: Teddy Park

2NE1 singles chronology
"Clap Your Hands" (2010)	"Go Away" (2010)	"Can't Nobody" (2010)

2NE1 Japanese singles chronology
"Go Away" (2011)	"Scream" (2012)

"Go Away" (Korean: 고어웨이) is a song by South Korean girl group 2NE1 from their first studio album To Anyone (2010). The original Korean version was released as the lead single from the album on September 9, 2010. It was produced and written by Teddy Park, with additional Japanese lyrics written by Shoko Fujibayashi. The song was released in Japan on November 16, 2011, as the group's debut single for their first Japanese studio album Collection (2012).

The song was a commercial success in South Korea, achieving the number one spot on both the weekly and monthly Gaon Digital Charts. It was ranked the fourth best-performing single overall in the country in 2010. It received more than 500,000 ringtone downloads by the end of the year and over 2,900,000 digital downloads by 2013. In Japan, the song peaked at number 12 on the Oricon Singles Chart and sold more than 21,000 physical copies.

Two music videos were produced in Korean and Japanese. 2NE1 performed on four music programs in South Korea to promote "Go Away", including Inkigayo and M Countdown. It won the Song of the Month award at the Cyworld Digital Music Awards and Favorite K-pop Video at the 2011 Myx Music Awards.

== Background and promotion ==
"Go Away" (Korean version)
A 21-second sample of "Go Away", which is described as a dance-rock song infused with techno and electropop.

The song was produced by Teddy Park, who served as the lead producer for 2NE1's previous extended play 2NE1. Musically, the song is composed in the key of B major with a tempo of 128 beats per minute, and has a runtime of 3:36. "Go Away" was promoted as part of the triple "title tracks" series for To Anyone, alongside "Clap Your Hands" and "Can't Nobody". Prior to the album's release, teasers for the song were released on YG Life leading up to the album's release. The album, along with the single "Go Away" and its Korean music video was released simultaneously on September 9, 2010. The single was promoted on several music programs until the promotions for the album's next single, "It Hurts (Slow)".

The song was the second 2NE1 song to be released as a ringtone in Japan, after "Can't Nobody (English Version)," in March 2011. A Japanese version of the song was first announced in late March, after it was announced as the theme song for the Fuji TV early morning news program Mezanyū. It was used as the theme song between April 1 and October 1, 2011.

The Japanese version of "Go Away" was announced in September 2011 as the group's debut physical single in Japan, after the group's three digital singles and extended play Nolza released earlier in the year. The single was released by YGEX on November 16, 2011, along with the Japanese-language version of the group's song "It Hurts" as the single's B-side.

== Music video ==
=== Background ===
The Korean music video for the song is six minutes long and was directed by Cha Eun-taek. It was filmed in August 2010 and was released on September 9, 2010. The video won "Favorite K-pop Video" at the Myx Music Awards 2011. A Japanese version of the music video was released by YGEX along with the single. The short version of the Japanese music video was uploaded to the group's official YouTube channel on November 17, 2011.

=== Synopsis ===
The Korean music video opens with CL in a cafe with her boyfriend (Song Jae-rim). CL's boyfriend is stressed out about dating her still and calls off the relationship, telling her not to mess with him anymore or else he'd kill her before getting up. CL wants him to stay and grabs his hand, but he lets go and leaves. A distressed CL puts her glasses on, bumps into a girl, then accidentally bangs into a door. Minzy is waiting for her outside in her car, then CL drives off. It begins to rain and CL throws a relationship ring out of the car. In the chorus, CL is at the racetrack getting ready to race and sees her ex-boyfriend who is also wearing a race uniform with a new girl. The two race against each other but her ex-boyfriend wins, because she hesitated when he almost crashed into her. Intercut in the race are scenes of Dara and Bom. The next chorus shows Dara drinking with a devastated CL with Minzy outside the cafe standing in rain with an umbrella. Flashbacks of CL and her ex-boyfriend in happier times are shown in between. Next all of the members are playing in a band in a garage with Bom playing the keyboard, Minzy on the drums, CL on the microphone, and Dara on the guitar.

The next scene shows a drunk CL going to the house of her ex-boyfriend. CL knocks on the door and her ex-boyfriend tries to ignore her while his new girl is involved. CL gets angry and kicks the door. Her ex-boyfriend opens the door and drags her away. CL states about the jacket she gave to him to where her ex slaps her and starts shouting at her that she needs to stop messing with him. He throws the jacket onto the ground and leaves as CL got a bruise on her cheek. The other members come and help her get up. In the third chorus, CL has come to the racetrack again with an obvious bruise on her cheek she got from the fight and races against her ex-boyfriend once more. At the last minute of the race, with tears on her face, CL bumps her ex-boyfriend's car and they both push against each other. CL's black car flies into the air then bumps into her ex-boyfriend's car again. The cars explode and start a fire. In the last scene, CL is re-covered and standing with the other members, dressed in black, looking at the car. They all turn and comfort CL, smiling as they walk away.

== Reception ==
As with the rest of the To Anyone album, the overall response was favorable. "Go Away" topped various online charts along with the other two title tracks. On the official South Korean singles chart, it debuted at number eight on September 11, 2010. By the eighteenth, it had reached number one where it stayed in the top position for two weeks. It was replaced by "It's You" by Sung Si-kyung featuring IU. On the monthly chart, it captured the number one spot for the month of September, where it was then replaced by "Then Then Then" by Supreme Team featuring Youngjun. At the end of the year, the song placed fourth overall for all songs released in South Korea. It achieved 2,444,933 downloads and 24,516,687 streams, enabling it to place 16th and 14th on the downloads and streaming chart, respectively.

"Go Away" was named the third most downloaded ringtone in South Korea in 2010, and the first by a female artist, with over 547,000 ringtone downloads. As of 2013, the song garnered over 2,900,000 units in digital sales in the country (excluding ringtones). In Japan, it has sold more than 21,150 physical copies since release in 2011.

== Live performances ==
The song was performed as one of three promotional singles through the month of September along with "Clap Your Hands" and "Can't Nobody". It was performed on the four main music programs in South Korea: M! Countdown, Music Bank, Inkigayo, and Show! Music Core. The group began Japanese promotions for their debut single by performing the song at Happy Music on November 21, 2011. In the United States, it was performed as the closing number for their set at the 2025 Head in the Clouds Festival in Pasadena, California.

== Accolades ==
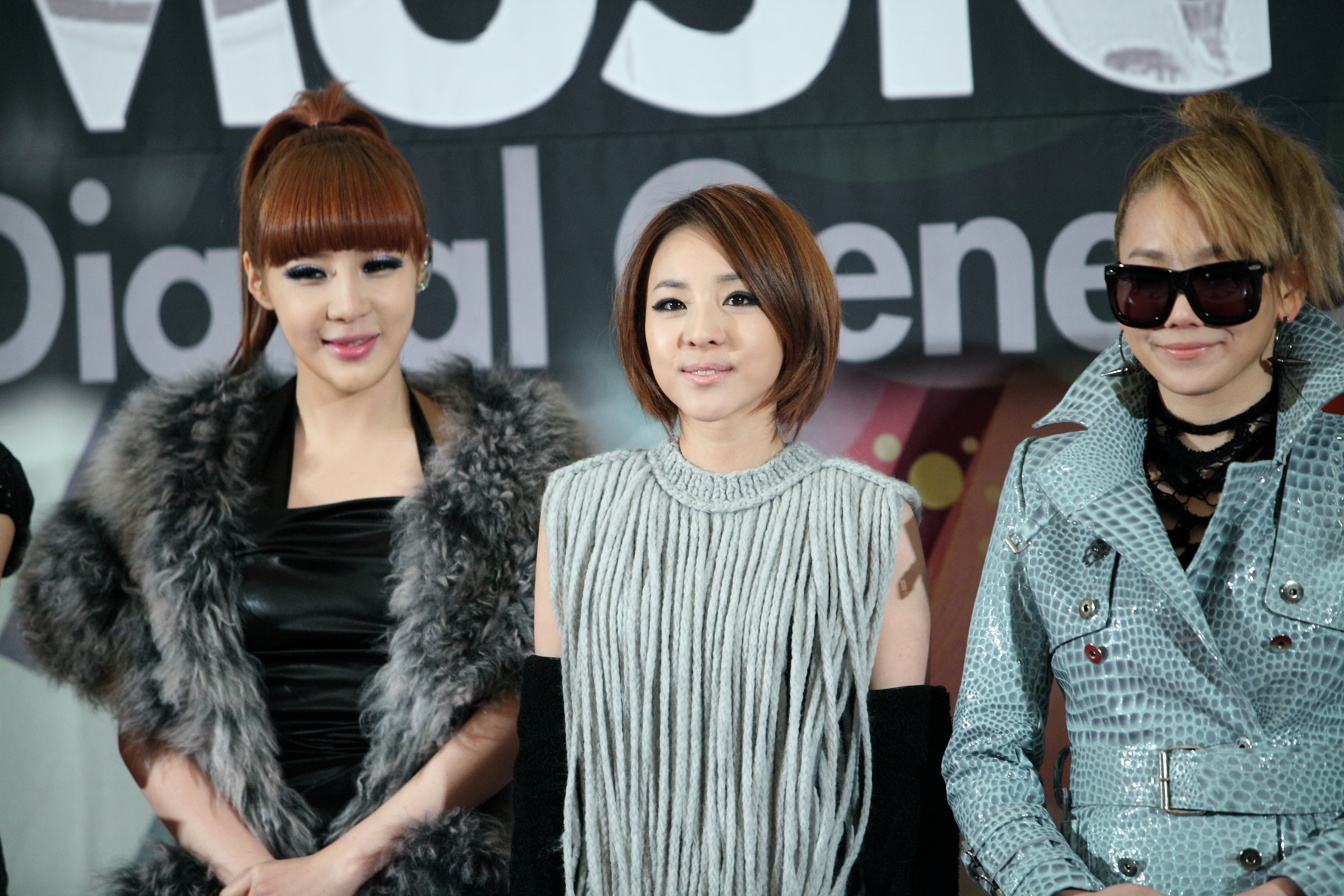
2NE1 at the 2010 Melon Music Awards

The song won Song of the Month (September) from the Cyworld Digital Music Awards, and was nominated for Song of the Year at the 2010 Melon Music Awards. In addition, the group won three mutizens for the song on the Korean music programs Inkigayo and Music Bank.

Awards and nominations
Year	Organization	Award	Result	Ref.
2010	Cyworld Digital Music Awards	Song of the Month – September	Won	
2010	Melon Music Awards	Song of the Year	Nominated	
2010	Melon Music Awards	Hot Trend Song	Nominated	
2011	Myx Music Awards	Favorite K-pop Video	Won	

Music program awards
Program	Date	Ref.
Music Bank	September 24, 2010	
Music Bank	October 1, 2010	
Inkigayo	October 10, 2010	

== Track listing ==
CD single – Japanese version
No.	Title	Lyrics	Music	Length
1.	"Go Away"	Shoko Fujibayashi; Sunny Boy	Teddy Park	3:55
2.	"It Hurts"	Tatsuji Ueda; E. Knock	E. Knock; Sunwoo Jung-a	4:15
3.	"Go Away" (Instrumental)		Park	3:55
4.	"It Hurts" (Instrumental)		E. Knock; Sunwoo Jung-a	4:15
Total length:				16:20

Limited Edition DVD – Japanese version Type A
No.	Title	Length
1.	"Go Away" (Music Clip)
2.	"Go Away" (Making Movie)

Limited Edition DVD – Japanese version Type B
No.	Title	Length
1.	"2NE1 TV Season 3 Episode 1 Highlight"
2.	"2NE1 TV JP" (YGEX Press Conference)

== Credits and personnel ==
- Teddy Park – arranger, composer, lyricist
- CL – vocalist, rapper
- Bom – vocalist
- Dara – vocalist
- Minzy – vocalist
- Shōko Fujibayashi – lyricist (Japanese version)

== Charts ==
=== Weekly charts ===
Chart (2010–2011) (Note: The chart positions in Japan are based on the Japanese version of "Go Away", released in 2011.)	Peak position
Japan (Japan Hot 100)	14
Japan (Oricon)	12
Japan (RIAJ Digital Track Chart)	49
Japan Adult Contemporary (Billboard)	24
South Korea (Gaon)	1
US World Digital Songs (Billboard)	6

=== Monthly charts ===
Chart (2010)	Peak position
South Korea (Gaon)	1

=== Year-end charts ===
Chart (2010)	Position
South Korea (Gaon)	4

== Sales ==
Country	Sales amount
South Korea (digital)	2,917,000
South Korea (ringtone)	547,325
Japan (physical)	21,150

== Release history ==
Country	Date	Format(s)	Version	Label	Ref.
Various	September 9, 2010	Digital download; streaming	Korean	YG Entertainment	
Japan	March 9, 2011	Ringtone	Korean	Avex Group	
Japan	November 2, 2011	Ringtone	Japanese	YGEX	
Japan	November 16, 2011	CD; CD+DVD; digital download	Japanese	YGEX	
