= Kiss (Dara song) =

Promotional single by Dara featuring CL

from the album To Anyone
- Language: Korean
- Released: September 7, 2009
- Recorded: 2009
- Genre: K-pop; dance-pop
- Length: 3:33
- Label: YG
- Songwriter: Teddy Park
- Producer: Teddy Park

Dara chronology
"Ang Ganda Ko" (2006)	"Kiss" (2009)

Music video
- "Kiss" on YouTube

"Kiss" (Korean: 입맞춤) is a song recorded by South Korean singer Dara, a member of girl group 2NE1. It features the vocals of her co-member CL and was used as part of a promotional campaign for Cass Beer. It was released as her first single in South Korea on September 7, 2009, and was later included on 2NE1's debut studio album To Anyone one year later.

== Background and development ==
After the release of 2NE1's latest single "I Don't Care", the group paused promotions in order to release solo material. "Kiss" was written and composed by YG Entertainment's exclusive Korean music producer Teddy Park, who is known as a member of 1TYM and for his work with Big Bang from 2006 up until early 2009. She had worked with him previously on 2NE1's debut eponymous extended play 2NE1. The lyrics of the song describes a woman who merely wants her lover to kiss her but is turned off by his attitude. In 2009, Oriental Brewery announced that it had chosen Sandara Park and actor Lee Minho to be their newest models for their beverage brand Cass 2x, and the song was used as a result.

== Release ==
"Kiss" was used as the background music for a Cass Beer commercial film that she herself starred in alongside actor Lee Minho. On the same day, the song was made available for digital download on September 7, 2009. "Kiss" was the first solo single released by her group, which was then followed by Park Bom's "You and I", and CL and Minzy's duet "Please Don't Go". Upon its release, the song peaked at number three on the weekly Melon chart and topped the Bugs chart. Later, the song was included in the group's first full-length album To Anyone, along with the singles released by the other members.

== Music video ==
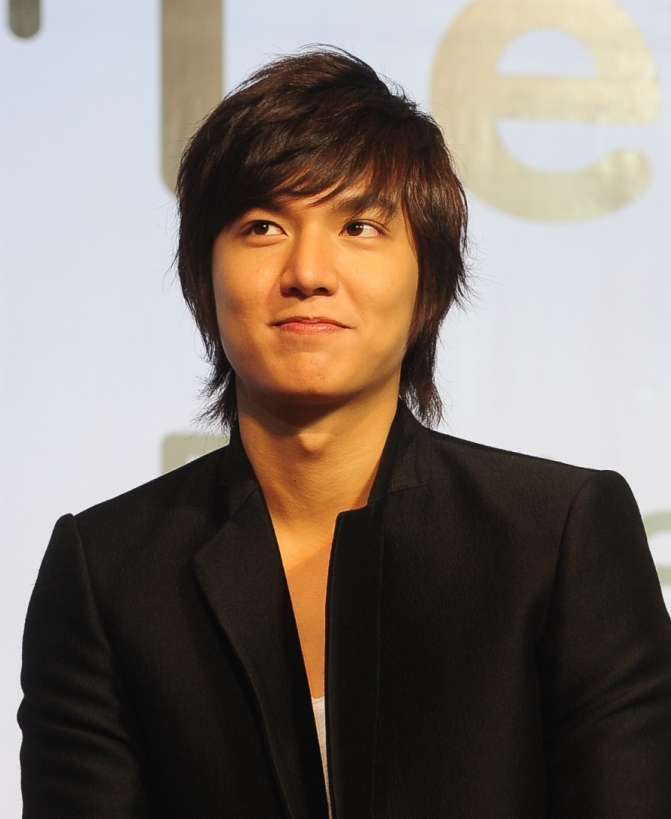
Lee Min-ho stars as Dara's opposite in the music video.

The music video of the song premiered on 2NE1's official YouTube channel on September 5, 2010. It features Sandara and Boys Over Flowers star Lee Min-ho in leading roles playing love interests. The initial kiss scene between the two was deemed one of the most famous events of 2009. Due to the positive response to the music video, a short sequel was made.

=== Synopsis ===
The opening sequence of the video features Lee and his friends partying at an outdoor pool party, where they spot Dara (a bartender) at the bar and make a bet between themselves to see if Lee can make Dara fall for him. He approaches with a diamond ring in hand, which he drops into a glass containing Cass 2x beer before pretending to walk away. Instead, he kisses her cheek, prompting Dara to pull him back and slap him in front of everyone before walking away herself. The scene shifts to the night of a concert, where Lee is seen leaning against his car, unable to forget Dara or the way she acted towards him at the club. In the distance, he then sees Dara again in the crowd. Surprised, he follows suit and stays with her, although begrudgingly on her part. However, during the duration of the concert, Dara eventually enjoys the concert with him and afterwards, Lee gives Dara a can ring from the beer he was drinking.

Later, Lee picks up Dara and tries to impress her with his wealth and invites her to a party, which she accepts, but being anything but impressed, she dumps the items he bought her in the trash when he leaves. Dara then arrives late to the party wearing a punky, rebellious outfit, the opposite of the clothing he had bought her. Lee attempts to call her on her cellphone but she deposits the phone in a glass of Cass Beer and surprises Lee by kissing him before dropping the diamond ring he had left with her earlier in his drink. Dara asks one of his friend's for the money he would have won if she fell for him and rips it in front of Lee, indicating she knew about the bet. The video ends with her leaving a distraught Lee, touching the can ring on her neck (now on a necklace), implying that she had fallen for him and that he had in fact, won the bet. The video featured Kim Woo-bin in one of his first acting roles.

In the sequel, Dara works as a bartender at an upscale restaurant, but is surprised to learn that Lee also works there. He asks after her well-being and says she'd gotten prettier since the last time he saw her. The video ends with them having reconciled.

== Live performances ==
Sandara Park has performed the song on 2NE1's debut concert tour, Nolza tour (2011). She has also added the song to the setlist for 2NE1's New Evolution Global Tour (2012). On December 10, 2016, Sandara Park performed the song on Pinoy Boyband Superstar, the first performance since 2NE1's disbandment the previous month.

== Release history ==
Country	Date	Format	Label
South Korea	September 7, 2009	Digital download, streaming	YG Entertainment
