= I Don't Care (2NE1 song) =

2009 single by 2NE1

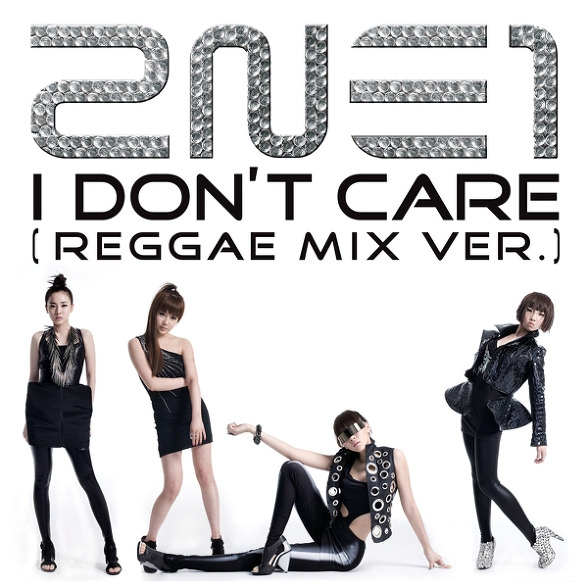
- Reggae Mix Version cover

Single by 2NE1

from the EP 2NE1
- Language: Korean
- Released: July 1, 2009
- Recorded: 2009
- Genre: Dance-pop
- Length: 3:59
- Label: YG
- Songwriters: Teddy Park; Kush
- Producers: Teddy Park; Kush

2NE1 singles chronology
"Fire" (2009)	"I Don't Care" (2009)	"Clap Your Hands" (2010)

Music video
- "I Don't Care" on YouTube

"I Don't Care" is a song by South Korean girl group 2NE1 from their debut extended play, 2NE1 (2009). Written and produced by Teddy Park and Kush, the song was released as the EP's second lead single on July 1, 2009, by YG Entertainment. The track has been characterized as a mid-tempo dance-pop track that incorporates elements of R&B and reggae, and was noted for marking a stylistic shift in the group's mainly previous hip-hop image. Lyrically, the song revolves around the theme of independence after a break up.

"I Don’t Care" was a commercial success following its release, becoming the best-selling single of 2009 on various South Korean networks. It won Song of the Year at the MAMA Awards and Cyworld Digital Music Awards for 2009 and was named one of the most loved songs in the history of Bugs! in 2020. The accompanying music video for the single was directed by Cha Eun-taek and was filmed over the course of two days in late June. It features the members visiting a fortune teller who then freezes time in order to play sabotage on their cheating boyfriends.

To promote the single, 2NE1 appeared on various music programs in South Korea throughout the months of July and August 2009. Two remix versions of the song were recorded and released to digital outlets: a reggae mix and a remix by Son Baek-young. A Japanese version of the track was later added to the group's debut Japanese studio-album, titled Collection (2012).

== Background and release ==
On June 25, 2009, YG Entertainment announced that a new single, titled "I Don't Care", would be released on July 1, with the group's debut mini-album set to be released soon thereafter on July 8. The single follows the first lead single "Fire", which was released in May and was met with positive critical and commercial reception. The song marked a change in the group's image, as "Fire" showcased a stronger and edgier feel; in contrast, YG Entertainment CEO Yang Hyun-suk stated that "I Don't Care" would enable the group to display a softer and more feminine image. In an interview, member CL stated that the song was "a warning message for the men and advice for the women". "I Don't Care" was then officially released for digital download and streaming on July 1, 2009, as the second single off of the mini-album.

Two remixes of "I Don't Care" were also recorded and made available for digital download, an unplugged reggae version mix that was released on September 3, 2009, and a remix by former 1TYM rapper Song Baek-kyoung which was released on September 28. The reggae mix was a more laid-back and reggae-tinged version of the song. It was arranged by Sunwoo Jung-ah, who also arranged and composed 2NE1's later single It Hurts (Slow), and features instruments such as wah wah guitars, horns, and timbales. The reggae mix was later added to the group's debut studio album To Anyone (2010). A Japanese-language version of the track was additionally recorded and included as part of the group's first Japanese studio album titled Collection, which was released by YGEX on March 28, 2012.

On December 21, 2020, more than 11 years after its release, the song trended in the Philippines following a domestic incident that occurred a day earlier.

== Music and lyrics ==
"I Don't Care" (Original Version)
A 21-second sample of 2NE1's "I Don't Care, which highlighted the group's shift into a more feminine image."

The release of "I Don't Care" marked a switch in image for the group, in comparison to 2NE1's debut single "Fire" earlier in the year, which carried a bold and fierce concept. According to YG Entertainment, "I Don't Care" was intended to possess a concept that focused on enhancing femininity rather than intensity, simultaneously allowing for a more "public friendly" image.

Musically, the song has been characterized as a medium-tempo pop track, containing a somewhat softer melody as compared to the group's debut single, in addition to incorporating influences of R&B and reggae. Written in the key signature of C♯ major, the song contains a tempo of 132 beats per minute. The integration of reggae was made due to the perception that South Korea had previously been a wasteland for the reggae music market, since reggae is strongly associated with summer music around the world. It was reported that through "Fire", it showed that reggae could work well in Korea, and "I Don't Care" aimed to further advance reggae-like styles into the country's mainstream music scene. Lyrically, the songwriting revolves around the themes of independence and confidence. It depicts the emotions of someone feeling the sense of renewal after initializing a break up with their troubled lover.

== Commercial performance ==
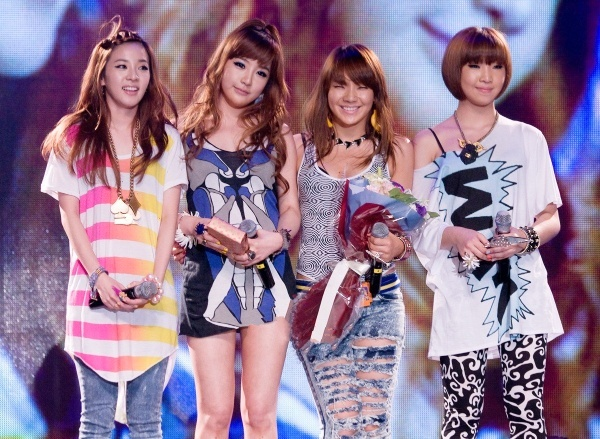
2NE1 at 36th & 37th Cyworld Digital Music Awards

"I Don't Care" was a commercial success, topping the daily charts in South Korea short after its release. It was ranked as the most downloaded track in the second week of July, and was subsequently named the month's best-selling single. Additionally, "I Don't Care" achieved first place on various South Korean music programs, including KBS's Music Bank, Mnet's M! Countdown, and SBS's Inkigayo. The group achieved their first triple crown (or three total wins) with the song on Inkigayo, and further led the Music Bank and M Countdown chart for multiple weeks.

"I Don't Care" was named by Bugs! as the best-selling single of 2009, leading its year-end chart with four of the group's other songs in the top 100, making 2NE1 the act with the most top 100 songs during the course of 2009. It was also 2009's best-selling single on Mnet and Monkey3 and was ranked the most popular song of the year by Cyworld, thus becoming the third consecutive track by a YG group to be named so by the network, with the previous two songs being "Lies" (2007) and "Haru Haru" (2008) by labelmate Big Bang.

== Accolades ==
"I Don't Care" won 12 first place trophies on domestic music programs, including triple crowns on M Countdown and Inkigayo. It won the Song of the Year prize at both the 2009 Mnet Asian Music Awards and Cyworld Digital Music Awards, making 2NE1 the first group to win a daesang (grand prize) in the same year of debut.

Awards and nominations for "I Don't Care"
Organization	Year	Award	Result	Ref.
Bugs Music Awards	2020	20th Anniversary – Most Loved Music	Won	
Cyworld Digital Music Awards	2009	Song of the Year	Won	
Cyworld Digital Music Awards	2009	Song of the Month – July	Won	
Cyworld Digital Music Awards	2009	Bonsang Award (Top 10)	Won	
Cyworld Digital Music Awards	2009	Best Rookie Group	Won	
GQ Awards	2009	This Year's Song	Won	
Korean Music Awards	2010	Best R&B & Soul Song	Nominated	
Melon Music Awards	2009	Song of the Year	Nominated	
Mnet 20's Choice Awards	2009	Hot Girl Group Style	Nominated	
Mnet Asian Music Awards	2009	Song of the Year	Won	
Mnet Asian Music Awards	2009	Best New Female Artist	Won	
Mnet Asian Music Awards	2009	Best Composition (Note: Teddy Park was credited as nominee, along with "Fire")	Won	
Mnet Asian Music Awards	2009	Best Dance Performance	Nominated	
Rhythmer Awards	2010	R&B Song of the Year	Nominated	

Music program awards
Program	Date	Ref.
Music Bank	July 17, 2009	
Music Bank	July 24, 2009	
Music Bank	July 31, 2009	
Music Bank	August 7, 2009	
Music Bank	August 14, 2009	
M Countdown	July 23, 2009	
M Countdown	August 6, 2009	
M Countdown	August 13, 2009	
M Countdown	August 27, 2009	
Inkigayo	July 26, 2009	
Inkigayo	August 2, 2009	
Inkigayo	August 9, 2009	

== Music video and promotion ==
The music video for "I Don't Care" premiered on Melon on July 9, 2009, and was uploaded to YG Entertainment's official YouTube channel on August 27. It was later re-uploaded to the group's official channel on September 5, 2010. The video was directed by Cha Eun-taek, who had previously directed the video for labelmate Big Bang's "Lies", and was filmed over the course of two days on June 22 and 23, 2009. It features the members going to a fortune teller for advice after finding out about their cheating boyfriends over the phone. The fortune teller then freezes time and the members set off to find their boyfriends, who are seen flirting with other girls. They then set them up in unfavorable positions and play sabotage on them for fun. Actor Lee Jong-suk plays Dara's boyfriend in the music video.

Promotions for the single featured 2NE1 appearing on various music programs in South Korea throughout the months of July and August. The group debuted the song live on KBS2's Music Bank on July 10. The performance was met with positive reception among netizens, who complimented the youthful choreography matching the soft reggae melody, and further praised 2NE1 for their ability in showcasing a "different charm". The song went on to achieve the first-place position for multiple weeks on Music Bank, M! Countdown, and Inkigayo. It led the Music Bank chart for 5 consecutive weeks, becoming only one of the handful songs to do so. An unplugged "reggae" version of the song was performed on Inkigayo on August 30, signaling the end of regular promotions for the song. However, due to the remix's popularity, it was further released to digital outlets on September 3.

== Track listing ==
- Digital download
1. "I Don't Care" – 3:59
- I Don't Care – Reggae Mix
1. "I Don't Care" (Reggae Mix Version) – 3:52
- I Don't Care (Baek Kyoung Remix)
1. "I Don't Care" (Baek Kyoung Remix) – 4:14

== Charts ==
=== Weekly charts ===
Reggae mix
Chart (2010)	Peak position
South Korea (Gaon)	92

Chart (2024)	Peak position
South Korea (Circle)	112

Chart (2025)	Peak position
South Korea (Circle)	190

=== Monthly charts ===
Chart (2024)	Peak position
South Korea (Circle)	143

== Release history ==
Release dates and formats for "I Don't Care"
Region	Date	Format	Version	Label(s)	Ref.
Various	July 1, 2009	Digital download; streaming	Original	YG Entertainment	
South Korea	September 3, 2009	Digital download	Reggae mix	YG Entertainment	
South Korea	September 28, 2009	Digital download	Baek Kyoung remix	YG Entertainment	
