= Try to Follow Me =

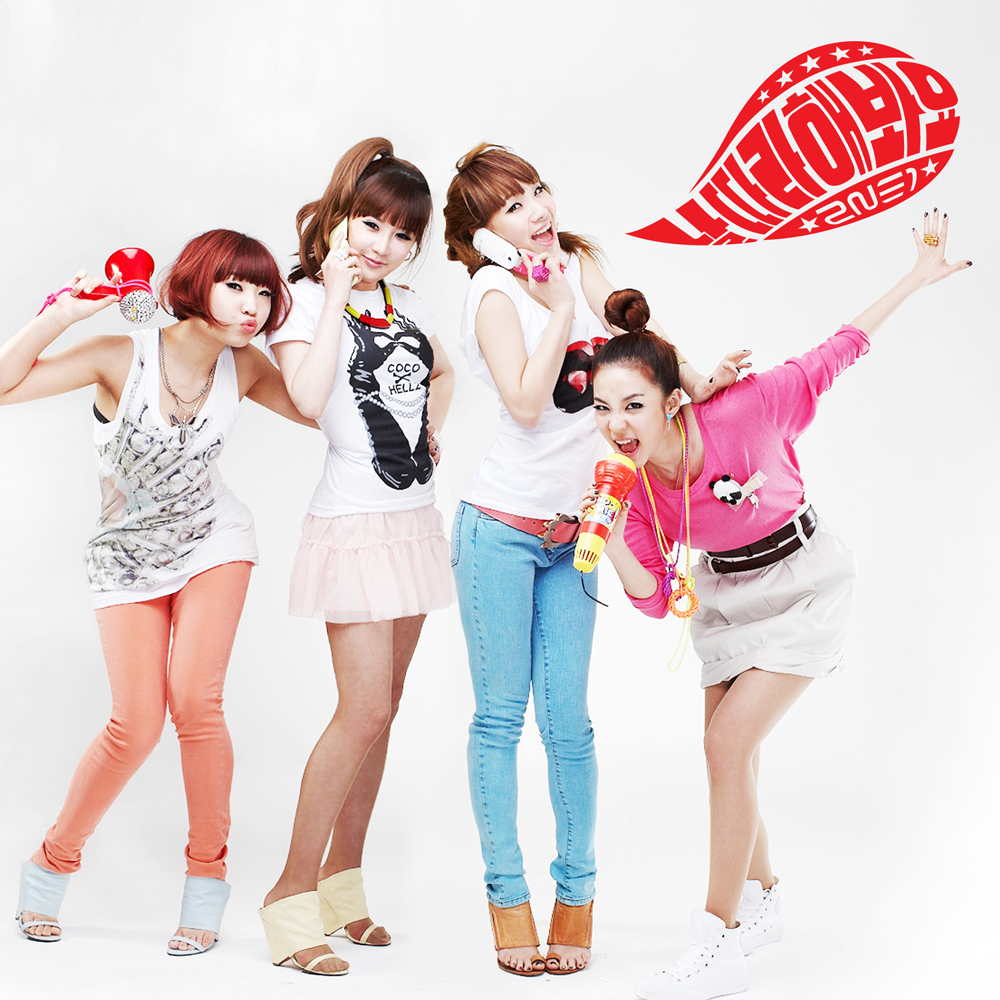

Promotional single by 2NE1

from the album To Anyone
- Released: February 9, 2010
- Recorded: 2010
- Genre: Electropop; hip-hop; dancehall
- Length: 3:07
- Label: YG Entertainment
- Songwriter: Teddy Park
- Producer: Teddy Park

Music video
- "Follow Me" on YouTube

"Try to Follow Me" (Korean: 날 따라 해봐요; RR: Nal ttara haebwayo; also known as "Follow Me") is a song by South Korean girl group 2NE1. It was originally released on February 9, 2010, to promote Samsung's "Corby CF" mobile phone. It later was released with the album "To Anyone" in September, 2010.

== History ==
"Try to Follow Me"
A sample of 2NE1's "Try to Follow Me."

The song was announced as a promotional single for Samsung's new phone, "Corby CF", just hours before the song's release.

On South Korea's official Gaon Digital Chart, "Try to Follow Me" landed at number one for the week of February 7 to February 13, 2010, and became the group's first number-one song on the chart, before dropping in the following weeks. By the end of 2010 "Try to Follow Me" was downloaded over 1,770,000 times.

== Critical reception ==
Music critic Joiseul from IZM gave the song 1.5 stars out of 5, pointing out the song's "infinite repetition of hooks", overuse of sound effects and autotune software. Joiseul also felt that the song's production was "out of focus" as compared to "Fire" or "Lollipop".

== Music video ==
There was no video planned for 2NE1's "Try to Follow Me" but since the popularity of the song, a video was made. This video premiered on March 11, 2010. It was filmed by Seo Hyun Seung sometime in February, the girls self-choreographed their dance parts.

It begins with CL in a suit singing the introduction. After, it shows CL and Dara sharing a motorcycle, then changes to, Minzy and Bom sharing another motorcycle. The verses shows, CL sealed onto a metal bathtub what is upside down with different cameras around her and in her second verse she is wearing a polka dot wig doing a dance. Bom shows her new edgy hair style and in her second verse, it shows her in her own high fashioned clothing. Minzy dances in front of a screen and in her second verse, it shows her laughing at her other self and dancing to the rhythm. Later on, Dara is seen with a gun-blaster as she fights against two Star Wars storm soldiers (later revealed to be CL and Minzy). When Dara shoots the camera with the blaster, it shows all the members in a jungle scene doing a dance. At the end, it shows all of the members dressed up like old fashioned-actresses playing with their feather boas. They do a dance going into each other and then the members change clothes into hip-hop clothing then the song ends (as the song ends it shows CL blowing bubbles and with the scene of the cameras, but normally this was cut out from Korean music channels and the TV show 2NE1 TV).

== Charts ==
Chart (2010)	Peak position
South Korea (Gaon)	1

=== Year-end chart ===
Chart (2010)	Position
South Korea (Gaon)	128
