= Clap Your Hands (2NE1 song) =

2010 single by 2NE1

Single by 2NE1

from the album To Anyone
- Released: September 8, 2010
- Recorded: 2010
- Genre: K-pop; hip hop; urban; dancehall
- Length: 3:41
- Label: YG
- Songwriter: Kim Byung-hoon
- Producer: Kim Byung-hoon

2NE1 singles chronology
"I Don't Care" (2009)	"Clap Your Hands" (2010)	"Go Away" (2010)

Music video
- "Clap Your Hands" on YouTube

"Clap Your Hands" (Korean: 박수쳐; RR: Baksucheo) is a song by South Korean girl group 2NE1. It was released on September 8, 2010 as one of the lead singles from their first full album To Anyone, which was released one day later. The song became a hit on various on and offline charts in addition to peaking at number 3 on the Gaon Digital Chart.

== Background ==
The song was written and produced by Kim Byung-hoon (who uses the aliases of "e.knock" and "Kush") and was announced as one of three lead singles from their album To Anyone, along with "Go Away" and "Can't Nobody". A 30-second teaser was released prior to the track’s official release. The music video for "Clap Your Hands" was uploaded to 2NE1's official YouTube channel on September 8, 2010 and to YG Entertainment's official channel the next day.

=== Music video ===
The music video begins with the 2NE1 members sitting on a bench with a car next to them in a street setting, with "CLAP YOUR HANDS" graffitied on the brick wall behind them. The girls begin dancing while wearing black camouflage tracksuits. The second verse takes place in a martial arts dojo, with the same bench as the first verse. The next scene takes place in a jungle set with tribal signs written on their arms and face, and features CL, Dara and Minzy's performing their rap verses. The final scene takes place in a cyperspace-like setting, with the girls wearing chrome heart hoodies accompanied by five backup dancers dressed in all-white with black face coverings.

== Commercial performance ==
"Clap Your Hands" peaked at number 3 on the Gaon Digital Chart in the week of September 12, with "Go Away" and "Can't Nobody" occupying the number one and number two positions respectively. The song also took first place on Mnet's M! Countdown on September 16 after the band's performance. It was ranked the fourth best-selling song in South Korea of September 2010 and sold more than 1.8 million digital units by the end of the year.

== Accolades ==
Music program awards
Program	Date
M Countdown	September 16, 2010

== Charts ==
=== Weekly charts ===
Chart	Peak position
South Korea (Gaon)	3
US World Digital Songs (Billboard)	4

=== Year-end charts ===
Chart (2010)	Position
South Korea (Gaon)	51

== Track listing ==
- Digital download
1. Clap Your Hands – 3:41

== Credits and personnel ==
- Kim Byung-hoon (a.k.a. "Kush" or "e.knock"): Arranger, composer, lyricist
- CL: Vocalist / Rapper
- Bom: Vocalist
- Dara: Vocalist / Rapper
- Minzy: Vocalist / Rapper
