= It Hurts (Slow) =

Single by 2NE1

from the album To Anyone
- A-side: "Go Away" (Japan)
- Released: October 31, 2010
- Recorded: 2010
- Genre: R&B
- Length: 4:16
- Label: YG
- Songwriters: E. Knock; Sunwoo Jung-a
- Producers: E. Knock; Sunwoo Jung-a

2NE1 singles chronology
"Can't Nobody" (2010)	"It Hurts (Slow)" (2010)	"Lonely" (2011)

Music video
- "It Hurts (Slow)" on YouTube

"It Hurts (Slow)" (Korean: 아파 (Slow); RR: Apa (Slow), often simply referred to as "It Hurts") is a song by South Korean girl group 2NE1, from their debut album To Anyone. The song was produced by e.knock and Sunwoo Jung-a. The song was released as the seventh single from the album. It was first performed on October 31, 2010, with a music video releasing later that night. The song was praised highly for its unique sound.

The song also serves as the B-side to the group's Japanese debut single, "Go Away".

== Background ==
"It Hurts (Slow)"
A sample of 2NE1's "It Hurts (Slow)."

The song was produced by e.knock and Sunwoo Junga. It is considered an R&B song. At the album's release, it was praised as one of the best cuts from the album. On September 28, the song was performed live for the first time on Yoo Hee-yeol's Sketchbook. One month later, it was officially confirmed as a follow-up promotional single to the original three title tracks.

As a single, it was first performed on Seoul Broadcasting System's The Music Trend on Halloween. The music video was released later that evening, and was themed for Halloween.

== Critical reception ==
"It Hurts (Slow)" was received well. Star News also praised the song for being different from the rest of the album and an entirely different pace.

== Chart performance ==
The song peaked at number four upon release of To Anyone on the Gaon Chart and number six on the monthly chart for September, 2010. The song was used as a promotional single until October 31, though, where it recharted at a peak of nine. "It Hurts" has sold over 1.7 million downloads by the end of 2010, plus an additional 600.000 downloads in 2011, it has sold over 2.300.000 digital copies, becoming one of the more successful singles from "To Anyone".

== Music video ==
The music video was directed by Kim Hye-Jung, and starred model Lee Su-hyeok. The video was set on Dara and had a Gothic dark theme, due to its release on Halloween night. It shows the girls singing on top of a roof, with leaves falling down and mist everywhere. It also shows scenes with Dara in her house, brushing her hair, sitting in front of a dining table with a ruined cake on top. As the bridge begins, Dara wishes on a candle that her past love would come back. Her wish came true and he appears. They hug each other but only for a matter of time, as the candle is blown off again. The video ends with Dara shedding tears and just sitting alone in front of the ruined cake.

== Credits and personnel ==
- Songwriting: e.knock
- Composing: e.knock, Sunwoo Junga
- Arranger: Sunwoo Junga

== Charts ==
=== Weekly charts ===
Chart (2010)	Peak position
South Korea (Gaon)	4

=== Monthly charts ===
Chart (2010)	Peak position
South Korea (Gaon)	6

=== Yearly charts ===
Chart (2010)	Position
South Korea (Gaon)	30
