= 2NE1 (2009 EP) =

EP by 2NE1

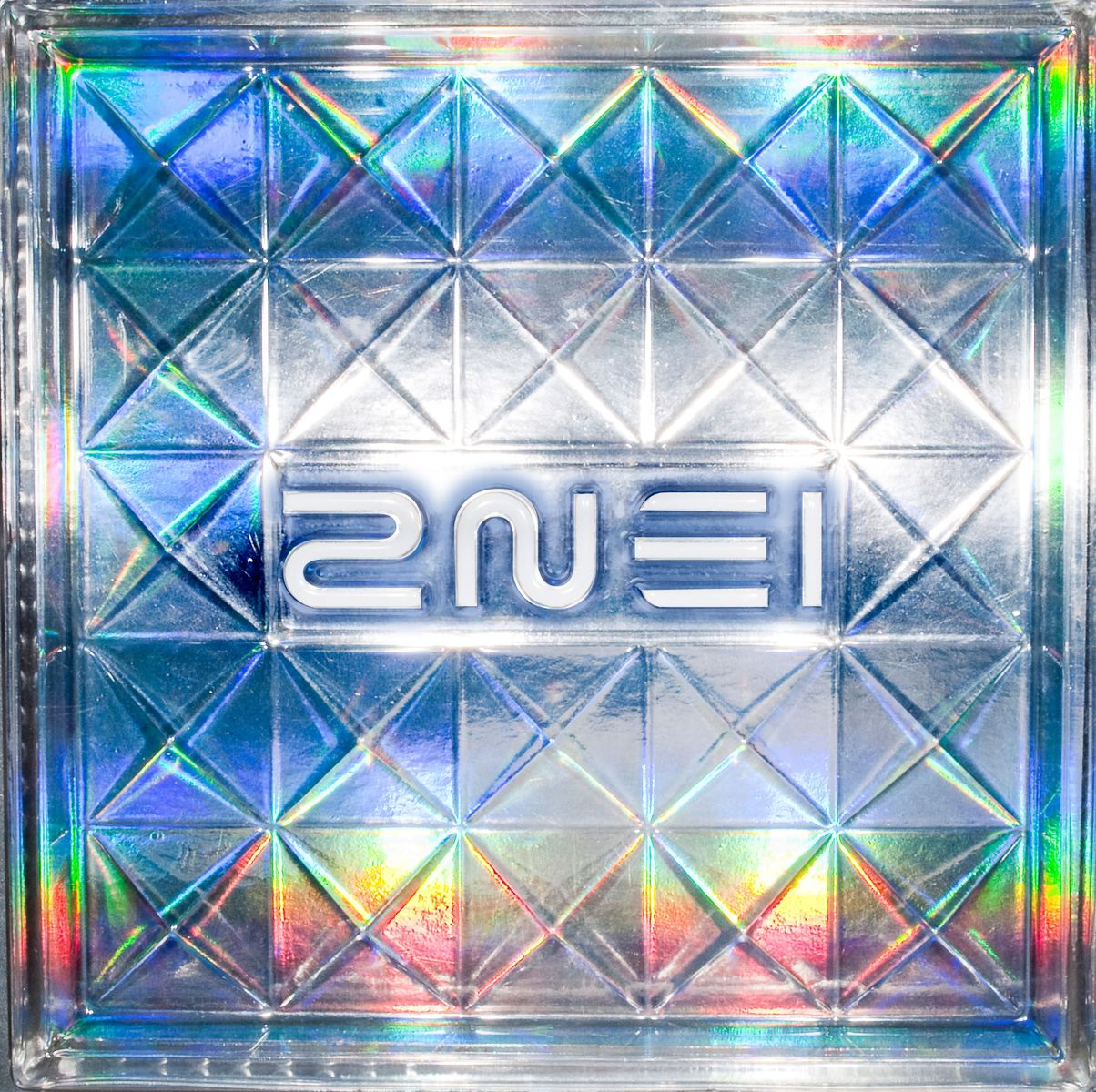

EP by 2NE1
- Released: July 8, 2009
- Recorded: 2009
- Genres: K-pop; hip hop; R&B; electropop; dance-pop
- Length: 25:31
- Language: Korean
- Label: YG
- Producers: Teddy; Kush

2NE1 chronology
2NE1 (2009)	To Anyone (2010)

Alternative cover
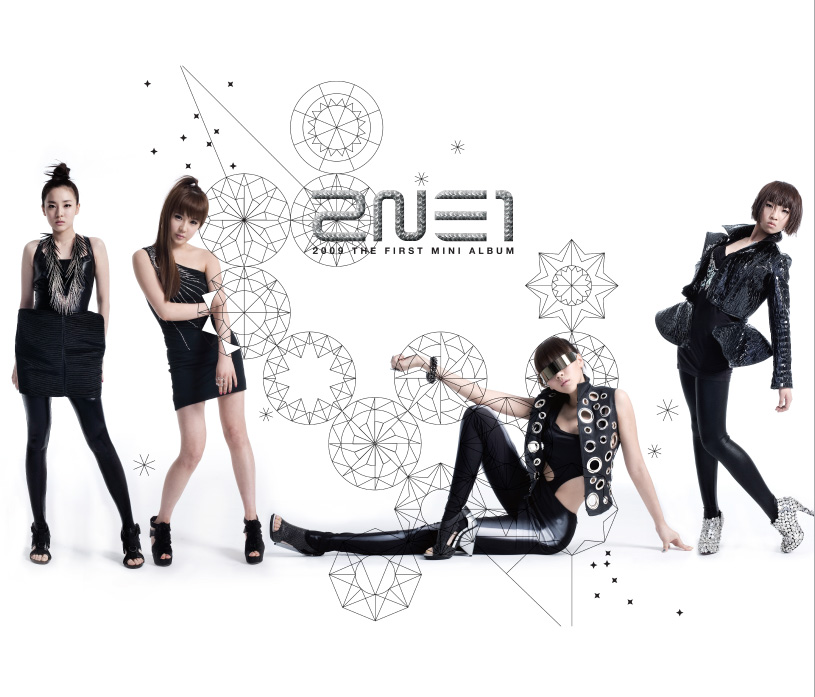
- Artwork for most of Asian releases

Singles from 2NE1
- 1. "Lollipop" Released: March 27, 2009; 2. "Fire" Released: May 6, 2009; 3. "I Don't Care" Released: July 1, 2009

2NE1 (also known as 2NE1 1st Mini Album) is the debut extended play (EP) by South Korean girl group 2NE1. YG Entertainment released the seven-track record via digital and physical formats on July 8, 2009. Composed and produced by South Korean producers Teddy Park and Kush, the EP showcases a blend of pop, dance, R&B, and hip-hop styles.

2NE1 experienced immediate commercial success in South Korea upon release, becoming the best-selling album by a female artist and the third best-selling album overall in 2009. It was also released in several other Asian territories, including Thailand, the Philippines, and Japan. The Japanese edition, distributed by Avex's Rhythm Zone, was made available on March 16, 2011.

To promote the album, three singles were released: the LG Cyon promotional single "Lollipop", "Fire", and "I Don't Care". All three singles achieved success on the South Korean charts, with "I Don't Care" winning Song of the Year at the 2009 Mnet Asian Music Awards. In 2014, Star News recognized 2NE1's debut EP as one of the most successful digital albums in South Korean history. By September 2016, the EP had sold over 225,000 physical copies in the country.

== Background ==
2NE1's first song was "Lollipop", digitally released on March 27, 2009. The song was created for LG Cyon to promote their Lollipop phone, and it was a joint release with Big Bang; the commercial/music video debuted on March 28, 2009. Although it was not a promoted single (as it was an advertisement song, there were problems with network chart eligibility), "Lollipop" proved to be a strong chart hit, going to number one on various online charts and topping music television network Mnet's online chart for four weeks in a row. It was also profiled in Perez Hilton's blog. However, questions were raised about the group's future, as the song's success was attributed to the popularity of BigBang.

On April 30, Yang Hyun-suk revealed that 2NE1's debut song would be a hip hop and reggae song, and that it would be digitally released on May 6, 2009. Titled "Fire", the song was fully written and produced by 1TYM's Teddy Park. Teasers of the song were released on their official website at the beginning of May, with a 20-second clip released on May 1.

== Singles ==
"Lollipop", written and produced by Teddy Park, was digitally released on March 27, 2009. Despite not being promoted traditionally by both groups, the song nonetheless was a major success in South Korea; giving the girls a number one song before their debut.

"Fire" became a hit on various on- and offline charts. It was released as planned on May 6, with two versions of the music video—a "space" version and a "street" version—released the same day. The videos received over one million views in a day; the view count then increased to two million.

"I Don't Care" was the third single from 2NE1, co-produced by Teddy and YG's newly signed rising producer Kush. Soon after its release, the music video was also profiled in Perez Hilton's blog who declared them his "favorite" Korean girl-group. The single went on to win Song of the Year at the 2009 Mnet Asian Music Awards, making them the first group to win the accolade in the same year of debut, and the second rookie to win after Big Bang for "Lies" (2007).

== Commercial performance ==
The extended play was a commercial success in South Korea. It recorded over 50,000 pre-orders within a week—a high amount for a rookie group at the time, and sold over 80,000 copies within two weeks after its release. On August 10, it was reported that the EP surpassed sales of 100,000 copies. On the South Korean Hanteo record chart, 2NE1 1st Mini Album was the best-selling album by a female artist and the third best-selling album overall during 2009, behind Super Junior's Sorry, Sorry and G-Dragon's Heartbreaker.

All three singles from 2NE1 1st Mini Album ranked within the top 10 on the year-end Melon chart for 2009, while five of its tracks ranked within the top 100—the most by any act during the year. In January 2014, Star News named the record the second-most successful digital album released in South Korea since 2004, tied with SG Wannabe's Saldaga (2005) and Big Bang's Stand Up (2008). It continued to show strong sales by charting on the Gaon Album Chart year-end issue for 2010, selling an additional 40,949 copies. It has since sold over 225,000 copies as of September 2016.

== Promotion ==
The group's first performance of the song was on May 17, 2009, on SBS's Inkigayo. beginning the group's activities. Their first performance was also included in Perez Hilton's blog once again, showing his interest towards the group.

Both the song and the group have been very popular online, with the song topping M.Net's online chart and the group's name becoming a top search term. The group was also rewarded with three Cyworld Digital Music Awards, with both "Lollipop" and "Fire" winning "Song of the Month" awards and the group winning "Rookie of the Month" for May 2009. They received their first Mutizen award during their fourth stage performance in SBS Inkigayo (Popular Song) on June 14, 2009. They received their second Mutizen award on SBS Inkigayo (Popular Song) on June 21, 2009. For closed the promotion of the first mini album was released the song "In The Club" as first promotional single of the album.

== Accolades ==
Awards and nominations for 2NE1 1st Mini Album
Year	Award-giving body	Category	Result	Ref.
2009	GQ Korea Awards	This Year's Album (Album of the Year)	Won	
2009	Melon Music Awards	Album of the Year	Nominated	
2009	Rhythmer Awards	R&B Album of the Year	Nominated	

== Track listing ==
2NE1 1st Mini Album – Standard edition
No.	Title	Lyrics	Music	Arrangement	Length
1.	"Fire"	Teddy	Teddy	Teddy	3:42
2.	"I Don't Care"	Teddy, Kush	Teddy, Kush	Teddy, Kush	3:58
3.	"In the Club"	Teddy, Kush	Teddy, Kush	Teddy, Kush	3:44
4.	"Let's Go Party"	Masta Wu	Teddy	Teddy	3:48
5.	"Pretty Boy"	Teddy	Teddy	Teddy	3:25
6.	"Stay Together"	Kush, Byung-Hoon Kim	Kush, Kim	Kush, Kim	3:44
7.	"Lollipop" (Bonus track) (with Big Bang)	Teddy	Teddy	Teddy	3:08
Total length:					25:31

2NE1 – Japanese edition (bonus tracks)
No.	Title	Producer(s)	Length
8.	"I'm Busy"	PK, Big Tone	3:38
9.	"Please Don't Go" (CL and Minzy)	Teddy Park	3:19
10.	"Kiss" (Dara solo) (featuring CL)	Teddy Park	3:32
Total length:			36:17

2NE1 – Japanese DVD
No.	Title	Length
1.	"Fire" (Space Version)	3:43
2.	"I Don't Care"	3:59

2NE1 – Thailand & Taiwan CD and Philippines Vinyl LP
No.	Title	Length
7.	"Kiss" (Dara solo) (featuring CL)	3:31
8.	"You and I" (Bom solo)	3:53
9.	"Please Don't Go" (CL and Minzy)	3:31
10.	"Try to Follow Me"	3:25
11.	"Lollipop" (Bonus track) (with Big Bang)	3:05

2NE1 – Philippines and Taiwan edition DVD
No.	Title	Producer(s)	Length
1.	"Fire" (Space Version)	Teddy Park	3:43
2.	"Fire" (Street Version)	Teddy Park, Kush	3:43
3.	"I Don't Care"	Teddy Park, Kush	3:59
4.	"You and I"	Teddy Park, Kush, Masta Wu	3:53
5.	"Try to Follow Me" (날 따라해봐요)	Teddy Park, Kush	3:25
6.	"Lollipop" (with Big Bang) (Taiwan only)	Teddy Park	3:05

== Production ==
- Mastering: Tom Coyne (Sterling Sound)

== Charts ==
=== Weekly charts ===
Chart (2010–2011)	Peak position
South Korean Albums (Gaon)	3
Japanese Albums (Oricon) Japanese edition	24
Japanese Top Albums (Billboard) Japanese edition	28

=== Monthly charts ===
Chart (2010)	Peak position
South Korean Albums (Gaon)	10

=== Year-end charts ===
Chart (2009)	Position
South Korean Albums (Gaon)	3

Chart (2010)	Position
South Korean Albums (Gaon)	34

== Sales ==
Region	Certification	Certified units/sales
Japan	—	7,200
South Korea	—	225,301

== Release history ==
Release dates and formats for 2NE1 1st Mini Album
Region	Date	Version(s)	Format(s)	Label(s)
Various	July 8, 2009	Korean	Digital download; streaming	YG Entertainment
South Korea	July 8, 2009	Korean	CD; digital download; streaming	YG Entertainment
Thailand	July 6, 2010	Korean	CD	GMM Grammy
Philippines	January 15, 2011	Korean	CD+DVD	Universal Records
Japan	March 16, 2011	Japanese (compilation album)	CD; CD+DVD; digital download	Rhythm Zone
