= Nolza Tour =

2011 concert tour by 2NE1

Nolza!
- Tour by 2NE1
- Promotional poster for the tour
- Location: Asia
- Associated album: 2NE1
- Start date: August 26, 2011
- End date: October 2, 2011
- Legs: 2
- No. of shows: 9
- Attendance: 82,000
- Box office: $9,000,000 (Japan leg)

2NE1 concert chronology
- Nolza! (2011); New Evolution Global Tour (2012)

Nolza! was the first concert tour by South Korean girl group 2NE1. The tour supported their second extended play (EP), 2NE1 (2011), and its Japanese version, Nolza. Members of Big Bang, Taeyang and GD & TOP, joined the tour as guest performers. Spanning nine dates in South Korea and Japan, tickets for all shows were quickly sold out, with media outlets reporting over 300,000 people applying for tickets in Japan.

The Japanese leg of the tour attracted a total of 70,000 attendees, drawing the largest amount of spectators for a debut concert tour by a Korean artist in Japan at the time. A live album DVD from the concerts in South Korea was released by YG Entertainment in November 2011, which reached number four on the Gaon Album Chart and number one on the Taiwanese G-Music DVD chart. A live album of the concerts in Yokohama was released in February 2012.

== Background ==
Two concerts were initially scheduled at the Olympic Hall in Seoul for August 27 and 28, 2011, with both shows being sold out instantly. A concert in Bangkok, Thailand, which was scheduled for October 29, was cancelled due to the effects of the 2011 Thailand floods.

== Commercial performance ==
In Seoul, 60,000 people were recorded queuing for only 8,000 available seats, therefore a third concert was added for August 26. Interest was also huge for the Japanese leg of the tour, with 300,000 people queuing for concert tickets. Due to the amount of interest in Japan, tour organizers considered adding an additional concert at the Tokyo Dome.

A total 70,000 people attended the six concerts in Japan, and all available seats were sold out on the same day of the general release on September 4, 2011. It was the largest debut concert tour in the country by a K-pop group at the time. The final show in Chiba at the Makuhari Messe on October 2, 2011, was attended by 12,000 people. Billboard noted that "Hundreds of fans unable to enter the sold out venue milled around on the perimeter, staying for the entire show despite having no chance of seeing the performance."

Tickets for the Japanese leg of the tour were priced at ¥7,500. Media outlets estimated that the leg grossed ₩7.87 billion (US$7.1 million) in ticket sales, with additional revenue from merchandise and product sales bringing the total amount to over ₩10 billion ($9 million).

== Set list ==
Setlist (Seoul, South Korea)
1. "Fire"
2. "Can't Nobody"
3. "Let's Go Party"
4. "I Don't Care"
5. "Please Don't Go" (CL & Minzy)
6. "Kiss" (Dara and CL)
7. "You & I" (Bom solo)
8. "Don't Cry" (Bom solo)
9. " Marvins Room + Did It On Em + The Leaders" (CL solo)
10. "Just Look at Me" (Minzy solo)
11. "It Hurts (Slow)"
12. "Lonely"
13. "In the Club"
14. "Pretty Boy"
15. "Don't Stop the Music"
16. "Clap Your Hands"
17. "Hate You"
18. "I Am the Best"
19. "Ugly"

Encore

20. "Stay Together"
21. "Go Away"
Setlist (Japan)
1. "Intro + Fire"
2. "Can't Nobody"
3. "Let's Go Party"
4. "I Don't Care"
5. "Please Don't Go" (CL & Minzy)
6. "Kiss" (Dara Solo feat. CL)
7. "You & I" (Bom Solo)
8. "Don't Cry" (Bom Solo)
9. "Marvins Room + Did It On Em + The Leaders" (CL solo)
10. "Only Look at Me" (Minzy feat. SOL/Taeyang)
11. "Oh Yeah" (BOM feat. GD&TOP)
12. "아파 (It Hurts)"
13. "Lonely"
14. "In the Club"
15. "Pretty Boy"
16. "Don't Stop the Music"
17. "박수 쳐 (Clap Your Hands)"
18. "Hate You"
19. "내가 제일 잘 나가 (I Am the Best)"
20. "Ugly"

Encore

1. "Stay Together"
2. "Go Away"

== Tour dates ==
List of concert dates
Date	City	Country	Venue	Attendance
August 26, 2011	Seoul	South Korea	Olympic Hall	12,000
August 27, 2011	Seoul	South Korea	Olympic Hall	12,000
August 28, 2011	Seoul	South Korea	Olympic Hall	12,000
September 19, 2011	Yokohama	Japan	Yokohama Arena	70,000
September 20, 2011	Yokohama	Japan	Yokohama Arena	70,000
September 24, 2011	Kobe	Japan	World Memorial Hall	70,000
September 25, 2011	Kobe	Japan	World Memorial Hall	70,000
October 1, 2011	Chiba	Japan	Makuhari Messe	70,000
October 2, 2011	Chiba	Japan	Makuhari Messe	70,000
Total				82,000

=== Cancelled shows ===
List of cancelled dates
Date	City	Country	Venue	Reason
October 29, 2011	Bangkok	Thailand	Impact Forum Hall 4	Cancelled due to flooding

== Broadcasts and recordings ==
=== 2NE1 1st Live Concert (Nolza!) ===
2NE1 1st Live Concert (Nolza!)

Live album by 2NE1
- Released: November 23, 2011
- Recorded: August 2011
- Genres: Pop, electropop, synthpop, hip hop, R&B, dance
- Length: 54:53
- Label: YG
- Producers: Teddy Park, e.knock

2NE1 chronology
2NE1 (2011)	2NE1 1st Live Concert (Nolza!) (2011)	Collection (2012)

2NE1 1st Live Concert (Nolza!) is the first live album of South Korean girl group 2NE1. The album was released on November 23, 2011, by YG Entertainment.

The album was recorded during the group's headlining tour Nolza which was held at the Olympic Hall at Olympic Park Korea in Seoul, South Korea from August 26–28, 2011.

Track listing

No.	Title	Length
1.	"Fire (Live)"	3:45
2.	"Can't Nobody (Live)"	3:37
3.	"Let's Go Party (Live)"	3:51
4.	"I Don't Care (Live)"	5:00
5.	"Kiss (Live)" (Dara solo featuring CL)	3:26
6.	"You and I (Live)" (Bom solo)	3:06
7.	"Don't Cry (Live)" (Bom solo)	2:18
8.	" It Hurts (Slow) [Live]" (아파 (Slow))	4:45
9.	"Lonely (Live)"	3:34
10.	"Pretty Boy (Live)"	4:44
11.	"Don't Stop the Music (Live)"	3:51
12.	"Clap Your Hands (Live)" (박수쳐)	3:43
13.	"I Am the Best (Live)" (내가 제일 잘 나가)	3:31
14.	"Ugly (Live)"	5:13
15.	"Go Away (Live)"	4:48
Total length:		54:53

=== Charts ===
==== Weekly charts ====
Chart (2011)	Peak position
Japanese DVD/Blu-ray (Oricon)	8
South Korean Albums (Gaon)	4
Taiwanese DVD Chart (G-Music)	1
