= Untitled (2011 film) =

2011 British found footage horror film by Shaun Troke

- Film poster
- Directed by: Shaun Troke
- Written by: Shaun Troke; Steven Jarrett
- Produced by: Shaun Troke; Stuart Kennedy; Michael Lonsdale
- Starring: Shaun Troke; Nikki Harrup; Leonora Moore; Danny Goldberg
- Music by: Kris Sanders; Carl Troke; Shaun Troke
- Production company: Shaunywa Films
- Release date: September 2011 (American Film Festival)
- Country: United Kingdom
- Language: English
- Budget: £2,000

Untitled is a 2011 British drama-horror film directed by Shaun Troke. Presented in the style of found footage, the film stars Troke alongside Nikki Harrup, Leonora Moore and Danny Goldberg.

== Premise ==
A filmmaker and his crew spend a weekend making a documentary in a cottage in Wales. Their film is never completed due to sinister forces in the building.

== Cast ==
- Shaun Troke as Shaun
- Nikki Harrup as Nikki
- Leonora Moore as Leo
- Danny Goldberg as Danny
- Steve Purbrick as Evan Driscoll
- Holly Kenyon as Celyn Bowen

== Production ==
Alongside writer Steven Jarrett, Troke explored the background mythology of the film and had created a script by early 2009. Troke had originally intended to shoot the film by the end of 2009, but, after he was hired to direct the horror film Sparrow, production on Untitled halted. After working with both Moore and Harrup on Sparrow, Troke ultimately decided to cast both of them in the lead female roles in Untitled.

== Accolades ==
The film won 'Best Narrative Feature' at the American International Film Festival in September 2011. Untitled will go on a limited cinematic release in 2012.

== Marketing and release ==
Prior to festival release, Untitled used a viral marketing campaign by promoting various clips of the film via the film's official YouTube channel. Similar to many mockumentary films, this footage was presented as "genuine". Untitled premiered at the American International Film Festival in September 2011.
