= Kingston School of Art =

Art school of Kingston University London

- Type: Public
- Established: 1899 (as Kingston School of Science and Art); 1930 (as Kingston School Art); 2017 (re-established)
- Parent institution: Kingston University London
- Dean: Nick Gorse
- Students: 2,801
- Undergraduates: 2,194
- Postgraduates: 538
- Doctoral students: 69
- Location: Kingston upon Thames, London, United Kingdom
- Campus: Suburban
- Website: Official website

Kingston School of Art (KSA) is an art school in Kingston upon Thames, part of Kingston University London.

The school teaches a variety of art- and design-related subjects, including fashion, graphic and product design, illustration and animation, film and photography, architecture, performing and visual arts.

It was first established in 1899 as the Kingston School of Science and Art. In 1930 it was established as a separate school and has been based on its own art school campus since 1939. It was disestablished in 1970 by becoming part of Kingston Polytechnic, but a re-brand in 2017 introduced the name again. It is the oldest constituent part of Kingston University, which was established in 1992. The School of Art plays an important role in the cultural and social development of Kingston-upon-Thames.

== Notable alumni and faculty ==
(Year graduated in brackets)

- Fiona Banner (1991) - artist
- James Anthony Betts (1934) - faculty
- John Bratby (1950) - artist
- David Chipperfield - architect
- Eric Clapton (1961) - singer, songwriter
- Sandy Denny - Folk singer
- George Fisher Gilmour (1934) - artist, playwright, and filmmaker
- Matthew Hilton (1979) - industrial designer
- Sophie Hulme (2007) - fashion designer
- June Kirby - actress and model
- Jasper Morrison (1982) - product and furniture designer
- Tony Visconti - record producer, musician and singer
