= Troke =

Troke is a surname. Notable people with the surname include:

- Helen Troke (born 1964), British badminton player
- Shaun Troke (born 1978), British director and actor
- Catharine Troke (born 1960s), English badminton player
