= Mari Kim =

South Korean-Australian artist

- 마리킴
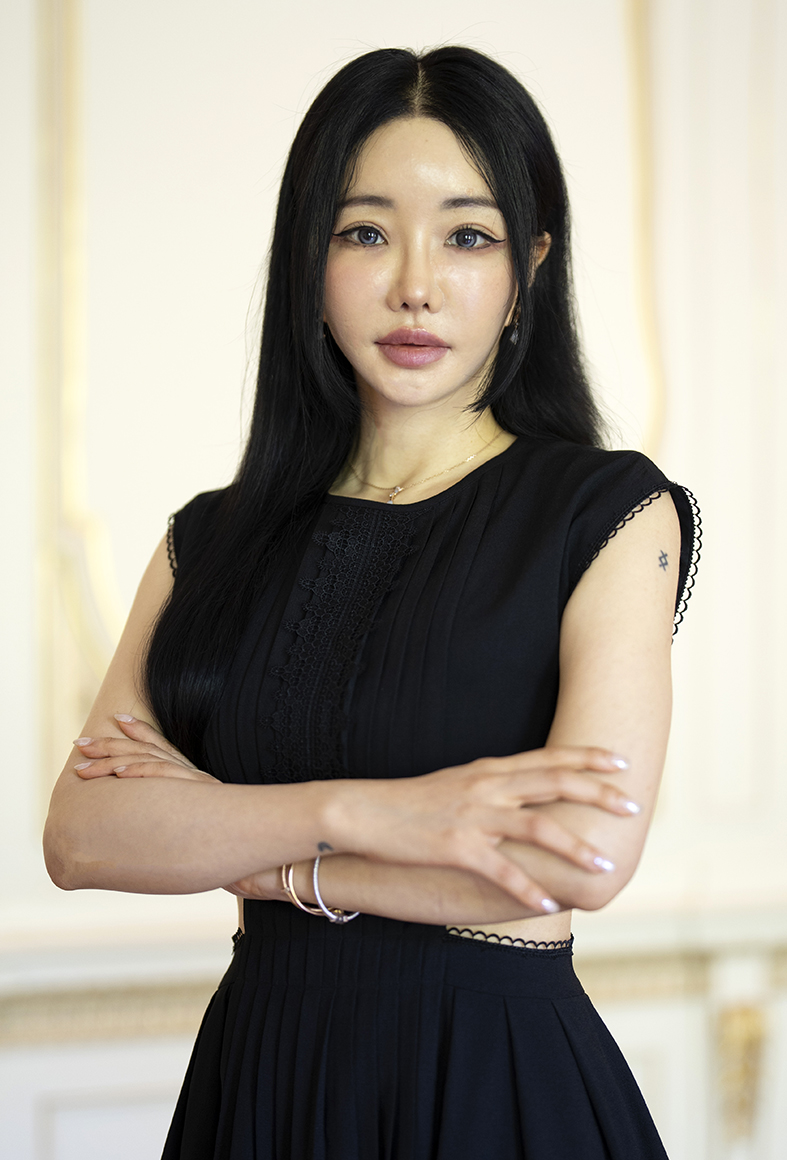
- Kim in 2026
- Born: Kim Mari (김마리); Busan, South Korea
- Known for: Contemporary art, pop art, animation
- Website: marikim.net

Mari Kim (Korean: 마리킴) is a South Korean-Australian contemporary artist from Seoul, South Korea. She is known for the big-eyed, cartoon-like female characters in her pop art paintings, called "eyedolls". Her work was popularly recognized after her 2011 collaboration with the K-pop girl group 2NE1, directing the animated music video for their single "Hate You". The single topped charts and the music video, with eyedoll action heroines portraying each of the four members, received over twenty million YouTube views.

== Life and career ==
Kim was born in Busan as Kim Mari (Korean: 김마리). Due to her father's job, the family moved often and she became close to her younger brother, Nara, as friendships were hard to maintain with the relocating. She consoled herself with crayons, drawing "everything and anything" and found her passion for art. She said, "I always liked fantasizing as a child."

During high school she read a lot of teen novels and comics. As her interest in art developed, she was unsure of making it a career. Her parents had artistic interests in photography, sketching and embroidery but hoped that she would pursue medicine or law. They compromised when she found a course of studies in visual arts through computers. After high school, she moved to Melbourne, Australia, and attended RMIT University where she received a master's degree in Game and creative media in 2011, after which she specialized in digital art.

She developed a love of Australia and stayed there for about a decade, along with her brother. She eventually returned to Seoul seeking an urban art scene in a familiar place.

In addition to her artwork, she has been an adjunct professor for Catholic University of Korea since 2009.

== Style and works ==
=== Animation ===
At RMIT she concentrated in animation, learning storytelling techniques, drawing, image and video creation and editing, which she incorporates in her private exhibits to enhance her flat surface works with images, videos and installation works. Movie directors that have inspired her are David Lynch, Shinya Tsukamoto, Sion Sono, Coen brothers, Lars von Trier, and The Wachowskis.

=== Eyedolls ===
In 2007, she started working with characters called "eyedolls", and during the 2015 "SETI" exhibit in Seoul, Kwon Mee-yoo of The Korea Times described them as "girls with large eyes and immature physiques [staring] from the canvas", with "funky colors and cute costumes". Her work is anime inspired, and of the large eyes, she has said "No matter if you're from the East or West, the eyes are the windows to your mind. I use the eyes as a wormhole; a gate to an imaginary and reality world."

Many of her works with the eyedolls include fairy tale and other popular characters and famous female icons, including Iron Lady, Catwoman, Wonder Woman, Audrey Hepburn, and Gloria Steinem. The Untitled Magazine said the characters' eyes "encompass a world of their own" and reveal "intricate patterns", somewhat like "looking through the lens of a kaleidoscope". Some of the depictions show women with cuts or stitched lips; Kim has cited American horror films as an influence on her work.

=== 2NE1 collaboration ===
In 2011, she was invited to collaborate with girl group 2NE1 on the music video for their song "Hate You" and album 2NE1, after the CEO of YG Entertainment purchased some of her paintings at an art exhibit. She worked on the planning process of the album and provided the artwork for the album cover. She produced and directed the animated music video for "Hate You", which depicts the members of the group carrying guns and saving the world from a monster, with her signature huge eyes and thick makeup.

=== Femininity ===
She has participated in several exhibitions that explore femininity, particularly in contemporary Korea. In New York City, in 2013, Amalgamated Gallery curator Gary Krimershmoys said of the "K- Surrogates" show from September through November, "The concept for the show came from a desire to show in America a unique Korean cultural and artistic vision, that does not conform to an international orthodoxy," and added, "These three female artists embodied a connection with this particular moment in Korea, where technology, an international K-pop explosion and a neo-feminist attitude are all intermixed to produce exceptional art."

In October 2015, she joined other women artists for The Untitled Magazine's exhibit "The "F” Word: Feminism in Art", an exhibit of twenty women artists in Tribeca, described as "each artist individually [addressing] concepts revolving around feminism with works that either challenge gender stereotypes or embrace female empowerment, with literal or metaphorical visual language."

At the 2016 Los Angeles Art Show her solo exhibit "Days of Future Past" showed works that portrayed a discussion of changing gender roles in Korea, including the traditional effects of Confucianism and the new generation that is "free to pursue their dreams regardless of gender".

== Awards and recognition ==
In October 2013, she was awarded the "ChungKang Culture Award", sponsored by the Ministry of Culture, Sports and Tourism for recognition of creative work as an artist that contributed to the culture industry. Her interpretations of the stereotypical image of women in the media were noted for recreating distinctive images of women, which had also appeared in stationery or shoes that were popular among the younger generation.

Her idol eyedoll artwork was featured in the 2014 film Tazza: The Hidden Card.

== Solo exhibitions ==
- 2008: "Sugar Candy Show", Ssamzie Illu-pop Gallery, Seoul
- 2009: "EYEDOLL SHOW", LVS Gallery, Seoul
- 2010: "A story about Anderson", Seo Kang University Mary Hall, Seoul
- 2010: "Big Head Show" Daegu, The Omni show room, Daegu
- 2011: "Child Play", Television 12 Gallery, Seoul
- 2012: "Famous Show in Dubai", Opera Gallery, Dubai, UAE
- 2012: "Famous Show in Busan", Gana Art Gallery, Busan
- 2012: "Famous Show", Gana Art Gallery, Seoul
- 2013: "The Premiere U.S. solo exhibition of Korean artist Mari Kim", Art Aqua Art Miami,
- 2013: "Famous Show in Hong Kong", LCX Hourbor city, Hong Kong
- 2014: "Synchronicity", Shine Artists Gallery, London, UK
- 2014: "Famous Show in Berlin", JR Gallery, Berlin, Germany
- 2014: "Famous Eyedoll", AP Contemporary Gallery, Hong Kong
- 2015: "Romance in the age of chaos", JR Gallery, Berlin, Germany
- 2015: "Forgotten Promises", Hakgojae Gallery, Shanghai, China
- 2016: "Synchronicity", Wynwood, Miami, US
- 2016: "Days of Future Past Exhibition", London, UK
- 2016: "Days of Future Past Exhibition", Los Angeles Art Show, Los Angeles, US
- 2016: "SETI", Hakgojae Gallery, Seoul.
- 2016: Synchronicity, Bundo Gallery / DeGu, KOREA . La vie Parisienne –x French Embassy, 0914 Gallery / Seoul, KOREA . SETI, Hakgoje Gallery / Seoul, KOREA . Days of Future Past / LA ART SHOW Featuring Solo show /LA, USA . Days of Future Past/ London, United Kingdom
- 2017: Days of Future Past / Pontone Gallery / Tai Ching, Taiwan
- 2018 Master piece - Immortal Love, LA art show special show case, USA
- Synchronicity – When people meet, JR gallery, Berlin, Germany
- 2019: Immortal Love, Pontone gallery, London/ UK
- 2020: Master Piece -Immortal Love, Gana art gallery, Seoul/ Korea
- 2021: Song for nobody, Gana art gallery Han Nam, Seoul/ Korea
- 2021: I too, didn’t like study, Seoul Auction gallery, Seoul/ Korea

== Selected group exhibitions ==
- 2006: "Pictoplasma Art Festival", Berlin, Germany
- 2008: "ART IDOL", Gallery Seo Ho, Seoul
- 2008: "Seoul Design Olympic Exhibition", Seoul
- 2008: Busan International Film Festival selection, Busan
- 2009: "Korean Neo Pop", Gangnam Media Pole, Seoul
- 2009: "Hello Funnism", Shin Han Gallery, Seoul
- 2009: "Beauty Rescues the World", Ssamzie Gallery, Seoul
- 2009: "Fun, K & Gallery", Seoul
- 2009: "Science Meets the Art", KAIST Gallery, Seoul
- 2009: "Korean Cartoon 100 years", National Museum of Modern and Contemporary Art, Seoul
- 2010: "IROBOT", Cho Sun Gallery, Seoul
- 2010: "Pop Party", Jangheung Art Park, Jangheung
- 2010: "Byul Collection Now", Gallery Hyundai K-Auction, Seoul
- 2010: "Decem Satisfaction", Gallery LEEBE, Busan
- 2010: "Korean Contemporary Art 3-Pop Art", Kimhae Art Centre, Kimhae
- 2010: "Korean 50 Contemporary Artists", Gyeonggi Arts Centre, Suwon
- 2010: "Wow~! Funny Pop", Gyeongnam Art Museum, Changwon
- 2010: "Korean Pop Art", Art Seasons Gallery, Singapore
- 2011: "Black & White", Opera Gallery, Seoul
- 2011: "Character Logue", Jangheung Art Park, Jangheung
- 2011: "Fun & Toy", Gana Art Gallery, Busan
- 2011: "Clio Box", Insa Art Center, Seoul
- 2011: "Imagination Virus", Jeonnam Art Museum, Gokseong
- 2011: "A Fantastic Place", Pyo Gallery South, Seoul
- 2012: "Festival O! Gwangju international Media Art 2012", Gwangju
- 2012: "Cartoon World", SOMA Museum of Art, Seoul
- 2012: "My Funny Valentine", KimReeA Gallery, Seoul
- 2012: "Dragon in your room", Atelier Aki, Seoul
- 2013: "K- Surrogates", Amalgamated Gallery, New York City, USA
- 2013: "Korean Collective", Shine Artists & Albemarle Gallery, London, UK
- 2013: "Sub Express 2013", Culture Station, Seoul
- 2013: "GANA 30TH ANNIVERSARY CELEBRATION EXHIBITION", Gana Art, Seoul
- 2015: "Autumn Contemporary Collection", Shine Artists, London, UK

=== Other projects ===
- 2007: Directed the short film "Religulous", selected in the Mains d'Oeuvres Festival, Saint-Ouen, France
- 2011: Produced and directed the music video for 2NE1's "Hate You"
- 2011: Art direction and cover artwork for 2NE1's second mini album

== Collections ==
- Seoul Museum of Art, Seoul
- Gyeongnam Art Museum, Changwon
- Korea Advanced Institute of Science and Technology, Daejeon

== Publications ==
- "EYEDOLL(아이돌) 마리킴의 기묘한 만화경" (2008), ISBN 9788995809457

== Awards ==
- 2013 Women of the Year Awards, sponsored by Ministry of Culture, Sports and Tourism, winner "ChungKang Culture Award", pop artist
