= I Am the Best =

2011 single by 2NE1

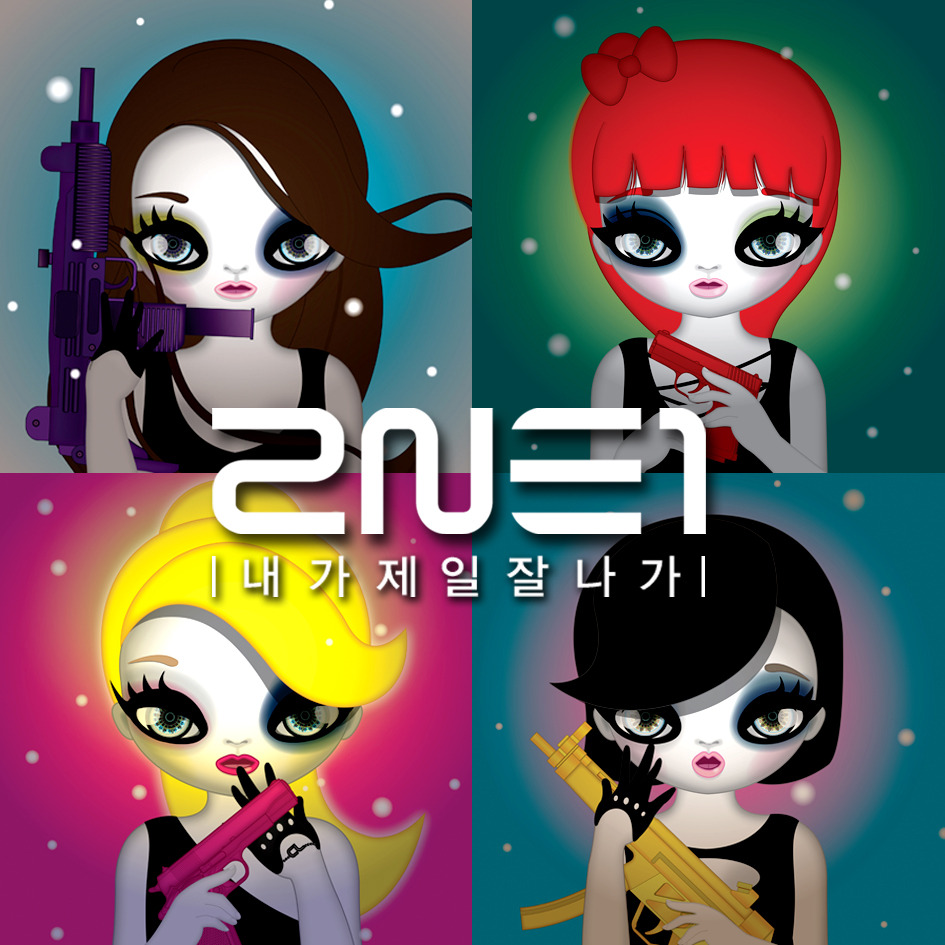
- South Korean digital cover

Single by 2NE1

from the EP 2NE1
- Released: June 24, 2011
- Genre: Electro house; electropop
- Length: 3:28
- Label: YG; Capitol
- Songwriter: Teddy Park
- Producer: Teddy Park

2NE1 singles chronology
"Lonely" (2011)	"I Am the Best" (2011)	"Hate You" (2011)

International digital cover

Music video
- "I Am the Best" on YouTube

"I Am the Best" (Korean: 내가 제일 잘 나가; RR: Naega jeil jal naga) is a song by South Korean girl group 2NE1. YG Entertainment released the song for digital download and streaming as the third single from the group's self-titled second extended play (EP) on June 24, 2011. Written and produced by Teddy Park, "I Am the Best" is an electro house and electropop track that integrates hip hop and Middle Eastern elements through its instrumentation. Its lyrics contain themes of self-confidence and narcissism.

Music journalists praised the production and 2NE1's performance and considered it a pioneer of the Korean wave and K-pop's "girl crush" concept, which denotes themes of ferocity and female empowerment. Many publications ranked it among the best K-pop songs of the decade and all time. It peaked at number one on the South Korean Gaon Digital Chart and was the fourth-best-selling single of 2011 in South Korea, with more than 3.4 million downloads sold. It won Song of the Year at the 2011 Mnet Asian Music Awards and Best Dance & Electronic Song at the 9th Korean Music Awards.

Seo Hyun-seung directed the music video for "I Am the Best", which features the members in glam punk fashion and won a MTV Video Music Award Japan for Best New Artist Video in 2012. The song received renewed attention after appearing in a 2014 commercial for Microsoft's Surface Pro 3; Capitol Records released it in the United States on December 10, 2014. The single peaked at number 61 on the French SNEP singles chart and made 2NE1 the first Korean group to have a number-one song on the Billboard US World Digital Songs chart.

== Background and composition ==
To promote girl group 2NE1's new extended play (EP), YG Entertainment released a single every three weeks starting from April 21, 2011, to promote all six tracks from the EP. "Don't Cry" (a solo single by group member Park Bom) and "Lonely" were the first two singles, and they both peaked at number one on the South Korean Gaon Digital Chart. YG released "I Am the Best" for digital download and streaming as the third single on June 24. In a press release, YG announced that it was an "intense" song combining electronic music and hip hop, which appealed to youths who were part of the clubbing culture.

YG Entertainment collaborator Teddy Park, who had produced most of 2NE1's past releases, wrote and produced "I Am the Best". Lee Kyung-joon engineered the track, which was mixed by Jason Robert. The Japanese-language version of the song was first made available for download via Recochoku on July 20, 2011, and was later included in the Japanese edition of the EP (Nolza) on September 21 as part of the group's debut in the country. Prior to the release of CL's first studio album Alpha in 2021, she held a live countdown event and played several snippets of unreleased versions of songs from both herself and 2NE1, and revealed that "I Am the Best" had originally featured Canadian singer Justin Bieber.

"I Am the Best" – 2NE1
A 21-second sample of "I Am the Best", featuring electronic and hip-hop elements, synthesizers and chanting

"I Am the Best" is three minutes and 28 seconds long. It incorporates a range of musical styles (electronic, electro house, hip-hop, African rhythms and reggae), synthesizers, Middle Eastern-inspired strings in the song's middle eight, and chants. Critics described the genre as electro house and electropop. Tim Chan from Rolling Stone noted the song's ability to bridge cultures and genres, "gloriously weav[ing] a Middle Eastern synth line in the middle of a glossy electro-pop track." Sociology professor John Lie highlighted the song as an example of the innovation of K-pop's formula, noting that it "subtly subverts the K-pop aesthetic and ethos" by incorporating a variety of different influences. The song is recognized as an empowerment anthem, with its lyrics centered around themes of self-confidence and narcissism.

== Critical response ==
Music critics applauded the musical styles of "I Am the Best" and 2NE1's performance. Discussing the rise of the Korean wave in November 2011, James Brooks of Pitchfork highlighted the song's "show-stopping" energy and 2NE1's "manic, larger-than-life charisma". In The New York Times, Jon Caramanica wrote that the song was "a postcard from the moment" when K-pop, which had been bound by the sound of other countries, "was beginning to embrace excess as its own style". Caramanica called 2NE1 a powerful influence in the industry, almost "ruthlessly modern", and believed that "'I Am the Best' encapsulated its "high-grade attitude". Slant Magazine featured it in their list of the 25 Best Singles of 2011; critic Jonathan Keefe described the track as "a jaw-dropping, vibrant triumph of pure swagger and verve" and cited it as an example of the "unmitigated joy of K-pop".

Korean Music Awards selection committee member Seo Jeong-min highlighted the song's "powerful, sensuous, and addictive electronic sound", and asserted that it firmly establishes itself as one of the representative tracks of K-pop. In Spin's June 2012 list of the 21 Greatest K-Pop Songs of All Time, "I Am the Best" ranked at number three, with Chuck Eddy writing that it "might've been the best single released on the planet in 2011". In October 2013, the Smithsonian Institution recognized "I Am the Best" as a key work in the spread of the Korean wave around the world with "Gangnam Style" by Psy, and "Fantastic Baby" by Big Bang, among others. In January 2017, Jeff Benjamin of Billboard picked the track as the number one single in the group's discography, writing that as "one of the most recognized K-pop songs in the world," the song speaks to 2NE1's legacy as a "bonafide, complete act", and commented that each member proves herself as an essential element of the "perfect-pop product" by turning into a superstar on her respective section.

"I Am the Best" on select critic rankings
Publication	Year	List	Rank	Ref.
Billboard	2019	The 100 Greatest K-pop Songs of the 2010s: Staff List	4	
British GQ	2019	Best K-pop songs of the decade	No order	
GQ	2019	The 24 Songs That Shaped the Decade	No order	
Melon	2021	Top 100 K-pop Songs of All Time	7	
Pitchfork	2018	The Story of Girl Groups in 45 Songs	No order	
Rolling Stone	2023	100 Greatest Songs in the History of Korean Pop Music	8	
Slant Magazine	2011	The 25 Best Singles of 2011	21	
Spin	2011	Spin's Favorite Pop Tracks of 2011	8	
Spin	2012	The 21 Greatest K-pop Songs of All Time	3	
Stereogum	2012	The 20 Best K-pop Videos	1	
Stereogum	2019	The 20 Best Music Videos of The 2010s	2	
The Dong-a Ilbo	2016	Best female idol songs according to experts	4	
Vice	2017	The 101 Best EDM Songs of All Time	101	

== Commercial performance ==
"I Am the Best" was a commercial success in South Korea, entering the Gaon Digital Chart at number four for the week ending June 25, 2011. In only one day of tracking, the song received 632,923 streams and achieved 414,580 units in digital sales, and was ranked as the week's sixth best-selling song. The following week, "I Am the Best" rose three positions to the number one spot on the chart, becoming the group's fourth number one single. The song sold an additional 735,518 digital units and received 2,181,326 streams, ranking at number one on both the component download and streaming charts. In its third charting week, the song descended eight positions down to number nine, with Infinite Challenge collaboration track "Having an Affair" by GG (Park Myung-soo & G-Dragon) and Bom occupying number one. By the end of 2011, the song had accumulated a total of 3.47 million units in digital sales, and ranked as the fourth best-selling single of the year in South Korea. Factoring in digital sales, streams and background music downloads, "I Am the Best" was ranked as the seventh best performing song in the country overall on the year-end Gaon Digital Chart for 2011, with the EP's other singles "Lonely" and "Don't Cry" ranking at number four and five, respectively.

Two years after its release, Billboard listed "I Am the Best" as the sixth best-selling K-pop song in the United States during 2013. The following year, Microsoft featured the track in their Surface Pro 3 laptop commercial "Head to Head", which was broadcast from August 2014 onwards. It further increased exposure to the song, which reached number one in the US on Billboard's World Digital Songs chart. It was the first K-pop song to achieve the feat, and the fourth Korean song to do so overall; the first three were Psy's singles, "Gangnam Style" (2012), "Gentleman" (2013) and "Hangover" (2014). It sold 6,000 copies during the week ending October 10, 2014, according to Nielsen SoundScan, becoming the group's best sales week in the US. As of 2020, the song held the distinction of being the fifth-longest-charting single on the World Digital Songs chart, tied with BTS' "Mic Drop" (2017). The song received airplay from radio stations in New York and Boston without officially being released to the airplay market, and attracted interest from some for being one of the few Korean-language songs to be played on American radios.

Elsewhere, in France, "I Am the Best" entered the SNEP singles chart at number 117 in the chart issue dated November 8, 2014. It rose to number 61 the following week where it peaked, and remained on the chart for four additional weeks. In Japan, the peaked at number 37 on the RIAJ Digital Track Chart and number 53 on the Billboard Japan Hot 100, and was certified gold by the Recording Industry Association of Japan (RIAJ) in December 2014 for digital sales of over 100,000 units.

== Music video ==
=== Background ===
A scene from the music video showing 2NE1's punk-inspired fashion and hairstyles

The first preview of the music video for "I Am the Best"—the song's first 10 seconds sung by group leader CL—was released on June 19, 2011. The preview was posted on YG Life and YouTube along with the song's cover art. YG Entertainment said that it would release an additional 10-second snippet of the track each day until the release date of the single on June 24. After a three-day delay due to an editing issue, the song's music video premiered on 2NE1's YouTube channel on June 27. It was directed by Seo Hyun-seung, who had previously directed the music videos for 2NE1's "Fire" (2009), "Try to Follow Me" (2010) and "Can't Nobody" (2010). The choreography practice video was uploaded to the group's channel on July 1 and featured the group in their practice studio wearing Adidas training outfits. A Japanese version of the music video was additionally uploaded later that month and was included in the DVD of Nolza in September.

The music video features a range of elaborate sets and props such as pyramids, diamonds, and globe-shaped chairs. The visual incorporates glam punk fashion and street style ensembles designed by Sophie Hulme, Gemma Slack, Cassette Playa and Gareth Pugh. It features CL dressed as a wrestler (complete with a sparkling WWE championship belt), and the members in futuristic and punk-inspired attire, metal-studded leather pieces, and unconventional hairstyles; for example, CL's resembles a bull's horn while Dara's resembles that of the Dragon Ball character Vegeta. They are seen ascending stairs during the third chorus while breaking platinum records with baseball bats, seemingly indicating the widening of boundaries of the genre. The final scene features the members with AK-47s, destroying a pyramid with a new structure emerging with "2NE1" reflecting in the light.

=== Reception ===
The music video attracted two million views in two days after its release. It was one of YouTube's top 10 trending videos in several territories worldwide, including France, Hong Kong, Sweden, Taiwan, and Mexico. The video garnered positive reviews from commentators; in March 2012, Tom Breihan of Stereogum ranked it number one on their list of 20 Best K-pop Videos, writing that "the song is ridiculously catchy and propulsive, and everything about the video – the editing, the choreography, the sheer volume of what-the-fuck imagery – works to support it", and opined "it's the greatest music video ever made". In Billboard's article "Top 5 Must-See Music Videos From the K-Pop Phenoms" marking the group's fifth anniversary, Jeff Benjamin commented that "throughout all the looks, styles and sound, none seem to define 2NE1 as much as 'I Am the Best.'" In 2019, Hyperallergic editor So Yun Um noted the video's use of "elegant minimalism to speak volumes," adding that the video's extensive wardrobe and "sparse, high-contrast black and white convey grandeur, class, and charisma — 2NE1’s indelible presence." The video exceeded 100 million total YouTube views on October 6, 2014, and made 2NE1 one of the few K-pop groups to have accomplished the feat.

== Accolades ==
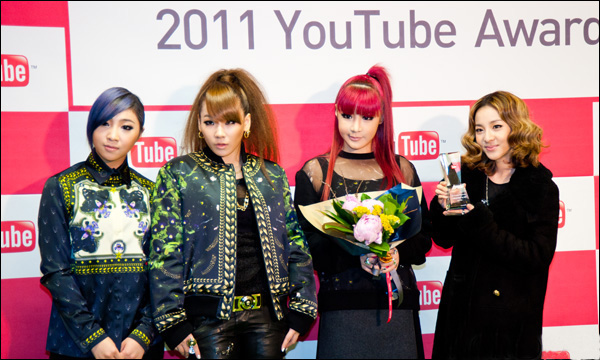
2NE1 at the YouTube K-pop Awards on November 22, 2011

On South Korean music programs, "I Am the Best" received first-place trophies on the July 17 broadcast of Inkigayo and on the August 5, 2011, broadcast of Music Bank. The song's success led it to be nominated for various awards at domestic award shows; at the 2011 Mnet Asian Music Awards held in Singapore, "I Am the Best" was named the Song of the Year and made 2NE1 the first group to win the award twice, following their win for "I Don't Care" in 2009. It also received nominations for Best Dance Performance – Female Group at the ceremony and Song of the Year at the 2011 Melon Music Awards. It was awarded at the YouTube K-pop Awards held at Google Korea for being one of the top three most popular music videos in South Korea during 2011.

At the 9th Korean Music Awards in February 2012, "I Am the Best" was nominated for Song of the Year and Best Dance & Electronic Song, winning the latter prize. It received the Best New Artist Video award at the 2012 MTV Video Music Awards Japan held in Chiba, winning against artists such as Kyary Pamyu Pamyu and LMFAO. It was also nominated for 50 Best Works of 2011 at the Space Shower Music Awards in Japan.

== Promotion and live performances ==
2NE1 premiered "I Am the Best" on television with their first performance on Inkigayo on June 26, 2011, following up with their first performance on Show! Music Core on July 2. After the release of the choreography practice video, the group announced a dance contest for the song on July 8, where 2NE1 and their choreographers would choose the four best submissions to win exclusive concert tickets for their upcoming Nolza tour in Seoul, Adidas Originals merchandise, and 2NE1 stage attire. The winner was L.Y.N.T., a female dance troupe from Vietnam. In August, 2NE1 embarked on their Nolza tour—the group's first headlining tour—and included the song in its set list. The group performed "Lonely" and "I Am the Best" at the 2011 Mnet Asian Music Awards in Singapore on November 29, 2011, where they sported black outfits with gold and silver ornaments. Their stage received the ceremony's highest viewership levels, garnering an audience rating of 5.56 percent. The following month, they reprised the song at the MTV Iggy Best New Band in the World Concert at Times Square's Best Buy Theater and at the 2011 SBS Gayo Daejeon.

On June 23, 2012, 2NE1 performed the song along with "Scream" at the 2012 MTV Video Music Awards Japan. During the concerts of their New Evolution Global Tour, which they embarked on the following month, "I Am the Best" was used as the opening number. The group made a performance with the song at the K-Pop Collection in Okinawa on October 18, and at the SBS K-Pop Super Concert in California on November 10. For their 2014 All or Nothing World Tour, the group sang the track while sitting astride motorbikes.

Following a year's hiatus on December 2, 2015, 2NE1 gave a surprise performance at the 2015 Mnet Asian Music Awards in Hong Kong. After CL's solo performance, the rest of the group unexpectedly appeared and reunited to perform "Fire" and "I Am the Best". Fuse TV named the reunion as one of the best performances of the year, and was only one of the two non-Western acts to have been mentioned by the media outlet. On February 25, 2018, CL co-headlined the 2018 Winter Olympics closing ceremony with Exo and performed parts of the song. At the games, figure skaters Kim Kyu-eun and Alex Kam featured the track in their routine for the figure skating exhibition gala. In July of that year, the Olympic's YouTube channel ranked CL's performance the eighth-best Olympic live music performance of all time.

On April 16, 2022, 2NE1 reunited to perform the song as a surprise performance during 88rising's Head in the Clouds showcase at the 2022 Coachella Festival in Indio, California, marking the group's first performance in over six years since the 2015 Mnet Asian Music Awards.

== Usage in media ==
"I Am the Best" has appeared in various television series in South Korea and abroad, including in the first episode of the 2018 drama series Something in the Rain (when Jung Hae-in's character watches Son Ye-jin casually dancing to the song). It was featured in season 10 of the American reality series So You Think You Can Dance, when Jenna Johnson dances with Mark Kanemura in a routine choreographed by Kanemura. In March 2017, the song was used in The Magicians episode "Plan B", where one of the magicians (played by Hale Appleman) set off one of his magical objects to induce his targets into a dance trance. In 2019, it was heard in episode 5 of the drama Welcome 2 Life (with Rain's character referencing the song's title) and in the South Park episode "Board Girls". The following year, it was used in the drama series Mr. Queen and in a dance performance of the Netflix original film Work It.

About choosing "I Am the Best" for its "Head to Head" Surface Pro 3 commercial, Microsoft said that the song's "confident lyrics and lively beats made a good fit with the new product's image". A follow-up commercial, "Accolades", was later released and was broadcast during the 57th Annual Grammy Awards, resulting in the song regaining the top spot on the World Digital Songs chart. In 2018, it was chosen for an advertisement campaign for the 2019 Kia Forte car by Kia Canada. It was included in the Xbox 360 Kinect game Dance Central 3 (2012), the video-game series' first K-pop song, and was added to the soundtrack of Ubisoft's game Just Dance 2020.

== Legacy ==
Critics have recognized "I Am the Best" as a symbol of the "girl crush" image in K-pop as well as one of the works that helped increase K-pop's global exposure. Writing for Billboard, Caitlin Kelley defined "girl crush" as "anything that conveys the image of ferocity, stepping outside the expectations of hyperfemininity", but also amounting to "more abstract ideas of relatability, aspiration and female empowerment." She noted 2NE1 as one of the groups which largely developed the image in the genre, and referred to "I Am the Best" as "one of the most iconic girl crush concepts on many levels." In 2018, Pitchfork included the song in their article of 45 highlights in girl group history. The following year, British GQ called it the highlight of 2011 and a game-changer in a decade of K-pop, acknowledging 2NE1 for bringing the genre to the "curious attention of the Western fashion and music media", and regarded "I Am the Best" as the "visual blueprint" for the genre's "feisty" girl crush concept. Billboard ranked the song number four on their "100 Greatest K-pop Songs of the 2010s" list, calling the song "undeniably iconic" and the "track that bulldozed into our lives and pulled so many of us into the wondrous world of Korean pop". In 2020, the lyrics of "I Am the Best" were featured in an exhibition titled "Korean Pop Lyrics: Melodies of Life" at the National Hangeul Museum in Seoul.

Regarding the song's international exposure, Jeff Benjamin of Billboard wrote that "K-pop has much of its overseas travel to thank for this absolute monster of a pop smash." GQ named it one of 24 songs that shaped the decade while Stereogum named its video the second best music video of the 2010s, the only non-Western work to be mentioned in both lists. In 2021, Billboard editor Nolan Feeney wrote that "I Am the Best" "lives up to its name a decade later", and considered it to have helped pave the way for K-pop's takeover in America. In a ranking conducted by a panel of 35 music and industry experts curated by Melon and Seoul Shinmun from August of that year, it was listed as the seventh best Korean idol song of all time, with critic Kim Young-dae writing that it presented a "completely new attitude and possibility" to the music of K-pop girl groups. He added that the 10-second opening sung by CL "will be remembered as a critical moment in K-pop history", along with the intro to "Gangnam Style" released the following year. Rolling Stone ranked it the eighth greatest song in the history of Korean pop music in 2023, stating that "2NE1 established a new industry standard".

== Credits ==
Credits adapted from Tidal.

- 2NE1 – vocals
- Teddy Park – lyricist, composer, producer
- Lee Kyung-joon – engineer
- Jason Robert – mixer

== Charts ==
=== Weekly charts ===
Weekly chart performance for "I Am the Best"
Chart (2011–2013)	Peak position
Japan Hot 100 (Billboard)	53
Japan Adult Contemporary (Billboard)	32
South Korea (Gaon)	1
South Korea (K-pop Hot 100)	12
US World Digital Songs (Billboard)	4

Weekly chart performance for "I Am the Best"
Chart (2014)	Peak position
France (SNEP)	61
UK Independent Singles (OCC)	44
US World Digital Songs (Billboard)	1

=== Year-end charts ===
2011 year-end chart position for "I Am the Best"
Chart (2011)	Position
South Korea (Gaon)	7
US World Digital Songs (Billboard)	24
Chart (2012)	Position
US World Digital Songs (Billboard)	14
Chart (2013)	Position
US World Digital Songs (Billboard)	16
Chart (2014)	Position
US World Digital Songs (Billboard)	14
Chart (2015)	Position
US World Digital Songs (Billboard)	4

== Sales and certifications ==
Sales and certifications for "I Am the Best"
Region	Certification	Certified units/sales
Japan (RIAJ) Japanese ver.	Gold	100,000^{*}
South Korea (Gaon)	—	3,470,000
United States	—	12,000
^{*} Sales figures based on certification alone.

== Release history ==
Release dates and formats for "I Am the Best"
Region	Date	Format	Label(s)	Ref.
Various	June 24, 2011	Digital download; streaming	YG Entertainment	
United States	December 10, 2014	Digital download; streaming	Capitol Records	

== See also ==
- List of best-selling singles in South Korea
- List of Gaon Digital Chart number ones of 2011
