= Sarah Linda =

British actress and model (born 1987)

- Born: Sarah Michelle Linda; 13 November 1987 (age 37); Salisbury, Wiltshire, England, UK
- Occupation: Actress
- Years active: 2006–present

Sarah Michelle Linda (born 13 November 1987) is a British actress and model, known for her work in television, film and commercials. She had a minor role in the 2011 film adaptation of Tinker Tailor Soldier Spy as well as major roles in the independent films D.One and Sparrow. She also appeared in the films 4.3.2.1 and The Boat That Rocked, as well as an appearance as a bar girl in an episode of the mini-series Demons.

As a model, Linda became the face of Sophie Hulme's A/W collection at London Fashion Week. She has also been the face and voice of numerous advertising campaigns, including Saga Insurance, T-Mobile and Laguna Beach. Recently, Linda appeared alongside Adam Berry in the independently financed short film Losing It, which she also produced.
