= Wojciech Stuchlik =

Polish tennis player and film producer

- Born: Wojciech Stuchlik; November 12, 1984 (age 41); Silesia, Poland
- Occupations: Tennis player, film producer
- Years active: 2007–Present

Wojciech Stuchlik (born November 12, 1984) is a Polish tennis player and film producer.

== Career ==
=== Athletics ===
Stuchlik started playing tennis in his native Poland from a young age, but eventually moved to the US, where he studied the sport at Queen's College. He took part in the USTA 2007 National Championships and won the Men's Doubles alongside Queens College Coach Craig Schwartz. In April of the same year, Stuchlik earned his second ECC Men's Tennis Player of the Year Award. In May, he took part in the National Collegiate Athletic Association's East Regional at Kutztown University of Pennsylvania, and won alongside his double's partner, William Almeyda.

=== Film ===
In 2009, Stuchlik was attached as a second executive producer of Polish-language film Another Man by Philip Zaluska. Later that year, Stuchlik acquired the first filming rights to the existing English-language script 'Camp Nightmare', and worked with British director Shaun Troke to turn it into the horror film Sparrow.
