= Holly Kenyon =

English actress

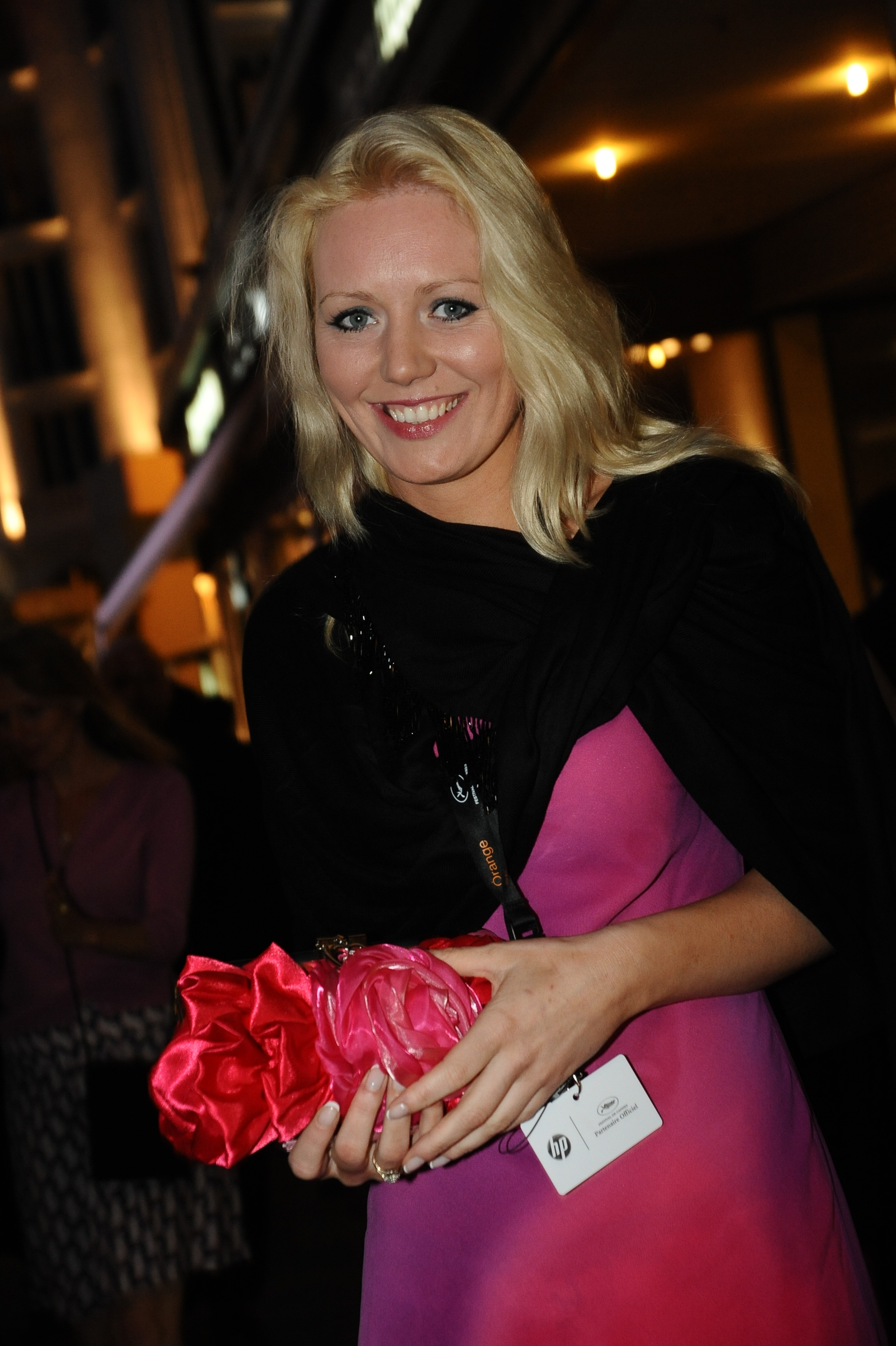
- Holly Kenyon attending the 63rd Cannes Film Festival
- Born: Holly Jane Kenyon; 21 November 1980 (age 45); Nottingham, Nottinghamshire, England, United Kingdom
- Occupation: Actress
- Years active: 2009–present
- Children: 2

Holly Jane Kenyon (born 21 November 1980) is an English actress who won a scholarship to study at The American Musical and Dramatic Academy in central Hollywood. She appeared in The Kindness of Strangers (2010) and was invited to attend the film's screening at the 63rd Cannes Film Festival.

== Early life ==
Holly Kenyon was born in Nottingham, Nottinghamshire, the only daughter of Jane Alison Kenyon. Both her maternal grandmother and grandfather were from Scottish families. She attended Trent College in Derbyshire before moving to Wales when she was 18 years old. Kenyon studied at university in Wales However she soon returned to her performing roots and auditioned for the American Musical and Dramatic Academy. She was immediately offered a scholarship and moved to Los Angeles to take up her place at the drama school.

== Career ==
Holly Kenyon began her career as a singer and was classically trained from the age of twelve. as well as playing the flute and 'cello. It had originally been her desire to pursue a career in musical theatre and she went on to work briefly in opera and pantomime and studied at the London College of Music. However, after studying acting at drama school in Hollywood, she decided to focus upon straight acting roles, once back in the UK. Shortly after returning from drama school, she won a place on an acting workshop that was held in Cardiff where she was spotted by a personnel management agent who offered to represent her. Soon after signing to her personal management agency, Kenyon was offered a supporting role in the British feature film The Kindness of Strangers. She played the role of a French bar waitress called Beatrice in the film. This film was screened at the 63rd Cannes Film Festival. The film starred David Prowse who played the role Darth Vader in the original Star Wars movies. In August 2010 it was announced that The Kindness of Strangers had earned six nominations at the International Filmmaker Festival of World Cinema including the nomination for Best Film of the Festival and a nomination for Best Director. The film eventually won four of the awards including Best Director for Hadfield. Prior to this film role, Kenyon also played a Russian girl in Perfidy, a role which required her to speak Russian. In 2011 Holly was cast as news reporter Celyn Bowen in the paranormal horror film Untitled.

Kenyon shot a sci-fi film in Birmingham. She played the lead role of Scarlet Davies in the futuristic sci-fi action film.

== Filmography ==
Year	Film	Role	Notes
2009	Perfidy	Irina	
2010	The Kindness of Strangers	Beatrice	
2011	Untitled	Celyn Bowen	
2011	Objective Perfection	Marie-Claire	
2011	No Man is an Island	Grace Summers	
2011	Cuckoo	Corporal Molly Taylor	
2011	Shriek	Karen	
2012	Director's Cut	Amber	
2012	Passing of the Bridle	Victoria Brown	
2013	Dark Country	Sara	
2013	The Eleventh Hour	Synthia	
2016	Enter The Cage	Evelyn Hamilton	
2016	Mansion of Mystery: Espionage	Dr Arabella Dangerfield	
2016	Celestial Sisters	Scarlet Davies	
TBC	A Pirate's Life For Me	Captain Polly Peacock	
