= The Taiwan Oyster =

- Theatrical poster
- Directed by: Mark Jarrett
- Written by: Mark Jarrett; Jordan Heimer; Mitchell Jarrett
- Produced by: Evan Fleischer; Mark Jarrett; Mitchell Jarrett; Paul Knaus; Pin-Chun Liu; Anish Savjani; Puck Tsai
- Starring: Billy Harvey; Leonora Moore; Jeff Palmiotti; Erin King
- Cinematography: Mike Simpson
- Edited by: Ron Dulin
- Music by: Dylan Jones
- Production companies: Spoonbill Pictures; Filmscience; Citizen Tofu
- Distributed by: SnagFilms
- Release date: March 1, 2012 (SXSW Festival)
- Running time: 105 minutes
- Countries: United States; Taiwan
- Language: English

The Taiwan Oyster is a 2013 American low budget adventure comedy-drama Indie film directed by Mark Jarrett. The film marks Jarrett's feature film debut, and was based upon his own experiences living in Taiwan and working as kindergarten teachers from 1999 to 2001. The events in the movie take place when a fellow ex-pat dies. Described as a Texas road film in a Taiwan setting, the project stars Billy Harvey, Leonora Moore, and Jeff Palmiotti.

== Plot ==
Simon (Billy Harvey) and Darin (Jeff Palmiotti) are two laid-back American ex-patriates who teach kindergarten and run a magazine called The Oyster in Taiwan in 2000. When fellow ex-pat (Will Mounger) dies an unfortunate death, they learn that there is no one to contact his Stateside family and no one to claim his body. They decide to make it their mission to ensure he receives a proper burial rather than allow his being cremated by the local authorities. Unfortunately, the morgue overseer demands a bribe in order to release the body.

Nikita (Leonora Moore), a sympathetic clerk, helps them steal Jed's body and joins them on their road trip across Taiwan looking for the ideal burial site. Their efforts are complicated by having to keep Jed's body on ice in the bed of their pickup truck while transporting it all over Taiwan.

== Cast ==
- Billy Harvey as Simon
- Leonora Moore as Nikita (as Leonora Lim)
- Jeff Palmiotti as Darin
- Erin King as Mike Fink
- Fu-Kuei Huang as Mr. Chen
- Chia-Ying Kuo as Mrs. Chen
- Joseph Shu as Moulder
- Sean Scanlan as Barrie the Bull
- Will Mounger as Jedidiah Jonas Williams
- Jimi Moe as Paul
- Hai-sen Ni as Jerry the Teacher
- Eva Liao as Jane
- Catherine Li as Jane's Mom
- Michael Jian as Tony
- Magnus von Platen as Guy in park
- Dean Sung as Morgue Overseer
- Che-lun Ou as Fighting Couple
- Bob Bloodworth as DJ Falstaff
- Bin-he Feng as Morgue Clerk
- Zi-Ning Chou as Darin's Lady Friend 1
- Klairinette Wu as Darin's Lady Friend 2
- Wei-Jyun Tao as Security Guard
- Jore Liu as Teashop Waitress

== Production ==
Mark Jarrett had lived in Taichung, Taiwan, from 1999 to 2001, and set his story to take place six months after the region's September 21, 1999 921 earthquake. Jarrett's original idea was to think of a low-budget road movie. He had been reading William Faulkner's As I Lay Dying and decided that his story could take place in Taiwan. Based upon the director's own experiences, the screenplay was written by director Jarrett, his brother Mitchell Jarrett, and by Jordan Heimer, and was shot at locations across Taiwan using 5D and 7D equipment. The film's title refers to the magazine published by the lead protagonists, which is itself modeled after one at which Jarrett himself worked. The Jarrett bros. returned to Taiwan in 2009 to scout locations. and filming was done through "repeated acts of low-budget, guerrilla filmmaking." Funding was chiefly acquired through Spoonbill Pictures, LLC with a large help from two Kickstarter fundraisers.

== Release ==
Slated for theatrical release in October 2013, the film had its world premiere at the South by Southwest Film Festival on March 10, 2012. It had its Taiwan premiere April 2012, at the Urban Nomad Film Festival.

== Reception ==
Variety stated that director Mark Jarrett understands that a road film should enlighten as well as entertain, and that his film did so "with great originality." In referring to the opening showing the leads drinking heavily with a group of other ex-pats, they wrote "the film packs more soul than the hedonism of its early scenes suggests". They spoke toward the scenes where Simon, Darin, and Nikita steal Jed's body from the morgue, and offered that it was "one of the strangest and most invigorating heists in ages, a cross between an old Laurel and Hardy routine and the scrappy anarchy of early Wes Anderson." They praised the cinematographer's camerawork, writing "the sheer beauty of [Mike] Simpson's frames often stands in direct contrast with the delirious indulgence on display," They offered that while the film may get more play through festival screenings than theatrical release, it was a "striking feature". KUT radio called The Taiwan Oyster a "'Texas road trip' film set in Taiwan to a soundtrack of Bobby Bare, the Flatlanders and Bobbie Gentry" which, even while taking place in the “Wild, Wild East” of Taiwan, has "a certain Texas sensibility to it".

Film Business Asia compared the film to others that had been filmed along Taiwan's scenic East Coast Highway, but noted that the film was "basically a US indie that just happens to be set in East Asia", and that rather than being an integral part of the film, "the landscape and locals are there for decoration." They offered though, that despite a lack of engagement with the local culture, the film did "convey a genuine sense of place from an outsider's perspective," and that the film had good production values, and well-composed cinematography and performances. Taipei Times both interviewed Mark Jarrett and made note of the time he had spent in Taiwan, writing that the film is "a captivating and visually stunning indie film that ponders the idea of death". Twitch Film wrote that while "performance are all over the map", the onscreen chemistry between Billy Harvey and Leonora Moore "is at times breathtaking". They expanded that much of the film "is playful (and at times hilarious)," but that "the beautiful photography often makes for a melancholy backdrop, as the stunning countryside constantly reminds us that these characters are strangers in a strange land, made all the more small by the ancient otherworldliness that surrounds them on all sides." They summarized that the film was "at times heavy-handed", but that the film "moves deftly between the realms of comedy and tragedy," and that the characters "are at once likeable, and perhaps in the case of many suffering from a bit of the quarter-life crisis, even a bit familiar."

Don Clinchy of the Slackerwood website wrote that the film was "an intriguing, lyrical and visually poetic film that explores the meaning of mortality," calling it "a deeply existential film with dark humor and darker implications." He made special note of superb work by cinematographer Mike Sampson, and how the work "perfectly captured" the "contrasts between the rural tranquility and urban activity." He did have minor issues with some of the dialogue being "slightly unnatural" for a film with "an otherwise authentic vibe". He also felt that the film's romance seemed "contrived and inconsequential" when compared to the film's "more substantial themes of existential angst." He also found minor fault with the Nikita character agreeing so readily to take such a trip with two complete strangers, feeling that she seemed "too sensible", and her character needed "more development and backstory" to have her actions make better sense. Other than those criticisms, he found the story "solid and thought-provoking," and performances by the film's three leads to be solid. He offered that Billy Harvey's Simon was best, and that Leonora Moore did "a great job as Nikita, a smart, savvy woman who is a sober, grounding influence on her intemperate traveling companions." He offered that while first-time actor Jeff Palmiotti was occasionally "hammy", his performance was "totally believable". He concluded that the film was "a gorgeous and captivating film, a physical and spiritual journey in an exotic land. It has much to say about life, loneliness and death, and our eternal struggles with all three."
