= Reginald Philip Abigail =

Reginald Philip Abigail (1892–1969), often referred to as R. P. Abigail, was a senior British officer in the Indian Civil Service in Burma, District Commissioner of Arakan during the early stages of the fall of Burma in 1942 and, at the start of his civil service career, an author and surveyor on the townships and settlements of Burma. When the Japanese bombing raids on Akyab in Arakan began in earnest in March 1942, Abigail drew criticism for leaving his post and departing Burma on board HMIS Indus bound for Calcutta.

== Life ==
Reginald Philip Abigail was born in India on 11 August 1892, the son of Reverend W. J. Abigail. He was educated at Trent College and Bedford Modern School. At the outbreak of World War I, Abigail enlisted in the Canadian Expeditionary Force before transferring to the Indian Army with the 2/7th Gurkhas, a regiment he left as a Captain in 1923.

On 29 October 1923, Abigail joined the Indian Civil Service through open competition. Following in the same vein as some of the work he conducted as a Gurkha, Abigail initially worked as an author and surveyor on the townships and settlements of Burma. He remained in Burma for most of his career and was later appointed Assistant Commissioner, Officiating Undersecretary to the Government in 1925 and a Deputy Commissioner in 1931 and 1940.

Abigail was Commissioner of Arakan during the early stages of the fall of Burma in 1942. When the Japanese bombing raids on Akyab began in earnest, Abigail left his post on 30 March 1942 and departed from Burma to Calcutta on board HMIS Indus, a decision that has been described by some historians as controversial particularly as his departure was a month prior to the physical invasion by the Japanese and his ship allegedly failed to return to collect other residents in Arakan. However, HMIS Indus is known to have returned to Akyab but was attacked and sunk by the Japanese on 6 April 1942.

After the fall of Burma, Abigail worked in the Ministry of Supply in New Zealand. He retired from the Civil Service in 1945 and died in London in 1969.

== Selected bibliography ==
- Report on the Third Settlement of the Pa-an and Hlaingbwe Townships together with the First Settlement of Newly Surveyed Areas in the above Townships of the Thaton District, Season 1928–30. By R.P. Abigail (with maps). Published Rangoon, 1931
- Report on the Summary Settlement Operations of the Gangaw, Tilin and Saw Townships, Pakôkku District, December 1930 – May 1931. By R.P. Abigail (with maps). Published, Rangoon, 1934
