= Anthony Eyton =

British artist (born 1923)

Anthony Eyton OBE RA RWA RWS
- Born: Anthony John Plowden Eyton; 17 May 1923 (age 103); Teddington, Middlesex, England
- Education: Reading University (1941), James Anthony Betts; Camberwell School of Arts (1947–50)
- Awards: Charles Wollaston Award (1989)
- Elected: London Group (1958); ARA (1976), RA (1986); RWA (1984); ARWS (1985), RWS (1988); RCamA (1993); HonPS; HonROI

Anthony John Plowden Eyton OBE RA RWA RWS (born 17 May 1923) is a British artist and member of the Royal Academy of Arts.

Eyton turned 100 on 17 May 2023.

== Early life and education ==
Eyton was born in Teddington, Middlesex, and studied fine art at University of Reading under James Anthony Betts before leaving for the Army during the Second World War (1942–1947). After demobilisation, he immediately resumed his studies, this time at Camberwell School of Arts until 1950. In 1951, he travelled to Italy after winning an Abbey Major Scholarship to British School at Rome.

== Art practice ==
Eyton is a figurative painter working in what could be termed the post-Impressionist tradition. He has exhibited extensively throughout Britain at leading galleries such as the Royal Academy, the Tate Gallery, the South London Gallery, the Hayward Gallery and the Imperial War Museum. He has won many awards, including the John Moores Prize in 1972. He was elected an Associate Royal Academician (A.R.A) in 1976, a full member in 1986 and a Senior R.A. in 1998. Among his many significant commissions was the 1994 invitation by the Tate Gallery to work in the Bankside Power Station prior to it becoming Tate Modern. Based in London, he has continued to work and exhibit into his eighties and beyond. Examples of Eyton's painting are held in major public and private collections throughout the world.

Eyton was appointed Officer of the Order of the British Empire (OBE) in the 2023 Birthday Honours for services to painting and the art community.

== Teaching ==
Eyton began teaching at Camberwell in 1955 and continued there as a part-time tutor until the 1980s. He was Head of Painting at St. Lawrence College, Kingston, Ontario in 1969 and taught at the Royal Academy Schools from 1964 to 1999.

== Publications ==
Anthony Eyton - Studio pictures (2017) Miriquidi Books ISBN 978-0-9934111-4-4
