= James Anthony Betts =

British artist and professor

- Born: 1897; Skipton, Yorkshire, England, UK
- Died: 1980 (aged 82–83)
- Education: Bradford College; Royal College of Art
- Spouse: Nellie Flexen (m. 1925)

James Anthony Betts (1897–1980) was a British artist and arts professor.

== Early life ==
Betts was born in Skipton, North Riding of Yorkshire. He began his education at the parish school of St Stephen's Church, Skipton a Catholic congregation.

As an adult, Betts was employed by Midland Railway where he worked as a clerk. At night, however, he attended art classes led by Nellie Serena Flexen, a 1917 graduate of the Royal College of Art. With Flexen's encouragement, Betts sought further training at Bradford College. From Bradford, Betts was accepted at the Royal College of Art where he came under the influence and instruction of Paul Nash. While there, he developed friendships with fellow students Eric Ravilious, Edward Bawden, and Helen Binyon.

== Academic career ==
In 1925, Betts married Nellie Flexen and the following year took a teaching position at Sheffield College, eventually becoming head of the painting department at the school. In 1930, he moved on to become principal of Kingston School of Art.

In 1934, Betts was hired as a professor of art at the University of Reading. He was elected to membership in the Royal Society of Arts the following year. Not long after that, he became head of Reading's fine arts department, a position he held until 1963 when he retired.

During his lifetime, exhibitions of Betts' work were held in London, Paris, and New York. One of his works is held by the British Museum. His remaining paintings are held by private collectors and in the University of Reading Art Collection.

== Notable students ==
- Anthony Eyton
- George Fisher Gilmour
- Kenneth Steel
