= Sparrow (2010 film) =

- Theatrical Release Poster
- Directed by: Shaun Troke
- Written by: Matthew Mosley; Justin Di Febo
- Produced by: Wojciech Stuchlik
- Starring: Faye Sewell; Thomas James Longley; Alexis Jayne Defoe; Eric Kolelas
- Cinematography: Jakub Jakielaszek
- Edited by: Pawel Slawek
- Music by: Jakub Gawlina
- Production company: Wojciech Stuchlik Independent Film Production
- Release date: 23 October 2010 (London premiere)
- Running time: 72 minutes
- Countries: Poland; United Kingdom
- Language: English
- Budget: £10,000

Sparrow or Wróbel is a 2010 Polish-British slasher horror film, directed by Shaun Troke, written by Matthew Mosley and Justin Di Febo, and produced by independent filmmaker Wojciech Stuchlik. The film stars Jack W. Carter, Alexis Jayne Defoe, Eric Kolelas, Sarah Linda, Thomas James Longley and Faye Sewell.

Sparrow was shot in Poland on a budget of just £10,000, with a primarily British cast. The film premiered in October 2010, and was shown at the American Film Market in November 2011. Sparrow was released on DVD in the U.S in 2013.

== Plot ==
Six teenage friends, set off on a camping trip in the forest. However ‘Camp Happy Dreams’ turns out to be ‘Camp Nightmare’, as legend states it’s the site of a presumed historic murder. The teenagers' disbelief in this urban legend is soon changed when strange happenings begin to occur to each of them.

== Cast ==
- Faye Sewell as Cindy
- Thomas James Longley as Matt
- Alexis Jayne Defoe as Dawn
- Eric Kolelas as Duncan
- Sarah Linda as Kirsty
- Jack W. Carter as Sitcom
- Jordan Greenhough as Alex
- Nikki Harrup as Tina
- Joseph Stacey as Tim
- Leonora Moore as Pam
- Jennifer Karen as Heather
- Ali Keane as Jeff
- Marian Folga as Sparrow
- Monica Folga as Fiancée
- Peter Saklak as Lover

== Production ==
Originally titled Camp Nightmare, the story was written by underground screenwriters Matthew Mosley and Justin Di Febo. The story is based around six teenage friends who set off on a camping trip in a forest presumed to be the site of a historic murder.

Casting occurred in the United Kingdom in March 2010. The role of the serial killer 'Sparrow', was originally to be played by an English actor, but when he was forced to return to England, director Shaun Troke cast Marian Folga, a local artist from Jaworzno, in the role.

Principal filming began in the Hamerla area near Lędziny, Poland in June, supported by a mainly Polish crew, and was completed 23 July, with post-production being completed in late September.

On 22 July 2010, an initial teaser trailer was made public. Early versions of Sparrow received official screenings on and around Halloween 2010 in Vermont, Poland and South Africa. A British premiere in London is now set for early 2012.

== Reception ==
Critical response to Sparrow was generally positive. Screen Jabber awarded the film 3 out of a possible 5 stars.
