= George Fisher Gilmour =

British artist

- Born: 12 April 1904
- Died: 1984 (aged 79–80); Kingston upon Thames, England
- Education: Kingston School of Art
- Known for: Genre painting
- Style: Oil and watercolour

George Fisher Gilmour (1904-1984) was a British artist, playwright, and filmmaker. As a genre painter, he worked primarily in oil and watercolor.

== Biography ==
George Fisher Gilmour was born on 12 April 1904 in Kingston upon Thames to George Stratern Neilson Gilmour, a merchant mariner, and Catherine Darlington Fisher. His father's family migrated from Scotland to Liverpool where they became crewmen on merchant ships. His mother came from a family of lawyers and bankers. Gilmour's parents were married at St. Oswald Church in Chester, Cheshire on 3 August 1903.

Gilmour was baptized at St. Luke's Church, Kingston. He spent his first years in Kingston upon Thames. The family moved to Gravesend in 1911. There the Gilmour family acquired two boarders, Jane Gleeson and her son, Denis.

George, Catherine, Jane, and Denis moved back to Kingston shortly after World War I began. Gilmour's father, having sailed between the UK and the US, had become enamored with life in New York and applied for US citizenship. Although his parents never divorced, his father disappeared from their daily lives, residing without them in New York until he died in 1940. Jane and Denis remained part of the family.

Gilmour's mother died in November 1947. She was buried in a common grave at Kingston Cemetery. Jane Gleeson died in 1963. Gilmour and Denis Gleeson continued to live together until Gleeson died in 1968. Gilmour died on 12 April 1984. His remains were buried above his mother's.

== Personal life ==
Gilmour was privately educated before attending the Kingston School of Art. He received instruction under the guidance of James Anthony Betts, completing his education around 1934. He worked through a studio in London while working part-time as an attendant at a car park. As World War II appeared inevitable and had already produced changes in British society, many were interested in preserving memories of the past before they disappeared. Artists were encouraged to create works to that end. Most of Gilmour's paintings from this period depict scenes from daily life in and around Kingston.

When World War II began, Gilmour volunteered as a fireman in the Auxiliary Fire Service and served with a fire brigade at Battersea until the end of the war. Following World War II, Gilmour became a civil servant. He continued to paint and exhibit broadly. He retired from public service in 1970. He trained his artistic technique in Italy and expanded his repertoire, writing plays and producing cine films. At least two of his plays were performed in amateur theatres. Two of his films - The Kepi and The Evening Student - were produced and distributed on a limited basis.

== Career and exhibitions ==
Gilmour's earliest works were his most critical successes. As a member of the Auxiliary Fire Service, Gilmour joined a group of artisans dubbed the Firemen Artists. With the help of the War Artists' Advisory Committee, the Firemen Artists exhibited throughout the UK and in special exhibitions in the US. In this regard, Gilmour's works were shown with the Royal Society of British Artists, the New English Art Club, the Royal Academy of Arts, and similar institutions.

After World War II, Gilmour continued to exhibit widely, including at events held by major UK arts organizations. While he never gained membership to a UK arts organization, he became a foreign member of the Society of French Artists, exhibiting each year at their annual event in Paris from 1950 through 1980.
