= Thomas James Longley =

English actor and model

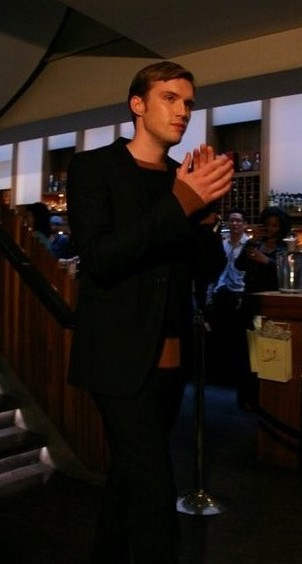
- Longley in 2011
- Born: 22 April 1989 (age 37); Canterbury, Kent, England
- Occupations: Actor, model
- Years active: 2004–present

Thomas James Longley (born 22 April 1989) is an English actor and model.

== Career ==
In 2004, Longley achieved acclaim from The Times for his performance as Gabriel in a widely publicised revival of The Mystery Plays at Canterbury Cathedral. He has since appeared in the indie films Sparrow (2010), Day and Night (2012), and Island (2013). In 2011, he briefly modelled for Reiss. On 22 August 2018 he released a single, "She's Dynamite".
