= Trent College =

Public school in Derbyshire, England

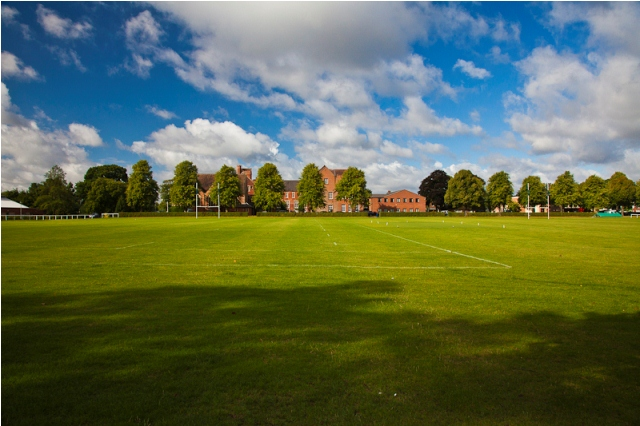
- View of the school from its main sports field

Location
- Long Eaton, Derbyshire, NG10 4AD; England; 52°53′59″N 1°17′04″W

Information
- Type: Public School; Independent; Day and boarding
- Religious affiliation: Church of England
- Established: 1868
- Founder: Francis Wright
- Local authority: Derbyshire
- Department for Education URN: 113004 Tables
- President: 12th Duke of Devonshire
- Chair of Governors: Deborah Evans
- Head: Leo Dudin
- Gender: Co-educational
- Age: 11 to 18
- Enrolment: 1000 plus
- Houses: 5
- Colours: Navy, Red and Gold
- Publication: The Trident
- Former pupils: Old Tridents
- Preparatory school: The Elms School
- Website: http://www.trentschools.net

Trent College is a co-educational private boarding and day school located in Long Eaton, Derbyshire, between Nottingham and Derby. Founded in 1868 as a local 'middle class alternative' to the more famous public schools, it is now a coeducational school and a member of the Headmasters' and Headmistresses' Conference.

It has over 1,000 pupils, including 760 pupils in the Senior School and 330 pupils in the Junior School (The Elms School).

On 5 December 2025, the governors announced that Dr. Leo Dudin would be taking over as Head from September 2016 onward.

== History ==
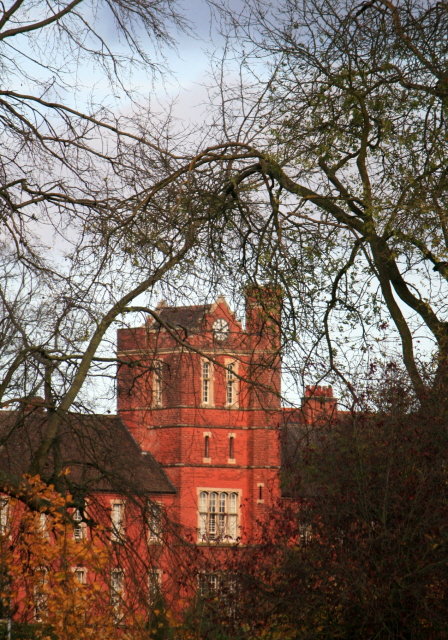
View of the school from West Park

The foundation of Trent College was proposed in 1868 by Francis Wright at a meeting of the Midland branch of the Clerical and Lay Association. His vision was to open a boarding school for "boys of the middle class" as a more affordable alternative to the public schools, and to counter the Anglo-Catholic leaning of the schools set up by the Woodard Trust. The foundation stone was laid by William Cavendish, 7th Duke of Devonshire. Today, the school still retains its ties with the Cavendish family through the Duke's descendant, Peregrine Cavendish, 12th Duke of Devonshire, who is president of the board of governors.

The school opened in April 1868 with 53 boys on roll, and, within four months, the number had risen to 118. By 1870, 225 boys were registered as pupils. The school's initial success was hit by the outbreak of scarlet fever in 1873 and the death of its first Headmaster, Thomas Ford Fenn, in 1883. Francis Wright was actively involved with the school until his death in 1873. In 1875, a school chapel was opened in his memory.

In 1975, the school welcomed its first girls into Sixth Form following the trend set by many previously single-sex independent schools. It became fully coeducational in 1992.

== Sexual abuse scandal and legal proceedings ==
The sexual abuse of pupils at Trent College was first revealed in 1989, leading to a major criminal investigation by Derbyshire Police.

As a result of the investigation, two teachers were prosecuted and convicted of serious sexual assaults against male pupils. Peter James Joseph O'Gorman pleaded guilty at Nottingham Crown Court on 6 April 1990, to two counts of buggery, one count of attempted buggery, and three counts of indecent assault, receiving a four-year sentence. Anthony Edmonds pleaded guilty at Reading Crown Court to four counts of buggery and seven counts of indecent assault, and was sentenced to a total of six years in prison.

In 2015, a local law firm announced that an out-of-court civil settlement had been reached with the school regarding a historic claim of sexual abuse. The announcement specified that the claim related to abuse by two former teachers who, the firm stated, had not been convicted of any crime.

== Buildings and facilities ==
The Warner Library was built by pupils in 1929 and contained about 6500 books, fiction, non-fiction and reference materials. The Obolensky, a modern lunch hall/meeting place, was opened in February 2008 and is named after Russian Prince Alexander Obolensky, a former pupil of Trent College. A new library (a conversion of the former dining hall conserving original wood panelling) was opened in 2010 and is named 'The Duke of Devonshire Library' after the school's president. The former Warner Library was converted into a Computer Science lab in 2016.

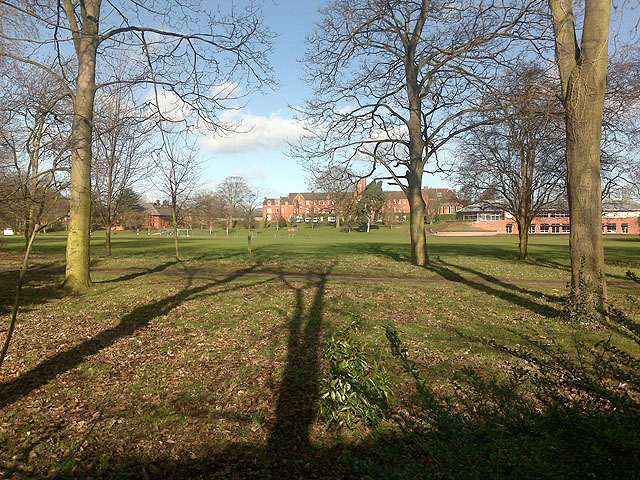
Trent College grounds

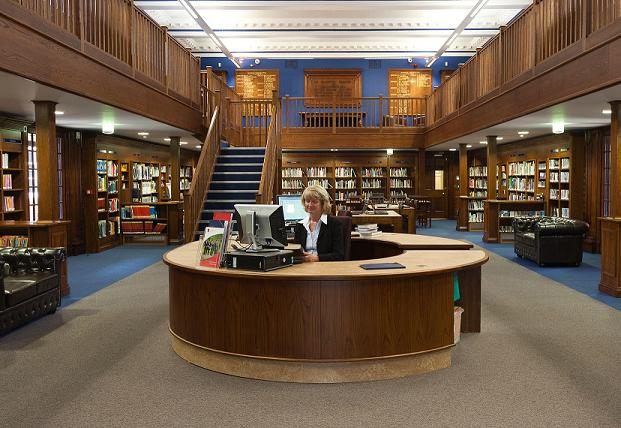
The School Library (Opened in 2010)

=== The chapel ===
The foundation stone of the chapel was laid after the death of Francis Wright. The building, which cost £300 and was designed by a Mr Robinson of Derby in 1875, has been re-modelled three times: first in 1949 by Sir Albert Richardson, president of the Royal Academy; the chancel was redesigned after a new organ was installed in 1976; and finally, in 2001, the pews and lighting were replaced. The west door curtain was a part of the interior of Westminster Abbey at the coronation of Queen Elizabeth II. The wooden collection plates are carved from olive wood from the Garden of Gethsemane outside Jerusalem, where Jesus Christ was arrested before his crucifixion. These were a bequest from the Broadhurst family.

As an Anglican school, pupils are required to attend chapel services throughout the week. In addition, boarders are required to attend Sunday services as well.

== Pastoral care ==
=== Houses ===
The Trent College House system incorporates all pupils, from Year 7 to Year 13. Each student is allocated into one of the 5 houses which can be identified either through the colour of House ties or badges. The houses are named after prominent figures in the history of Trent college.

| House | Color | Namesake |
|---|---|---|
| Cavendish | Purple | William Cavendish, 7th Duke of Devonshire |
| Hanbury | Red | A benefactor to the school and former Chairman of the Governors |
| Kemp | Blue | Sergeant Major Robert Kemp RM, in charge of PE, punishment drills and the school postman |
| Owen | Orange | Rev JRB Owen, second headmaster |
| Wright | Green | Francis Wright, founder |

=== Tutors ===
Normally pupils have the same tutor in their first two years (Year 7 and 8); a new tutor for their three years in Senior School and another tutor for their two years in Sixth Form. In summer 2010, the pastoral care programme was rated as 'Excellent' for Pastoral Care and 'Excellent' for Pupils Personal Development by the Independent Schools Inspectorate.

=== Boarding ===
Trent has been a boarding school since its foundation and welcomes pupils aged 11 and above. Each boarding house is run by a Head of House and assisted by prefects. The houses can accommodate between 30 and 54 students in single or double study bedrooms. Pupils are not required to board and most boarders generally return home for the weekend.

There are four boarding houses at Trent – two houses which have boarders from ages 11–18 (Shuker for boys & Bates for girls), one girls Sixth Form only (Martin) and one boys boarding house from years 11-13 (Blake). The houses are named after prominent figures in the history of Trent college.

== Co-curricular ==
=== Music ===
Every year the school hosts a number of concerts which feature its music groups. Many of its students are members of ensembles outside of school, such as The Nottingham Youth Orchestra and The National Children's Orchestra. The main musical event is the Spring Concert which is held at the Albert Hall annually.

=== Sport ===
Trent has a strong sporting tradition, and its athletes often compete at county and national level. The school has produced a number of successful athletes who have represented England at international level. At the core of Trent College's sports philosophy are the '3 Ps'—Participation, Progression, and Performance.

| Term | Gender | Major Sport |
|---|---|---|
| Michaelmas Term | Boys | Rugby |
| | Girls | Hockey |
| Lent Term | Boys | Hockey |
| | Girls | Netball |
| Trinity Term | Boys | Cricket |
| | Girls | Tennis |

On 29 March 2014, the Rugby 1st XV won the Natwest Cup Vase, beating Queen Elizabeth's Hospital Bristol in the Semi-Final and Exeter College in the Final.

== Notable alumni ==
Former pupils are known as "Old Tridents" and are entitled membership of the Old Tridents' Society.

- Reginald Philip Abigail, District Commissioner of Arakan during the fall of Burma in 1942
- Rex Alston, Cricket commentator
- Albert Ball VC MC, English World War I fighter pilot and flying ace
- John Birch, former Master of the Choristers at Chichester Cathedral
- Sir Howard Colvin, architectural historian
- Harry Daft (1866 – 1945), England footballer
- Thomas Fitton, cricketer and Royal Air Force officer
- Harry Gilby, actor
- David Gillmore, Baron Gillmore of Thamesfield
- Elizabeth Godwin, first female officer of The Life Guards
- Georgia Groome, actress
- Simon Hopkinson, cook and author
- Reverend Kenneth Hunt, England footballer and Olympic gold medallist
- Holly Kenyon, actress
- Clopton Lloyd-Jones, scorer of only goal of 1880 FA Cup Final
- Vivian MacKerrell, actor
- Alexander Obolensky, Russian prince and rugby international
- Lieutenant-Colonel Richard Parsons, Army marksman
- Kukrit Pramoj, thirteenth Prime Minister of Thailand
- Seni Pramoj, three times Prime Minister of Thailand
- Frederick Morton Radcliffe, executive chairman of Liverpool Anglical Cathedral building committee.
- Geoffrey Whitehead, actor

=== Staff ===
- Simon Hodgkinson, former England international rugby player
- Abraham Shuker, cricketer and founder of the Trent Association (now called the Old Tridents' Association)

== See also ==
- Listed buildings in Long Eaton
