= Kenneth Steel =

English painter

Kenneth Steel (RBA, SGA, 9 July 1906 – 1970) was a British painter and engraver, noted for his works of art in watercolor. As an accomplished draughtsman his work is noted for its intricate detail, which can be best seen in his landscapes views and street scenes, many of which were reproduced as designs for railway carriage prints and station billboard posters. Kenneth Steel was born in Sheffield, England to G. T. Steel, an artist and silver engraver. His elder brother, George Hammond Steel (1900–1960) was a successful landscape painter. Both brothers studied at Sheffield College of Art under Anthony Betts. During the 1920s Kenneth Steel studied briefly under the landscape artist, Stanley Royle, throughout their careers both artists remained close friends. Kenneth Steel supported and encouraged fellow Sheffield etcher, Leonard Beaumont. During World War II, both his mother, Annie and wife, Olive died during 'the Sheffield Blitz', victims of German bombing raids on the city during December 1940. His house took a direct hit resulting in the loss of much of his work, designs and engraved plates. Throughout the late 1930s and early 1940s he wrote several important articles on the art of engraving, pencil drawing and watercolour technique for the art periodical, 'The Artist'.

From his studios in Crookes and Lodge Moor, Sheffield, Steel produced much of his commercial work for several regional railway companies. His work is held by a number of public collections in Britain and Ireland; including the Waterford Municipal Art Collection where his watercolour "St Audeon's Church" can be seen in the Waterford Institute of Technology. In recent years, many of his works have been appeared at auction and his work has undergone a long over-due re-evaluation. Museums Sheffield hold small number of his engravings.

In 2022, a landmark exhibition, entitled "Places in Time The Art of Kenneth Steel" was shown at the Weston Park Museum in Sheffield.
