= 2011 Melon Music Awards =

2011 South Korean music award ceremony

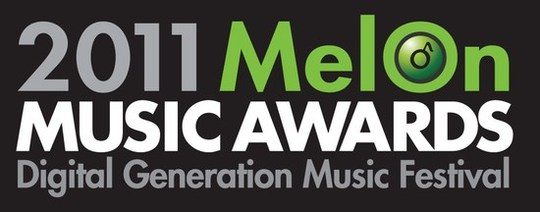
- Date: Thursday, November 24, 2011
- Location: Olympic Gymnastics Arena
- Country: South Korea
- Hosted by: Park Shin-hye, Leeteuk & Yoon Doo-joon

Highlights
- Most awards: Beast, IU, 2NE1, Super Junior (2 each)
- Most nominations: Beast, IU, 2NE1 (5 each)
- Album of the Year: 2NE1 2nd Mini Album
- Artist of the Year: Beast
- Song of the Year: "Good Day"
- Website: Melon Music Awards website

Television/radio coverage
- Network: MelOn, MBC every1, MBC Dramanet, MBC Game & MBC Life (South Korea); YouTube (Worldwide)

The 2011 Melon Music Awards were held on Thursday, November 24, 2011, at the Olympic Gymnastics Arena in Seoul, South Korea, the event's first use of the venue. Organized by Kakao M through its online music store Melon, the 2011 ceremony was the third installment of the event since its offline launch in 2009. Beast, IU and 2NE1 received the most nominations at the ceremony, have each been nominated five times. The trio along with Super Junior were the only artists who received multiple accolades, with all four artists winning two awards each. Furthermore, the aforementioned trio won the three daesang prizes at the event.

== Performers ==
List of performances at 2011 Melon Music Awards
| Artist(s) | Song(s) |
|---|---|
| Park Shin-hye | Opening (Music of Energy) |
| Lena Park | "That Is My World" |
| Lee Seung-hwan | "For Thousand Days" |
| Sunny Hill | "Pit-A-Pat" "Midnight Circus" |
| Huh Gak; Jin Bora | "Hello" |
| Sistar; Secret (Dance battle) | "Ma Boy" "Shy Boy" "How Dare You" "Starlight Moonlight" "So Cool" "Move" |
| f(x) | Intro "Pinocchio (Danger)" |
| IU | "Cruel Fairytale" "Good Day" (With Special Guest Kim Kyung-jin) |
| Beast | "On Rainy Days" "Fiction" |

== Presenters ==
- Park Shin-hye, Leeteuk & Yoon Doo-joon – Official host
- Kim Sung-soo & Kim Seon-woo – Best New Artist
- Kim Hyun-joong & Woori – Best Music Video
- Lim Tae-kyung & Cha Ji-yeon – Best Songwriter
- Lee Kwang-soo & Han Chae-ah – Hot Trend Award (Variety)
- Choi Hyo-sung – Hot Issue Segment
- Nam Tae-jeong & Moon Ji-ye – MBC Music Star Award
- Ki Tae-young & Jin Bora – Best R&B/Ballad Award
- Lee Eun-gyeol & Lee Hee-jin – Best OST Award
- Jung Seung-ho & Kim Se-ah – Culture Performer Award
- Hong Jong-hyun & Kim Kyung-jin – Best Rock Award & Best Rap/Hip Hop Award
- Nam Hee-suk & Lee Ji-seon – Netizen Popularity Award & Global Artist Award
- Bang Si-hyuk & Song Kyung-ah – Album of the Year
- Bae Cheol-soo – Artist of the Year & Song of the Year

== Winners and nominees ==
=== Main awards ===
Winners and nominees are listed below. Winners are listed first and emphasized in bold.

| Top 10 Artists (Bonsang) | Album of the Year (Daesang) |
|---|---|
| **Beast**; **BigBang**; **f(x)**; **IU**; **Lena Park**; **2NE1**; **Super Junior**; **Leessang**; **Secret**; **Sistar** | **2NE1 – 2NE1 2nd Mini Album**; Leessang – Asura Balbalta; Beast – Fiction and Fact; BigBang – Tonight; IU – Real |
| Artist of the Year (Daesang) | Song of the Year (Daesang) |
| **Beast**; 2NE1; Leessang; BigBang; IU | **IU – "Good Day"**; 2NE1 – "I Am the Best"; Beast – "On Rainy Days"; GG (Park Myung-soo and G-Dragon) featuring Park Bom – "Having an Affair"; T-ara – "Roly-Poly" |
| Best New Artist | Best Music Video |
| **Huh Gak**; F-ve Dolls; Kim Bo-kyung; Dal Shabet; Brave Girls | **T-ara – "Roly-Poly"**; 2PM – "Hands Up"; Miss A – "Good-bye Baby"; Brown Eyed Girls – "Sixth Sense"; Sunny Hill – "Midnight Circus" |
| Best Rap/Hip Hop Award | Best Rock Award |
| **GD & TOP – "Oh Yeah" (featuring Park Bom)**; Mighty Mouth – "Tok Tok" (featuring Soya); Verbal Jint – "You Look Good" (featuring The Black Skirts); Tablo – "Airbag" (featuring Naul of Brown Eyed Soul); Yoon Mi-rae – "Get It In" (featuring Tiger JK and Choi Jung-in) | **CNBLUE – "Intuition"**; 10cm – "Not That"; F.T. Island – "Hello Hello"; YB – "After Sending You"; Kiha & The Faces – "A Sort of Relationship" |
| Best R&B/Ballad Award | Best OST Award |
| **Kim Bum-soo – "Please"**; Davichi – "Don't Say Goodbye"; Baek Ji-young – "Today, I'm in Love with You"; Zia featuring Ha Dong-kyun – "The Way I Am"; 4Men – "Once While Living" | **Sunny Hill – "Pit-A-Pat" (from The Greatest Love)**; Baek Ji-young – "Today, I'm in Love with You" (from The Princess' Man); IU – "Someday" (from Dream High); Jung Yong-hwa – "You've Fallen for Me" (from Heartstrings); Taeyeon – "I Love You" (from Athena: Goddess of War) |
| Hot Trend Award (Variety) | Netizen Popularity Award |
| **Infinite Challenge – West Coast Highway Song Festival**; I Am a Singer – Part 2; Star Audition: The Great Birth – Part 8; Top Band – Part 10; Superstar K 3 – Top 11 | **Super Junior – "Mr. Simple"**; 2NE1 – "I Am the Best"; 2PM – "Hands Up"; Girl's Day – "Twinkle Twinkle"; Beast – "On Rainy Days"; BigBang – "Tonight"; Girls' Generation – "The Boys"; f(x) – "Hot Summer" |

=== Other awards ===
| Nominees | Winners |
|---|---|
| Songwriter Award | Jun Hye-sung |
| Global Artist Award | Girls' Generation |
| MBC Music Star Award | Baek Ji-young |
| Culture Performer Award | Lee Seung-hwan |
