= Lonely (2NE1 song) =

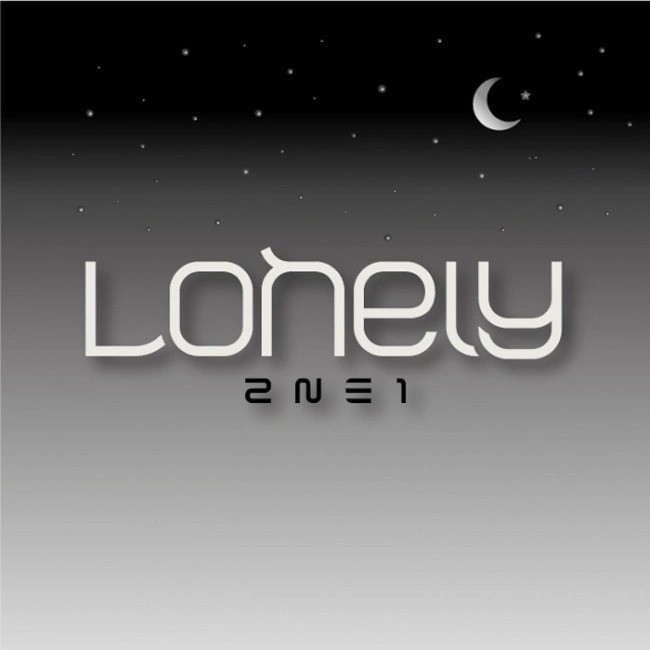

Single by 2NE1

from the EP 2NE1
- Released: May 12, 2011
- Recorded: 2011
- Genre: Pop
- Length: 3:29
- Label: YG
- Songwriters: Teddy Park; Kush
- Producers: Teddy Park; Kush

2NE1 singles chronology
"It Hurts (Slow)" (2010)	"Lonely" (2011)	"I Am the Best" (2011)

Music video
- "Lonely" on YouTube "Lonely" (Japanese ver.) on YouTube

"Lonely" is a song by South Korean girl group 2NE1, serving as one of the lead singles from their 2011 self-titled second EP. The single was written and produced by Teddy Park and Kush, the song was released via digital download and streaming on May 12, 2011 by YG Entertainment. The song was a commercial success, peaking at number 1 on the Gaon Digital Chart in addition to topping all of the South Korean real-time digital charts following its release, achieving a perfect all-kill.

A Japanese version of the song was released digitally on September 14, 2011 through YGEX, and was included in the Japanese edition of the extended play, titled Nolza.

== Background ==
The song was written and produced by the group's long-time collaborator and in-house YG Entertainment producer Teddy Park and Kush. Musically, the song is composed in the key of E major with a moderate tempo of 95 beats per minute, and has a runtime of 3:29. The instrumentals incorporates only stringed instruments, which include the guitar, cello, and violin and emphasizes the group's vocals. According to the CEO of YG Entertainment, Yang Hyun Suk, "2NE1’s new song counter feeds the people with an analogue sound unlike the majority who used strong electronics and house music and maybe that is why Will.i.am have [sic] found it interesting".

== Commercial performance ==
The single was a commercial success, immediately topping all of South Korean real-time digital charts following its release and achieved a perfect all-kill, making it the first song to achieve a perfect all-kill by a K-pop girl group since the concept's inception in 2010. During its debut week on the Gaon Digital Chart, the single placed at number two and sold 432,701 digital units. The following week, the song took the number one position, becoming the group's third number one single and sold an additional 465,735 units. "Lonely" was subsequently ranked number one of both the Gaon digital and download charts for the month of May, having accumulated an estimated 1,477,729 units in digital sales.

By the end of the year, "Lonely" became one of the best performing song's in the country, selling more than 2.9 million digital units and garnering over 23.3 million streams, and ranked at number four on the year-end Gaon Digital Chart for 2011.

== Music video and promotion ==
The Korean music video for "Lonely" was filmed on April 27, 2011 and was directed by Han Sa-min, who had previously directed the music video for Big Bang's fourth mini-special album's title song, "Love Song". The first teaser for "Lonely" was released on May 10 and featured CL and Minzy, and was followed by teasers featuring and Dara and Bom on May 11. The music video was uploaded to their official YouTube channel the next day. The cost of the outfits that 2NE1 featured in the music video, which consisted mostly of luxury brand Balmain, reportedly cost around ₩200 million ($180,000). In comparison, the production cost of the video itself was only about ₩150 million ($135,000), making the members' outfits more expensive than the video itself.

The Japanese edition of the music video was released on September 21 by YGEX along with the release of Nolza. The song was not extensively promoted on music programs; but on May 29, 2NE1 made a surprise two-part performance on SBS's Inkigayo with "Lonely" and Bom's solo single "Don't Cry". The appearance was made due to the overwhelming popularity of the two songs and was done as a gift to their fans. They later won a mutizen award for "Lonely".

== Track listing ==
- Digital download / streaming
1. "Lonely" – 3:29

== Accolades ==
"Lonely" was voted one of the top 8 idol hit songs of all time in a survey conducted by Research Panel Korea in 2013.

Awards and nominations for "Lonely"
Year	Organization	Award	Result	Ref.
2011	Cyworld Digital Music Awards	Song of the Year – May	Won	
2011	Mnet Asian Music Awards	Best Vocal Performance – Group	Won	
2012	Gaon Chart Music Awards	Song of the Year – May	Won	
2012	Golden Disc Awards	Digital Song Bonsang	Nominated	
2012	Myx Music Awards	Favorite K-pop Video Award	Nominated	

Music program awards
Program	Date	Ref.
Inkigayo	May 29, 2011	

== Covers and other usage ==
Producers of the South Korean talent show Superstar K 4 (2012) noted that "Lonely" was track sung the most during auditions for the program in Sydney, Australia. K-pop idols who have covered the song include Ailee, when she performed "Lonely" on Cultwo Show in March 2012. In January 2015, Lee Hi and AKMU covered "Lonely" on the talk show Healing Camp, Aren't You Happy. In 2020, Blackpink member Rosé sang "Lonely" during 24/365 with Blackpink, while in 2022, Stray Kids members Seungmin and Changbin performed a cover of the song at their Maniac concert in Seoul on September 18. In February 2024, Sungho, Taesan, and Leehan of BoyNextDoor performed a cover of "Lonely". Other artists who have covered it include Apink's Bomi, American singer Dia Frampton, Sungha Jung, and T-ara's Hyomin.

== Chart performance ==
=== Weekly charts ===
Chart (2011)	Peak position
South Korea (Gaon)	1

=== Monthly charts ===
Chart (2011)	Peak position
South Korea (Gaon)	1

=== Year-end charts ===
Chart (2011)	Position
South Korea (Gaon)	4

== Sales ==
Country	Sales
South Korea (digital)	3,040,000

== Release history ==
Release dates and formats
Region	Date	Format	Label	Ref.
Various	May 12, 2011	Digital download; streaming	YG Entertainment	
