= 2NE1 (2011 EP) =

EP by 2NE1

2NE1 2nd Mini Album
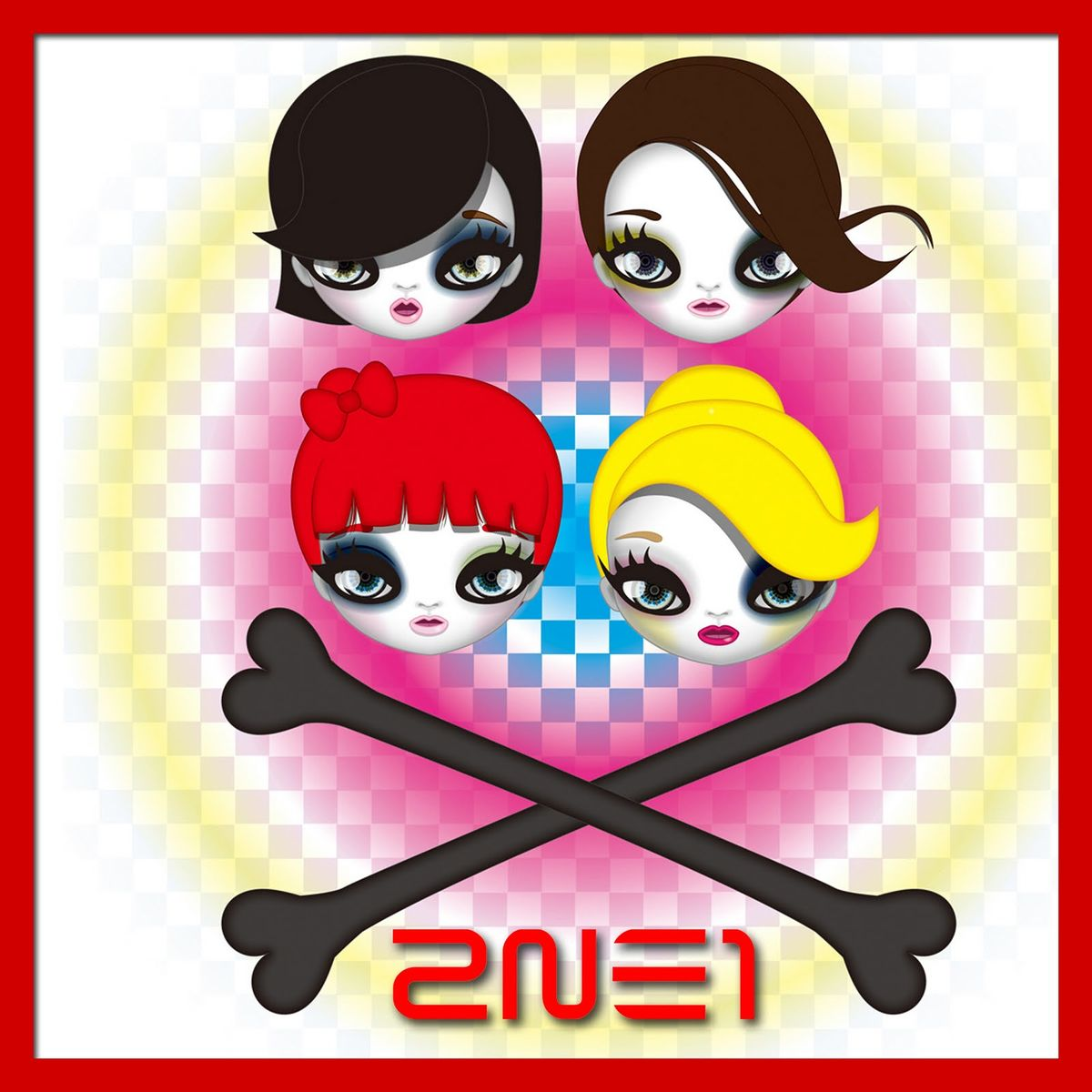
- Digital cover artwork

EP by 2NE1
- Released: July 28, 2011
- Recorded: 2010–2011
- Studio: YG Studios (Seoul)
- Genres: K-pop; dance-pop; electronic; hip hop
- Length: 21:41
- Languages: Korean; Japanese
- Labels: YG; KMP
- Producers: Teddy Park; Kush; Lydia Paek

2NE1 chronology
To Anyone (2010)	2NE1 2nd Mini Album (2011)	1st Live Concert (Nolza!) (2011)

Singles from 2NE1
- 1. "Don't Cry" Released: April 21, 2011; 2. "Lonely" Released: May 12, 2011; 3. "I Am the Best" Released: June 24, 2011; 4. "Hate You" Released: July 21, 2011; 5. "Ugly" Released: July 27, 2011

2NE1 (also known as 2NE1 2nd Mini Album) is the second eponymous extended play by South Korean girl group 2NE1. It was released in both physical and digital formats on July 28, 2011, through YG Entertainment. Like the group's previous material, 2NE1 2nd Mini Album was primarily written and produced by Teddy Park, with additional songwriting contributions from Kush and Lydia Paek. The EP was re-released as the group's debut Japanese record titled Nolza on September 21, 2011, under YGEX.

2NE1 was met with generally positive reviews from music critics, and was named amongst the best pop releases of the year by Spin. It was a commercial success upon release, where it reached number one on both the South Korean Gaon Album Chart and the Japanese Oricon Albums Chart. In Japan, 2NE1 became the first Korean group to reach number one with a debut record. It also appeared on the albums charts in Taiwan and peaked at number four on the US World Albums chart. The group embarked on their first concert tour in support of the release, titled the Nolza Tour, travelling throughout South Korea and Japan. A live DVD of the tour was released in November.

Five singles were released to promote the EP: Park Bom's solo "Don't Cry", "Lonely", "I Am the Best", "Hate You" and "Ugly". Each single saw success and reached number one on the Gaon Digital Chart (with the exception of "Hate You", which peaked at number three). Although the promotions for the first two singles were minimal, all five singles sold over 2,500,000 digital downloads in South Korea while "Don't Cry", "Lonely", and "I Am the Best" ranked in the top 10 on the year-end Gaon Digital Chart. The success of the EP led it to win Album of the Year at the 2011 Melon Music Awards.

== Development and background ==
On April 18, 2011, 2NE1 announced they would postpone their Japanese debut due to the 2011 Tōhoku earthquake and tsunami and would resume Korean release plans, pushing the extended play's promotions forward, from April to July.

Plans for the album's promotions were later released on YG Life's blog on April 27, 2011, where the group stated that they we will be releasing a new single every three weeks leading up to the album's release in July. The group stated that the reason behind this plan was because they were more than satisfied with the level of quality in the album's track list and intended to use them all as title tracks for its promotion. The full extended play was made available on July 28, 2011.

== Promotion and release ==
"Usually, people will only remember the title song, and a lot of the songs on the albums never reach their full potential. We wanted all of our songs to shine. Every 3 weeks, we worked our hardest to reveal one new song at a time [...]. It's also interesting to point out that none of the five songs are related."

— CL commenting on the rollout of the extended play.

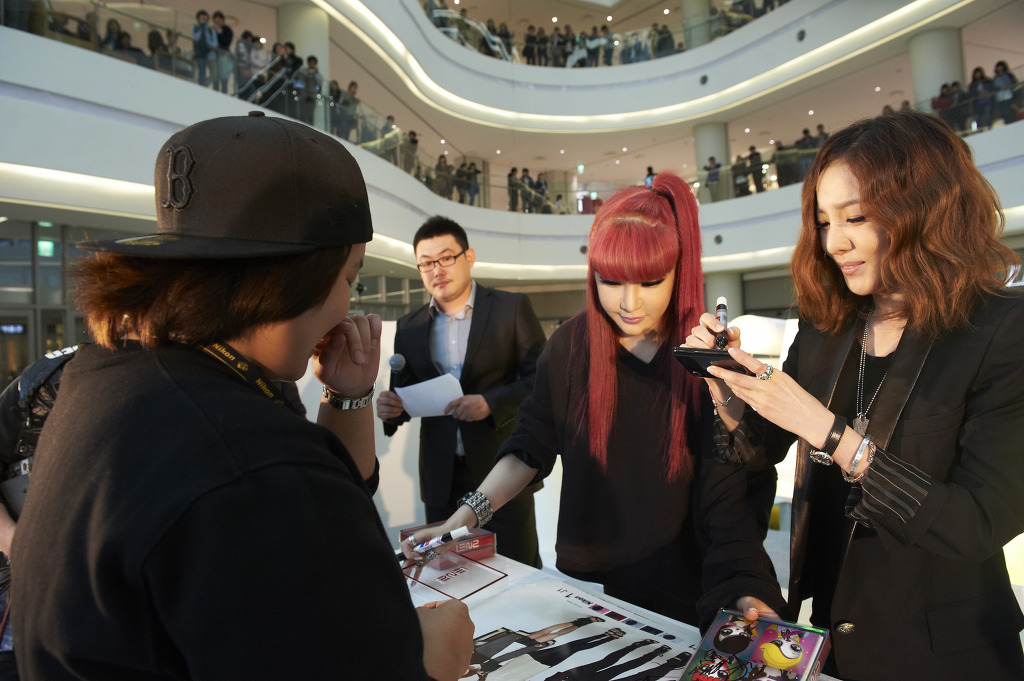
Bom and Dara at a signing event for the EP in 2011.

Park Bom's solo track "Don't Cry" was released as the first single on April 21. It was then followed by the group's single "Lonely" on May 11. Both songs topped the Gaon Digital Chart; in addition, "Lonely" became the first song to achieve a perfect all-kill by a K-pop girl group since the concept's inception in 2010. Neither were promoted extensively on music shows; but on May 29, the group made a surprise two-part performance with both songs on SBS's Inkigayo. The surprise appearance was attributed to the popularity of the two songs and was done as a gift to their fans.

On June 24, the third single "I Am the Best" was released at midnight, and subsequently topped all South Korean real-time charts, achieving another perfect all-kill. The song gained international recognition and is often regarded as an industry classic. It was performed for several weeks on the music programs Inkigayo, Show! Music Core and M Countdown. The plans for a mini album then stated another digital single would soon follow along with the release of the group's second mini album.

"Hate You" was initially intended for their second album To Anyone, but was later included into the EP's tracklist. It was released one week prior to the mini album's release on July 21 and became a top-three hit. The next single "Ugly", became the EP's fourth number one single, and won three music program wins during the course of its run. It ended the album's promotions on SBS's Inkigayo on August 21.

Following their Korean promotions, the group announced the release of the album in Japan under the title Nolza. It was released on September 21, 2011, by YGEX, a newly created label by YG Entertainment Japan in association with Avex. They appeared on the Japanese music program Music Station to promote the EP, performing the lead single "I Am the Best".

== Critical reception ==
The album ranked sixth on Spin magazine's list of "20 Best Pop Albums of 2011", placing ahead of Ellie Goulding, Coldplay and Rihanna. The publication said that "it might be the year's most boldly thrilling recorded statement", featuring the collision of various genres, from electro-house, hip-hop, and pop-rock guitar. In 2012, the same publication ranked "Ugly" at number 9 and "I Am the Best" at number 3 in their list of 21 Greatest K-pop Songs of All Time, while Stereogum included both songs in their list of 20 Best K-pop Music Videos at number 6 and 1, respectively. FrancoMusique named the EP one of the 20 best albums of the decade, writing that the "six-song EP would go down in history" as "[2NE1] became K-pop queens overnight."

== Accolades ==
Awards and nominations for 2NE1 2nd Mini Album
Organization	Year	Category	Result	Ref.
Melon Music Awards	2011	Album of the Year	Won	
Mnet Asian Music Awards	2011	Album of the Year	Nominated	

Music program awards
Song	Program	Date
"Lonely"	Inkigayo	May 29, 2011
"I Am the Best"	Inkigayo	July 17, 2011
"I Am the Best"	Music Bank	August 5, 2011
"Ugly"	M Countdown	August 4, 2011
"Ugly"	Inkigayo	August 7, 2011
"Ugly"	Inkigayo	August 14, 2011

== Commercial performance ==
2NE1 2nd Mini Album debuted at number one on the Gaon Album Chart in the chart issue dated July 24–30, 2011. It was the top-selling album in the month of July with 54,900 copies being sold in just three days. In Japan, Nolza claimed the top spot on the weekly Oricon Albums Chart, where it became the first Japanese debut album by a South Korean group to reach number one, and the second album by a K-pop girl group to top the chart in its history. Elsewhere, the record debuted atop the Taiwanese G-Music East Asian album chart in the issue dated August 26 – September 1, 2011, making it the group's first number-one album in the country. It additionally peaked at number 12 on the combo record chart during the same week. In the United States, the EP peaked at number four on the Billboard US World Albums chart and number 34 on the Top Heatseekers Album chart.

2NE1 2nd Mini Album was the 14th best-selling album in South Korea during 2011 according to the Gaon Album Chart. It re-appeared on the year-end Gaon Album Chart in 2012 at number 77, selling a cumulative 104,000 copies. The album has since sold over 114,000 copies in South Korea as of September 2016. The singles from 2NE1 2nd Mini Album showed to be some of the most popular songs in South Korea during 2011; "Lonely", "Don't Cry" and "I Am the Best" were ranked fourth, fifth and seventh on the year-end Gaon Digital Chart, respectively. "Ugly" and "Hate You" additionally ranked within the top 50. All five of the album's singles reached number one on all streaming record charts in South Korea upon release, marking the first time an artist achieved five consecutive "all kills".

== Track listing ==
2NE1 2nd Mini Album – Standard edition
No.	Title	Lyrics	Music	Length
1.	"I Am the Best" (내가 제일 잘 나가; Naega jeil jal naga)	Teddy	Teddy	3:30
2.	"Ugly"	Teddy	Teddy, Lydia Paek	4:08
3.	"Lonely"	Teddy	Teddy, Kush	3:29
4.	"Hate You"	Teddy	Teddy	3:33
5.	"Don't Cry" (Bom solo)	Teddy, Lydia Paek	Teddy, Lydia Paek	3:12
6.	"Don't Stop the Music" (new version – with alternative lyrics)	Kush	Kush	3:50
Total length:				21:41

2NE1 2nd Mini Album – International release
No.	Title	Lyrics	Length
1.	"Ugly"	Teddy	4:08
2.	"Lonely"		3:29
3.	"Hate You"		3:33
4.	"Don't Cry" (Bom solo)		3:12
5.	"Don't Stop the Music" (new version – with alternative lyrics)		3:50
Total length:			21:41

Nolza – Japanese edition
No.	Title	Length
1.	"I Am the Best" (Japanese)	3:31
2.	"Ugly" (Japanese)	4:11
3.	"Lonely" (Japanese)	3:30
4.	"Hate You" (Japanese)	3:33
5.	"Don't Stop the Music" (Japanese)	3:50
Total length:		18:32

Nolza DVD – Type A
No.	Title	Length
1.	"I Am the Best" (Japanese)
2.	"Ugly" (Japanese)
3.	"Lonely" (Japanese)
4.	"Hate You" (Japanese)

Nolza DVD – Type B
No.	Title	Length
1.	"Highlights from 2NE1TV Season 1 & 2"

== Chart performance ==
=== Weekly charts ===
Chart (2011)	Peak position
Japanese Albums (Oricon)	16
Japanese Albums (Oricon) Japanese version	1
Japanese Top Albums (Billboard) Japanese version	2
South Korean Albums (Gaon)	1
Taiwanese Albums (G-Music)	12
Taiwanese East Asian Albums (G-Music)	1
US World Albums (Billboard)	4
US Heatseekers Albums (Billboard)	34

=== Monthly charts ===
Chart (2011)	Peak position
Japanese Albums (Oricon) Japanese version	11
South Korean Albums (Gaon)	1

=== Year-end charts ===
Chart (2011)	Position
South Korean Albums (Gaon)	14

Chart (2012)	Position
South Korean Albums (Gaon)	77

== Sales ==
Region	Certification	Certified units/sales
Japan	—	57,000
South Korea	—	114,406

== Release history ==
Release history and formats for 2NE1 2nd Mini Album
Region	Date	Edition(s)	Format(s)	Label(s)
Various	July 28, 2011	Korean	Digital download; streaming	YG
South Korea	July 28, 2011	Korean	CD; digital download; streaming	KMP Holdings
Taiwan	August 26, 2011	Korean	CD; digital download; streaming	Warner Music Taiwan
China	August 26, 2011	Korean	CD; digital download; streaming	Warner Music Taiwan
Japan	September 21, 2011	Japanese	CD; digital download; streaming	YGEX
Japan	September 21, 2011	Japanese	CD+DVD	YGEX
Thailand	October 7, 2011	Korean	CD	GMM Grammy
Philippines	May 26, 2012	Korean	CD	YG; Universal
