= Hate You (2NE1 song) =

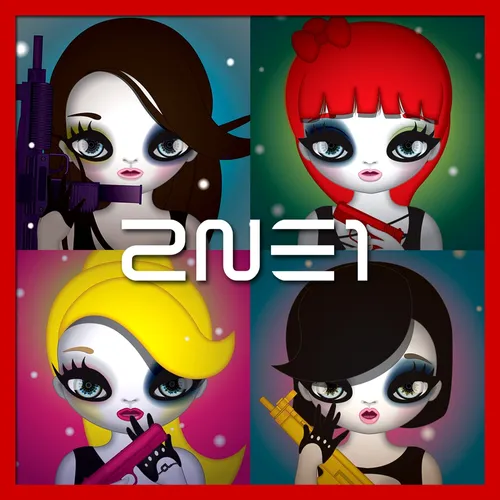

Single by 2NE1

from the EP 2NE1
- Released: July 21, 2011
- Recorded: 2010
- Genre: Electronic
- Length: 3:31
- Label: YG
- Songwriter: Teddy Park
- Producer: Teddy Park

2NE1 singles chronology
"I Am the Best" (2011)	"Hate You" (2011)	"Ugly" (2011)

Music video
- "Hate You" on YouTube

"Hate You" is a song by South Korean girl group 2NE1. The Korean version is the third single from the group's self-titled EP and was released by YG Entertainment on July 21, 2011. The Japanese version is included on the Japanese version of the EP, titled Nolza, released on August 10, 2011. The song was written and produced by YG's in-house producer Teddy Park.

== Background ==
"Hate You" was digitally released worldwide on July 21, 2011, under the group's label, YG Entertainment. In the group's television show, 2NE1 TV, producer Teddy Park revealed that the song was originally called "Fuck You", but was later modified to a "clean" version. He played a snippet of the original track but the word "fuck" was censored. From the same show, CL said that the song was supposed to be included on their debut album To Anyone.

== Commercial performance ==
The single peaked at number three on Gaon Digital Chart upon its initial release, and reached number four on the Billboard Korea K-pop Hot 100 chart. In South Korea, "Hate You" sold over 2.58 million digital copies.

== Promotion ==
The song was promoted through live performances on shows such as Inkigayo and M Countdown during the month of August 2011. The animated music video for the song, produced and directed by Mari Kim, shows the girls trying to take down a red-headed terrorist and achieved over thirty-five million views on YouTube.

== Charts ==
=== Weekly charts ===
Chart (2011)	Peak position
South Korea (Gaon)	3
South Korea (K-pop Hot 100)	4
US World Digital Songs (Billboard)	2

=== Monthly charts ===
Chart (2011)	Peak position
South Korea (Gaon)	9

=== Year-end charts ===
Chart (2011)	Position
South Korea (Gaon)	46
