= Leonora Moore =

Leonora Lim-Moore
- Other name: Leo
- Occupations: Film actress; Film director; Film producer; Screenwriter; Composer
- Years active: 2009–present
- Known for: East (2011); The Taiwan Oyster (2012)

Leonora Lim-Moore is a British film actress, writer and director, known for her lead role as Nikita in The Taiwan Oyster (2012), directed by Mark Jarrett and for her directorial debut East, in which she also starred as 'Elva', and which won Best Feature Film at the UK Film Festival in December 2011.

In 2015, her second co-directed feature film "Made In Taiwan", filmed in Taipei, Taiwan, and starring Alexander Jeremy, Ester Yang and Mason Lee, won 5 awards, including Best UK Film at the Manchester International Film Festival 2016.

== Background ==
Lim-Moore was accepted to The University of Oxford (Wadham College) to read a four-year master's degree in astrophysics and particle physics. She lived in Japan for several years and traveled to Los Angeles to receive acting training before returning to England to focus on her acting. Together with her brother, Jonny Moore, she co-directed 'Hear The Doors', a feature film that explores the ideas and mysteries of the Universe through the eyes of a 5-yr old boy.

== Career ==
In 2009, Leonora performed in theatre works The Sister's Walk, Tell Me, DMV Tyrant, Shampoo, and Stop Kiss for Black Box Theatre.

For her first effort as a filmmaker, Leonora was writer, director, producer, and composer of the feature film East (2011). It subsequently won Best Feature Film at the 2011 UK Film Festival.

=== Filmography ===
As actress

- I Have A Bad Feeling About This (2014)
- Brothers' Day [TAIWAN] (2014)
- Surviving Alba (2013)
- The Taiwan Oyster [TAIWAN] (2012)
- East (2011) as Elva
- Welcome to Minou [JAPAN] (2009) as Geisha

As filmmaker

- East (2011)
- Hear The Doors (2013)

== Recognition ==
Twitch Film made note of Moore's performance in The Taiwan Oyster, and wrote that the onscreen chemistry between Billy Harvey and Leonora Lim-Moore "is at times breathtaking". Also toward that film, Don Clinchy of the Slackerwood website wrote that Moore did "a great job as Nikita, a smart, savvy woman who is a sober, grounding influence on her intemperate traveling companions."

=== Awards and nominations ===
- 2011, Winner, Best Feature Film at UK Film Festival for East (2011)
