= Shaun Troke =

British director and former actor (born 1978)

- Born: Shaun Stephen Troke; 19 June 1978 (age 46); Brighton, Sussex, England, UK
- Occupation(s): Film director, screenwriter, actor
- Years active: 1998–present

Shaun Stephen Troke (born 19 June 1978) is a British director and former actor. He first came to attention in the late 1990s after appearing as Pippin in The Adam and Joe Show.

Troke was the director of several successful low budget features, including Martyr, the teen horror film Sparrow, and the found footage film Untitled.

Troke is the executive of his own film company, Shaunywa Films.
