= Sophie Hulme =

British accessories designer

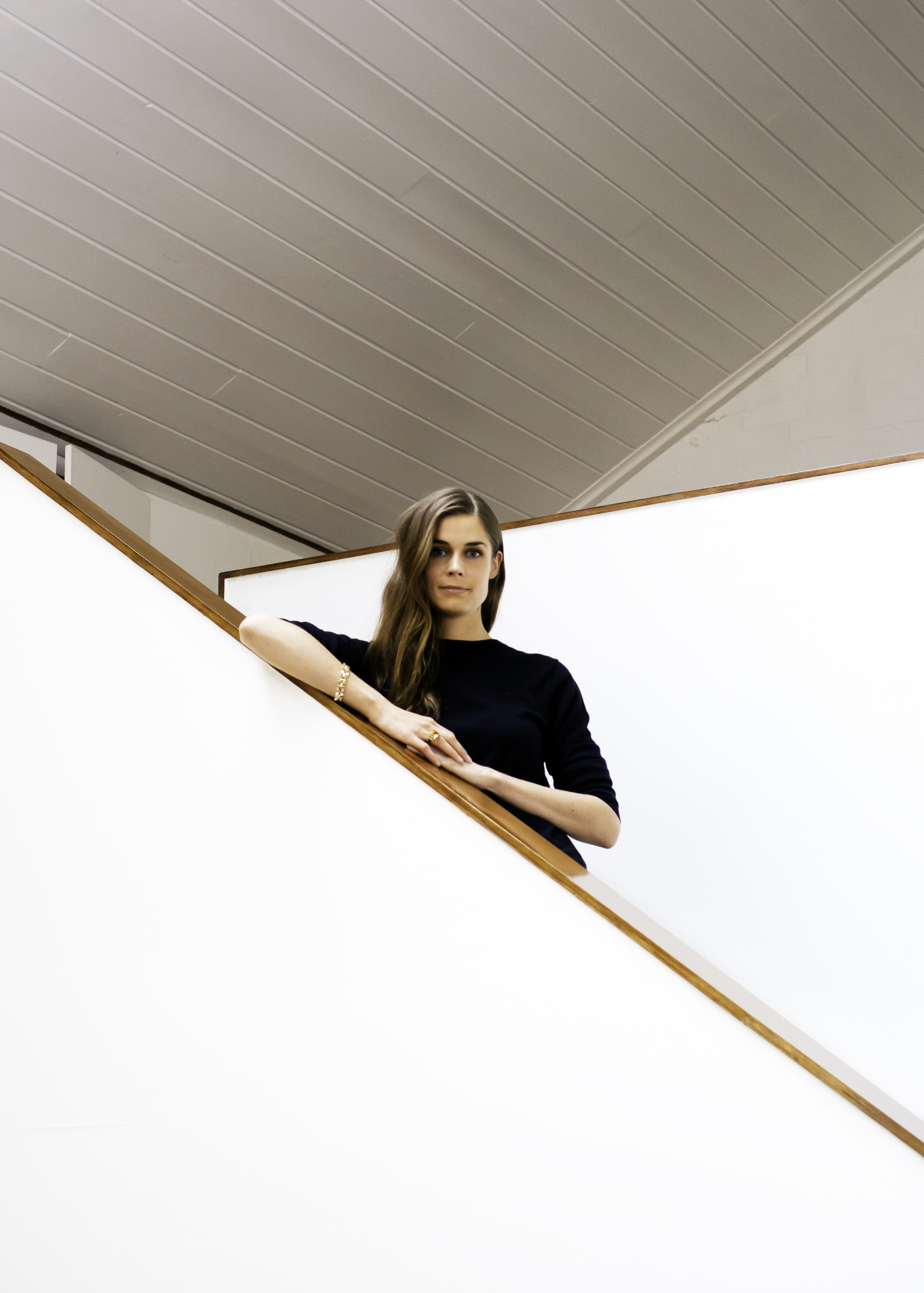
Sophie Hulme

Sophie Hulme is a British accessories designer.

== Education ==
She studied Fashion Design at Kingston University. Hulme graduated in 2007, and won awards for both student and collection of the year.

== Career ==
Hulme launched her own label in 2011. Hulme's studio is in Islington, North London.

Hulme was awarded a British Fashion Award in the "Emerging Talent, Accessories" category in 2012. She received the Elle/BFC Talent Launchpad in 2011. In 2013 Hulme collaborated with Globetrotter in a collection of trunks. In 2015 Samantha Cameron gifted a Sophie Hulme bag to the Chinese First Lady Peng Liyuan. The same year, the designer launched an eCommerce website. In 2016 she launched a collection of eveningwear and occasion bags, inspired by her own wedding. In 2017 Hulme was nominated for the Vogue Fashion Fund Award. Her collections are stocked in 200 locations and 30 countries.
