= Billboard Korea =

South Korean branch of Billboard

- Native name: 주식회사 빌보드코리아
- Type: Subsidiary
- Industry: Mass media
- Founded: August 1, 2023; 3 years ago
- Headquarters: Seoul, South Korea
- Key people: Yuna Kim (publisher and CEO)
- Website: www.billboard.co.kr

Billboard Korea (Korean: 빌보드코리아) is the South Korean branch of the American music and entertainment publication Billboard. The current operation officially launched in August 2024 and produces music journalism, digital and print content, industry rankings, and record charts focused on the South Korean music industry.

The current Billboard Korea is the third operation to use the Billboard name in South Korea. Earlier ventures were established through licensing arrangements with South Korean companies, beginning in 2009 and followed by a second operation in 2017. Unlike its predecessors, the current Billboard Korea has been described as a local subsidiary operating under the direct management of Billboard headquarters. Its publisher and chief executive officer is Yuna Kim.

== History ==
=== Earlier Korean operations ===
The first attempt to establish Billboard in South Korea began in 2009 through a locally operated licensing arrangement. A South Korean company named Billboard Korea (빌보드코리아), headed by Lee Hee-seok, was registered in Seoul in June 2009. In August, Billboard identified South Korean company ViewLife, Inc. as a new licensee for Billboard Korea and identified Lee as ViewLife's chief executive. The following month, the Korea Entertainment Producer's Association (KEPA) announced plans to introduce a Billboard-branded domestic music chart and distribute Korean music news and content through Billboard's international network. The Billboard Korea website was expected to open in October, with the Korean chart scheduled to begin appearing through Billboard around December.

The planned rollout was delayed. In March 2010, OSEN reported that the Billboard Korea website had been constructed but had not opened normally and that the planned December 2009 introduction of the Korean chart had also not taken place.

On August 25, 2011, Billboard and Billboard Korea launched the Billboard K-Pop Hot 100, the second Billboard song chart established in Asia after the Japan Hot 100. The chart initially ranked songs using digital sales from major South Korean music services and mobile downloads, and its weekly rankings were published in South Korea and the United States through Billboard's platforms and the Billboard Korea website.

By 2014, Billboard Korea had become involved in a series of disputes between its management and former KEPA officials. In March, its chief executive was arrested on allegations of fraud and breach of trust amid ongoing civil and criminal disputes. Contemporary reporting described Billboard Korea as a South Korean corporation that paid an annual licensing fee to the American Billboard and compiled and analyzed the K-Pop Hot 100 before supplying the chart data to the U.S. publication. The K-Pop Hot 100 was discontinued later that year, and by October Korean media reported that Billboard Korea was undergoing closure procedures after its operations had effectively broken down.

Billboard returned to the South Korean market in 2017 with a second Billboard Korea operation. In December, it announced the establishment of Billboard Korea (주식회사 한국빌보드), headed by Kim Jin-hee, following approximately 18 months of preparation with the U.S. publication. The operation provided K-pop charts and related news to Billboard and offered content through online, mobile and social-media services, while the K-Pop Hot 100 was revived after a three-year absence. The second Korean operation subsequently ceased activities without a formal announcement.

=== 2024 relaunch ===
In January 2024, Billboard announced plans to establish a new Korean operation in partnership with Global Entertainment Media Group (GEMG). GEMG chairperson Yuna Kim was named publisher of Billboard Korea, with an official website and digital platform planned for the spring and the first issue of Billboard K Vol. 1 scheduled for June.

At a press conference in Seoul on April 15, Billboard president Mike Van and Kim, by then identified as Billboard Korea's publisher and chief executive officer, presented the new operation ahead of its planned June launch. Korea JoongAng Daily described Billboard Korea as a local subsidiary of the U.S. Billboard brand, contrasting it with the earlier Korean ventures, which had primarily been operated by domestic businesses through licensing arrangements. Kim said that Billboard Korea would function as the K-music team of Billboard headquarters and develop editorial, digital and social-media content in cooperation with the U.S. organization. She also stated that the new operation was unrelated to the previous Korean ventures and would operate under the control of Billboard headquarters.

During Van's visit, Billboard and Billboard Korea also established partnerships with several major South Korean companies. On April 16, they signed a memorandum of understanding with Naver Pay concerning cooperation between its payment services and Billboard Korea's planned entertainment activities. The following day, Kakao Entertainment entered into a strategic partnership with Billboard and Billboard Korea to promote K-pop and related content internationally, collaborate on artist marketing and promotion, and develop related business models. On April 18, CJ ENM signed an agreement with the two organizations covering the global promotion of K-pop, including cooperation on digital content and live events.

The planned June publication of Billboard K Vol. 1 did not take place as scheduled, delaying the formal launch. In July, Billboard Korea announced that the first issue would instead be unveiled on August 27 in conjunction with the inaugural Billboard K Power 100. In August, Korea JoongAng Daily reported that the magazine, Power 100 list and a bilingual biographical dictionary of Korean music artists would be presented at the launch event. Billboard Korea officially launched on August 27 at the Billboard K Power 100 event in Seoul.

== Publications and rankings ==
Billboard Korea produces Korean-language music and entertainment coverage through its website and digital platforms and publishes print material under the Billboard K name. The first issue, Billboard K Vol. 1, was released in conjunction with Billboard Korea's official launch in August 2024.

At its launch, Billboard Korea also introduced the annual K-Pop Artist Biographical Dictionary, a bilingual Korean-English publication profiling K-pop artists selected for their activity during the preceding year. The inaugural edition accompanied the Billboard K-Pop Artist 100, a ranking of Korean music artists based on their performance on the Billboard 200, Billboard Hot 100 and Billboard Boxscore touring data.

Billboard Korea also organizes the Billboard K Power 100, which recognizes influential figures in the South Korean and Asian music industries. The inaugural edition was presented on August 27, 2024, as part of Billboard Korea's launch event in Seoul.

== Record charts ==
In December 2025, Billboard and Billboard Korea introduced two weekly song charts, the Billboard Korea Global K-Songs and the Billboard Korea Hot 100. Developed jointly by Billboard's United States operation and Billboard Korea, the charts use streaming and digital-sales data from domestic and international music services and are published through both Billboard and Billboard Korea.

The Billboard Korea Global K-Songs ranks the worldwide performance of K-music using streaming and digital-purchase activity from markets around the world, including South Korea. The Billboard Korea Hot 100 measures the popularity of songs within the South Korean market regardless of language.

== See also ==
- Billboard (magazine)
- Billboard charts
- Billboard K-Town
- Billboard K-Pop Artist 100
- K-pop Hot 100
- Billboard Korea Hot 100
- List of K-pop on the Billboard year-end charts
- List of K-pop on the Billboard charts
- List of K-pop albums on the Billboard charts
- List of K-pop songs on the Billboard charts
- Timeline of K-pop at Billboard
- Timeline of K-pop at Billboard in the 2020s
