= Whang Bo-ryung =

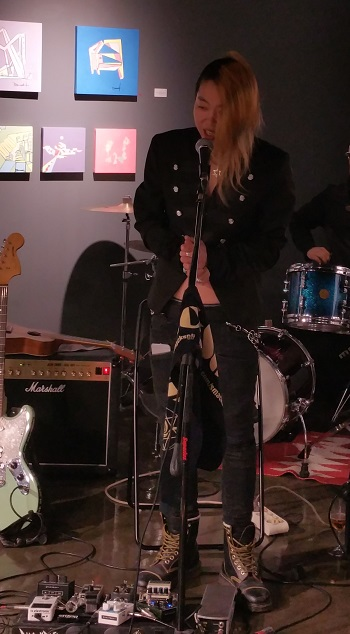
- Performing with Smacksoft at her solo art exhibit, "Capital City : Soul", Seoul, Oct. 2015

Background information
- Born: February 26, 1970 (age 56); Seoul, South Korea
- Genres: Post-punk; experimental rock
- Occupations: Singer-songwriter; painter
- Instruments: Vocals; guitar; ukulele
- Years active: 1998–present
- Website: smacksoft.net

Korean name
- Hangul: 황보령
- RR: Hwang Boryeong
- MR: Hwang Poryŏng

Whang Bo-ryung (Korean: 황보령; born February 26, 1970) is a South Korean-American singer, songwriter and painter. She is the lead vocalist and founder of the band Smacksoft. She released her first solo album, Cat With Three Ears, in April 1998.

== Life and career ==
=== 1970–97: Early life in Seoul, move to New York ===
Whang was born in Seoul and relocated to Busan in the fifth grade of elementary school. In 1985, at age fifteen, she moved to the United States with her family. During her sophomore year in high school, she received an acoustic guitar as a birthday gift and started playing and writing music in her diary. She graduated from Rush–Henrietta Senior High School, and began college at the Pratt Institute in art studies. She and a male college friend formed the duo Sun & Fish and started busking on the streets of New York City. She then left college, without graduating, for an "extended tramp around the world to find herself and her voice", visiting Japan, Vietnam, France and Thailand.

=== 1998–2007: Cat With Three Ears, Sun Sign and Smacksoft formation ===
She returned to Korea in the late 1990s and started performing as a solo artist, playing a lot of acoustic shows with her guitar, in Hongdae. She said the atmosphere was different then, with fewer bands, and people found her fascinating, with her New York punk look – colorful hair and piercings. In 1998, she released her first solo album, Cat with Three Ears, then a second album in 2001, "Sun Sign", which included her recently formed band Smacksoft, with the full name being "Whang Bo-ryung = Smacksoft", who joined her on the last track. After touring with the band in South Korea and Japan, she decided to take time off, and in 2003 she returned to New York and the Pratt Institute, to study sculpture, and graduated with a B.F.A. in 2007.

=== 2008–present: Smacksoft 2.5, As If Nothing Ever Happened and Smacksoft re-formed ===
In 2008, she returned to Seoul and created the EP SmackSoft 2.5 which she released in January 2009 with a re-formed Smacksoft band.

In 2010, a Smacksoft album, Shines in the Dark, was nominated for Best Modern Rock Album by the Korean Music Awards.

In April and August 2012, she joined other indie singers, led by Song Eun-ji, to perform three concerts and release the album Please Talk, to benefit comfort women.

In 2013, Smacksoft received a second nomination for the Best Modern Rock Album by the Korean Music Awards for the album Follow Your Heart.

On October 20, 2013 and February 16, 2014, she held pre-release concerts for her third solo album, an acoustic one, As If Nothing Ever Happened, released on February 27, 2014, just prior to Smacksoft's travels to the U.S. for SXSW and to Europe and Amsterdam's CinemAsia Film Festival. As If Nothing Ever Happened ranked number 35 on the K-Indie Chart. She said she felt like producing "simple acoustic music" for a calming effect, to counterbalance some of the chaotic world events like the 2011 Tōhoku earthquake and tsunami and the following Fukushima Daiichi nuclear disaster that had upset her. She said some of the songs were new, but some were written nearly twenty years ago.

On March 13, 2014, she performed with Smacksoft at SXSW and Jonathan Cha of KoreAm called the Seoulsonic show opener "a powerful, 'post-punk' punch to the face" with "Whang Bo Ryung rhythmically rattling everyone at the venue down to the tent covering the stage."

In the fall of 2015, she was featured in the album Golden Indie Collection and the book The Musician by Choi Kyu-sung. She and Smacksoft participated in a concert celebrating the photographic exhibition that accompanied the book's release.

== Artistry ==
=== Musical style and influences ===
Starting as a soloist in the 1990s, Whang's music derived from punk and early German industrial techno style music. She writes most of her own music that she produces for herself and for her band. She describes Bach as a big musical influence, along with life itself. Kim Young-jin of The Korea Times and Sabrina Hill of Groove Korea magazine have labeled the sound avant-garde.

=== Art and performance art ===
She creates the artwork for her album covers and for Smacksoft, and often uses her art and music for performance art, combining painting exhibitions and videos with a live concert, such as one performed with Smacksoft and the band Asian Chairshot on November 16, 2013, called "Sublime Re-treat".

Her art work has been shown with others, including a joint exhibition on January 1–20, 2013, "Rockstar", at the Gallery Toast in Bangbae-dong Seoul; her contribution was a painting of Brian Eno. She has held a number of solo exhibits, including one held December 20–31, 2015, at the Namsan gallery Daeppang Four Studio Gallery, which included concert performances.

== Discography ==
=== Studio albums ===
- Cat With Three Ears (1998)
- The Sun Sign (2001)
- As If Nothing Ever Happened (2014)

=== Soundtracks ===
Year	Title	TV Series
2001	"Love Song"	Club Butterfly
2001	"Sunshine"	No Blood No Tears

=== As featured artist ===
- Dosirak Tuk Gong Dae (도시락특공대) (1997)
- "Maya" (She Wanted, 2000)
- "Gunpowder Cabin" (Fanatic, 2009)
- "Marching Through War" (Please Talk, 2012)
