= Seoulsonic =

Annual concert tour

Seoulsonic 서울소닉
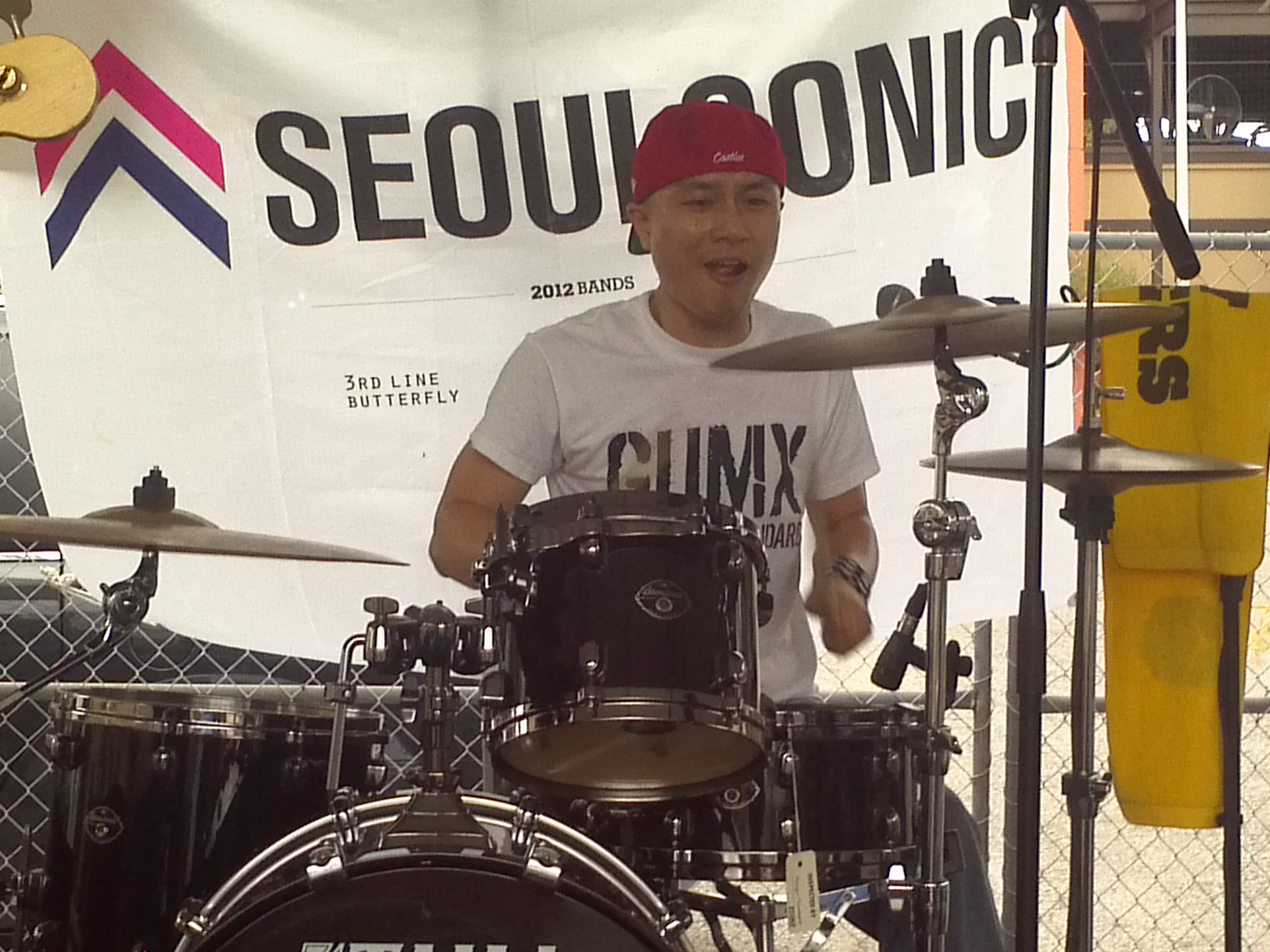
- Seoulsonic banner, 2K12 Austin, Texas; Yellow Monsters drummer.
- Genre: Korean indie, Rock music, Electronic music, K-pop
- Dates: (dates vary)
- Frequency: Annual
- Locations: Canada, United States
- Inaugurated: 2011
- Organizer: DFSB Kollective
- Website: Seoulsonic

Seoulsonic (SEOULSONIC), (Korean: 서울소닉) is an annual concert tour in the United States and Canada, organized by the DFSB Kollective with support from the Korea Creative Content Agency (KOCCA), which began in 2011 in an effort to introduce South Korea's indie music culture to the West. The tour includes annual stops at SXSW in Austin, Texas and the Canadian Music Week in Toronto, Canada.

== History ==
Seoulsonic evolved from a quarterly concert series, hosted by the DFSB Kollective in South Korea, into an international tour with the goal of assisting Korean indie bands, in particular "alt-rok" bands, to build an international audience for success beyond Hongdae. The tour started in 2011, at which time the music scene was described as follows: "the rock genre is still the obscure cousin of pop, dance and hip-hop, and other revenue streams such as product endorsements and television appearances aren’t readily available to its musicians."

=== Band selection ===
The selection process takes place in Seoul, usually at the annual Seoul International Music Fair or MU:CON SEOUL, hosted by KOCCA, which brings in international music scouts from around the world. James Minor, director of the large U.S. annual festival SXSW, has attended and handpicked his choices. After selections are made, the bands are designated for their international trips, including locations like SXSW and the Canadian Music Week for this tour; and for France’s Midem, Singapore’s Music Matters and international K-pop head-lined concerts, including K-Pop Night Out at SXSW.

For the SXSW event, Bernie Cho, the president of DFSB Kollective said while selecting bands, "I look for passion. But it is a business decision. As cool as flashy K-pop may be, the cold hard facts and figures tell us the American music market is marching to different beats. We are targeting what the U.S. market is listening to."

=== 2011, the first year ===
In March 2011, the first group of bands set out for SXSW in Austin, Texas. The three bands were: Vidulgi OoyoO, (electro-dance), Idiotape, (rock hybrid) and Galaxy Express (rock).

Prior to the tour, other South Korean bands had performed at SXSW, including YB and Seoul Electric Band in 2007, and Gong Myoung in 2009.

The 2K11 "Seoulsonic North American Tour" started on March 9, 2011, at the Canadian Music Week in Toronto, Canada, and held other shows, including the Knitting Factory in New York City and the Roxy in West Hollywood, California. Apollo 18 made additional stops in Texas, Louisiana, Arkansas and Oklahoma.

Also, in April 2011, a fifth band, EE (electronic performance art) became the first Korean act to perform at Coachella in Indio, California); not followed by another Korean act until 2016, when Epik High, was announced to play the festival.

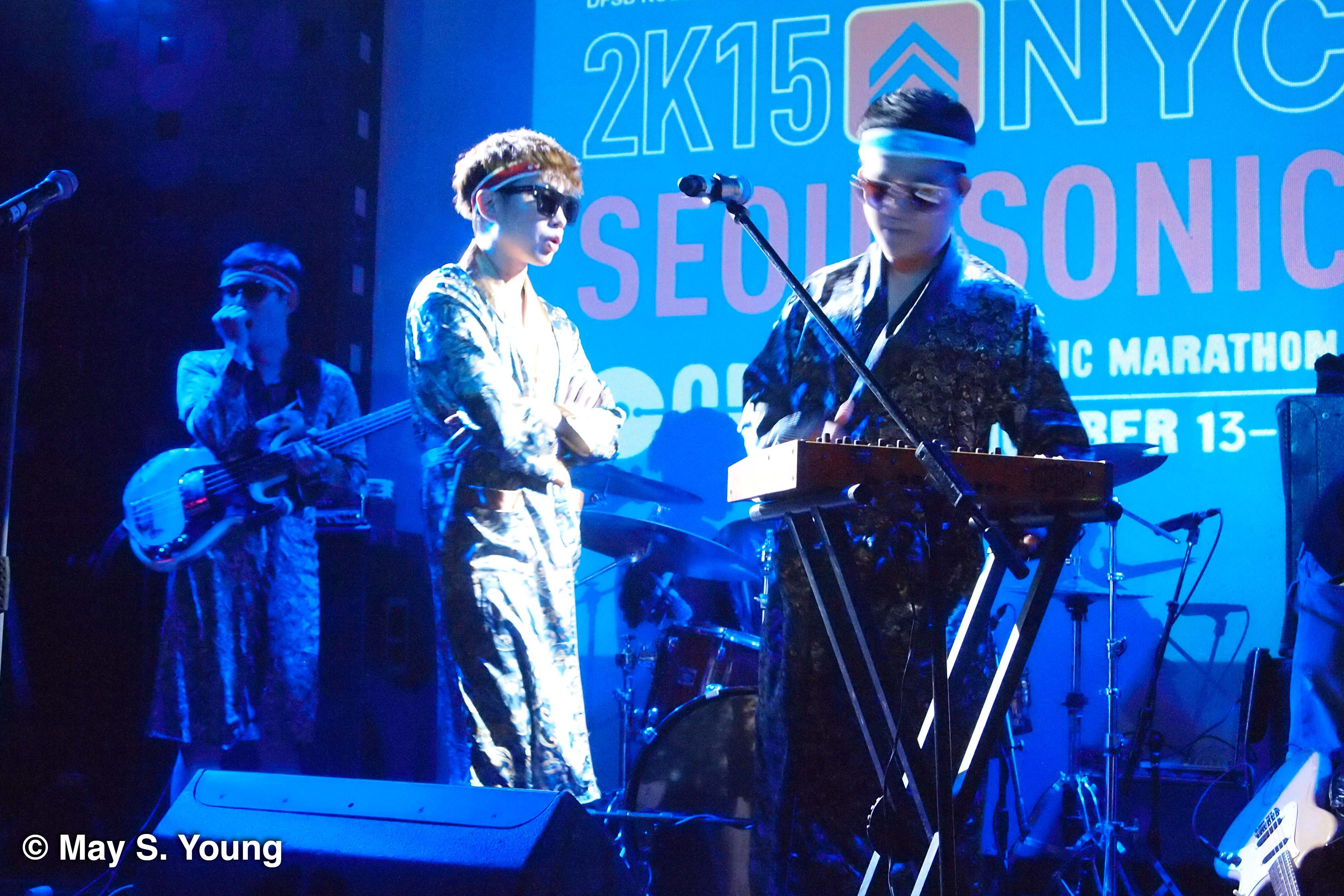
Sultan of the Disco, 2K15 Seoulsonic NYC, CMJ Music Marathon

== Yearly line-ups 2012 - 2015 ==
- 2012 - Yellow Monsters, 3rd Line Butterfly, Crying Nut
- 2013 - 3rd Line Butterfly, Galaxy Express, Goonam, Lowdown 30, No Brain
- 2014 - Smacksoft, Big Phony, Glen Check, Rock 'N' Roll Radio, Love X Stereo, No Brain, Crying Nut, Jambinai
- 2015 - From the Airport, The Solutions, HEO, Big Phony, Victim Mentality, YB, WYM, Sultan of the Disco

== 2016 ==
2K16 scheduled to start at SXSW on March 18, 2016, at the Majestic Music Hall in Austin, with Neon Bunny, Guten Birds, Bye Bye Badman, HEO, Windy City, WYM.

== List of bands, genres, years ==
- Big Phony, indie folk (2014), (2015)
- Bye Bye Badman, Brit-pop (2016)
- Crying Nut, punk/rock (2012), (2014)
- EE, electronic performance art (2015)
- From the Airport, electro, electronic rock (2015)
- Galaxy Express, garage rock (2011), (2013)
- Glen Check, electronic (2014)
- Goonam, retro-indie rock (2013)
- Guten Birds, female post rock (2016)
- HEO, K-indie electronic rock (2015), (2016)
- Jambinai, post-rock/world music (2014)
- Idiotape, electro rock (2011)
- Love X Stereo, electro rock (2014)
- Lowdown 30, blues rock (2013)
- No Brain, punk rock (2013), (2014), (2015)
- Neon Bunny, electro-pop (2016)
- Rock 'N' Roll Radio, rock (2014)
- Smacksoft, post punk (2014)
- The Solutions, alternative brit-pop (2015)
- Sultan of the Disco, soul/funk (2015)
- 3rd Line Butterfly, rock (2012), (2013)
- YB, rock (2015)
- Victim Mentality, glam metal band (2015)
- Vidulgi OoyoO, shoegaze rock (2011)
- Windy City, reggae (2016)
- WYM, electro-pop producer (2015), (2016)
- Yellow Monsters, punk (2012)

== Reception ==
In 2014, KoreAm said, "The Seoulsonic Showcase at Icenhauer’s proved the strength and diversity of Korean music at SXSW."

In 2015, The Austin Chronicle said, "Seoulsonic is different from the previous night's K-pop Night Out, in the sense that it focuses on the less bubbly and less commercially viable corners of the Korean music industry." Also in 2015, KoreAm said, "several underground rock bands showed how South Korean music is more than just catchy K-pop tunes.

== See also ==
- K-Pop Night Out at SXSW
