= The Solutions =

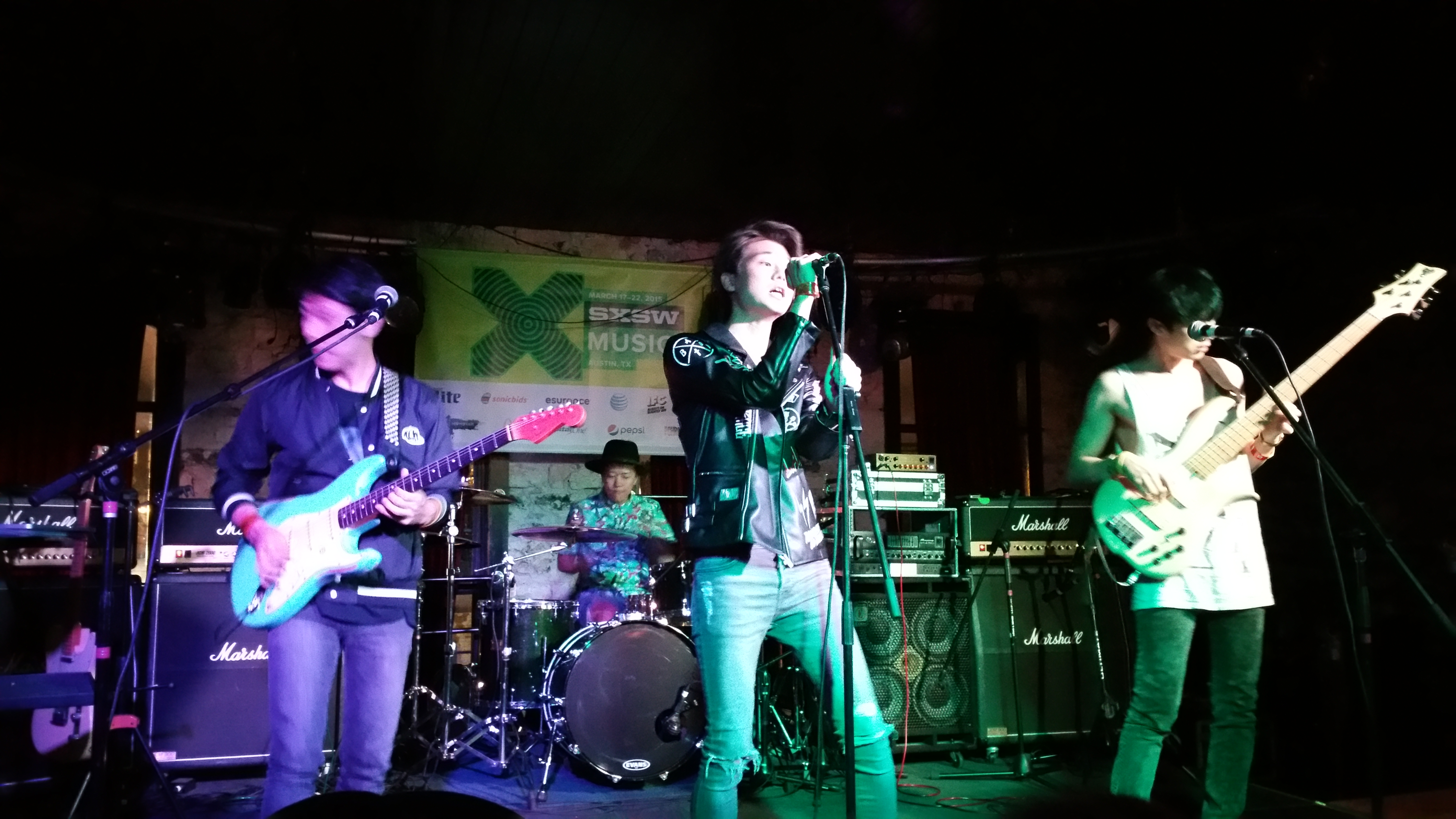
- Seoulsonic, 2015

Background information
- Also known as: 솔루션스
- Origin: South Korea
- Genre: indie rock
- Years active: 2012–present
- Label: Happy Robot Records
- Members: Kwon Oh-kyung; Naru; Park Sol; Park Han-sol

The Solutions (솔루션스) is a South Korean indie rock band under the label Happy Robot Records. They originally debuted as a duo with Naru and Park Sol in June 2012 with the digital single "Sounds of the Universe" from their self-titled album The Solutions. Kwon Oh-kyung and Park Han-sol joined the band for their second album Movements in 2014, which included the work of Grammy award-winning recording engineer and producer Jimmy Douglass.

The group takes influences from 90s British pop, American alternative, and contemporary Japanese pop music, with most of their songs written in English despite having no native English speaking members. They have toured Asia, Europe and the U.S. and are popular in the indie scene in Hongdae, Seoul.

== History ==
=== 2012–2018:The Solutions, Movements, formation and touring ===
The band was formed in 2012 by frontman and lead singer Park Sol and guitarist Naru. Both had previously been solo performers. Naru, a music producer and singer songwriter, had released two modern rock genre solo albums, Jaga Dangchak in 2008 and Yet in 2010. Park Sol was an already well-known indie musician, with a 2010 album The Song is You, and was a singer songwriter for the 2011 music competition show Superstar K 3. Park Sol has described Naru, who usually arranges the music, as the leader between the two. They started writing and performing most of their songs in the English language, as the lyrics seemed to work better than Korean lyrics; but they have questioned their abilities to sing well in English. Naru spent five years as a child in America and later studied English in Korea, and Park Sol learned it while traveling abroad for a year when he was twenty. Naru said he started playing guitar in his teens and writing songs at twenty, and says the two of them work hard at music, as they had a later start than some musicians.

The band toured Asian countries, Europe and the U.S., and performed solo and at indie festivals in Hongdae. In 2015, they played at the fifth Seoulsonic annual concert which introduced South Korean musicians to U.S. audiences at the SXSW music festival. They headlined the 2017 Pentaport Rock Festival along with other South Korean and foreign acts, including rock bands Bastille and 5 Seconds of Summer, and have performed at Japan's Summer Sonic Festival and Spain's Primavera Sound.

Their first album The Solutions was released by the original duo, Naru and Park Sol in 2012, and followed by a second album, Movements, with all four members in 2014. They created the song "All That You Want" for the music project SM Station's 2017-2018 Season 2.

=== 2019–present:Signature ===
They released their third studio album Signature on July 29, 2019, which includes the title track "In My City". They also released an EP titled "Load" featuring the title track "Dance With Me" on June 2, 2020.

== Musical process, style, and influences ==
Naru described their sound in 2014 to Hilde Heyvaert, a Never Was magazine writer, while playing in Liège, Belgium, "We experiment mixing our favorite sounds from the 80s, 90s and contemporary music. Using both guitars and synthesisers, which I like both. We are experimenting with mixing them, without making it sound complex. We want people to be able to just listen, not hearing all that complexity. It’s pretty difficult to do that." Heyvaert's description said, "this band was unintentionally playing music that could happily be a soundtrack to a rock-and-roll-loving dieselpunk lifestyle."

In an interview with NoHo Arts District, Los Angeles reporter Caroline McElroy, for NoHoArtsDistrict.com, in October 2016, while playing at the Hotel Café, they detailed the band's songwriting process, which varies, sometimes starting with one member's contributing a completed song, and at others, with the group creating a song "organically" together, with Naru arranging the final product. They said they are influenced by "80s, new wave and alternative music to EDM acts such as Radiohead and Smashing Pumpkins".

The band published a book in 2015, with the encouragement of an interested publishing company, Do it, Just Do It, about each members' musical journey. It includes Park Sol's story of listening to Nirvana in middle school and Naru's working at a factory job to save to buy a guitar.

== Members ==
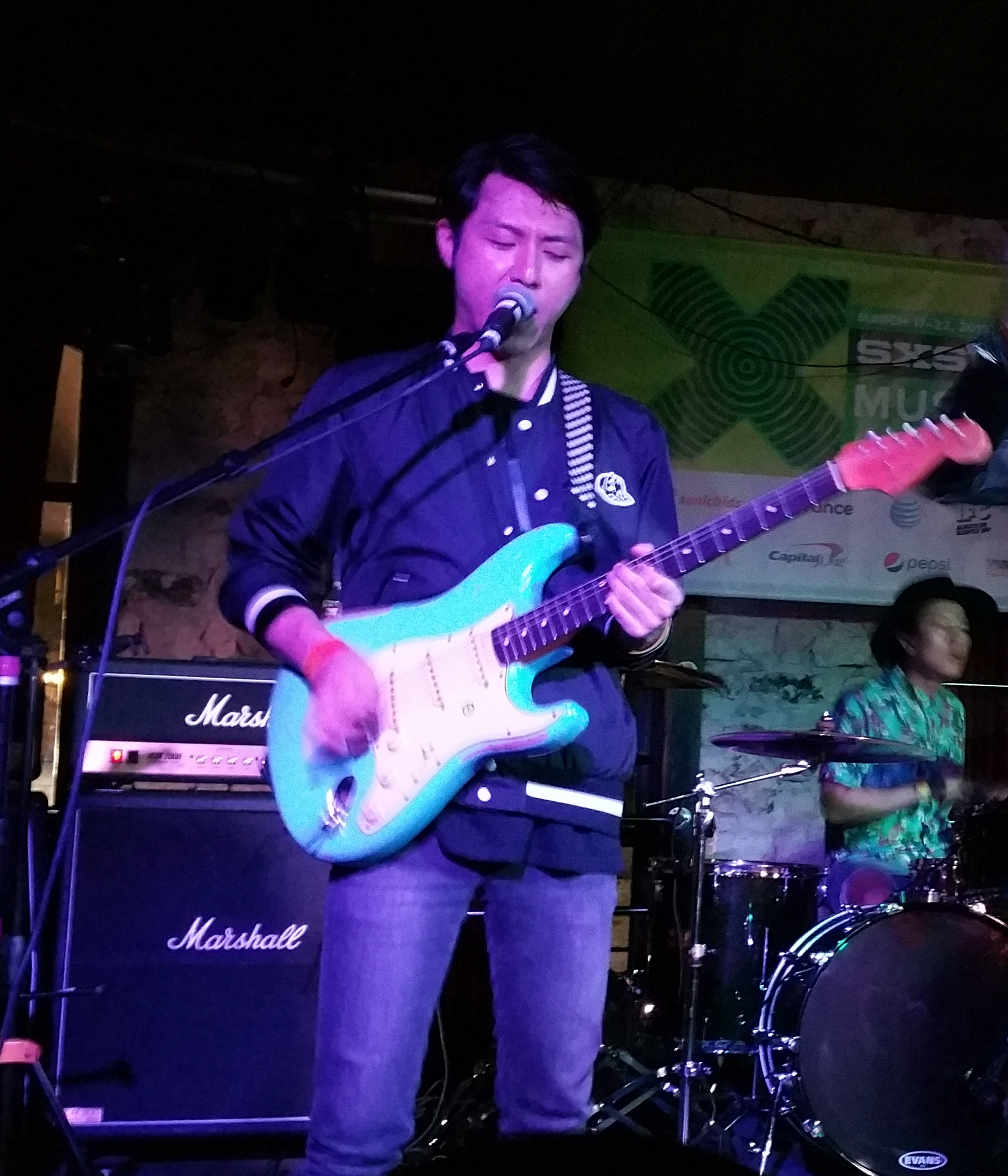
Naru

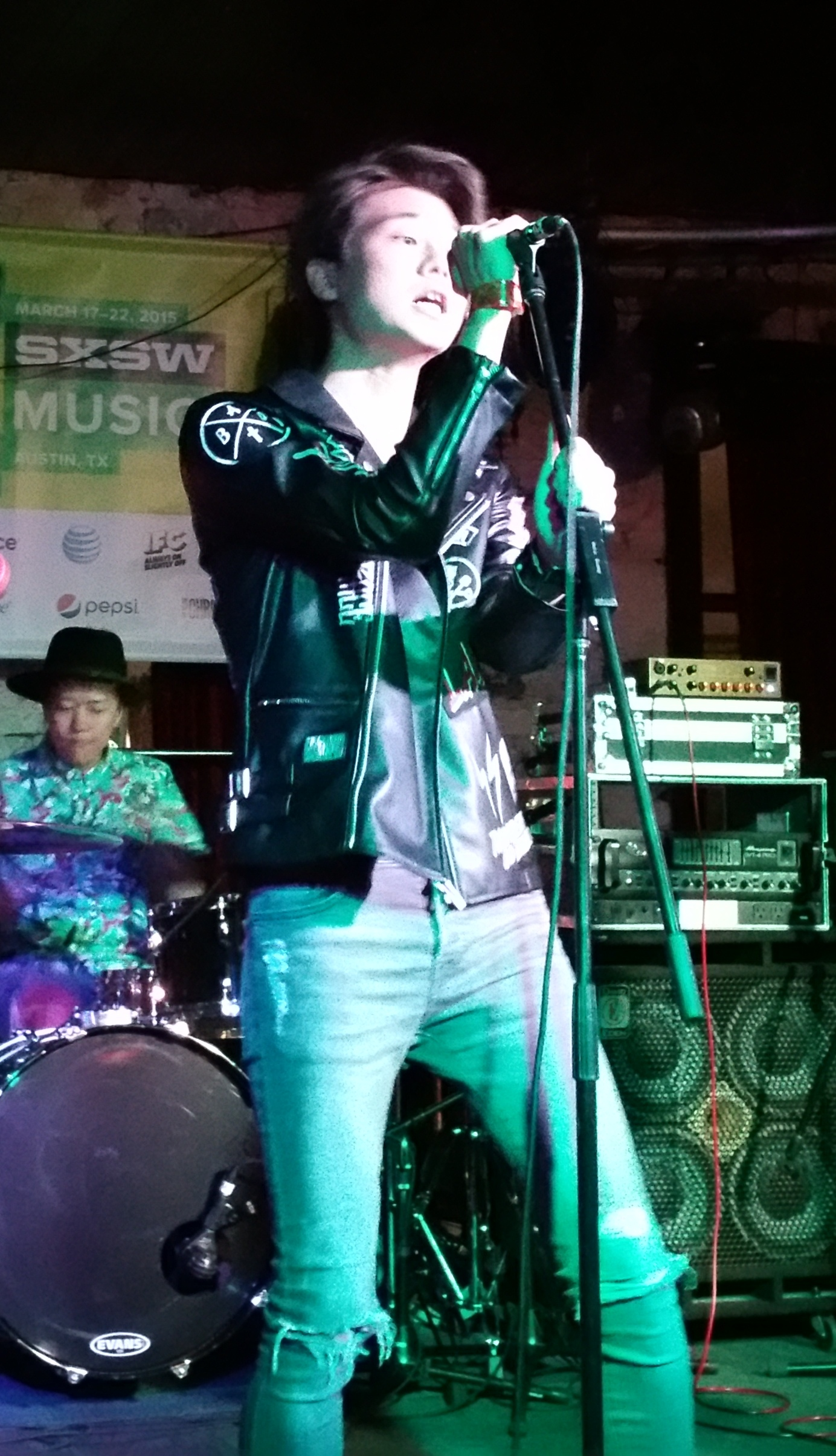
Park Sol

The Solutions started as a duo
- Kwon Oh-kyung (관오경) – bass
- Naru (나루), birthname: Kang Kyung-tae (강경태) – guitar, backing vocals
- Park Sol (박솔) – lead vocals
- Park Han-sol (박한솔) – drums

== Discography ==
=== Albums ===
Title	Album details	Peak chart positions
Title	Album details	KOR
The Solutions	Released: August 30, 2012; Formats: CD, digital download	—
Movements	Released: May 16, 2014; Formats: CD, digital download	—
Signature	Released: July 29, 2019; Formats: CD, digital download	—

=== EPs ===
Title	Album details	Peak chart positions
Title	Album details	KOR
No Problem!	Released: June 8, 2015; Formats: CD, digital download	—
Thumbs Up	Released: September 8, 2017; Formats: CD, digital download	77
Load	Released: June 3, 2020; Formats: CD, digital download	—

=== Singles ===
Title	Year	Peak chart positions		Album
Title	Year	KOR	US World	Album
"Sounds of the Universe"	2012	—	—	—N/a
"Talk, Dance, Party for Love"	2012	—	—	—N/a
"Stage"	2015	—	—	—N/a
"Ticket To The Moon"	2016	—	—	—N/a
"All That You Want" (당신이 원하는 모든 것)	2017	—	19	SM Station Season 2
"Love Again"	2017	—	—	—N/a
"Love Again (Japanese Ver.)"	2018	—	—	—N/a
"Mood For Love"	2018	—	—	—N/a

=== Collaborations ===
Title	Year	Other artist(s)
"Beautiful"	2016	Kei (LOVELYZ)

== Awards and nominations ==
=== Mint Paper Awards ===
Year	Nominee / work	Award	Result
2012	The Solutions	Rookie of The Year	Won
