= Timeline of K-pop at Billboard =

Current Billboard logo.

Timeline of K-pop at Billboard is a history of K-pop as recorded by Billboard, Billboard charts and Billboard K-Town, an online magazine column, presented by Billboard on its Billboard.com site, that reports on K-pop music; artists, concerts, chart information and news events. It is followed by later history at Timeline of K-pop at Billboard in the 2020s.

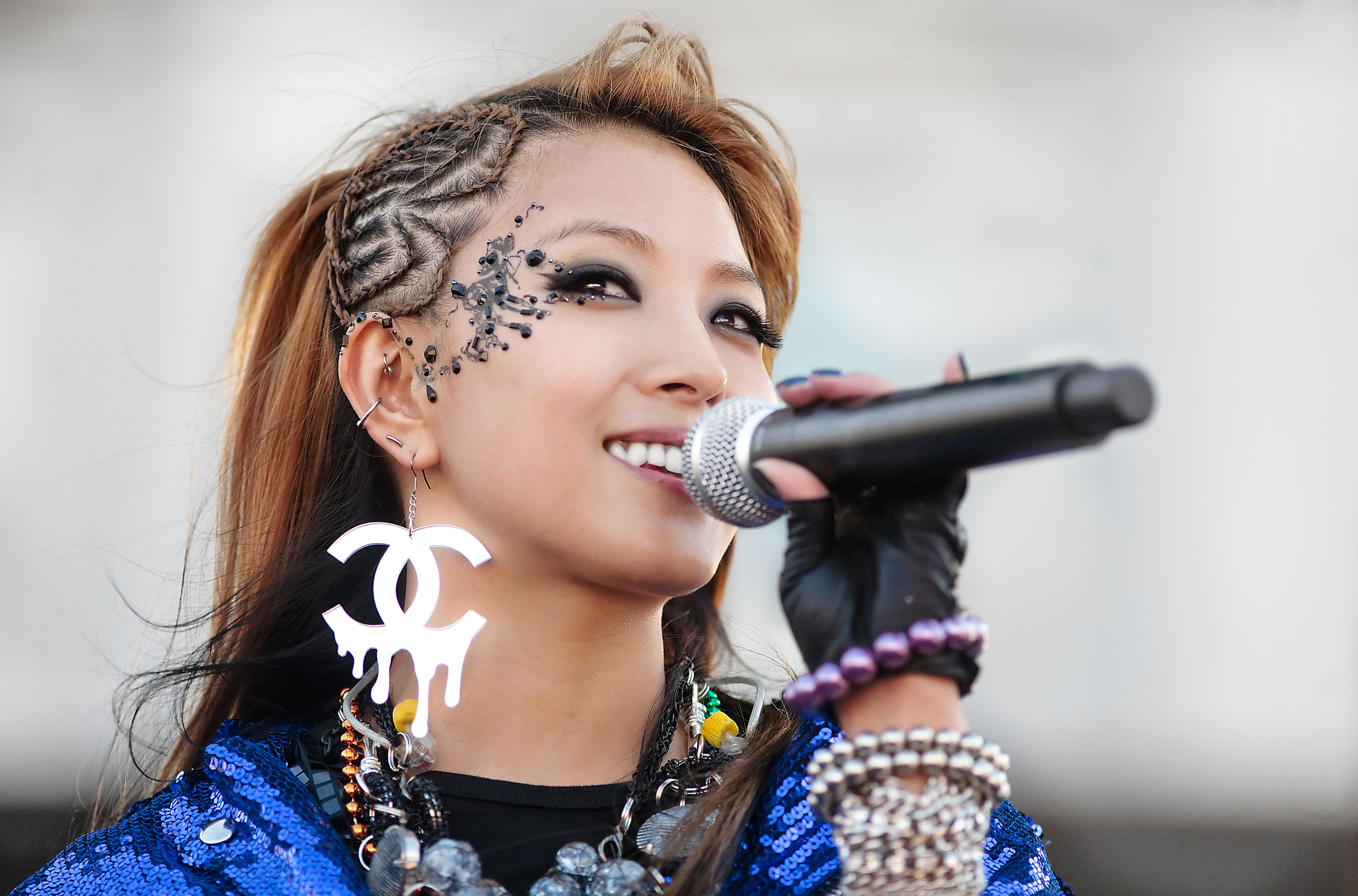
BoA performing at San Francisco Pride, June 28, 2009, was the first K-pop artist to chart on the Billboard 200 with her album BoA, chart dated April 4, 2009.

== Legend ==
Type codes
T	Event type
B	Billboard picks
C	Concert events
CH	Chart information
F	Fan picks
IN	Industry news
K	K-Town column launched
MT	Movie or television related
O	Other

Location codes
Event location	L
South Korea	KR
United States	US
Other	O

== 1998 ==
T	M	D	Event	Details	L
B	Jan+		K-pop in Billboard top 1998 songs (2018 selections)	#91, J. Y. Park's "Honey", did not chart on Billboard charts, but became "an instant K-pop classic", covered over the years by countless others.	US

== 1999 ==
T	M	D	Event	Details	L
B	Jan+		K-pop in Billboard top 1999 songs (2019 selections)	#37, Lee Jung-hyun's "Wa", a techno introduction to K-pop and a classic of K-pop's first-generation; and #70, H.O.T.'s "I Yah!", a social protest song infused with "metal and hard rock elements" by the group that was considered the first K-pop idol group. Neither song charted on the Billboard charts.	US
O	Oct	9	1st use of term "K-pop" in Billboard magazine	In the article, "S. Korea To Allow Some Japanese Live Acts", a report from Seoul correspondent Cho Hyun-jin, in a quote of music producer Kim Chang-Hwan's.	US

== 2000 ==
T	M	D	Event	Details	L
IN	Mar	25	K-pop Concert Promoters Association formed	A 50-member trade body and lobby group established to modernize the local concert industry, no longer a "mom-and-pop shop", according to its first president, Lee Jong-hyeon of promoter Live Entertainment.	KR
IN	Nov	18	1st licensing deal between South Korean and Japanese record labels	S.M. Entertainment, home of K-pop artists H.O.T., S.E.S. and others, with Japan's biggest independent label Avex Trax, as South Korean government starts lifting ban on Japanese pop music (as of June 2000, restrictions on recording sales, with no Japanese lyrics, had been lifted).	KR

== 2001 ==
T	M	D	Event	Details	L
IN	Jun		Channel V Korea launched	A 24-hour music video channel, jointly owned by Hong Kong-based Asian TV network Channel V and South Korean record label DoReMi; a time of increased regional popularity for Korean pop and hip-hop groups in China, Taiwan and Hong Kong.	O
IN	Jul	1	MTV Korea launched	A 24-hour MTV channel in South Korea, Asia's second-biggest music market; with Korean pop a priority, as local consumers were purchasing it at nearly four times the rate of international pop.	KR

== 2002 ==
T	M	D	Event	Details	L
IN	Dec	28	South Korean music industry investigation	Allegations included bribery and corruption, specifically chart fixing, payola and "inappropriate" talent lobbying. Popular artists by this time include Shinhwa, H.O.T. and BoA.	KR

== 2003 ==
T	M	D	Event	Details	L
IN	Feb	8	Declining album sales	S.M. Entertainment and the Recording Industry Association of Korea (RIAK) cite industry file sharing as a problem, while some industry insiders and fans account it to a stale product. After H.O.T.'s break-up, its splinter members, Kangta, Moon Hee-joon and jtL remained popular.	KR
C	May	17	Major Seoul concert against music piracy	Olympic Park concert called "F*, standing for "Freedom, Fever and Future", with 30,000 fans and including artists BoA, Kangta, g.o.d and Drunken Tiger; predecessor was the "Dream Concert", started in 1995.	KR
IN	June		Group creates music videos for mobile-phone service	JYP Entertainment's Noel partners with SK Telecom for the launch of their mobile multimedia EV-Do, including music videos, ring tones and other services.	KR

== 2004 ==
T	M	D	Event	Details	L
IN	Jan+		Physical sales further decline, digital sales rise	According to the Music Industry Association of Korea, physical musical shipments fell to $150 million U.S. dollars, while the Korean Association of Phonogram Producers reported digital sales of $185 million U.S. dollars and rising.	KR

== 2005 ==
T	M	D	Event	Details	L
IN	Jun	11	Sales increase in Japan	Japanese record business now views "K-pop as a distinct musical genre", with last two years seeing increase in popularity.	O
IN	Aug	20	Digital music growth in South Korea	A live Seoul concert for solo artist Rain was made available to mobile phone operators.	KR

== 2006 ==
T	M	D	Event	Details	L
IN	Jun	27	MTV K launched in U.S.	A satellite TV channel for Korean Americans which went defunct in 2007. It was revamped in 2010 with major K-pop content and organized some K-pop concerts in New York City, but by May 2017, had ceased operations.	US
C	Aug	19	Major South Korean music festival debut	Pentaport Rock Festival 2006, first major rock festival since the "1999 Tri-port Festival" and which included K-pop, like Psy.	KR

== 2007 ==
T	M	D	Event	Details	L
B	Jun	16	1st artist on Billboard magazine cover	J. Y. Park, artist and producer, featured in the June 16 edition of Billboard, a special advertisement cover for artists or companies selected by the magazine.	US

== 2008 ==
T	M	D	Event	Details	L
MT	Apr		Artist debuts in Hollywood film	Rain, Speed Racer	US
MT	May	5	Artist guests on U.S. late-night talk show	Rain, The Colbert Report, May 5, 2008 episode. After being beaten by Rain for the Time 100 people's choice award several times, host Stephen Colbert challenged him to a dance-off which was aired on the show.	US
C	Dec	6	1st artist performs at iHeartRadio music event	BoA, Anaheim's KIIS-FM Jingle Ball concert, Honda Center.	US

== 2009 ==
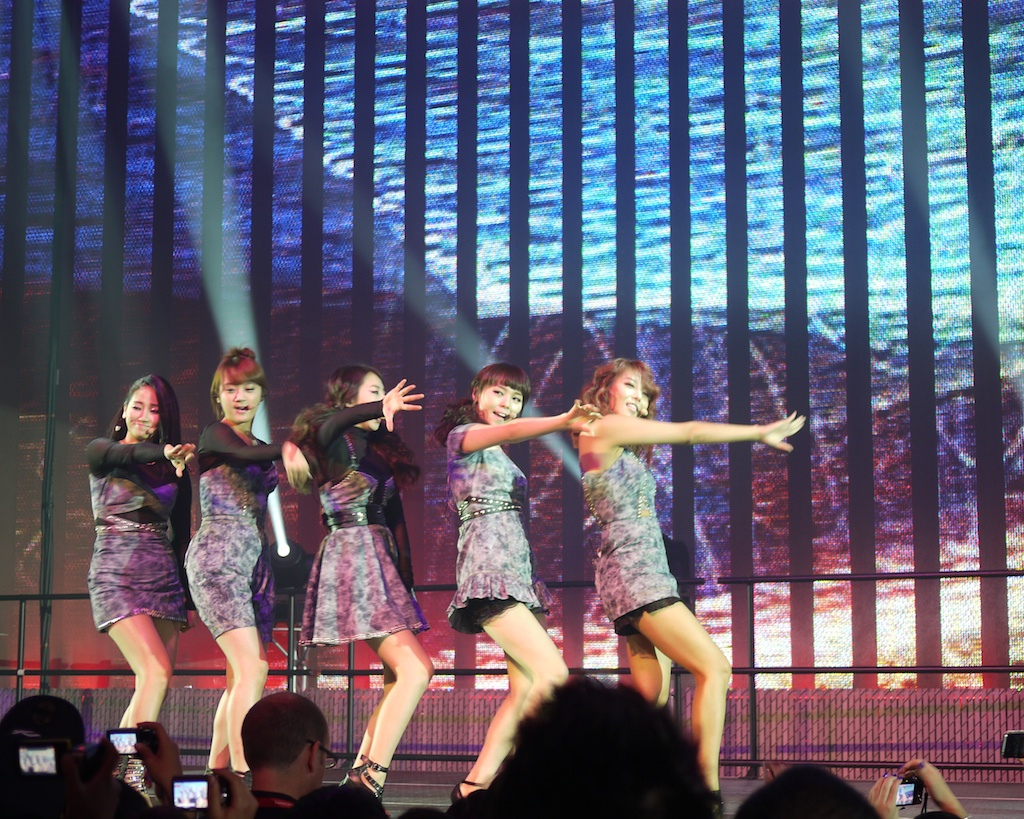
Wonder Girls performing in Seattle, September 3, 2010.

T	M	D	Event	Details	L
IN	Mar		1st direct distribution on iTunes	DFSB Kollective signed worldwide distribution deals with a range of South Korean music acts, including Epik High, Yoon Mi-rae and Drunken Tiger.	KR
CH	Apr	4	1st album on Billboard 200 chart	#127, BoA, BoA	US
C	Jun+		1st opener for U.S. artist concert tour	Wonder Girls for Jonas Brothers World Tour 2009 North America leg of tour.	US
MT	Jul	20	1st performance on U.S. TV show	Wonder Girls' "Nobody" on The Wendy Williams Show	US
MT	Nov		Artist with lead role in German-American film	Rain, Ninja Assassin	US
CH	Oct	31	1st single on Billboard Hot 100 chart	Wonder Girls' "Nobody" debuted at No. 76.	US
MT	Dec	9	1st performance on US dance competition TV show	Wonder Girls "Nobody" on So You Think You Can Dance	US

== 2010 ==
T	M	D	Event	Details	L
CH	Mar	27	First album on Billboard World Albums chart	Epik High's Epilogue debuts at No.13.	US
O	Aug	6	Artist/producer/CEO receives global leadership award in Atlanta	J.Y. Park, Usher's New Look's World Leadership Awards, "Global Ambassador of Youth Award", shared with Michelle Nunn and Hital Muraj, among eight recipients which included former U.S. President Bill Clinton.	US
CH	Sep	4	Tour on Billboard Hot Tours top 10	#10, SM Town Live '10 World Tour, Los Angeles's Staples Center, grossed $1.1 million with 15,015 tickets sold, placing them on the Billboard Hot Tour list on their boxscore report for October 9.	US
B	Sep	23	1st artists on Billboard's annual showcase "21 under 21"	#16, Wonder Girls, Birthdates (ages, at the time): Sunye: August 12, 1989 (age 21); Yenny: May 26, 1989 (age 21); Sohee: June 27, 1992 (age 18); Yubin: October 4, 1988 (age 21); Lim: September 1, 1992 (age 18)	US
F	Sep	26	Group voted "Best Mashup Monday of 2011" Billboard poll	#1, Wonder Girls cover of B.o.B and Bruno Mars's "Nothin' on You", winning 65% of poll votes with 32 videos entered, over #2 Greyson Chance, #3 Hanson, #4 James Blunt and #5 Grace Potter.	US
C	Nov	26	1st artists perform live at Billboard Studio	JYJ at Billboard's New York studio, from their album The Beginning "Ayyy Girl" and "Empty"	US
F	Dec	8	Artists on Billboard Readers' Poll Your Fave Album Of 2010	#5, JYJ, The Beginning, between Taylor Swift, #4 and Katy Perry, #6.	US

== 2011 ==
T	M	D	Event	Details	L
CH	Jun	30	1st artist on Social 50 chart	2PM debuts at No. 35 following the release of their album Hands Up and the music video of their song "Hands Up".	US
CH	Aug	25	Korea K-Pop Hot 100 chart launched	Sistar's song "So Cool" was the first to top the chart.	US
B	Sep	27	Artist on Billboard annual showcase "21 under 21" (2nd time)	#17, HyunA, birthdate June 6, 1992 (age, at the time, 19).	US
O	Oct	11	Article on artist going to military	Rain joins Republic of Korea Army	KR
B	Oct	24	1st article by 1st Billboard K-pop columnist	"K-Pop Hits Madison Square Garden at SMTown Live", Jeff Benjamin's "on the scene" coverage of a SM Town Live '10 World Tour concert at Madison Square Garden, including the press conference.	US
C	Nov	25- 26	"2011 Billboard K-Pop Masters, presented by MGM Grand" Las Vegas	2 nights of concerts in MGM Grand Garden Arena, organized by Billboard Korea. The line-up included TVXQ, 4Minute, G.NA, MBLAQ, Sistar, Beast, Shinee, and Brown Eyed Girls.	US

== 2012 ==
T	M	D	Event	Details	L
IN	Jan- Jun		South Korean music industry gross report	Estimated by Billboard, around $3.4 billion for the first six months of 2012, a 27.8% increase from the same period the prior year.	KR
MT	Jan	31	1st girl group performs on U.S. late-night talk show	Girls' Generation, "The Boys" on Late Show with David Letterman	US
MT	Feb	1	1st artists perform on U.S. morning talk show	Girls' Generation, "The Boys" on Live! with Kelly	US
MT	Feb	2	Artists premier TeenNick film	Wonder Girls, The Wonder Girls, which included their song "The DJ Is Mine" featuring School Gyrls.	US
CH	Mar	17	2nd album on Billboard 200 chart	#150 BigBang, Alive (chart dated March 17).	US
CH	May	12	1st #1 on Billboard World Albums chart	Girls' Generation-TTS's debut EP "Twinkle" tops the World Albums chart. The album also charts on the Billboard 200.	US
F	Aug		1st YouTube video goes viral	Psy, "Gangnam Style", released on July 15, "hilarious" video becomes popular with media and celebrities, going viral in August.	O
MT	Aug	22	Artist guests on U.S. morning talk show	Psy, Big Morning Buzz Live, performs "Gangnam Style" with hosts and crew.	US
CH	Aug	23	Korea K-Pop Hot 100 1st "Top 10 Songs of the Past Year"	#1 IU, "You & I", #2 Davichi "Don't Say Goodbye" #3 Lyn "To Turn Back Hands of Time" #4 Trouble Maker "Trouble Maker" #5 T-ara "Cry Cry", etc.	US
CH	Aug	31	1st #1 on Social 50 chart	Psy, (chart dated September 8), the chart ranks the most popular artists on YouTube, Vevo, Facebook, Twitter and MySpace.	US
MT	Sep	6	1st artist performs on MTV Video Music Award show	Psy, 2012 MTV Video Music Awards, performs "Gangnam Style" with presenter Kevin Hart.	US
MT	Sep	11	Artist guests on U.S. variety comedy talk show	Psy, The Ellen DeGeneres Show, performs "Gangnam Style" with Ellen DeGeneres and Britney Spears.	US
MT	Sep	14	Artist guests on U.S. morning talk show	Psy, The Today Show, performs "Gangnam Style" and interview with hosts.	US
CH	Sep	15	1st #1 on Bubbling Under Hot 100	Psy, "Gangnam Style" (peaked on chart dated September 15). The chart acts as an extension of the Hot 100 singles chart, ranking tracks just below the top 100 slots, based on sales, radio airplay and streaming data.	US
CH	Sep	15	1st artist tops iTunes Top Songs chart	#1, Psy, "Gangnam Style" (chart dated September 15).	US
MT	Sep	15	1st artist guests on Saturday Night Live show	Psy, performs "Gangnam Style", in a cameo with cast.	US
MT	Sep	17	Artist guests on U.S. entertainment show	Psy, Extra, performs "Gangnam Style" with hosts.	US
B	Sep	17	Artist on Billboard annual showcase "21 under 21" (3rd time)	#15, IU birthdate May 16, 1993 (age, at the time, 19).	US
C	Sep	22	2nd artist performs at iHeartRadio music event	Psy, iHeartRadio Music Festival, "Gangnam Style"	US
CH	Oct	6	1st artist hits #2 on Billboard Hot 100	Psy, "Gangnam Style" (peaked on chart dated October 6).	US
C	Oct	17	1st U.S. K-pop convention and concert	KCON 2012, October 16, convention and concert, Verizon Wireless Amphitheatre Irvine, California	US
CH	Oct	20	1st artist tops Billboard Hot Rap Songs chart	#1, Psy, "Gangnam Style" (chart dated October 20).	US
B	Nov	3	Artist on Billboard magazine cover (2nd time)	Psy, "Gangnam Style"	US
MT	Nov	18	1st artist performs on American Music Awards show	Psy, American Music Awards of 2012, his "Gangnam Style" and, along with MC Hammer, that artist's "2 Legit 2 Quit"; calling it the "highlight" of his year in music.	US
MT	Nov	29	1st music on U.S. musical comedy-drama television series	Glee cast perform Psy's "Gangnam Style".	US
C	Dec	3	1st artist performs 2nd time at iHeartRadio music event	Psy, Los Angeles' KIIS-FM Jingle Ball, "Gangnam Style".	US
F	Dec	18	1st yearly top YouTube video and 1st song and artist on YouTube Rewind	#1 Psy, "Gangnam Style", YouTube Top Trending Video, and Psy guest appearance on "Rewind YouTube Style 2012", a mash-up of Psy's "Gangnam Style" and "Carly Rae Jepsen's "Call Me Maybe" on the annual series of most popular videos;.	O
B	Dec	21	1st yearly round-up "20 Best K-Pop Songs of 2012"	#1 Infinite "The Chaser", #2 Sistar "Alone", #3 Naul "Memory of the Wind", #4 2NE1 "I Love You", #5 BigBang "Bad Boy", etc.	US
MT	Dec	31	1st performance at NYC New Year's Eve celebration	Psy, Dick Clark's New Year's Rockin' Eve, performed "Gangnam Style", along with MC Hammer, Noh Hong-chul and Yoo Jae-suk.	US

== 2013 ==
T	M	D	Event	Details	L
K	Jan	29	K-Town column launched and 1st K-Town article	Welcome video by Girls' Generation and 1st K-Town article: "Meet INFINITE: Video Q&A With the Rising K-Pop Superstars".	US
C	Mar	13	1st artists at SXSW	K-Pop Night Out at SXSW; with f(x), The Geeks, Guckkasten, No Brain, Yi Seung Yol, Jung Chang Shik, and Galaxy Express	US
O	March	29	1st RIAA certification	Psy, video single "Gangnam Style" receives multi-platinum (1 million sales units) X5, on March 29 and again on December 12, for the single.	US
CH	Apr	27	1st artist tops Streaming Songs chart	#1, Psy, "Gentleman", (chart dated April 27); later followed by "Gangnam Style" at #1 (chart dated May 25).	US
MT	May	19	1st artist wins a Billboard Music Award and appears on show	Psy, 2013 Billboard Music Awards, Top Streaming Song (Video), "Gangnam Style", for most watched music video of the year. He was nominated in five more of the total 45 categories, including "Top New Artist", "Top Streaming Artist", "Top Rap Artist", "Top Rap Song" and "Top Dance Song"; and participated in the show, introducing Chris Brown.	US
B	Jul	15	Billboard "Top 10 K-Pop Hits Post-Gangnam Style"	Psy "Gentleman", Girls' Generation "I Got a Boy", Hyuna "Ice Cream", G-Dragon "Crayon", G-Dragon "One of a Kind", G-Dragon "That XX", Girls' Generation "Oh!", Beast "Beautiful Night", Girls Generation "Flower Power", Kara "Pandora"	US
B	Sep	25	Artist on Billboard annual showcase "21 under 21" (4th time)	#20, Lee Hi birthdate September 23, 1996 (age, at the time, 17).	US
F	Nov	3	Music video wins 1st YouTube Music Awards	Girls' Generation's "I Got a Boy", wins the inaugural show's award for "Video of the Year"; Tiffany accepted the award at the New York City show.	US
CH	Dec		1st artists on Billboard's World Albums Artists Year End chart	G-Dragon, 9th Place, Coup d'Etat Pt. 1 and Pt. 2, and Shinee, 10th Place, The Misconceptions of Us and Everybody.	US
B	Dec	23	20 Best K-Pop Songs of 2013	#1 Exo "Growl", #2 MFBTY "The Cure", #3 f(x) "Rum Pum Pum Pum", #4 Cho Yong-pil "Bounce", #5 Taeyang "Ringa Linga", etc.	US

== 2014 ==
T	M	D	Event	Details	L
MT	Jan	27	Artists guest on U.S. dating game show filmed in Seoul	2NE1 teach The Bachelor cast dance moves to "I Am the Best" on the show, filmed in a Seoul mall.	US
CH	Mar	15	1st in top 100 on Billboard 200	#61, 2NE1, Crush; and 1st time two acts are on the chart on the same date, with Girls Generation, #110, Mr.Mr.	US
F	May	2	Artists top categories on Billboard Girl Group Week Readers' Poll	2NE1 #1 Favorite Girl Group Album Crush (write-in vote), #1 Most Fashionable Girl Group, #3 Most Promising New Girl Group; Orange Caramel #2 Most Underrated Girl Group; and Girls' Generation #2 Most Promising New Girl Group	US
CH	May	17	Korea K-Pop Hot 100 chart discontinued	Billboard chart's manager Gary Trust told K-pop news website KpopStarz that it was temporary, for adjustments.	US
CH	Jun	28	1st artist tops Billboard Twitter Top Tracks chart	#1, Psy, "Hangover"	US
C	Jun- Jul		2nd opener for U.S. artist concert tour	Crayon Pop, invited for the entire Lady Gaga's ArtRave: The Artpop Ball tour, opened June 26 – July 22, as their schedule allowed.	US
C	Jul	14	1st BTS U.S. solo concert	BTS, Troubadour nightclub, a 400-capacity venue; a surprise free concert for 200 fans, announced two days prior on Twitter.	US
MT	Aug		Song used in U.S.-focused commercial	2NE1's "I Am the Best" in Microsoft Surface Pro 3 ad.	US
MT	Aug		Artist stars in Hollywood film	Rain, The Prince	US
F	Aug	18	Billboard Fan Army Face-Off win (1st time)	#1, BigBang's VIPs, with 91% of the vote in the final round. #2 Thirty Seconds to Mars Echelon. Started on Aug. 7, over 20 million votes were cast.	US
CH	Sep	20	1st artists top Billboard Twitter Emerging Artists chart	#1, Infinite, "Last Romeo"	US
B	Sep	24	Artist on Billboard annual showcase "21 under 21" (5th time)	#19, Akdong Musician, Birthdates (ages, at the time): Lee Chan-hyuk: September 12, 1996 (age 18) and Lee Su-hyun: May 4, 1999 (age 15).	US
O	Oct	8	Top Billboard staff speaks at Seoul music conference	Janice Min, co-president and chief creative officer of Guggenheim Digital Media's entertainment group overseeing The Hollywood Reporter and Billboard, at Seoul International Music Fair (MU:CON SEOUL 2014).	KR
CH	Oct	11	1st non-Psy act tops Billboard World Digital Songs chart	#1, 2NE1's "I Am the Best", first charted on August 13, 2011, peaking on October 11, 2014, for the first time.	US
MT	Nov	14	Group guests on U.S. reality television show filmed in Seoul	BtoB judge America's Next Top Model contestants dancing to their "Beep Beep".	US
F	Dec	1	Psy's hit breaks YouTube view counter	"Gangnam Style" gets more than 2.15 billion views, forcing YouTube to upgrade to a 64-bit integer counter.	O
MT	Dec	5	Group performs on U.S. reality TV show filmed in Seoul	2NE1 on America's Next Top Model, perform "Crush" on runway stage.	US
B	Dec	11	1st Billboard yearly round-up "10 Best K-Pop Albums of 2014"	#1 2NE1 Crush, #2 Nell Newton's Apple, #3 IU A Flower Bookmark, #4 Seo Taiji Quiet Night, #5 HA:TFELT Me?, #6 Taeyang Rise, #7 B.A.P First Sensibility, #8 Epik High Shoebox, #9 CNBLUE Can't Stop, #10 Rain Rain Effect.	US
B	Dec	11	20 Best K-Pop Songs of 2014	#1 Beast "Good Luck", #2 Seo Taiji and IU "Sogyeokdong", #3 GD X Taeyang "Good Boy", #4 TVXQ "Something", #5 San E and Raina "A Midsummer Night's Sweetness", etc.	US
O	Dec		1st album on Rolling Stone year end list, "20 Best Pop Albums of 2014"	#6 2NE1 Crush	US
CH	Dec		1st album on Billboard World Albums (Year end) chart	#11 2NE1 Crush, the February 2014 release was the first K-pop year-end entry since the chart began in 1995.	US
IN	Jan-	Dec	Biggest year for K-pop concerts in America	2014, After a National Tax Service of South Korea 2013 report that the average annual income for Korean singers rose more than 72 percent, experts attributed it largely to growing overseas activities that generated more international album sales and tours.	US

== 2015 ==
T	M	D	Event	Details	L
C	Mar	29	Singer closes Miami's 2015 Ultra Music Festival with U.S. artists	CL performs her verses from Skrillex and Diplo's "Dirty Vibe", then raps in Korean, from her solo song "MTBD" on Crush, with Sean Combs performance of "It's All About the Benjamins".	US
CH	Apr	5	Largest album sales in U.S. to date	Exo Exodus sold 6,000 copies in the week ending April 5 (according to Nielsen); charting at No. 70 on Top Album Sales, No. 95 on Billboard 200, and No. 1 on World Albums (all charts dated April 18, 2015).	US
IN	Apr		South Korea in top 10 global music market rankings	2015, An IFPI report said South Korea's ranking had moved ahead of Brazil, at $266 million in trade value.	KR
MT	Apr		1st K-pop inspired U.S. TV show	Make It Pop on Nickelodeon in the U.S., stars three Asian leads, including Korean American Megan Lee, who said they wear one outfit, a plaid, red and white concept, which is like f(x)'s from their "Rum Pum Pum Pum" video.	US
C	Apr	18	Artists perform at Earth Day concert in U.S. capital city	Roy Kim sang John Lennon's "Imagine" and VIXX performed their K-pop songs at "Global Citizen 2015 Earth Day" in Washington, D.C., on the National Mall with American artists, including Fall Out Boy, Mary J. Blige, No Doubt, Train, Usher, and will.i.am.	US
C	May	28	Biggest North American tour since Wonder Girls World Tour	Epik High announced a six concert tour after sales of Shoebox, and increased it to 11 dates in Canada and the U.S., after a popular reception at SXSW 2015 in March.	US
IN	Jun	30	1st U.S. available music streaming service with full K-pop playlist	Apple Music, including special lists: Getting to Work Out for Girls: K-Pop, Fun Driving: K-Pop and Behind the Board: Brave Brothers.	US
C	Aug- Sep		Artist tours with U.S. artists	CL performed with Jack Ü in various cities during the Mad Decent Block Party 2015 US and Canadian tour, their songs "Dirty Vibe" and "Doctor Pepper", the later which CL wrote.	US
CH	Aug	11	1st group with three #1's on World Digital Songs chart	BigBang, #1 "Let's Not Fall in Love" (chart dated August 22), #1 "Bang Bang Bang" (chart dated June 20), and "Loser" (chart dated May 16); matching solo artist Psy's three number ones in the chart's five-year history.	US
F	Aug	19	Billboard Fan Army Face-Off win (2nd time)	#1 T-ara's Queens, with 3.4 million votes cast for them throughout the competition, defeating Beyoncé's Beyhive after a strong battle against One Direction's Directioners, resulting in smoothing over feelings with a trending global hashtag on Twitter, #WeLove1DandKpop.	US
O	Sep	18	1st article on artists at fashion show	New York Fashion Week, Sooyoung and Minho at the Coach presentation, Dara at Givenchy, Jessica Jung at Diane von Fürstenberg, and Sulli at Tory Burch.	US
CH	Oct	3	Tour on Billboard Hot Tours top 10	#10, BigBang's Made World Tour stop in Los Angeles's Staples Center, on their six-city North American tour, grossed $1.7 million for a sold-out show of 13,361, placing them on the Billboard Hot Tour list for the boxscores compiled for October 6–12.	US
CH	Oct	7	1st Girls' Generation soloist and Billboard #1	#1 World Albums chart, I (Taeyeon EP) which was released on October 7, 2015, and sold 2,000 copies in two days.	US
B	Oct	30	Artists on Billboard annual showcase "21 under 21" (6th time)	#18, Seventeen, Birthdates (ages, at the time): Choi Seungcheol, aka S.coups: August 8, 1995 (Age: 20); Yoon Jeonghan, aka Jeonghan: October 4, 1995 (Age: 20); Hong Jisoo, aka Joshua: December 30, 1995 (Age: 19); Wen Junhui, aka Jun: June 10, 1996 (Age: 19); Kwon Soonyoung, aka Hoshi: June 15, 1996 (Age: 19); Jeon Wonwoo, aka Wonwoo: July 17, 1996 (Age: 19); Lee Jihoon, aka Woozi: November 22, 1996 (Age: 18); Lee Seokmin, aka DK: February 18, 1997 (Age: 18); Kim Mingyu, aka Mingyu: April 6, 1997 (Age: 18); Xu Minghao, aka The8: November 7, 1997 (Age: 17); Boo Seungkwan, aka Seungkwan: January 16, 1998 (Age: 17); Hansol Vernon Choi, aka Vernon: February 18, 1998 (Age: 17); Lee Chan, aka Dino: February 11, 1999 (Age: 16).	US
O	Nov		1st African American in group	Girl group Rania adds new member Alexandra, an American rapper, whose black father is from Texas and white mother is from Kansas.	KR
MT	Nov	9	1st collaboration with Disney	Exo and Disney release "Light Saber", a song and music video for Star Wars: The Force Awakens.	US
O	Nov	22	2NE1 member begins U.S. solo debut	CL "Hello Bitches" single release.	US
CH	Dec		1st (2nd year) on World Albums Artists (Year end) chart	#7 Exo, for the chart (time period December 6, 2014 through November 28, 2015), and #8 on World Albums year end for Exodus.	US
CH	Dec	19	1st artist charts on Artist 100 chart	#88, Psy; the chart "combines radio airplay, sales data, streaming data and social media activity to rank the top 100 artists in America each week."	US
B	Dec	30	10 Best K-Pop Albums of 2015	#1 Wonder Girls Reboot, #2 f(x) 4 Walls, #3 Brown Eyed Girls Basic, #4 BTS The Most Beautiful Moment in Life, Part 2, #5 MFBTY WondaLand, #6 IU Chat-Shire, #7 Red Velvet The Red, #8 2PM No.5, #9 Seventeen 17 Carat, #10 TVXQ Rise as God	US
B	Dec	30	20 Best K-Pop Songs of 2015	#1 BigBang "Loser", #2 Taeyeon "I", #3 BTS "Run", #4 Zion.T and Crush "Just", #5 Keith Ape "It G Ma", etc.	US

== 2016 ==
T	M	D	Event	Details	L
MT	Apr	5	1st review of K-drama OST releases	Descendants of the Sun: Yoon Mi-rae "Always", Chen and Punch "Everytime", Davichi "This Love", Gummy "You Are My Everything", Kim Na-young featuring Mad Clown "Once Again", K.Will "Talk Love", Lyn "With You", and SG Wannabe "By My Side". In addition, in February and March, these songs were among the top 10 YouTube K-pop videos viewed in the U.S. and internationally. Again, in May, two later releases, Xia "How Can I Love You" and MC the Max "Wind Beneath Your Wings" were in the top 10 YouTube K-pop videos viewed internationally.	US
CH	Apr	9	2nd artists chart on Artist 100 chart	#45 Got7, a month after releasing Flight Log: Departure, and besting Psy's #88 in 2015.	US
MT	Apr	9	U.S. celebrities film South Korea TV special, feature on music video	Conan O'Brien and Steven Yeun, Conan In Korea TBS special, and performance on Park Jin-young's "Fire" music video with Park Ji-min, Wonder Girls and Twice, which aired on Conan's YouTube channel the same day.	KR
C	Apr	17- 24	1st major South Korean act performs at Coachella	Epik High	US
IN	May	3	Concert growth outside East Asia	Reported by kickstarter website MyMusicTaste.com for the approximate period between 2013 and 2016; East Asia still led, with tapering numbers, but North America, South America and Europe were showing consistent growth; with most concerts abroad in Japan, China and the U.S.	O
F	May	12	1st group with Twitter emoji	BTS, a top K-pop Twitter presence and Twitter global music trend of 2015. It ran through June for a global contest tracking the group's best fans.	US
C	May	24- 25	1st review of Canadian K-pop concert	Toronto Kpop Con, performances by VIXX, Got7, GFriend, and Day6.	O
CH	Aug	27	Fastest group to hit World Digital Songs chart	Blackpink #1 Boombayah, #2 Whistle, just after their debut, making them only the third group to hold the top two positions after Psy and BigBang.	US
F	Aug		Billboard Fan Army Face-Off win (3rd time), 2nd time for one group	#1 T-ara's Queens, 2nd year win, with about 1.8 million votes cast for them throughout the competition, defeating Thirty Seconds to Mars The Echelon in the final round.	US
MT	Sep	6	1st U.S. TV show, based on South Korean TV show, films with K-pop group in Seoul	Better Late Than Never Episode 3 featured cast members William Shatner, Henry Winkler, George Foreman, Terry Bradshaw and Jeff Dye meeting with Girls' Generation's Yuri, Hyoyeon, Sunny, and Tiffany and learning the choreography to their 2009 song Gee.	US
O	Sep	8	1st review of South Korean fashion show	Concept Korea, at New York Fashion Week, with designers Yohanix, KimmyJ, and Greedilous; with K-pop music including arrangements of Baauer's "Temple" featuring M.I.A. and G-Dragon, and GD X Taeyang's Good Boy.	US
MT	Sep	15	2nd solo artist performs on late-night talk show	CL, "Lifted" on The Late Late Show with James Corden.	US
CH	Oct	12	1st female soloist charts on Billboard Hot 100	#94, CL's English language "Lifted" debut (chart dated October 22).	US
CH	Oct	17	1st group tops Social 50 chart	#1, BTS, (chart dated October 29); chart ranks the most active and popular artists on leading social networking sites. Psy topped previously as a solo artist.	US
CH	Oct	17	1st act with three albums on the Billboard 200 chart	BTS, The Most Beautiful Moment in Life, Part 2 (#171, December 2015), The Most Beautiful Moment in Life: Young Forever (#107, May 2016), Wings (top K-pop album to date at #26, October 29, 2016).	US
B	Dec	22	10 Best K-Pop Albums of 2016	#1, BTS, Wings, #2 Day6 Daydream, #3 EXID Street, #4 Akdong Musician Spring, #5 Dean 130 mood : TRBL, #6 BigBang Made, #7 Tiffany I Just Wanna Dance, #8 Seventeen Going Seventeen, #9 Mamamoo Melting, #10 Got7 Fly.	US
B	Dec	22	20 Best K-Pop Songs of 2016	#1 Zico "Bermuda Triangle" featuring Crush and Dean, #2 Wonder Girls "Why So Lonely", #3 Exo "Monster", #4 Blackpink "Whistle", #5 BTS "Blood Sweat & Tears", etc.	US

== 2017 ==
T	M	D	Event	Details	L
CH	Feb	15	1st group tops iTunes Top Songs chart	Top 10, BTS, "Spring Day", soon after the February 12 release, while competing with tracks from the 59th Annual Grammy Awards show that aired that night. Psy topped the chart as a solo artist with "Gangnam Style" in 2012.	US
CH	Feb	21	1st group charts on Bubbling Under Hot 100 Singles	#15, BTS, "Spring Day", (chart dated March 4); Psy had the first #1, as a solo artist, with "Gangnam Style" in 2012.	US
CH	Feb	21	1st act with top 4 on World Digital Songs chart	BTS, #1 "Spring Day", #2 "Not Today", #3 "A Supplementary Story: You Never Walk Alone", #4 "Outro: Wings", (chart dated March 4).	US
CH	Feb	21	1st act with 4 albums on Billboard 200 chart	BTS, The Most Beautiful Moment in Life, Part 2, The Most Beautiful Moment in Life: Young Forever, Wings and You Never Walk Alone (chart dated March 4).	US
B	Apr	10	1st group nominated for Billboard Music Award	BTS, 2017 Billboard Music Awards, May 21, Billboard Music Award for Top Social Artist, competing with Justin Bieber, Selena Gomez, Ariana Grande and Shawn Mendes. The group ranked first 19 times on the List of Billboard Social 50 number-one artists since October 2016.	US
MT	May	21	1st group win and appearance at Billboard Music Awards show	BTS, 2017 Billboard Music Awards show, Billboard Music Award for Top Social Artist. A large global fanbase, "Army", voted for the award on Twitter and on the awards website more than 300 million times and continued to dominate social media while the band was at the ceremony.	US
CH	May	29	Korea K-Pop Hot 100 chart re-established	Relaunched on Korean website, Billboard.co.kr, only, as of the chart dated May 29 – June 4, 2017.	KR
CH	July	15	1st girl group charts on Bubbling Under Hot 100 Singles	#13, Blackpink, "As If It's Your Last", (chart dated July 15); besting BTS' #15 "Spring Day" to become highest charting group to date.	US
F	Aug	30	Billboard Fan Army Face-Off win (4th time), 3rd time for one group	#1 T-ara's Queens, 3rd year win, with 1,349,680 votes, defeating Liam Payne's Payne's in the final round.	US
CH	Sep	24	1st album in Top 10 Billboard 200 chart	BTS, #7 debut, Love Yourself: Her, (chart dated October 7); also fourth #1 on World Albums chart and a fifth #1 on World Digital Song Sales for the song "DNA", beating out Psy's four #1s on the chart.	US
B	Sep	28	Artists on Billboard annual showcase "21 under 21" (7th time)	#18, Twice, (ages, at the time, 18 - 22).	US
O	Oct	9	Long running girl group's members end contracts	Girl's Generation, after 10 years with S.M. Entertainment, Choi Soo-young, Seohyun, and Tiffany Hwang don't renew contracts.	KR
IN	Oct	20	K-pop artist joins Me Too movement	Amber Liu tweets support for #MeToo movement, and discusses sexual harassment.	KR
O	Oct	31	Group joins UNICEF in anti-violence campaign	BTS, Love Myself (campaign) joined UNICEF's #ENDViolence campaign by pledging 500 million KRW and 3% of the Love Yourself series physical album series sales income. The campaign is to make the world safer for children and teenagers.	KR
CH	Nov	7	1st girl group #1 on same date for World Albums and World Digital Song Sales charts	Twice's album, Twicetagram, and single, "Likey" (chart dated November 18); the first girl group to achieve this and second K-pop act after BTS, who charted simultaneously with Wings and "Blood, Sweat & Tears", in 2016; and You Never Walk Alone and "Spring Day", plus Love Yourself:Her and "DNA", both in 2017.	US
F	Nov	13	1st artists with over 10 million Twitter followers	BTS, with accompanying hashtag #LoveBTS10M, earning the group's third Twitter emoji; 1,793 days after their first tweet on December 17, 2012, months before their official debut on June 12, 2013.	O
MT	Nov	19	1st group performs on major American awards show	BTS, American Music Awards of 2017, performed "DNA", their U.S. TV debut, they were introduced by The Chainsmokers.	US
F	Nov	26	Video reaches 3 billion YouTube views	Psy, "Gangnam Style", the 2012 release hit 3 billion views and continues to be the third-most viewed video on YouTube.	O
MT	Nov	27	1st group performs on The Ellen DeGeneres Show	BTS, "MIC Drop" (Steve Aoki remix), and answered fan questions on a "Show Me More Show" segment on YouTube.	US
CH	Nov	28	1st girl group ties for most #1's on World Album chart	Red Velvet #1 debut, Perfect Velvet; their fourth #1 overall and their third #1 this year. They now tie with boy groups B.A.P, Got7 and BTS.	US
MT	Nov	29	1st artists perform on Jimmy Kimmel Live!	BTS, "Mic Drop" (Steve Aoki remix), and performed four more songs as part of the YouTube Jimmy Kimmel Live Concert Series.	US
MT	Nov	30	1st boy group on The Late Late Show with James Corden	BTS, performed "DNA" and played a game called "Flinch" with the host.	US
CH	Dec		1st to top Social 50 Year-end chart	#1 BTS, and #10 on the Top Artists Year-end chart (first in top ten).	US
F	Dec	5	Most Tweeted artist of the year	BTS are the most tweeted about artist of 2017 beating out western artists such as Justin Bieber and Harry Styles.	US
CH	Dec	8	1st group with sixth #1 on World Digital Song Sales Chart	BTS, "Mic Drop" becomes their sixth #1 on the World Digital Song Sales Chart after jumping 7 spots.	US
B	Dec	13	K-pop artists on Billboard's 100 Best Songs of 2017	#49 BTS "DNA"	US
O	Dec	18	Death of K-pop group member at 27-years-old	Kim Jong-hyun, main vocalist of Shinee, debuted with the group in 2008.	KR
O	Dec	20	Billboard Korea relaunches website	Billboard.co.kr, with new image and includes the K-Pop Hot 100 chart's weekly updates.	KR
IN	Dec	21	Pop music (including K-pop) goes global in 2017	K-Town's Jeff Benjamin credits successful Spanish language music like "Despacito" and Korean language music like BTS's "DNA", and more, as evidence that "English is no longer a requirement for mainstream U.S. success". Jesus Lopez, chairman/CEO of Universal Music Latin Entertainment and Universal's Iberian Peninsula division accounts that music consumption, through streaming music and videos, has lowered the language barrier.	US
O	Dec	27	Long running girl group disbands	miss A, together since 2010, confirmed their breakup on December 27, according to their company, JYP Entertainment.	KR
CH	Dec	27	1st K-pop feature on Rock Digital Song Sales chart	#2, RM features, rapping in English, on the debut Fall Out Boy remix "Champion", (chart dated January 3); marks new territory in the rock charts.	US
MT	Dec	31	1st group performance at NYC New Year's Eve celebration	BTS, Dick Clark's New Year's Rockin' Eve, pre-recorded performance of "Mic Drop" and "DNA".	US

== 2018 ==
T	M	D	Event	Details	L
O	Jan	22	1st gay K-pop idol	Holland debuts as the first gay K-pop idol with single "Neverland".	KR
CH	Jan	30	Posthumous Billboard 200 debut	#177 debut, Kim Jong-hyun, Poet | Artist, (chart dated February 3), as a posthumous release.	US
CH	Feb	1	Two acts on Billboard 200 for 2nd time on same chart date	BTS, #90 (for the 16th week on the chart dated February 3), Love Yourself: Her and Jonghyun, #177 (debut) Poet/Artist.	US
O	Feb	12	1st RIAA certification for a group	BTS' "Mic Drop" (February 6) and "DNA" (February 9) were certified gold (half a million sales units) by the RIAA; the first group, after soloist Psy's "Gangnam Style" in 2013.	US
CH	Feb	13	1st time for two artists on Canadian Hot 100 on same chart date	#87 debut, Red Velvet, "Bad Boy", (chart dated February 17), along with #86, BTS, "Mic Drop", on the chart for 11 weeks.	US
B	Feb	15	Artists on Billboard magazine cover (3rd time) and cover story	BTS, first time for a group, on the Billboard edition dated February 17, included eight different covers, a BTS stand-alone, and one each of the seven group members; and, for the first time, a limited-edition box set, with eight full-size posters and the eight issue versions. The issue and website featured an article of the cover photo shoot and interviews, conducted in Seoul.	US
C	Feb	21	1st group to headline at New York's Barclays Center	Got7, Barclays Center, Eyes On You Tour, sold-out last show for the North American leg at the 19,000-capacity arena.	US
MT	Feb	25	Performances at 2018 Winter Olympics closing ceremony	CL and Exo represent K-pop, perform along with several western artists.	KR
IN	Feb	26	#MeToo movement hits South Korean music industry	Rapper Don Malik (Moon In-sub) admits to sexually harassing a fan and is expelled by his agency.	KR
CH	Mar	5	Highest charting solo act on Billboard 200	#63, BTS' J-Hope, Hope World, (chart dated March 10).	US
O	Mar	25	Death of K-pop group member at 33-years-old	Seo Min-woo, leader of 100% since its debut in 2012.	KR
F	Mar	27	1st group with one million Shazams	BTS, "Mic Drop", achieved in four months and eleven days.	O
CH	May	2	1st artists top Emerging Artists chart	#1, NCT, (peaked on the chart dated May 5), along with a #4 on the Social 50 chart.	US
B	May	20	2nd time group win Billboard Music Award	BTS, 2018 Billboard Music Awards, Top Social Artist, second year in a row.	US
MT	May	20	1st performers at Billboard Music Award show	BTS, 2018 Billboard Music Awards, receive award and perform television debut of new song "Fake Love".	
CH	May	27	1st group in Top 10 Billboard Hot 100	#10 debut, BTS, "Fake Love", (chart dated June 2), join soloist Psy's two top ten chartings; along with their first #1 on the Digital Song Sales chart.	US
CH	May	27	1st #1 album on Billboard 200	#1 debut, BTS, Love Yourself: Tear, (chart dated June 2).	US
CH	May	30	1st artists top Artist 100 chart	#1, BTS, (chart dated June 2), previous peak was #2 on April 14; following release of Love Yourself: Tear; the first K-pop and first primarily non-English language act to reach #1, since the chart started in July 2014.	US
CH	Jun	25	Highest charting girl group on Billboard Hot 100 and Billboard 200	#55, Billboard Hot 100, Blackpink, "Ddu-Du Ddu-Du", (debut on the chart dated June 30), second after Wonder Girls' 2009 "Nobody" at #76. And a #40 debut for their EP Square Up on the Billboard 200.	US
CH	Jun	25	1st girl group tops Emerging Artists chart	#1, Blackpink, (chart dated June 30); second act overall, after NCT in May.	US
B	Jul	24	Artists on Billboard greatest music videos century list	"The 100 Greatest Music Videos of the 21st Century: Critics' Picks" (staff picks); #12 Psy "Gangnam Style", #48 Orange Caramel "My Copycat", #67 BTS "Blood Sweat & Tears" and #92 Girls' Generation "Gee".	US
F	Aug	3	Artist in highly Tweeted viral dance challenge	A BTS July 23 tweet, of J-Hope doing Drake's "In My Feelings" dance challenge, has 10.5 million views and was included in the song's official video on August 2.	US
F	Aug	29	Billboard Fan Army Face-Off win (5th time)	#1 Super Junior's E.L.F.s with 2,239,553 votes, defeating Harry Styles's Stylers in the final round.	US
CH	Sep	2	2nd #1 album on Billboard 200 and 1st artists with three albums in Top 10	#1, BTS, Love Yourself: Answer (chart dated Sep 8); includes several pop music top statistics on Billboard charts, including "first pop act since 2014 with two No. 1 albums in less than a year", following One Direction's feat.	US
MT	Sep	11	1st artists guest performance on U.S. talent show	BTS, "Idol", America's Got Talent, the inaugural U.S. prime time TV series performance for the group on the semi-finale.	US
MT	Sep	25-26	1st boy group guests on late-night talk show and U.S. morning show	BTS, The Tonight Show Starring Jimmy Fallon, performed "Idol" and "I'm Fine" and Good Morning America, performed "Idol"; including interviews on both shows.	US
O	Oct	1	1st artists featured as Apple Music's Up Next Artist.	NCT 127, the latest "Up Next" artist; and as part of the partnership, were featured on Apple-based platforms throughout October 2018.	US
C	Oct	6	1st U.S. stadium show	BTS, Citi Field, 42,000-capacity, sold-out BTS World Tour: Love Yourself, last show for the North American leg.	US
MT	Oct	8	2nd artists perform on Jimmy Kimmel Live!	NCT 127, performed "Regular" and "Cherry Bomb", the performance marks the first time NCT 127 appears on U.S. national television.	US
MT	Oct	9	1st artists win an American Music Award	BTS, American Music Awards of 2018, Favorite Social Artist; the group did not attend the awards show.	US
B	Oct	12	Artists on Billboard annual showcase "21 under 21" (8th time)	#20, NCT Dream, (ages, at the time, 16 - 19).	US
MT	Nov	4	Artists perform on Mickey's 90th Spectacular TV special	NCT 127, "Regular" (English version), performed onstage with Mickey Mouse, (pre-recorded for broadcast).	US
CH	Nov	11	1st group reaches 100th week at #1 on Social 50 chart	#1 for 100 non-consecutive weeks, BTS, (chart dated November 17), became the first group and second artist overall, after Justin Bieber (with 163 weeks), to reach 100 or more at #1 since the chart began in December 2010. They debuted with #1 on October 29, 2016.	US
O	Nov	21	1st gold album RIAA certification, and 1st platinum group single	BTS, album Love Yourself:Answer receives gold (half a million sales units), and single "Mic Drop" receives platinum (1 million sales units), along with a gold for single "Idol", all on November 9. Singles "DNA," Fake Love" and "Mic Drop" were certified gold earlier in the year.	US
C	Nov- Dec		1st group performs at iHeartRadio music event	Monsta X, performance included "Shoot Out" and songs from Take.1 Are You There? at the annual Jingle Ball tour for a number of cities, starting with Los Angeles's KIIS-FM Jingle Ball (November 30) thru NYC's Madison Square Garden (December 7).	US
B	Dec	11	K-pop artists on Billboard's 100 Best Songs of 2018	#22 BTS "Fake Love", #43 Red Velvet "Bad Boy", #69 Pentagon "Shine", #87 IU "Bbibbi"	US
F	Dec	18	1st group song on YouTube Rewind	BTS, "Idol", YouTube Rewind 2018: Everyone Controls Rewind, played as a background nod to K-pop music for the annual series.	O
O	Jan-	Dec	1st K-pop in top 10 IFPI's yearly artist and album lists	#2, BTS, 2018 Global Recording Artist of the Year and two albums, Love Yourself: Answer (#2) and Love Yourself: Tear (#3) on "Global top albums of 2018".	O

== 2019 ==
T	M	D	Event	Details	L
MT	Jan	2	U.S. TV remake of South Korean singing competition show	The Masked Singer debut, based on hit show King of Mask Singer, which has included many K-pop stars. The U.S. show tweeted welcomes from BTS, Wanna One and Winner.	US
F	Jan	4	Artist breaks SoundCloud record	Jimin, biggest 24-hour debut, solo ballad "Promise" (uploaded December 31, 2018 and streamed 8.5 million times); besting Drake's "Duppy Freestyle" which had 4.9 million streams.	O
O	Jan	6	1st group doll collection by major American toy company	BTS, Mattel announced the licensing agreement with Big Hit Entertainment at the Hong Kong Toys and Games Fair, set for a summer launch, citing BTS' "global appeal". Mattel's stock price jumped by an 8.26% increase the following day.	US
MT	Feb	10	1st Grammy Award nomination and presenters	BTS, 61st Annual Grammy Awards, nomination for Love Yourself: Tear, art director HuskyFox, Best Recording Package; and presented the Grammy Award for Best R&B Album to H.E.R., H.E.R. (album).	US
MT	Feb	12	2nd girl group guests on U.S. morning show and late-night talk show	Blackpink, Good Morning America and The Late Show with Stephen Colbert, performed "Ddu-Du Ddu-Du" and announced their upcoming In Your Area World Tour.	US
F	Feb	21	2018 Twitter top account and top tweet	BTS was the top tweeted account overall and a video of J-Hope performing Drake's "In My Feelings" dance challenge was the top tweet.	O
IN	Feb	21	Twitter announces K-pop tweets for 2018	5.3 billion K-pop related tweets in 2018 emanated from these 20 countries: Argentina, Brazil, Canada, Chile, France, India, Indonesia, Japan, Malaysia, Mexico, Peru, the Philippines, Singapore, South Korea, Taiwan, Thailand, Turkey, the United Kingdom, the United States and Vietnam.	O
B	Feb	28	Artists on Billboard magazine cover (4th time) and cover story	Blackpink, first girl group, on the Billboard edition dated March 2, included five different covers, a Blackpink stand-alone and one each of the four group members, and a limited-edition box set, with five full-size posters and the five issue versions. The issue and website featured an article of the cover photo shoot and interviews, conducted in Los Angeles.	US
IN	Feb	28	Streaming sites report major K-pop growth	Spotify, since 2015, listening has increased by 65 percent annually; Apple Music, yearly growth with an 86 percent increase in the U.S. between 2017 and 2018; Pandora's girl group station increased 182 percent in 2018 and the boy band station by 90 percent.	US
IN	Feb	28	100 percent K-pop growth in sales and streaming	A Billboard analysis of Nielsen's sales data of 17 acts on the Billboard charts for the past decade estimated that sales and streaming activity rose almost 100 percent and more per year, for the past four years, with a 166 percent increase from 2017 to 2018. 2018's activity was mainly from BTS, with their physical sales activity at 41 percent; while overall U.S. physical sales decreased by double-digits.	US
IN	Feb	28	U.S. chain store company to sell K-pop music/items	Trans World Entertainment announced they will add a K-pop section to its 210 U.S. stores and websites, to sell music and merchandise; and have signed an agreement with South Korean chart company Hanteo to report K-pop music sales.	US
IN	Mar	11- 14	Wide-ranging K-pop scandal begins	Dubbed the Burning Sun scandal after a Gangnam nightclub underwent investigation for "illegal narcotics use, sexual assaults and corrupt deals with police officials". It led to the retirement of four idols within days, Seungri of BigBang (March 11), Jung Joon-young of Drug Restaurant (March 12), Yong Jun-hyung of Highlight (March 14), and Choi Jong-hoon of F.T. Island (March 14); and involved Lee Jong-hyun of CNBLUE.	KR
C	Mar	20-21	1st girl group holds Japan dome tour	Twice, #Dreamday tour, started with two sold out dates at Kyocera Dome Osaka, 55,000 capacity; followed by dates at the Tokyo Dome and Nagoya Dome.	O
F	Apr	12	1st artists with 5 billion Spotify streams	BTS, coincides with album release, Map of the Soul: Persona and follows their prior song "Fake Love" as the #1 K-pop song streamed in 2018.	O
C	Apr	12	1st girl group performs at Coachella	Blackpink, performed "Ddu-Du Ddu-Du", "Kill This Love", and Jennie Kim's "Solo", among others.	US
MT	Apr	13	1st performance on Saturday Night Live	BTS, performed "Boy With Luv" and "Mic Drop".	US
IN	Apr	17	Mainstream SNS site launch's K-pop hub	Tumblr, kpop.tumblr.com, started with a Q&A feature on Iz One and an interview with Ateez.	US
F	Apr	18	MV breaks 3 Guinness World Records for YouTube	BTS, "Boy with Luv" feat. Halsey, released April 12; earned titles: "most viewed YouTube video in 24 hours," "most viewed YouTube music video in 24 hours," and "most viewed YouTube music video in 24 hours by a K-pop group."	O
F	Apr	18	K-Pop fans set Twitter record	Recognized by Guinness World Records for "the most used hashtag on Twitter in a 24-hour period, with the hashtag 'Twitter Best Fandom'" for voting during the 14th Annual Soompi Awards in March.	O
MT	Apr	18	2nd boy group performs on Good Morning America	NCT 127, "Superhuman" (premiere of new single) and "Cherry Bomb".	US
MT	Apr	18	1st girl group performs on The Late Late Show with James Corden	Blackpink, performed "Kill This Love" and played a game called "Flinch" with the host.	US
CH	Apr	21	3rd #1 album on Billboard 200	BTS, Map of the Soul: Persona (chart dated April 27), third #1 in less than 11 months, along with Love Yourself: Tear" (June 2, 2018), Love Yourself: Answer" (September 8, 2018); includes several pop music top statistics on Billboard charts, including "first group since The Beatles to earn three No. 1s in less than a year."	US
CH	Apr	22	1st group with 2 songs in Top 10 Billboard Hot 100	#8, BTS, "Boy with Luv" feat. Halsey, (chart dated April 27), along with "Fake Love" #10 (June 2, 2018); join soloist Psy's two top ten chartings.	US
MT	May	1	1st win for two Billboard Music Awards and 2nd performance	BTS, 2019 Billboard Music Awards show; 2nd year performance ("Boy with Luv" with Halsey), 3rd year win (Top Social Artist), and first K-pop win (Top/Duo Group). Exo and Got7 were also nominated for Top Social Artist.	US
CH	May	4- 5	Highest-grossing tour at Rose Bowl, etc.	BTS World Tour Love Yourself: Speak Yourself grossed $16.6 million for two concerts at the Rose Bowl, the highest score for the venue, besting boxscore totals of Taylor Swift, U2 and others. Dates at Soldier Field and MetLife Stadium ranked in the top five; and the combined 12 tour dates from May 4 - June 8 grossed $78.9 million with 606,409 tickets sold.	O
MT	May	14	2nd boy group on The Late Late Show with James Corden	NCT 127, performed "Superhuman" and played a game called "Flinch" with the host.	US
MT	May	15	Artists perform in Central Park concert on morning show	BTS, Good Morning America's summer concert series, live TV performance of "Boy with Luv" and "Fire", and chat with hosts.	US
MT	May	15	The Beatles 50+ year homage on U.S. TV show	BTS, The Late Show with Stephen Colbert, perform "Boy with Luv" in black and white filming, mimicking The Beatles Feb. 9, 1964 debut in the same venue, the Ed Sullivan Theater on The Ed Sullivan Show; also performed "Make It Right" and chatted with host Colbert.	US
MT	May	16	1st artists guest on cartoon show	Monsta X, Cartoon Network's We Bare Bears, titled "Panda's Birthday"; Panda bear gets to meet his favorite K-pop band.	US
MT	May	21	1st artists guest performance on singing competition show	BTS, "Boy with Lov", The Voice finale.	US
CH	May	1- 31	Month's top-grossing tour	BTS, BTS World Tour Love Yourself: Speak Yourself, 8 concert dates (6 in the U.S. and 2 in Brazil) grossed $51.6 million; the biggest one-month total for 2019, so far.	US
C	Jun	1- 2	1st artists perform at Wembley Stadium	BTS, two concerts of their Love Yourself: Speak Yourself World Tour.	O
IN	June	12& 14	Entertainment agency scandal	YG Entertainment's artist B.I leaves iKon after allegations of prior attempted drug purchases, adding to other company related allegations from the Burning Sun scandal, and two days later, its founder Yang Hyun-suk and his brother, CEO Yang Min-suk, resigned.	KR
O	Jun	20	1st artists, two platinum single RIAA certifications	BTS, "Boy with Luv" with Halsey; received gold and platinum on the registry entry date, following "Mic Drop".	US
MT	Jun	21	1st group guests on The Today Show	Got7, performed a new English version of "Eclipse" and interview with hosts.	US
O	Jul	15	1st global ambassador for World Scout Foundation	NCT Dream, in collaboration released an all English language motivational song "Fireflies", with proceeds to benefit Scouts in low-income countries, and performed at the 24th World Scout Jamboree at The Summit Bechtel Family National Scout Reserve on July 23.	O
MT	Jul	23	MTV Video Music Award adds K-pop category	2019 MTV Video Music Awards, "Best K-pop", nominees are Blackpink's "Kill This Love", BTS and Halsey's "Boy with Luv", Exo's "Tempo", Monsta X and French Montana's "Who Do You Love?", NCT 127's "Regular" and TXT's "Cat & Dog".	US
O	Jul	25	Artist collaborates with Billboard 100 top artist	BTS's RM joins Lil Nas X for a remix of his "Old Town Road", titled "Seoul Town Road", with new art cover including a purple horse, a nod to BTS fandom's color purple; "that helped push the country/hip-hop hybrid to its record-breaking 17th week at No. 1 on the Billboard Hot 100 chart."	US
MT	Aug	1	3rd boy group performs on Good Morning America	Monsta X, "Who Do U Love?", an English language release featuring French Montana; during U.S. stops for their We Are Here tour.	US
MT	Aug	11	1st performance at Teen Choice Awards and multiple awards win	Monsta X, 2019 Teen Choice Awards, performed "Who Do U Love?"; and award wins: BTS, Choice International Artist, Choice Collaboration (Boy with Luv featuring Halsey), Choice Summer Tour (BTS World Tour Love Yourself: Speak Yourself); Blackpink, Choice Song: Group ("Ddu-Du Ddu-Du"); Red Velvet featured with Ellie Goulding and Diplo, Choice Electronic/Dance Song ("Close to Me (Red Velvet Remix)"}; and #BTSARMY, Choice Fandom.	US
O	Aug	15	1st RIAA certification for a girl group	Blackpink,"Ddu-Du Ddu-Du" was certified gold (half a million sales units) by the RIAA.	US
MT	Aug	26	Artists win 2 of 5 MTV VMA nominations	BTS, 2019 MTV Video Music Awards, won "Best Group" (Blackpink was also nominated in this category), and "Best K-pop" for their song "Boy with Luv" with Halsey, which was also nominated for "Best Collaboration", "Best Art Direction" and "Best Choreography".	US
IN	Aug	28	Entertainment scandal continues fallout	Lee Jong-hyun leaves the group CNBLUE, after prior involvement in the Jung Joon-young KakaoTalk chatrooms, and a newer one involving a YouTuber.	KR
B	Sep	12	1st artists 2 times on Billboard annual showcase "21 under 21" (K-pop 9th time)	#13, NCT Dream, 2nd year, (ages, at the time, 17 - 19).	US
IN	Sep	26	K-pop one of the most popular genres in the world	2019 report, IFPI lists K-pop seventh in a music listening survey of 18 countries; preceded by pop, rock, oldies, hip-hop/rap, dance/electronic and indie/alternative.	O
CH	Sep	27	2nd group top debut on Social 50 chart	#2, SuperM, (chart dated September 28); highest debut after BTS #1.	US
F	Oct	3	Readers' Poll Your Fave K-Pop/Latin Collaboration	Four picks: J-Hope and Becky G's 2019 "Chicken Noodle Soup", Super Junior and Leslie Grace's 2018 "Lo Siento", Super Junior and Reik's 2018 "One More Time (Otra Vez)" and CD9 and Crayon Pop's 2016 "Get Dumb".	US
C	Oct	5	1st K-pop artists hold initial debut in U.S.	SuperM, a group formed by SM Entertainment and Capitol Records, outside the Capitol Records Building in Los Angeles.	US
CH	Oct	7	1st BTS' member solo on Hot 100 chart	#81, (chart dated October 12), J-Hope feat. Becky G, "Chicken Noodle Soup", sixth artist and third soloist overall; and J-Hope's second #1 on World Digital Song Sales chart, after "Daydream".	US
MT	Oct	9	2nd boy group guests on The Ellen DeGeneres Show	SuperM, in their TV debut, performed their debut single "Jopping" and interviewed with host.	US
C	Oct	11	1st foreign artists headline stadium show in Saudi Arabia	BTS, King Fahd International Stadium, BTS World Tour Love Yourself: Speak Yourself; placed them on Billboard's top Hot Tours along with their Seoul concert dates.	O
O	Oct	11	20 years of the term "K-pop" at Billboard	A look back at the first use of the term "K-pop" in the October 9, 1999 issue of Billboard, by Seoul correspondent Cho Hyun-jin (currently a professor at Kookmin University).	US
O	Oct	14	Death of K-pop celebrity at 25-years-old	Sulli, (death reported on October 14), singer and actress, previously of the group f(x).	KR
CH	Oct	19	2nd group and 1st debut album tops Billboard 200	#1, SuperM's SuperM (chart dated October 19), following BTS; and first in top 10 for any of the supergroup's originating groups.	US
F	Oct	23	Group sets TikTok record	BTS, recognized by Guinness World Records for "the fastest time to reach one million followers on TikTok" after joining on September 25; done in three hours and 31 minutes time.	O
CH	Oct	31	All-time record at #1 on Social 50 chart	BTS, #2 all-time (chart dated November 2), second artists to reach 150 weeks at #1 on the Social 50 chart, behind Justin Bieber with 163 weeks (leader since 2011); followed by Taylor Swift (28 weeks), Miley Cyrus (21 weeks) and Rihanna (21 weeks).	US
F	Nov	1	Large fan fundraiser to support group member	"Monbebe", fans of Monsta X, raise more than $20,000 for a Times Square billboard to support Wonho's return to the group after his agency dismissed him.	US
MT	Nov	3	1st performance at MTV Europe Music Award	NCT 127, performed "Highway to Heaven".	O
IN	Nov	4	1st major agency signs with U.S. agency	SM Entertainment announces signing with Creative Artists Agency for representation; expectations that SuperM and NCT 127 will expand globally.	US
CH	Nov	6	1st album on Billboard 200 for one year	BTS, Love Yourself: Answer (chart dated November 9), on chart for 52 non-consecutive weeks.	US
CH	Nov	15+	1st on Billboard Decade-End charts (2010s)	#1, Psy's "Gangnam Style", Streaming Songs; #4, BTS, Social 50, (at report time on November 27, they had spent 152 weeks at #1 (with nine more weeks at #2), and were the only artists, along with Justin Bieber with over 28 weeks, then 100, then 150 weeks on the chart (Bieber first charted in January 2011 and BTS in October 2016); also, #20 Exo, #28 Got7, #39 Seventeen, #43 Monsta X, #45 Psy, #48 NCT 127, and #50 NCT; #44, Psy's "Gangnam Style", Digital Song Sales; #45, BTS, Top Touring Artists.	US
B	Nov	19	1st on Billboard Takeover Tuesday	TXT were invited by the weekly Billboard column to put together a playlist of music they were listening to.	US
O	Nov	20+	1st with display at Grammy Award museum	BTS, their black and white tuxedos worn while presenting an award at the 61st Annual Grammy Awards, at the Grammy Museum at L.A. Live "On the Red Carpet" exhibit, November 20 through February 1, 2020.	US
B	Nov	21	3 songs on Billboard "100 Songs That Defined the Decade"	BTS ("I Need U"), Girls' Generation ("I Got a Boy") and Psy ("Gangnam Style"); Billboard staff picks for the 2010s with no numerical ranking.	US
O	Nov	24	Death of K-pop celebrity at 28-years-old	Goo Hara, (death reported on November 24), singer and actress, previously of the group Kara.	KR
MT	Nov	24	Group win an American Music Award second time	BTS, American Music Awards of 2019, nominated and won three awards, Favorite Social Artist, Favorite Duo or Group – Pop/Rock, Tour of the Year (Love Yourself World Tour) to become the year's top group or duo; the group did not attend the awards show.	US
B	Nov	25	1st Billboard decades-end K-pop song list	100 Greatest K-Pop Songs of the 2010s: Staff List, #1 is IU's "Good Day" from her 2010 EP Real.	US
MT	Nov	28	1st performance in major U.S. parade	NCT 127, Macy's Thanksgiving Day Parade, rode the Lego "turkey-dragon" float and performed; and the following day they were interviewed and performed on The Today Show.	US
F	Dec	2	2nd most popular entity on Tumblr for 2019	#2 overall, BTS (Good Omens (TV series) was #1); along with #1, BTS, for Top 50 K-pop groups, and positions #1 through #7 for all the BTS members, led by Jungkook at #1, for Top 100 K-pop Stars.	O
F	Dec	3	Apple Music's top K-pop for 2019	#1, BTS, K-pop artists (Apple Music's 2019 Top Streamed Artists by Genre) and #1, BTS featuring Halsey's "Boy With Luv" (Most-Shazamed Songs by Genre).	O
F	Dec	4	K-pop awards show top Twitter trends	2019 Mnet Asian Music Awards, 102 million tweets from start of voting on October 24 through the date of show on December 4 (21 million tweets on that date) with #1 trending hashtags (#1 #MAMAVOTE, #2 #BTS) across 46 countries (#1 South Korea, #2 United States).	O
B	Dec	4	Artists on Billboard best 2019 live shows list	The Best Live Shows Of 2019: Staff Picks (24 picks in date order, mostly from the U.S.); included BTS' Love Yourself World Tour (MetLife Stadium, May 19). Four honorable mentions included Blackpink's Coachella concert stage (April 12).	US
CH	Dec	5	Group tops Year-end Social 50 chart for 3 years	#1 BTS (for Year-end charts for 2017, 2018 and 2019); others on 2019's Year-end top ten were: #2 Exo, #4 Got7, #6 Seventeen, #7 NCT 127, #8 Monsta X and #9 Blackpink (first girl group in top ten).	US
B	Dec	6	Song on Billboard new release report	"Suga's Interlude" on Billboard First Stream, Suga collaboration with Halsey from her album Manic.	US
F	Dec	6	3 artists on 2019 YouTube Rewind	YouTube Rewind 2019: For the Record, Most Liked Videos of 2019: #2 BTS "Boy With Luv" featuring Halsey, #3 Blackpink "Kill This Love" and #9 J-Hope featuring Becky G "Chicken Noodle Soup"; annual series of most popular videos, with no artist listed twice (for variety).	O
C	Dec	6& 13	Two groups perform at 2019 iHeartRadio music events	BTS, KIIS-FM Jingle Ball (December 6 in Los Angeles), "Boy with Luv" with Halsey, etc.; and Monsta X (2nd year iHeartRadio event performances), iHeartRadio Jingle Ball Tour (December 13 in NYC), "Who Do You Love" (French Montana collaboration), etc.	US
F	Dec	9	2019 Twitter top music account and top tweet	#1 BTS, Most Tweeted Musical Act, and #1 BTS June 9 tweet of Jungkook dancing to Billie Eilish "Bad Guy" was the Most Retweeted Tweet.	O
F	Dec	12	1st K-pop mv on YouTube decades list	#5, Psy, "Gangnam Style", (most viewed for the 2010s), with nearly 3.5 billion views.	O
B	Dec	17	Best K-pop albums of the 2010s	#1 f(x) 2013 Pink Tape, etc.; a Billboard staff pick list of 25 albums.	US
B	Dec	29	Best K-pop songs of 2019	#1 Exo "Obsession", etc.; a Billboard staff pick list of 25 songs.	US
B	Dec	31	Best K-pop albums of 2019	#1 Seventeen An Ode, etc.; a Billboard staff pick list of 25 albums.	US
MT	Dec	31	1st group performs live at NYC New Year's Eve	BTS, Dick Clark's New Year's Rockin' Eve, performed "Boy with Luv" and "Make it Right" and greeted the new year with hosts and other celebrities.	US

== See also ==
- List of K-pop on the Billboard charts
- List of K-pop albums on the Billboard charts
- List of K-pop songs on the Billboard charts
- List of K-pop on the Billboard year-end charts
- Korea K-Pop Hot 100
- Billboard K-Pop Artist 100
- List of K-pop artists
- List of South Korean idol groups
- Billboard Korea Hot 100
