= Billboard Korea Hot 100 =

South Korean record chart

The Billboard Korea Hot 100 was a record chart in South Korea, published weekly by Billboard, in conjunction with Billboard Korea. The chart was launched on December 3, 2025, alongside the Billboard Korea Global K-Songs chart, and ranked the most popular songs, regardless of language, in the country. It served as a replacement for the Billboard South Korea Songs chart that was discontinued in January 2025. The chart was updated every Tuesday on both the Billboard and Billboard Korea websites.

It was discontinued on the issue dated April 11, 2026 disappearing from the Billboard Korea website, but remaining on the US Billboard website with the historical archive.

The first number-one song on the chart was "Good Goodbye" by Hwasa on the issue dated December 6, 2025. The last number-one song was "Swim" by BTS on the issue dated April 11, 2026.

== Methodology ==
The chart tracks songs' performance from Friday to Thursday. Chart rankings are based on streaming activity and digital download sales from major global and domestic digital music platforms in South Korea with data provided by Luminate Data.

== List of number-one songs ==
Issue date	Song	Artist(s)	Wks.	Ref.
December 6, 2025	"Good Goodbye"	Hwasa	2	
December 20, 2025	"Bbuu!"	Plave	15	
April 4, 2026	"Swim"	BTS	2	

== See also ==
- Billboard charts
- List of K-pop on the Billboard charts
- List of K-pop on the Billboard year-end charts
- Timeline of K-pop at Billboard
- Billboard Korea
