= Smacksoft =

South Korean band

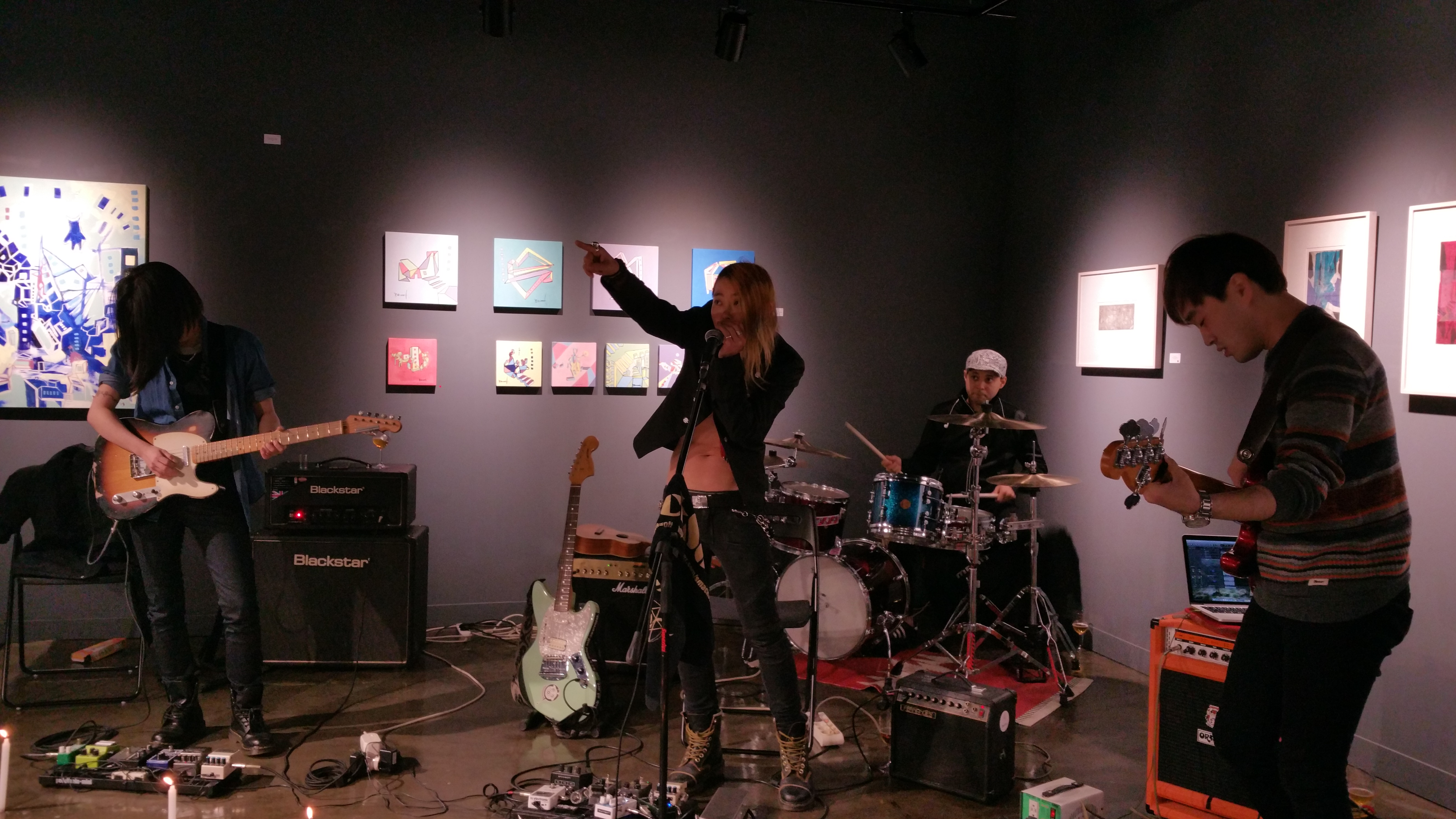
- Smacksoft at Whang Bo-ryung's solo art exhibit, "Capital City : Soul", Seoul, October 2015

Background information
- Origin: Seoul, South Korea
- Genres: Post-punk, experimental rock
- Years active: 2000–present
- Members: Whang Bo-ryung; Choi Hi-je; DeAnthony Nelson Jr. Shin Ji-yong
- Past members: See members section
- Website: smacksoft.net

Whang Bo-ryung = Smacksoft (Korean: 황보령 = Smacksoft), commonly known as Smacksoft, is a South Korean post-punk and experimental rock band formed in 2000 by the lead singer-songwriter Whang Bo-ryung.

The band is prominent in the local indie scene in Hongdae, Seoul where front woman Whang is known as one of the most respected female rockers. Two of their albums were nominated for Best Modern Rock Album at the Korean Music Awards: Shines in the Dark in 2010 and Follow Your Heart in 2013.

== History ==
=== 2000–02: Formation and hiatus ===
The band's founder and lead singer-songwriter Whang was born in Seoul and moved to the United States as a teenager. After performing as a university student in New York City, she returned to Seoul in 1998 and released an album of her own. In 2000, she formed the Smacksoft band when they played a final track on her second album, Sun Sign, which she was recording. The band toured in South Korea and Japan in 2002, in support of Sun Sign, then took a hiatus when Whang took time off to continue her education and travel.

=== 2008–present: SXSW, North American and European tour ===
Returning to Seoul in 2008, Whang reunited the band and released the EP SmackSoft 2.5 in January 2009. She is also a professional artist and provides original artwork for the album covers.

On July 24, 2009, they appeared with a group of musicians of different genres in concert at Gwanghwamun Art Hall, title Star English Concert, for the Educational Broadcasting System, a fundraiser for the hearing impaired. They released studio albums Shines in the Dark in 2009, which received a nomination for Best Modern Rock Album at the Korean Music Awards, and Mana Wind in 2010. Whang said the title Mana Wind stood for a supernatural wind, and symbolized a strength to overcome hardships in your life. One song on the album, "Blue Marbles", was based on her remembrances of the light's reflections on a favorite blue marble that she had played with when young.

On February 26, 2011, the band participated in a fundraiser in Seoul for post-rock indie group Apollo 18, an indie band traveling to North America and SXSW. The band was featured on Arirang Radio in February and March. In August 2011, they performed at the Pentaport Rock Festival.

In 2012, they released the album Follow Your Heart, which received the band's second nomination for Best Modern Rock Album at the Korean Music Awards. On March 2, 2012, they played with nine bands at a benefit concert in Hongdae, "Rock & Resistance", in support of the Gangjeong Village's concerns about government construction of the Jeju Naval Base. On June 30, 2012, three of the band members played an acoustic set at Jeju City's One Night Acoustic in Jamaica Concert.

On April 19, 2013, they participated in a Cystic Fibrosis Foundation charity event in Hongdae, called Shake Shop, with bands Jambinai and Juck Juck Grunzie, and bellydancer Eshe. On December 15, 2013, the band appeared on the SBS special Legends Cover, a tribute for underground singer Kim Hyun-sik.

On March 14, 2014, they performed at SXSW's 2k14 Seoulsonic in Austin, Texas with Big Phony, Glen Check, Rock N' Roll Radio and Love X Stereo; with a continued US tour, including CAAMFest in San Francisco. On March 29, 2014, they played the second Hongdaefest, joining older and newer groups in an effort to introduce the Hongdae music scene, "once known as an incubator for indie bands such as Crying Nut and Rumblefish". In April 2014, they performed at Amsterdam's CinemAsia Film Festival.

On October 27, 2016, they released their sixth album, Urbane Sanity, with eleven tracks, following single releases of Are You Ready?_Urbane Sanity in August and Go! Urbane Sanity in September, with songs from the same album. They performed some of the new music at a Seoul art exhibition, "Mundo", held by Whang and artist Sin Ifie, also in September. The album's ninth track "You Are There_R.I.P" is a memorial song for Michael Jackson, David Bowie, Whitney Houston, Robin Williams, Prince and Whang's father, who died the previous winter. Whang, also, humorously credits her house cat "Bach" for work on the song's creation, as he was sleeping on the synthesizer, then suddenly awakened and kicked off with his back foot, creating some notes on the last verse that she retained on the song.

== Musical style and influences ==
The band's sound is influenced by artists such as Brian Eno, The Velvet Underground, and Sonic Youth. John Redmond of The Korea Times described their musical style as "a fantastic, densely-layered hybrid sound of post-punk, rock and electronica". Kim Young-jin of the same newspaper described the band as having a "penchant for avant-garde", with "the music [ranging] from ambient to electro-synth", and compared lead singer Whang's "husky voice" to Cat Power. In 2014 at SXSW, Luke Winkie of The Austin Chronicle said they "weave layered, smoky synthetic blankets like Portishead".

== Lineups ==
The band's members who accompany Whang have changed over the years. In 2000, the band included Yoon Sung-hoon (guitar), Lee Min-jung (bass) and Hirsch (drums); in 2008, Park Jong-geun (guitar), Park Jin-sun (keyboards) and Seo Jung-hyun (bass); in 2009, Park Jong-geun (guitar), Park Jin-sun (keyboards), Seo Jung-hyun (bass) and Kim Heon-deok (drums); in 2010, Nicholas Ellis and Yoon Sung-hoon (guitar), Park Jin-sun (keyboards), Lee Jung-hyun (bass) and Seo Jin-shil (drums); in 2011, Yoon Sung-hoon (guitar), Bachan Kyu-neun (keyboard), Seo Jung-hyun (bass) and Seo Jin-shil (drums); in 2012, Rainbow99 (guitar), Kang Ha-neul (keyboard), Shin Ji-yong (bass) and Seo Jin-shil (drums); in 2013, Ryu Seong-hyun (guitar), Kang Ha-neul (keyboard), Shin Ji-yong (bass) and Seo Jin-shil (drums); and in 2014, Rainbow99 (guitar), Kang Ha-neul (keyboards), Shin Ji-yong (bass) and Seo Jin-shil (drums).

Since 2015, the members are Whang (vocals, guitar, ukulele), Choi Hi-je (Korean: 최희제) (lead guitar), Shin Ji-yong (Korean: 신지용) (bass guitar), and DeAnthony Nelson Jr. (drums).

== Discography ==
=== EP ===
- SmackSoft 2.5 (2009)

=== Studio album ===
- The Sun Sign (2001)
- Shines in the Dark (2009)
- Mana Wind (2010)
- Follow Your Heart (2012)
- Urbane Sanity (2016)

== Awards and nominations ==
In 2011, they were number 54 on Louder Than War's "Top 57 new bands for 2011".

Year	Award	Category	Nominated work	Result	Ref.
2010	Korean Music Awards	Best Modern Rock Album	Shines in the Dark	Nominated	
2013	Korean Music Awards	Best Modern Rock Album	Follow Your Heart	Nominated	
