= DFSB Kollective =

South Korean music distribution company

- Founded: South Korea
- Headquarters: Seoul, South Korea
- Website: Official website

DFSB Kollective is a South Korean agency specializing in the distribution of K-pop songs worldwide.

== Overview ==
According to Canadian Music Week, DFSB Kollective was responsible for organizing the first sold-out K-Pop concert tour in the United States. It also distributes many K-Pop albums in North America and has rolled out over 250 K-Pop artists into digital music stores and sites.

According to Time magazine, DFSB Kollective is the first worldwide distributor of K-pop songs on iTunes.

== Lawsuits ==
In 2012, the agency filed a copyright-infringement claim against an Australian internet user for "unauthorized download".

In early 2013, DFSB Kollective sued two webmasters for illegally uploading its music onto several blog sites.

In October 2015, DFSB Kollective sued Korean entertainment giant CJ E&M for copyright infringement. The suit was the biggest copyright infringement case of 2015 in the US based on monetary damages sought.

== See also ==
- Seoulsonic
