= Neon Bunny =

South Korean singer-songwriter

- Born: Lim Yoo-jin
- Occupation: Singer-songwriter
- Years active: 2011–present
- Labels: Doggy Rich, Flau

Korean name
- Hangul: 임유진
- RR: Im Yujin
- MR: Im Yujin

Stage name
- Hangul: 야광토끼
- Hanja: 夜光토끼
- RR: Yagwang Tokki
- MR: Yagwang T'okki

Lim Yoo-jin (Korean: 임유진), better known by her stage name Neon Bunny (야광토끼), is a South Korean singer-songwriter. At the ninth annual Korean Music Awards in 2012, she won Best Pop Album for Seoulight.

== Life and career ==
Prior to her solo debut, Neon Bunny was a session keyboard player for the South Korean indie rock group The Black Skirts. She debuted in 2011 with the album Seoulight. After making her debut, she released an EP entitled Happy Ending in 2012 as a follow-up to Seoulight.

In 2014, Neon Bunny released the single "It's You." In 2015, she released "Romance in Seoul," which was ranked at number 8 on Noisey's "Top 20 K-pop Songs of 2015" list. In 2016, she released "Forest of Skyscrapers," the video of which was inspired by Wong Kar-wai's films and Japanese animation like Akira.

On July 13, 2016, she released the second album, Stay Gold, which includes "It's You," "Romance in Seoul," and "Forest of Skyscrapers." It was named by Bandcamp as one of the best Korean electro-pop releases of 2016.

On November 25, 2017, she released the single "Now." The single was written, arranged and produced by Neon Bunny, and mixed and mastered by Cliff Lin.

== Discography ==
Albums

- Seoulight (2011)
- Stay Gold (2016)
- Kosmos (2021)

EPs

- Happy Ending (2012)

Singles

- "It's You" (2014)
- "Romance in Seoul" (2015)
- "Forest of Skyscrapers" (2016)
- "Now" (2017)
- "Tell Me" (2018)
- "Girl" (2019)

Compilations

- "Lost in Love" from My Secret Hotel OST Part 2 (2014)

Guest appearances

- Demicat – "Singing Bird" from Out Loud (2013)
- Smells – "Listen to Your Heart" from Up and Down (2013)
- Spazzkid – "Daytime Disco" (2014)
- Demicat – "Light" from Oredorok (2017)
- Night Tempo – "Overture" from Moonrise (2018)
- Swimrabbit – "Azilangi" (2018)

== Awards and nominations ==
Year	Award	Category	Nominated work	Result	Ref.
2011	Cyworld Digital Music Awards	Tam Eum Mania (April)	"Can't Stop Thinking About You"	Won	
2012	Korean Music Awards	Best New Artist	Seoulite	Nominated	
2012	Korean Music Awards	Best Pop Album	Seoulite	Won	
2012	Korean Music Awards	Best Pop Song	"Polar Bear"	Nominated	
2017	Korean Music Awards	Best Dance & Electronic Album	Stay Gold	Nominated	
