= Timeline of K-pop at Billboard in the 2020s =

Current Billboard logo.

Timeline of K-pop at Billboard in the 2020s is a history of K-pop as recorded by Billboard, Billboard charts, and Billboard K-Town, an online magazine column, presented by Billboard on its Billboard.com site, that reports on K-pop music; artists, concerts, chart information and news events. It is preceded by earlier history at Timeline of K-pop at Billboard.

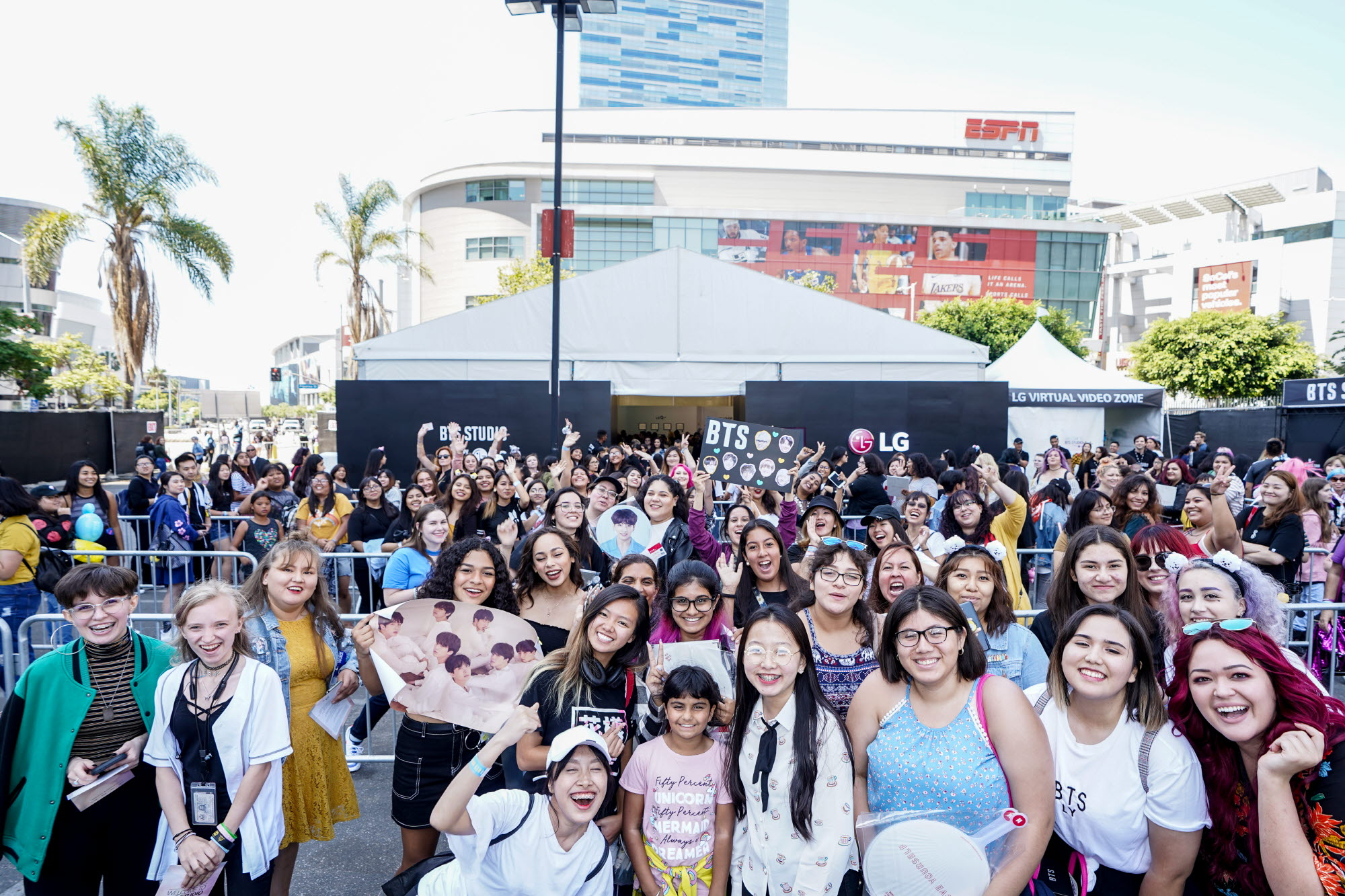
By the end of the 2010s, BTS was dominating Billboard K-pop charting in the U.S. "Army" fans at Love Yourself World Tour, Los Angeles, 2018.

== Legend ==
Type codes
T	Event type
B	Billboard picks
C	Concert events
CH	Chart information
F	Fan picks
IN	Industry news
MT	Movie or television related
O	Other

Location codes
Event location	L
South Korea	KR
United States	US
Other	O

== 2020 ==
- Red lettering for Type codes denotes events affected by the COVID-19 pandemic

T	M	D	Event	Details	L
O	Jan	2	Return of group on hiatus announced	Big Bang, Coachella's April scheduled line-up includes them; the first official news of the group's return since military service for four members and Seungri's 2019 exit from the group.	US
IN	Jan	6	Group disbands over vote-fixing controversy	X1, formed in 2019 on the TV competition series Produce 101, disbanded due to the Mnet vote manipulation investigation.	KR
IN	Jan	14	Twitter announces K-pop tweets for 2019	BTS was the top tweeted music account overall and a BTS video of Jungkook dancing to Billie Eilish's "Bad Guy" was the top tweet overall. 6.1 billion K-pop related tweets in 2019 (fifteen percent increase from 2018) emanated from these 15 countries: Thailand, South Korea, Indonesia, U.S., Philippines, Brazil, Malaysia, Japan, Mexico, Argentina, Canada, France, Great Britain, India, and Turkey.	O
O	Jan	23	1st platinum album RIAA certification and 3rd single	BTS, album Love Yourself: Answer (released on November 21, 2018) and single "Idol" receive platinum (1 million units) certification. Singles "Mic Drop" and "Boy with Luv" previously received platinum.	US
B	Jan	23	K-pop executive on 2020 Billboard Power List	Bang Si-hyuk, CEO/Executive Producer of Big Hit Entertainment, (selected in the "Management" section, list is organized by sector, then listed alphabetically). Accomplishments cited included BTS' charting (1st group since The Beatles to have three #1 albums on the Billboard 200 in less than a year) and record revenue reports ($172 million for first half of 2019); along with diversifying the company: premiering a new group TXT (topped World Albums chart), acquiring Source Music and launching the mobile game BTS World.	US
B	Jan	23	K-pop executive on 2020 Billboard Impact List	Lee Soo-man, Executive Producer of SM Entertainment, (22 noted industry honorees, in addition to the Billboard Power List, listed alphabetically). Accomplishments cited included: launching new supergroup SuperM, years in entertainment (since 1970s), partnering with Capitol Music Group and with Global Citizen (serving as executive director for the 2020 Global Citizen Festival's scheduled Seoul date in September).	US
MT	Jan	26	1st Grammy Award performance	BTS, 62nd Annual Grammy Awards, all seven members performed with Lil Nas X, a new rendition of his hit "Old Town Road", a remix called "Seoul Town Road" that he recorded with RM; others joining the song's medley of other remixes were Billy Ray Cyrus, Diplo, Mason Ramsey and Nas.	US
MT	Jan	28	2nd time guests on The Late Late Show with James Corden	BTS, perform their new release "Black Swan" and interview with host.	US
IN	Jan	31– present	K-pop affected by COVID-19 pandemic	After 11 confirmed cases were reported in South Korea, acts started adjusting live schedules in Southeast Asia, followed by international scheduling. Billboard compiled a continual "updating" list on February 26 of COVID-19 pandemic postponed and cancelled concerts from January to present; including some for K-pop artists: BTS, Seventeen, Taeyeon, GFriend, Got7, Twice, NCT Dream, Stray Kids, Momoland, Ha Sung-woon, rock band No Brain.	KR
CH	Feb	3	Chart-breaking record at #1 on Social 50 chart	BTS, #1 all-time artists with most non-consecutive weeks, 164 (chart dated February 8), 173 total weeks on chart since October 2016, Justin Bieber (record holder since March 2011) is behind at 163 weeks at #1. Also, at #1 for consecutive weeks since the chart dated July 29, 2017, "the first act in the Social 50’s nine-year history to rule for 100 straight weeks, 150 straight weeks and for an entire calendar year (2018 and 2019)".	US
O	Feb	9	Group performs at Oscars afterparty	A.C.E, 92nd Academy Awards afterparty for winning South Korean film Parasite at Los Angeles' Soho House, held by CJ Entertainment and Neon.	US
MT	Feb	11	3rd boy group performs on Jimmy Kimmel Live!	SuperM, in their first live U.S. TV debut, perform "Jopping" and "Dangerous Woman".	US
F	Feb	21	Album wins best new music release poll	BTS, Map of the Soul: 7, wins a weekly fan poll over releases by The Weeknd, Selena Gomez and Taylor Swift.	US
CH	Feb	23	3rd group in top five on Billboard 200	#5, Monsta X's All About Luv (chart dated February 29), after BTS (three #1s) and SuperM (one #1).	US
MT	Feb	24	1st artists perform in Grand Central Station	BTS, as the chief guests of The Tonight Show Starring Jimmy Fallon (2nd time on show), they were interviewed and played games on the New York City Subway, visited Katz's Delicatessen and performed their new release "On" at Grand Central Station.	US
IN	Feb	25-27	K-pop continued affect by the COVID-19 pandemic	After nearly 1000 cases and 10 deaths in South Korea, postponements and cancellations continued: in the U.S. the Overpass Music Festival in Orange County, California and the Korea Times Music Festival where K-pop performances were lined up; in South Korea and Asia, several group's concerts (including Seoul dates for BTS), and the Korean Music Awards and The Fact Music Awards.	KR
MT	Feb	25	1st artists on Carpool Karaoke	BTS, join The Late Late Show with James Corden (3rd time on show) for a pre-recorded ride in a van where they sing and converse with the host, including a cover of Post Malone's "Circles" and the theme song from Friends.	US
F	Feb	27	Top overall YouTube premiere to date	BTS, "On", its second music video release with a "cinematic storyline", 1.54 million concurrent views.	O
CH	Mar	1	4th #1 album on Billboard 200	BTS, Map of the Soul: 7 (chart dated March 7), fourth #1 in about 1 year and nine months, along with Map of the Soul: Persona (2019), Love Yourself: Answer (September, 2018), and Love Yourself: Tear (June 2, 2018); just behind group acts The Monkees (1 year, 21 days), The Beatles (1 year, 5 months) and solo artist Future (1 year, 7 months). Including more top statistics, it is the tenth mostly non-English language #1: (BTS (total 4), SuperM (1), Andrea Bocelli (1), Il Divo (1), Josh Groban (1), Selena Gomez (1) and The Singing Nun (1).	US
CH	Mar	2	1st group with 3 songs in Top 10 Billboard Hot 100	#4, BTS, "On" (chart dated March 7), along with "Boy with Luv" feat. Halsey #8 (April 27, 2019) and "Fake Love" #10 (June 2, 2018); join soloist Psy's two top ten chartings. It is the twentieth non-English language song in the top ten for the chart's one hundred years' history and BTS are the only artists with three songs and Psy the only with two.	US
CH	Mar	3	Overall top group at #1 on Artist 100 chart	#1, BTS, (chart dated March 7), the return makes a total of six weeks at #1, last charting at #1 on May 25, 2019; a top record for duo/group, and second to Taylor Swift's 37 weeks since the chart began in 2014.	US
C	Mar	10	1st concert at a U.S. rodeo	NCT 127, Houston Livestock Show and Rodeo, performed a solo concert to about 62,000 fans at the NRG Stadium.	US
MT	Mar	16	1st artists on The Kelly Clarkson Show	Monsta X, perform "You Can't Hold My Heart" from their first all English album All About Luv.	US
CH	Mar	17	4th group in top five on Billboard 200	#5, NCT 127's Neo Zone (chart dated March 21), after BTS (four #1s), SuperM (one #1), Monsta X (one #5); combined with BTS (Map of the Soul:7, currently at #8) to make two K-pop albums in the top 10 for the same chart date.	US
C	Mar	25– present	Online events during COVID-19	K-pop artists were included on a Billboard continual "updating" list of livestreams and virtual concerts to watch from March to present: March 25, Golden Child's concert on YouTube. March 30, BTS perform "Boy with Luv" on The Late Late Show with James Corden's Homefest fundraising special (Facebook, Instagram and TV) from their practice room. April 18, SuperM joins Together at Home, a televised and online benefit concert for the COVID-19 pandemic organized by Lady Gaga, the World Health Organization and Global Citizen. SuperM is included in the six-hour live stream line-up prior to the TV show. April 18 and 19, BTS, Bang Bang Con, livestream concert on YouTube. April 25, SuperM, Beyond Live, virtual livestream concert on V Live. and Golden Child's concert on YouTube.	O
C	Apr	7	Group posts concert video of last year's Coachella performance	Blackpink's April 12, 2019 performance of "Ddu-Du Ddu-Du" on YouTube; they were the first K-pop girl group performers at Coachella which is normally held in April, but rescheduled for October 2020 due to the COVID-19 pandemic.	O
CH	Apr	11	Fans propel old album and singles to charts	BTS, 2 Cool 4 Skool, the group's debut album release on June 12, 2013, #12 World Albums (chart dated April 11). ARMY fans played a social media April Fools' Day joke touting the upcoming debut of a "new" boy band called BTS and revisited the group's debut music. Their debut single on the album, "No More Dream" jumped to #2 (prior peak #14) on the World Digital Song Sales chart and five more of its singles entered the chart for the first time: "Like" (#10), ""Intro: 2 Cool 4 Skool" (#18, featuring DJ Friz), "Interlude" (#22), "Skit: Circle Room Talk" (#23), and "Outro: Circle Room Cypher" (#24).	US
C	Apr	28	BTS postpones entire world tour	Map of the Soul Tour, after original Seoul dates starting on April 11 and subsequent North America dates were postponed, due to the COVID-19 pandemic.	O
B	May	1	Artists in Billboard's top weekly items	"13 Best Things That Happened in Music This Week", J-Hope's livestream performance of Toosie Slide and Lisa's high-booted legs from a performance video in memes.	US
MT	May	2	Artists awarded at Nickelodeon Kids' Choice Awards	BTS, Favorite Music Group award (also nominated for Favorite Global Music Star award, which Taylor Swift won), Nickelodeon’s Kids’ Choice Awards 2020: Celebrate Together, first remote awards' show for COVID-19.	US
F	May	22	Mixtape wins best new weekly music poll	Suga (Agust D), D-2, wins a weekly fan poll with "Rain on Me (Lady Gaga and Ariana Grande song)" coming in second.	US
O	May	28– June 4	K-pop artists support Black Lives Matter	After the murder of George Floyd, artists including Jay Park, Tiger JK, Eric Nam, Got7's Mark Tuan, CL, Day6's Jae Park, Amber Liu, Red Velvet's Yeri, Crush, Tiffany Young, PH-1, Minzy, Kard's B.M and Jiwoo, Zelo, DPR Live, Momoland members, Samuel, VIXX's Ravi, AleXa, Lee Hi, Kevin Woo, Dean, Dal Shabet's Park Subin, Hoya, Jessi, Code Kunst (producer), 2Z (K-pop/rock band), Miso (rapper/singer), Holland, and BTS.	O
O	June	2–	K-pop fans support Black Lives Matter online	K-pop fandoms clogged U.S. police apps and took over racist hashtags like “whitelivesmatter” and “WhiteOutWednesday” with K-pop memes.	O
O	June	6–7	2 million dollar donation to Black Lives Matter	BTS and Big Hit Entertainment donated 1 million dollars, which was reported on June 6, and ARMY fandom matched the donation by June 7 with another million for BLM and other organizations for racial inequality.	O
O	Jun	16	Death of K-pop group member at 28-years-old	Kim Jeong-hwan (Yohan), a member of TST, joined the group in 2017.	KR
O	June	20	K-pop fans focus on U.S. President's political campaign	K-pop fans joined TikTok users in an online no-show protest to bloat ticket requests for Donald Trump's Tulsa rally, which they did not attend.	US
F	Jun	29	Top overall YouTube premiere to date	Blackpink, "How You Like That" (released June 26), 1.66 million concurrent views; and top overall 24-hour music video debut with 86.3 million views.	O
F	Jul	8	Group in top subscribed YouTube channels	Blackpink, #6 in YouTube's history, over 40 million subscribers, second female act and first non-English-speaking act; following Justin Bieber, Marshmello, Ed Sheeran, Eminem and Ariana Grande.	O
F	Jul	9	Billboard K-pop cover wins award	ASME Readers' Choice Award for best entertainment and celebrity cover, "Blackpink Meets the Red, White and Blue" (March 2, 2019).	O
B	Jul	15	Groups in Billboard's best boy band album picks	"The 30 Best Boy Band Albums of the Past 30 Years: Staff Picks", #3, BTS, The Most Beautiful Moment in Life: Young Forever (2016), #11, Seo Taiji and Boys, Seo Taiji and Boys (1992), #17, Big Bang, Made (2015), #21 H.O.T., We Hate All Kinds of Violence (1996), and #26, BTS, Map of the Soul: 7 (2020).	US
MT	Aug	20	4th boy group performs on Good Morning America	SuperM, their new single "100", in their debut on a U.S. morning TV show, via a video from Seoul.	US
F	Aug	23	Top overall YouTube premiere to date	BTS, "Dynamite" (released August 21), more than 3 million concurrent views; and top overall 24-hour music video debut with 101.1 million views.	O
B	Aug	27	Artists on Billboard's top 100 MV artist's list	"The 100 Greatest Music Video Artists of All Time: Staff List", including their MTV classic mv and one YouTube pick: #37, Girls' Generation, "Gee" and "Paparazzi", #52, Red Velvet, "Red Flavor" and "Wish Tree", and #74, BTS, "DNA" and "Not Today".	US
MT	Aug	30	1st group performance at MTV VMA show and 2nd time winners	BTS, 2020 MTV Video Music Awards, performed "Dynamite" in front of a green screen from South Korea with New York City locations in the background and won all four awards they were nominated for: "Best Group" (Blackpink and Monsta X were also nominated in this category) and for their song "On" won "Best Pop", "Best Choreography", and "Best K-pop". Blackpink's "How You Like That" won "Song of the Summer".	US
CH	Aug	31	1st #1 on Billboard Hot 100 chart	BTS, #1, "Dynamite" (chart dated September 5), released at midnight on August 21. To date, they also have four #1 albums on the Billboard 200 chart, the highest record at #1 for 194 weeks on the Social 50 chart and four #1 songs on the Digital Song Sales chart. "Dynamite" had the highest weekly digital sales for a group since Prince and The Revolution's 1984 "Purple Rain" (May 14, 2016). Hot 100 chart statistics include: Their fourth single in the top ten with a total of twelve on the chart; Top K-pop act, besting Psy's #2 "Gangnam Style" (seven weeks in October - November 2012); Top Asian act since Kyu Sakamoto's #1 "Sukiyaki" (June 1963) and Far East Movement's #1 "Like a G6" (October - November 2010); 43rd #1 overall debut on chart	US
F	Sep	4	Most commented YouTube video to date	BTS, "Dynamite" (posted August 21), more than 6.5 million comments (to date) and beating their own record with "DNA" (over 6.2 million to date) and Psy's "Gangnam Style" (over 5 million to date).	O
CH	Sep	8	1st girl group in top 20 on Billboard Hot 100 chart	Blackpink and Selena Gomez, #13, "Ice Cream" debut (chart dated September 12), released on August 28. Also debuted at #2 on the Digital Song Sales chart, #8 on Streaming Songs, and #32 and the group's first time on Mainstream Top 40.	US

== See also ==
- Timeline of K-pop at Billboard
- List of K-pop on the Billboard charts
- List of K-pop albums on the Billboard charts
- List of K-pop songs on the Billboard charts
- List of K-pop on the Billboard year-end charts
- Korea K-Pop Hot 100
- Billboard K-Pop Artist 100
- List of K-pop artists
- List of South Korean idol groups
