= Billboard K-Town =

Online magazine column about K-pop

- Current Billboard logo.

- Screenshot of Billboard K-Town column launch
- Type: Music column
- Format: Graphics, text, videos
- Owner: Billboard
- Staff writers: Jeff Benjamin
- Founded: January 29, 2013
- Language: English
- Headquarters: New York City, New York, U.S.
- Circulation: Online
- Website: www.billboard.com/k-pop

Billboard K-Town is an online magazine column presented weekly, on various days, by Billboard on its Billboard.com site. The column, launched on January 29, 2013, reports on K-pop music; artists, concerts, chart information and news events. Billboard and its website had reported on K-pop for a number of years, following the evolution of K-pop, increasing the number of articles with the spike in 2009, and finally culminated in a column specifically for the genre after Psy's July 2012, "Gangnam Style" hit made K-pop history and doubled online viewership. K-Town was created as part of the popular music publication's website relaunch, with new features for fans, and the goal of providing more on-site reporting of festivals, award shows, and other major music events.

== History ==
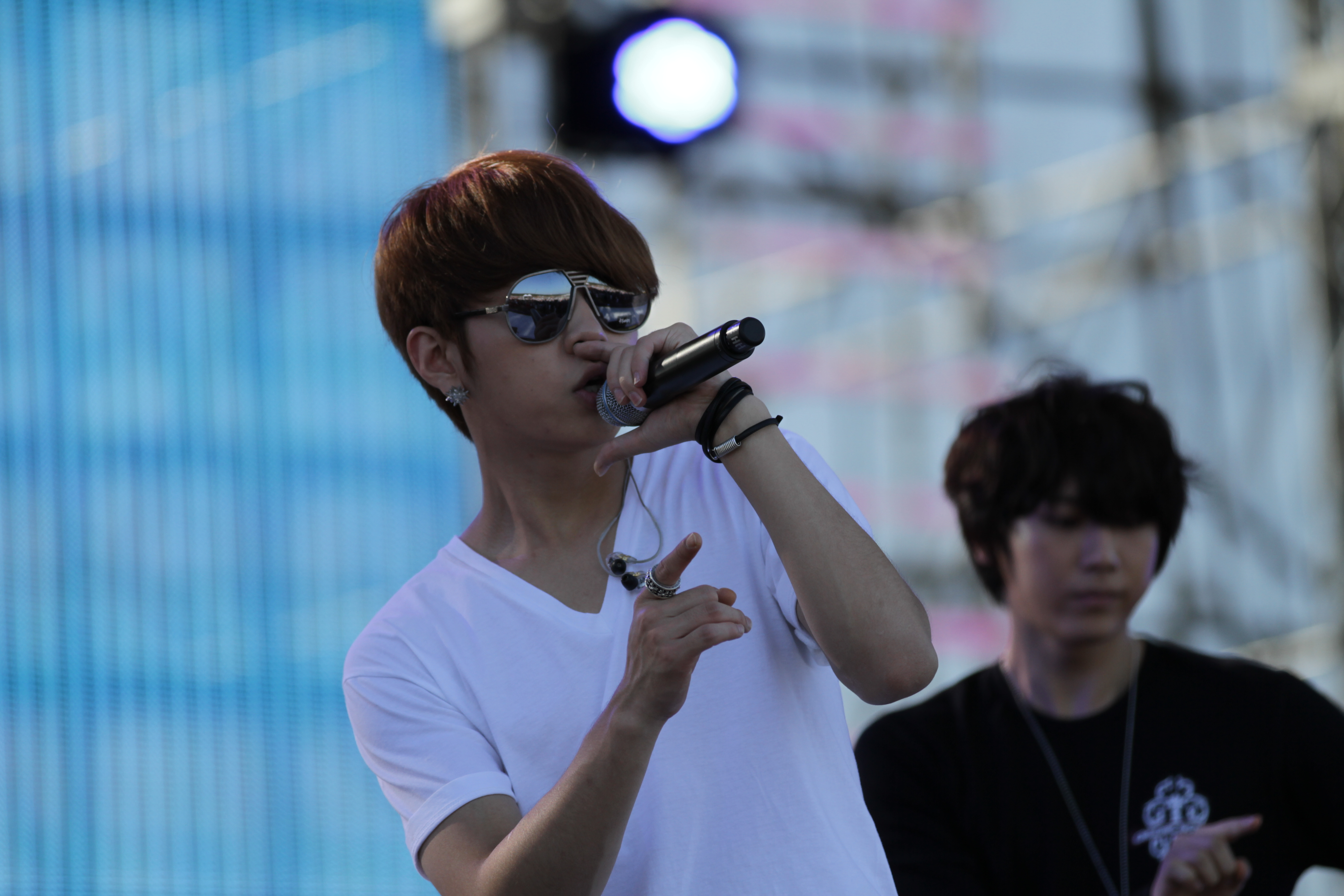
Beast's Junhyung and Hyunseung, "Fiction" KBS concert rehearsal, 29th New York Korean Festival, Overpeck County Park, October 9, 2011.

=== Beginnings, 2009–2012 ===
In the fall of 2009, some of Billboard's earliest online K-pop coverage included articles of the first K-pop artists to chart on the Billboard Hot 100, the Wonder Girls, who debuted at No. 76 with "Nobody", including a feature of their stay in the U.S. and their tour opening for Jonas Brothers. In 2009, according to statistics from Google Trends, online searches for K-pop began their steady increase, after the release of two smash hit singles, Super Junior's "Sorry, Sorry" and Girls' Generation's "Gee".

In 2010, the Wonder Girls were featured as the first K-pop artists on Billboard's annual showcase "21 under 21". Later that year, Billboard invited the first K-pop artists to their New York studio, where JYJ performed "Ayyy Girl" and "Empty" from their album The Beginning, and in December, Billboard's readers put the album on the Billboard Readers' Poll "Your Fave Album Of 2010".

Billboard reported that the South Korean music industry grossed nearly $3.4 billion during the first half of 2011, and Time recognized K-pop as "South Korea's Greatest Export". On August 25, 2011, Billboard and Billboard Korea launched the Billboard Korea K-Pop Hot 100 chart, ranking digital sales of the country's top songs and mobile downloads, and modeled on its Billboard Hot 100 and other Asian charts. Sistar's song "So Cool" was the first to top the chart. On November 25–26, 2011, Billboard Korea hosted the "2011 Billboard K-Pop Masters, presented by MGM Grand" inside the MGM Grand Garden Arena in Las Vegas. The line-up included TVXQ, 4Minute, G.NA, MBLAQ, Sistar, Beast, Shinee, and Brown Eyed Girls. The MGM Grand said the event would serve as "an opportunity to showcase the appeal of K-pop music as one of the fastest-growing musical trends around the world."

Psy's July 2012 hit, "Gangnam Style", took "the genre to the top of western charts," and made K-pop history. His success reached beyond the Korean-American community, and doubled online viewership, according to Google data. But, not everyone was happy with the song's success on the Billboard charts, especially with its No. 1 spot on the new Hot Rap Songs chart; it reached No. 2 on Billboard Hot 100. Critics said the October 2012 change in the way the magazine tallied their charts, which included digital sales, online streams and radio airplay, gave stars with a pop-oriented sound and broad crossover appeal an advantage over other artists. Later in the year, CNN noted that Billboard's 2012 "annual series of top 21 musicians under the age of 21" listed K-pop star IU at 15th on a list which included heavyweights in the western music business such as Miley Cyrus and Justin Bieber."

=== 2013–present ===
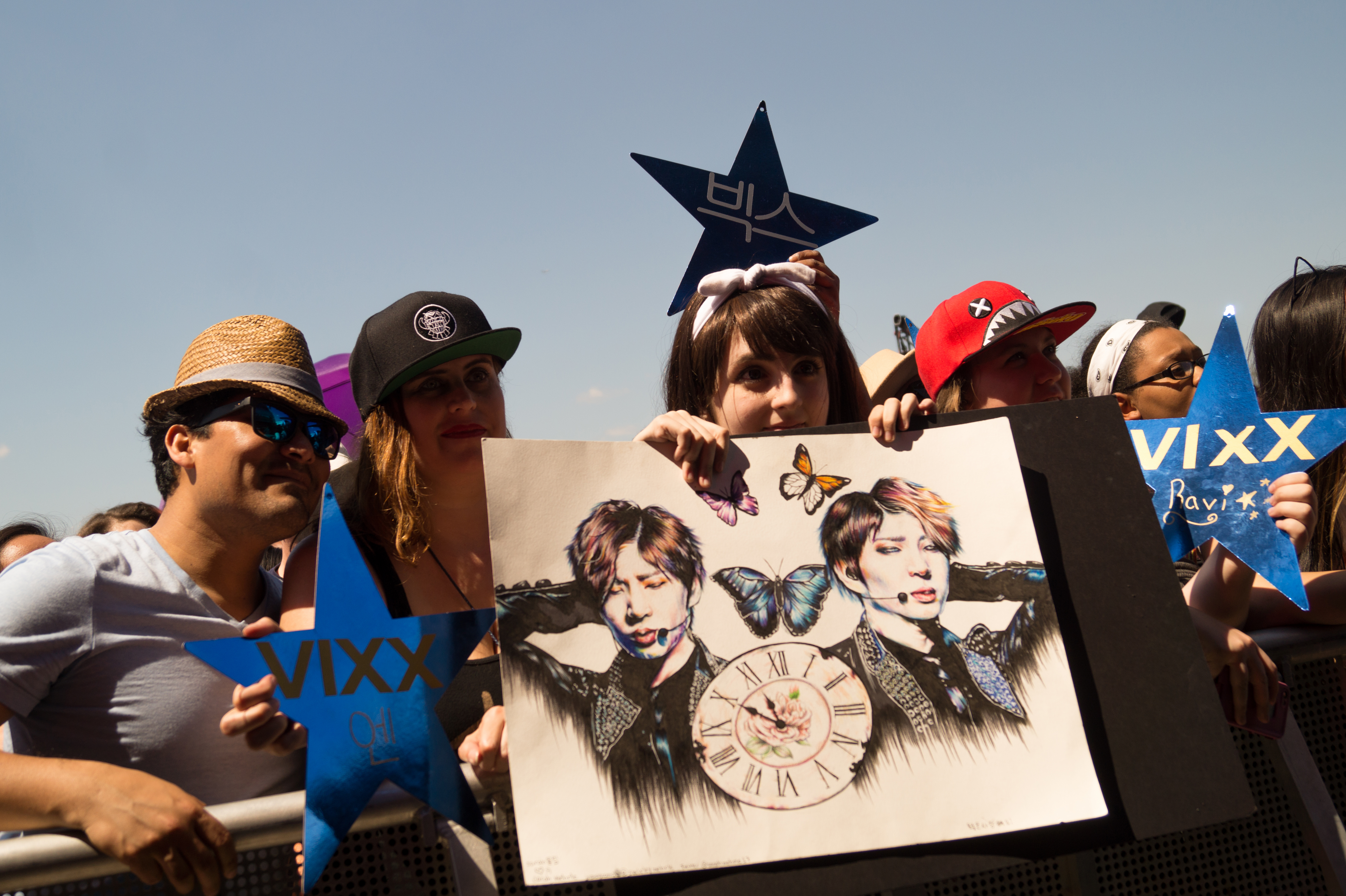
VIXX fans, Global Citizen Earth Day concert, National Mall, April 18, 2015

==== Web presence and K-Town launch ====
In January 2013, Billboard relaunched its websites with new features, including "enhanced content for fans" on its consumer site Billboard.com, with the intent to provide more on-site reporting of festivals, award shows, and other major music events. Billboard's website is one of the most popular music publications online, and in 2013 comScore reported an average of 3.3 million visitors a month in the United States, just after Rolling Stone, and followed by Pitchfork and Spin. A year and a half later, in 2014, the site had 13 million unique viewers for the month of August, and combined with totals for its sister publication, The Hollywood Reporter, the Guggenheim Media Entertainment Group placed as the fourth most popular entertainment website, behind TMZ, E! Online and People.com. In addition to the U.S. based website, Billboard has business operations in South Korea, home of K-pop.

The relaunch included a new column, "K-Town", in a move to bring K-pop news, songs and music videos to its readers each week. Girls' Generation welcomed the column with a video greeting, and the first column article was a feature on "rising K-pop superstars" Infinite. In April 2013, The Korea Herald said, "the effect of YouTube and the Billboard chart cannot be ignored in the international success of Psy's "Gangnam Style"," and "Billboard's recent interest in K-pop is not a fleeting phenomenon."

By July 2013, a year after "Gangnam Style", Billboard reported a continued surge and Psy's scoring again with a new hit, "Gentleman". According to Google, 91% of viewership on top K-pop channels was then coming from outside the Asia-Pacific region, as compared to less than half in 2011. Billboard provided a "Top 10 K-Pop Hits Post-Gangnam Style" (Psy's "Gentleman", Girls' Generation's "I Got a Boy", Hyuna's "Ice Cream", G-Dragon's "Crayon", G-Dragon's "One of a Kind", G-Dragon's "That XX", Girls' Generation's "Oh!", Beast's "Beautiful Night", Girls Generation's "Flower Power", and Kara's "Pandora"); and credited the two groups, Girls' Generation and Big Bang, as major acts that had cultivated large international followings. At the end of the year, David Bevan of The Washington Post described the "distinctly fervent (and always online) K-pop fan network."

At the start of 2014, in a special to The Globe and Mail, music critic J. D. Considine wrote, "Perhaps it's a mistake, then, to think of the Korean Wave as a massive tsunami. Instead, it seems more like a steady flow, rising slowly but steadily seeping in." He quoted K-Town columnist Jeff Benjamin, "K-Pop lives and breathes online," and "That's why it's been able to cross into mainstream consciousness." At year's end, Janice Min, co-president and chief creative officer of the Guggenheim Media Entertainment Group overseeing The Hollywood Reporter and Billboard said, "The world is getting more and more interested in Hallyu content", and "We cover a lot of Korean content at Billboard, I would say almost obsessively." K-Town's 2014 coverage included "Gangnam Style" breaking YouTube's video view counter in December, with more than 2.15 billion views, forcing them to upgrade, and the first K-pop artist on Rolling Stone's year-end list, 2NE1's Crush at No. 6 on the "20 Best Pop Albums of 2014".

The "Billboard Korea" website at Billboard.co.kr, refreshened its image and relaunched on December 20, 2017, and included the K-Pop Hot 100 chart's weekly updates.

A January 2019 website analysis by Alexa Internet found that almost half of the visitors to Billboard.com were from the U.S. The top keyword searches sending traffic to the site were the Billboard Hot 100 chart (1.5 percent), the K-pop group BTS (.41 percent), and Billboard "top 100" and "country songs", respectively (.38 percent). The top sites linking in were the Chinese-based baidu.com and sina.com.cn, and South Korean-based naver.com.

==== K-pop media source ====
As a media focal point for K-pop information, in 2016 alone, K-Town columnist Benjamin participated in K-pop conferences and media inquiries about K-pop's status in America. In February, he spoke on a Boston University College of Arts and Sciences' panel, "Music & Media: Korean Pop Industry", which included issues about K-pop's fit with Western culture and the Korean entertainment industry's close scrutiny of media interviews. In June, at KCON NY, he told NBC News Stephany Bai that K-pop was gaining global fans while retaining its "distinctive characteristics". He credited its continued success with things like accessibility on social media, song titles in English on YouTube, and an ability to involve fans in what he called K-pop's "scene" rather than a genre, which involves them in a "whole different world". In July, with almost 190 foreign reporters registered to cover KCON LA, he told Korea Times reporter Si-soo Park, "K-pop is getting closer to the mainstream", and mentioned its coverage by major news outlets like The New York Times and others. In November, he contributed K-pop analysis for a Time report on artists CL, Eric Nam, and Dean's attempts to enter the mainstream music market in America.

== Chart information ==
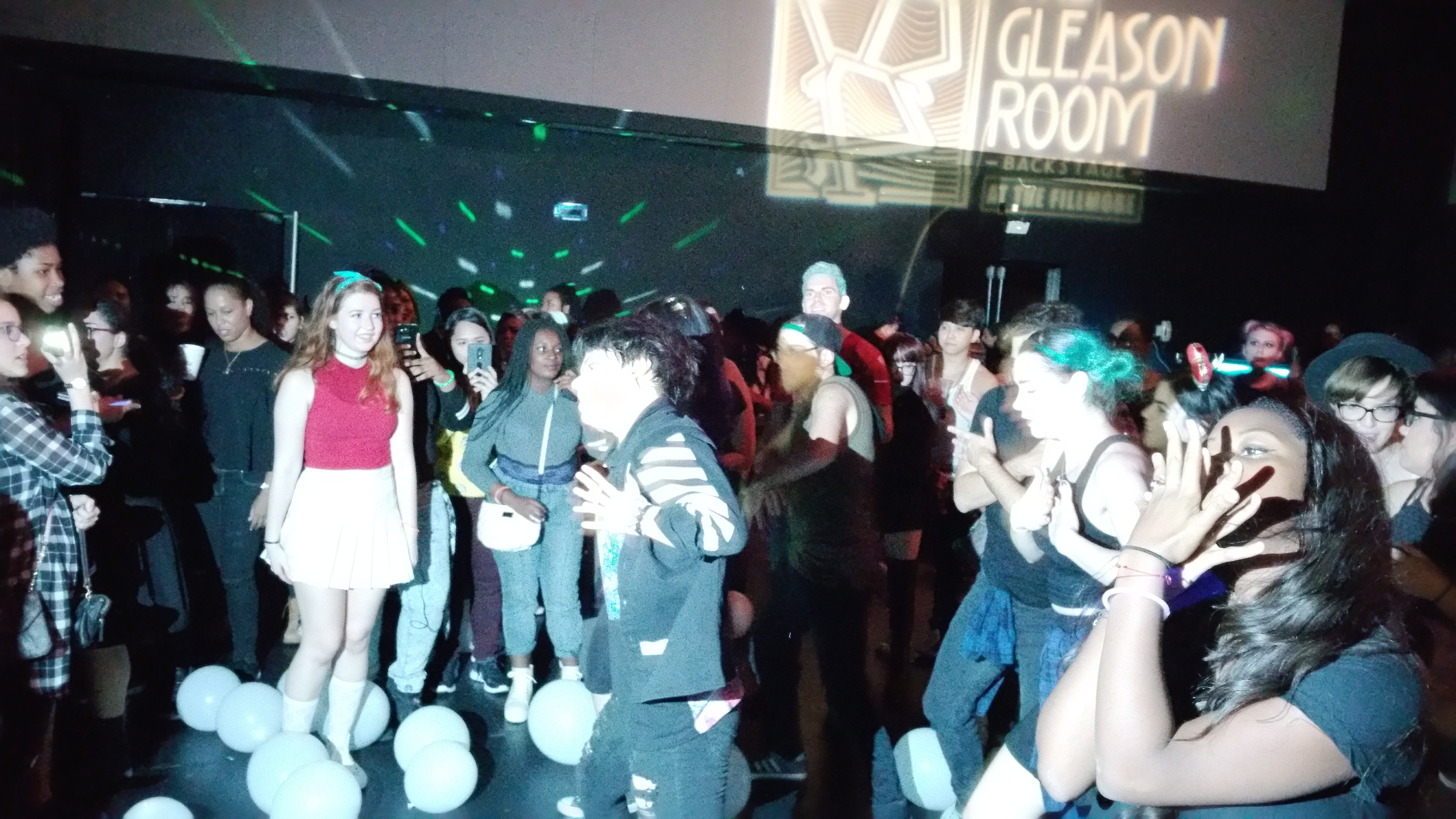
Local K-pop dance teams vie at Kaja Kon dance/concert, Miami Beach Convention Center, The Gleason Room Backstage, October 30, 2016

=== Lists of K-pop on the Billboard charts ===
The Korea K-Pop Hot 100 chart was discontinued in the U.S. in May 2014, and reestablished on Billboard.com as of the chart dated December 30, 2017.

K-Town continued to follow K-pop artists' top and first-time K-pop ratings on all Billboard charts, with chart reports and features watched closely and rehashed by South Korean media and others internationally. The column, also, reports on YouTube's views in the U.S. and around the world.

Some early examples were: Billboard Twitter Real-Time "Trending 140", Psy's "Hangover" featuring Snoop Dogg reached No. 1 in late June 2014, and a No. 1 and K-pop's first time for Infinite with "Last Romeo" in September 2014, on the Billboard Twitter Real-Time "Emerging Artists" chart. Some other chart firsts included Got7 receiving a No. 2 on the Social 50 chart and a No. 45 on the Artist 100 chart in April 2016 and in October 2016, BTS receiving a No. 1 on the Social 50 chart (joining Psy's record) and a top K-pop artist scoring of No. 16 on the Artist 100 chart. Additionally in 2016, BTS's Wings charted at No. 26 on Billboard 200 and No. 19 on Canadian Albums chart, setting records for K-pop on the charts; new girl group Blackpink became the fastest act to hit No. 1 on the World Digital Song Sales chart with "Boombayah", and CL's English language song "Lifted" charted at No. 94 on Billboard's Hot 100.

In 2017, one group, BTS, began "dominating charts in the way no Korean act has ever done before", having first charted on the Billboard 200 chart in November 2015, with The Most Beautiful Moment in Life, Part 2 at No. 171, and rising to a No. 7 debut for their October 2017 Love Yourself: Her. They, subsequently, topped the chart in June 2018, at No. 1 with Love Yourself: Tear, with the album's "Fake Love" debuting as the first for a K-pop group at No. 10 on the Billboard Hot 100, and again in September 2018, with a No. 1 for Love Yourself: Answer. Their October 29, 2016, No. 1 on the Social 50 chart reached its 100th week on the chart dated November 17, 2018, and they became the "second artist overall, after Justin Bieber, to log a triple-digit stay at the top since the chart began in December 2010". In addition, they had more chart records for themselves on the social artist charts, and for their songs and albums, before, during, and after 2017.

There was an all-time high of ten albums on the Billboard 200 chart in 2018, BTS had three, including the two No. 1 chartings, and others were Blackpink, Exo, J-Hope, Jonghyun, NCT 127, RM and Lay (Exo member who is also a Chinese pop star). The Billboard Year-End charts showed BTS "breaking across genres" with multiple top and first-time K-pop chartings, and more K-pop charting for all artists, in general.

== Timeline of K-pop at Billboard ==
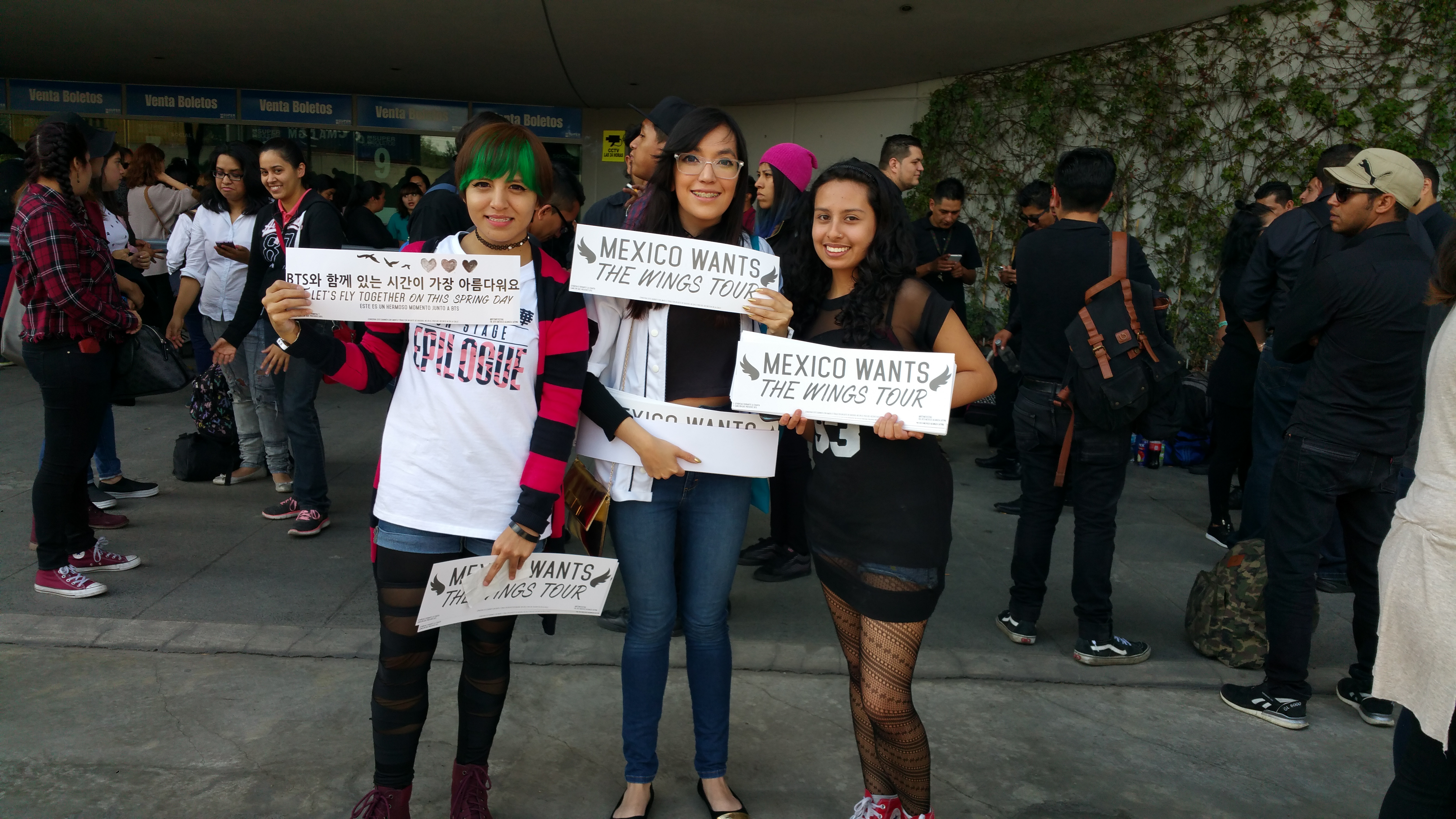
KCON Mexico City, BTS fans with banners asking for 2017 BTS Live Trilogy Episode III: The Wings Tour to come to Mexico, March 17, 2017.

K-Town documents K-pop history and events with features or announcements, or "timelines" of multiple events, such as Tamar Herman's 2017, "Timeline of K-Pop on U.S. TV, in Honor of BTS Attending Billboard Music Awards", and her 2018, "How BTS Took Over the World: A Timeline of The Group's Biggest Career Moments".

Earlier coverage, in 2015, included analysis of the future of K-pop in America and which groups might succeed. A watch was kept for collaborations of K-pop artists with mainstream American pop artists – March: "P.D.D", Rap Monster of BTS and Warren G; April: "The Heartbroken (Kpop Remix)", Wonder Girls' Yubin and Justin Thorne, previously of NLT; May: "Doctor Pepper", 2NE1's CL and Riff Raff and OG Maco, produced by Diplo; July: "Cash Money" Brave Brothers and YG featuring Krayzie Bone; and December: Psy released his album Chiljip Psy-da with tracks featuring will.i.am and Ed Sheeran. Also, in March 2015, at a major U.S. music festival, Miami's Ultra, CL performed Dirty Vibe, a 2014 release with Skrillex and Diplo (which she and G-Dragon featured on), then her own rap in Korean lyrics, during a performance with Sean Combs, which Benjamin called "a breakthrough moment for Korean music"; with echoes from Korean media.

The column includes articles about the attention K-pop artists receive from the film industry, Hollywood and American celebrities, like prior Billboard articles on Rain, his 2008 debut in the Hollywood film Speed Racer, and appearance as a guest on The Colbert Report. K-Town shared multiple 2015 such articles: a TV station Nickelodeon aired a K-pop inspired show Make It Pop, BigBang's "Fantastic Baby" was played in the trailer of Pitch Perfect 2, Randy Jackson visited Epik High backstage, and Emma Stone told Conan's viewers she is obsessed with K-pop, saying it is "beyond excellent, it's the best thing you've ever seen", and her favorites were 2NE1 and Girls' Generation. In November 2015, Exo and Disney released "Light Saber", a song and music video for Star Wars: The Force Awakens. And the 2017, BTS inspired timeline, article included a K-pop group's first appearance, BTS at the Billboard Music Award show, along with a first nomination and win for the Top Social Artist award.

Some news just documented the disbandments of groups, like 2016's report: January – Kara, June – 4Minute, October – Rainbow, November – 2NE1. And, some articles provided K-pop analysis showing the interconnectedness with American music.

=== Industry news ===
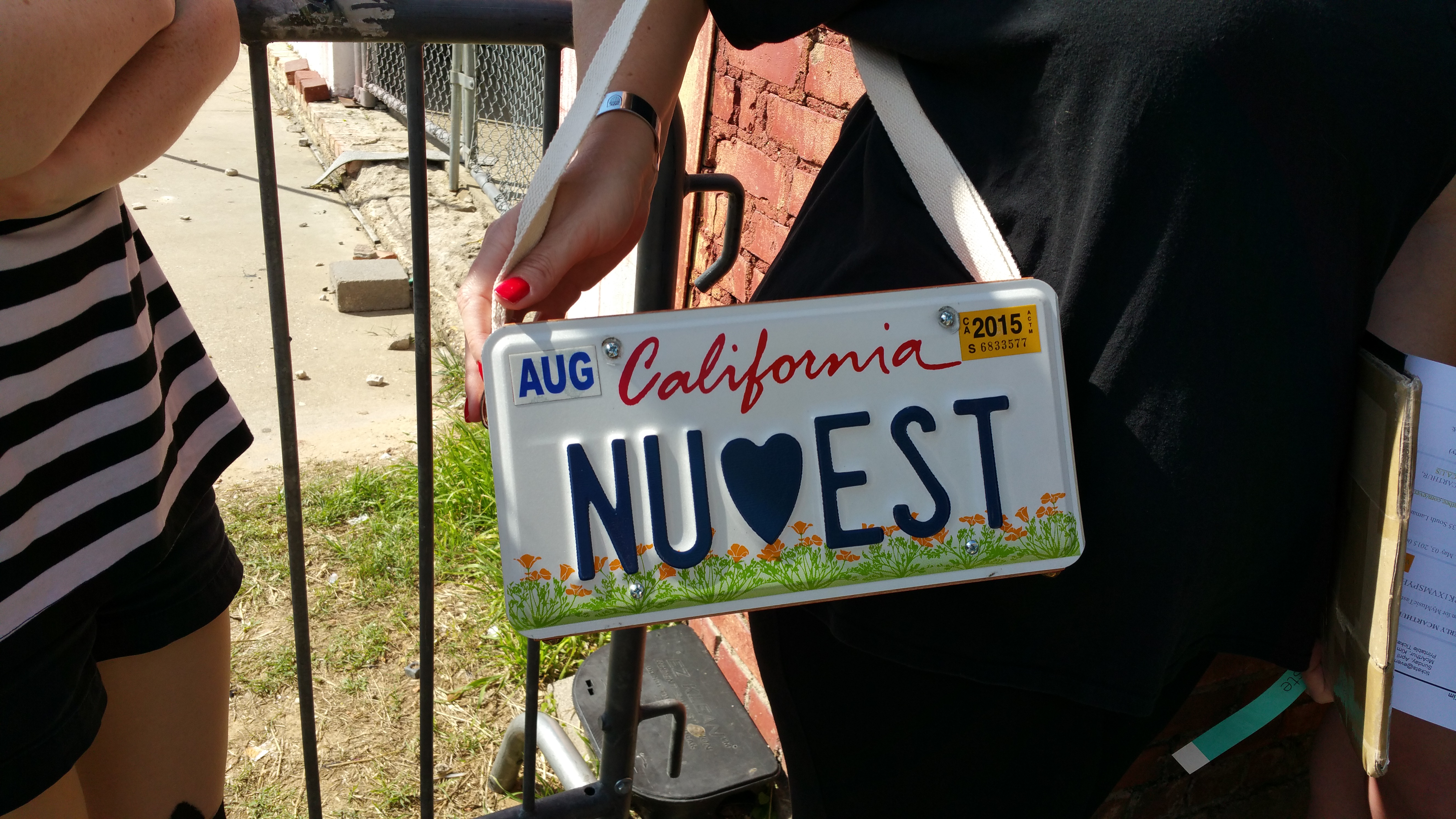
Nu'est fan purse, Gilley's Dallas, Texas concert, May 3, 2015

The K-pop industry news includes financial reports and growth. A June 2014 article discussed a study conducted by kickstarter website, MyMusicTaste.com, which looked at K-pop concert numbers and showed that the Wonder Girls 2010 U.S. tour accounted for 15 of the 18 concerts in North America for that year. After that, numbers ebbed to six in 2011, 13 in 2012, and 17 in 2013; with Super Junior, the largest touring act, first touring around Asia, then increasing tours to four continents in 2013.

Their 2015 article said that K-pop was doing well: an IFPI report showed South Korea still in the top 10 global music market rankings, having moved ahead of Brazil, at $266 million in trade value; the National Tax Service of South Korea said the average annual income for singers rose more than 72 percent since 2010; and overseas revenues growth, attributed to interest in Korea's pop culture, led by music and television dramas, nearly doubled in five years. Experts credited the jumps to more international album sales and tours, with 2014 the biggest year for K-pop concerts in America.

K-Town examined a new MyMusicTaste.com study in 2016, which found America was becoming a priority for touring Korean acts. The study was conducted while the site gauged local fan interest for future concerts and examined the number of K-pop concerts held between 2013 and approximately May 2016, which found that East Asia still had the most concerts, but their numbers were tapering, while North America, South America and Europe were showing consistent growth. The top three countries with the most concerts abroad were Japan, China and the U.S. The number one touring act in the study was the all-male group BigBang. which was reported, by Forbes, to have made $44 million in pretax earnings in 2015, compared to $33.5 million made by the current highest-paid American all-male arena pop group, Maroon 5 and were No. 54 on the Forbes Celebrity 100.

=== Reviews, interviews, and concert coverage ===
K-Town interviews K-pop artists when they visit the U.S. and occasionally in Seoul; and publish concert, tour, and musical release announcements and reviews. Some interviews are videotaped at Billboard's studio in New York City and include English language subtitles and performances by the artists.

In 2015, some concert reviews were – January: F.T. Island, April: Amoeba Culture's Dynamic Duo, Primary, Zion.T and Crush, June: Epik High and July: BTS, including their Billboard studio performance. Epik High added tour dates and became the biggest North American K-pop tour in years, and BTS sold-out VIP tickets were re-sold at more than $10,000. In October, K-Town reviewed the Newark concert of BigBang's six-city North American tour, after their Los Angeles concert scored in the top ten on "Billboard Hot Tours" with a sold-out boxscore earning; and did a November pre-concert interview with Block B. More coverage included the concerts and conference days for KCON 2015 in California again, and first time on the East Coast, including interviews with performers Red Velvet, Got7, Zion.T and Crush, Roy Kim, Monsta X, and AOA.

In 2016, interviews and concert coverage included Jay Park touring with AOMG, DEAN, Got7, Crush and a concert review of CL, all in NYC; and an interview with Tablo before Epik High's appearances at Coachella. K-Town again covered KCON in New York and L.A., including interviews with Ailee, Crush, Day6, Shinee, Amber, and Twice. And, for the first time, they covered a Canadian event, the Toronto Kpop Con.

In September 2018, Benjamin interviewed Got7 in Seoul, while attending the MU:CON music industry convention and watching newer acts like Hoya, N.Flying, Kim Dong-han, Dreamcatcher and A.C.E.

=== Fan-based polls and reports ===
In one of the voting contests sponsored by Billboard, the first K-pop win was BigBang's fans, the VIPs, who won the August 2014, Billboard Fan Army Face-Off, with 91% of the vote in the final round and second place going to Thirty Seconds to Mars fans, (with wins over Rihanna's fans in Round 1, Selena Gomez's fans in Round 2, Girls' Generation's fans in Round 3 and Skillet's fans in Round 4; with over 20 million votes cast.)

== Contributors ==
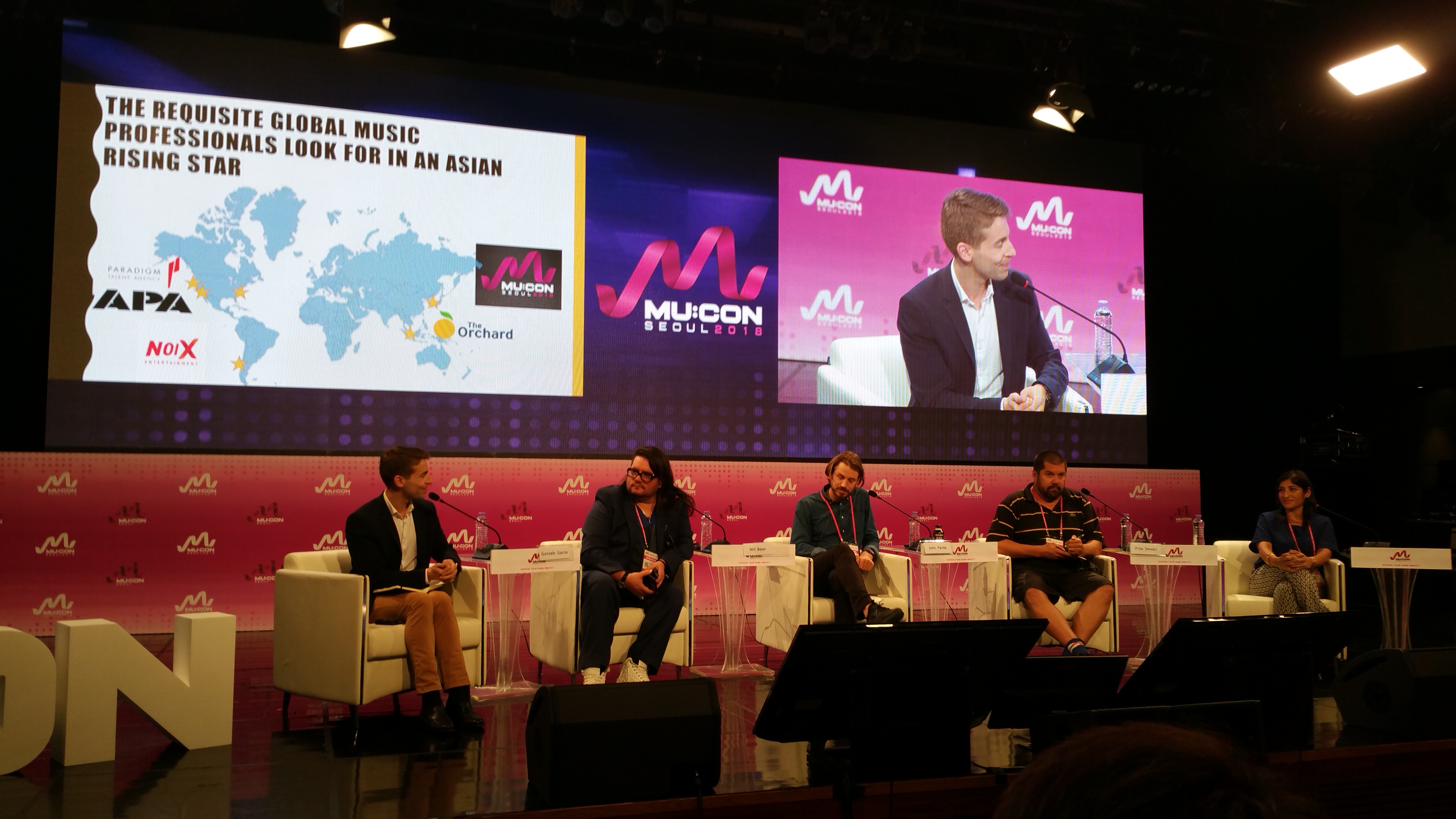
Jeff Benjamin, left and on-screen, hosting MU:CON Seoul 2018 panel on September 10.

Jeff Benjamin is K-Town's columnist and manager. Prior to K-Town's launch, Billboard included K-pop news and articles, written by Billboard and Billboard Korea staff, which included Benjamin. He is a music/journalism alumni of New York University, where he interned with Billboard and has contributed to other media featuring K-pop, including The New York Times, Rolling Stone, BuzzFeed, Nylon, CBS Radio, Fuse TV, Mnet America, Mnet TV America and Radio.com. For his K-pop journalism and his work at Billboard since 2013, he received the 2020 Korea Image Stepping Stone Bridge Award from the Corea Image Communication Institute (CICI), who said, "Benjamin did a great job of promoting K-pop overseas, being a bridge between Korea and the world."

Billboard Korea Editor-in-Chief Jessica Oak has also written K-pop articles for Billboard since 2012, then for K-Town when it was launched, along with other Billboard Korea staff from offices in Gangnam. Billboard pop correspondent Tamar Herman, a graduate of Macaulay Honors College in East Asian studies, has contributed articles, as of 2016, and is the primary K-pop correspondent.

== Readership and reception ==
In April 2013, The Korea Herald said, "the more Billboard talks about K-pop, the faster the speed of K-pop advancement in the U.S. will be."

As the primary K-pop correspondent, Herman represented Billboard through appearances such as Netflix & Vox's "Explained" K-pop episode. Herman also contributed to Forbes.com, NBC News, TeenVogue, Entertainment Weekly, South China Morning Post and Vulture, and authored the book "BTS: Blood, Sweat, & Tears", published in English in summer 2020, with contemporary translations in Japanese, Russian, and German.

As a K-Town columnist, Benjamin has been called upon for his opinions on K-pop from The New York Times, The Wall Street Journal, Entertainment Weekly, New York's Korea Society, Mnet America's Headliner series, Television in South Korea, NBC News, and Time, among others; and has appeared in panels for KCON, and Global Hallyu Forum 2013 Washington, D.C. South Korean media, including South Korea's own music chart's, Gaon Music Chart, has posted interviews and articles about Benjamin. K-Town articles have been re-phrased and quoted in media in the U.S., South Korea, and around the world.
