= Hello Bitches Tour =

2016 concert tour by CL

- Tour by CL
- Tour handbill
- Location: North America
- Start date: October 29, 2016
- End date: November 14, 2016
- Legs: 1
- No. of shows: 9

The Hello Bitches Tour (stylized as Hello Bi+ches Tour) was the debut concert tour of South Korean rapper and singer CL. The tour visited nine cities in 2016 in the United States and Canada, kicking off in New York City's Hammerstein Ballroom on October 29 and concluding in Toronto at the Sound Academy on November 14. The tour was promoted by SIVA Entertainment Group. The setlist consisted of her solo songs along with many of her previous works with K-pop girl group 2NE1.

== Background and development ==
On September 23, 2016, YG Entertainment announced that CL would hold her first American tour. She will visit nine cities in North America, with a total of nine shows. The tour's name derives from CL's 2015 Korean language single "Hello Bitches". The tour's announcement followed the release of CL's debut American single "Lifted" on August 19, amid news of an upcoming English-language debut EP. The sold-out show at the Hammerstein Ballroom made her the first Korean female singer to play a solo concert at a major venue in New York City. An unreleased music video of "Hello Bitches" was also played during the tour.

== Controversy ==
On November 7, fans and concertgoers had noticed that CL had been using the "controversial" version of her song "MTBD (Mental Breakdown)" since the tour started. CL apologized on her Twitter account stating that her "engineer [had] sent the old version for [the] tour". CL performed the alternative version for the later shows.

== Set list ==
1. "Fire" (Intro)
2. "Can't Nobody"
3. "Scream"
4. "I Am the Best"
5. "Come Back Home"
6. "I Don't Care (Reggae Ver.)"
7. "Gotta Be You"
8. "Falling in Love"
9. "Lonely"
10. "Missing You"
11. "If I Were You"
12. "I Love You"
13. "The Baddest Female"
14. "Doctor Pepper"
15. "Dirty Vibe"
16. "MTBD"
17. "Lifted"
18. "Hello Bitches"

Encore

1. "Do You Love Me"
2. "I Am The Best (Remix)"

== Tour dates ==
List of tour dates
Date	City	Country	Venue	Attendance
October 29, 2016	New York City	United States	Hammerstein Ballroom	3,500
October 31, 2016	Seattle	United States	Showbox SoDo	—
November 1, 2016	Vancouver	Canada	Vogue Theatre	—
November 3, 2016	San Francisco	United States	Warfield Theatre	—
November 4, 2016	Los Angeles	United States	Microsoft Theater	3,264
November 6, 2016	Dallas	United States	The Bomb Factory	—
November 8, 2016	Atlanta	United States	Center Stage	—
November 10, 2016	Chicago	United States	Chicago Theatre	1,506
November 14, 2016	Toronto	Canada	Sound Academy	—
