= Hello Bitches =

Single by CL
- Language: Korean; English
- Released: November 21, 2015
- Genre: Hip hop; electronic
- Length: 2:58
- Label: YG; School Boy
- Songwriters: Teddy Park; Lee Chae-rin; Danny Chung; Jean-Baptiste
- Producer: Teddy Park

CL singles chronology
"Doctor Pepper" (2015)	"Hello Bitches" (2015)	"Daddy" (2015)

Music video
- "Hello Bitches" on YouTube

"Hello Bitches" is a song by South Korean rapper and singer CL. It was first released through SoundCloud on November 21, 2015, under YG Entertainment and School Boy, before it was released as a digital single to streaming platforms in South Korea on December 5, 2015. The track was written by CL, along with Teddy Park, Danny Chung and Jean-Baptiste, with production handled by Park.

"Hello Bitches" is a hip-hop and electronic song with boastful lyrics about CL's luxurious lifestyle. The song was originally planned to be a collaboration with British rapper M.I.A., but was later reworked into a solo release. CL described it as a "street single" that would lead up to the release of her then-planned first solo album.

A dance performance video, choreographed by Parris Goebel, was uploaded to 2NE1's YouTube channel on November 21. She performed it live for the first time at the 2015 Mnet Asian Music Awards. CL shot an official music video for the song but it was never officially released. During CL's Hello Bitches Tour in 2016, she unveiled the unreleased music video.

== Background and development ==
CL worked on the song two to three years before its release. It was originally planned to be released as a collaboration single with British rapper M.I.A. with the title "Asian Bitches", but was later renamed to "Hello Bitches" as CL felt that the song might have been a little too "categorized" and "limiting".

== Release ==
"Hello Bitches" was first released on SoundCloud on November 21, 2015 and was distributed to iTunes on November 25. On December 5, the single was released in South Korea. Regarding the release of the song, CL told Noisy's Jakob Dorof: "it's not an official single but more of a street single. I wanted to give a little surprise video to excite the fans who have been waiting while I prepare for my solo album. Since I am Korean, it's a good way of presenting me and it's for everyone around the world to see where I am from and to keep it authentic."

Musically, "Hello Bitches" is as an intense, ferocious and playful hip hop and electronic track that features "tough-talking raps in both English and Korean". It has been described as a song that embodies CL's swag and charisma, featuring instrumentations of synthesizers, a heavy 808 bassline, and a strong trap hip-hop beat as the main axis.

== Reception ==
Christina Lee of Idolator praised the song, writing "it's as assertive as CL has ever sounded, with its schoolyard taunts at the hook and barbs rapped in Korean and English about how she rules the world." Writing for Dazed, Taylor Glasby ranked the song number 12 in their list of The top 20 K-Pop tracks of 2015, writing that "it booms with YG Entertainment's signature Middle Eastern sounds and off-the-scale bass, with CL's commanding presence". Furthermore, Glasby asserted that "it's an aggressive, effective show of strength that no other female K-Pop star could do quite like Chaerin Lee does." Commercially, the song performed moderately in South Korea, peaking at number 21 on the Gaon Digital Chart and number 18 on the component download chart, and sold 238,000 digital units by February 2016.

== Music video ==
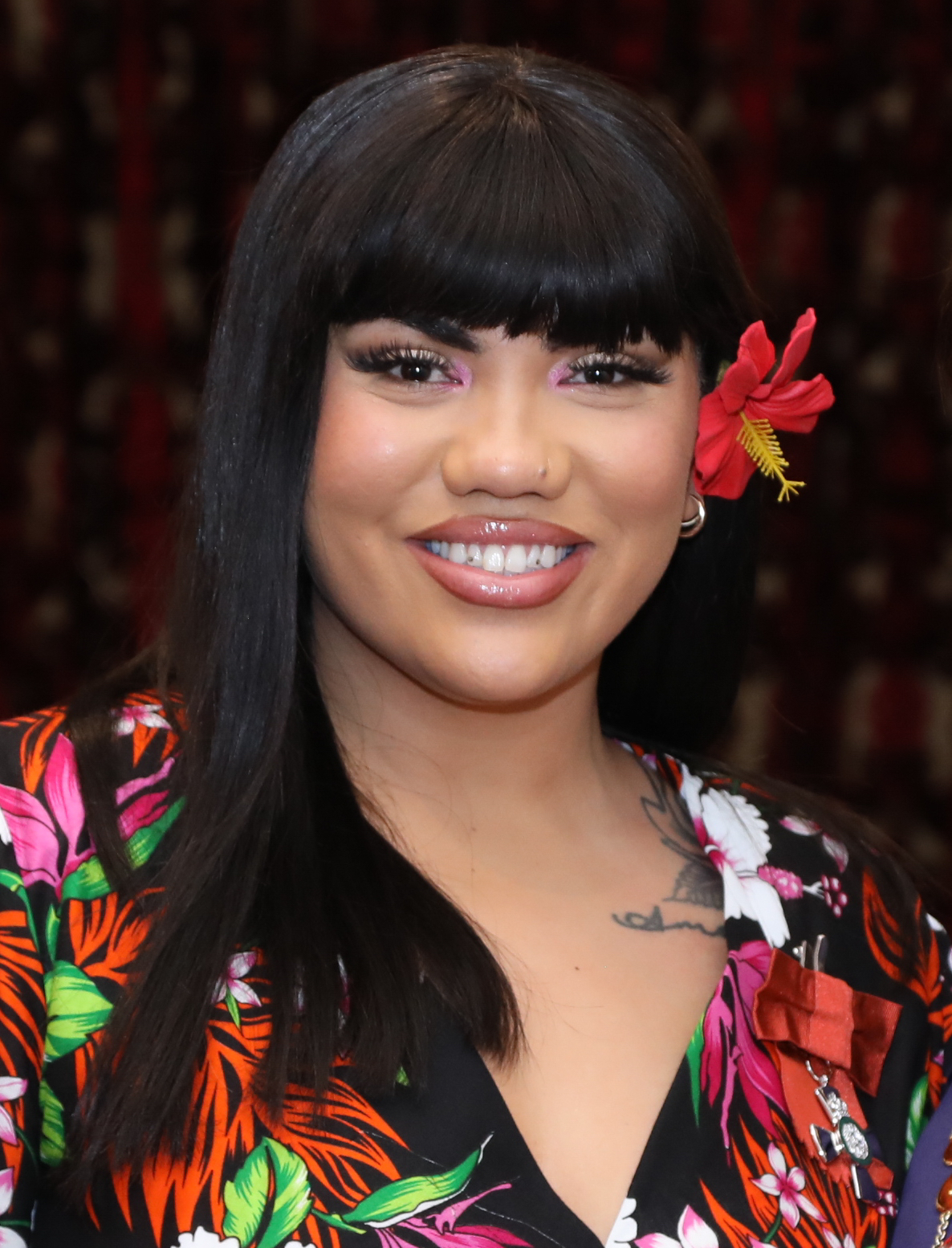
Parris Goebel served as the director and choreographer for the dance video.

A dance performance video for the song was uploaded to 2NE1's official YouTube channel on November 21, 2015. Filmed at WarehouseLA in Los Angeles, it was choreographed and directed by Parris Goebel, who had previously worked with artists such as Justin Bieber, Rihanna, and Nicki Minaj; additionally, she choreographed the songs "Bang Bang Bang" and "Ringa Linga" by YG Entertainment labelmates Big Bang and Taeyang, respectively. The video was filmed in one day and features Goebel and her ReQuest Dance Crew as backup dancers. Andrew Unterberger of Spin praised the video's lively energy and called the choreography impressive.

There was an unreleased music video for the song, which was shown in the Hello Bitches Tour, but was never uploaded online officially.

== Live performances ==
CL performed the song live for the first time at the 2015 Mnet Asian Music Awards in Hong Kong on December 2, along with CL's first solo single "The Baddest Female" and 2NE1 songs "Fire" and "I Am the Best", where she was joined by the rest of the members of 2NE1 as a surprise performance. Following the release of her next single "Lifted" in August 2016, YG Entertainment announced that CL would embark on her first headlining tour, titled the Hello Bitches Tour. The North American tour saw shows in nine cities across the United States and Canada. The tour kicked off on October 29, 2016 at the Hammerstein Ballroom in New York City and concluded at the Sound Academy in Toronto on November 14.

== Credits and personnel ==
Credits adapted from Melon.

Personnel

- Lee Chae-rin – vocals, lyricist
- Teddy Park – lyricist, composer, arranger
- Jean Baptiste – composer, lyricist
- Danny Chung – lyricist

== Charts ==
=== Weekly charts ===
Chart performance for "Hello Bitches"
Chart (2015)	Peak position
South Korea (Gaon)	21

=== Monthly charts ===
Chart performance for "Hello Bitches"
Chart (2015)	Position
South Korea (Gaon)	33

== Release history ==
Region	Date	Format	Label	Ref.
Various	November 21, 2015	Digital download; streaming	YG	
South Korea	December 5, 2015	Digital download; streaming	School Boy	
