= Blvk Phil Collins =

BLVKPHILCOLLINS

EP by OG Maco
- Released: September 20, 2016
- Genres: Hip-hop; trap
- Label: OGG
- Producers: Maco Mattox (exec.); DJ Snake; Andrew Grossman; Cla$$; Germ; Hassan Khaffaf; HEROES x VILLAINS; Hush; Luhvy; MeloMayneNoGamz; MyBoyRoach; Static Beats

OG Maco chronology
OG Maco 2 (2014)	BLVKPHILCOLLINS (2016)	Children of the Rage (2016)

Blvk Phil Collins (stylized as BLVKPHILCOLLINS) is a seven-track EP by American rapper OG Maco. Named after the British musician Phil Collins, it was released September 20, 2016, by OGG.

== Track listing ==
No.	Title	Writer(s)	Producer(s)	Length
1.	"No Love"	Maco Mattox; Andrew Grossman	MeloMayneNoGamz; Grossman; OG Maco	5:28
2.	"RAGE!!"	Mattox; Daniel Pollard; Pete Held	HEROES x VILLAINS	4:13
3.	"Prayer Line" (featuring Theo Ferragamo)	Mattox; David Hassan Khaffaf; Grossman	Khaffaf; Static Beats; Grossman	3:48
4.	"2000s"	Mattox	MyBoyRoach	2:24
5.	"Talk Too Much"	Mattox	Hush	3:36
6.	"What's a Wallet?"	Mattox	Germ; Luhvy; Cla$$	2:01
7.	"Move"	Mattox; William Grigahcine; Alex Burnett	DJ Snake	3:50

Notes

- "Move" is a cover of DJ Snake's original song "Talk" featuring George Maple.
