= U Guessed It =

2014 single by OG Maco

Single by OG Maco
- Released: September 25, 2014
- Recorded: 2014
- Genre: Hardcore hip-hop; trap
- Length: 2:26 (single version); 3:30 (extended version)
- Label: Quality Control
- Songwriters: Benedict Ihesiaba; Brandon Ray Thomas
- Producer: Brandon Thomas

OG Maco singles chronology
"U Guessed It" (2014)	"U Guessed It (Remix)" (2014)

"U Guessed It" is the debut single by American rapper OG Maco. The song was released on September 25, 2014, by Quality Control Music and was written by OG Maco and produced by Brandon Thomas. The song peaked at number 90 on the US Billboard Hot 100.

The song found commercial success as a meme on Vine.

== Music video ==
The music video for "U Guessed It" was released on YouTube on August 28, 2014. Shot by directing duo GOLDRUSH, mostly using hand-held cameras in fast motion, the video shows OG Maco and his friends in a hotel.

=== Feud with Beyoncé ===
On Twitter, OG Maco stated that Beyoncé copied his concept in the video of "U Guessed It" for her "7/11" music video.

== Controversy ==
On February 4, 2015, OG Maco accused South Korean rapper Keith Ape of cultural appropriation, claiming Keith Ape and friends had mocked him by using Black stereotypes to sell music in their video of "It G Ma". Maco also claimed that they had stolen the basis for their track from his single "U Guessed It". As of August 13, 2015, OG Maco collects royalties from "It G Ma" and has since deleted his tweets regarding his accusations of cultural appropriation. Nonetheless, he declined an invitation to be a part of the later remix rendition of "It G Ma".

== Reception ==
On DJBooth.net, the song received 4.5 out of 5 stars.

== Commercial performance ==
The remix of U Guessed It peaked at number 90 on the Billboard Hot 100, marking OG Maco's first and highest single charting in the United States.

== Track listing ==
- Digital download
1. "U Guessed It" – 2:26
2. "U Guessed It (Extended Version)" – 3:29

== Remix ==
"U Guessed It (Remix)"

Single by OG Maco featuring 2 Chainz

from the album OG Maco (EP)
- Released: September 26, 2014
- Recorded: 2014
- Genre: Hip-hop
- Length: 3:29
- Songwriters: Benedict Ihesiaba, Brandon Ray Thomas, Tauheed Epps

OG Maco singles chronology
"U Guessed It" (2014)	"U Guessed It (Remix)" (2014)	"Doctor Pepper" (2015)

2 Chainz singles chronology
"Burnin' Up" (2014)	"U Guessed It (Remix)" (2014)	"Mama Ain't Proud" (2014)

After the release of "U Guessed It", OG Maco, with his label OGG and OG $AVAGE, released an official remix for "U Guessed It", featuring American rapper 2 Chainz. This remix helped "U Guessed It" to peak at number 90 on the US Billboard Hot 100 chart. The remix was included on his EP OG Maco.

== Charts ==
Chart (2014)	Peak position
US Billboard Hot 100	90
US Hot R&B/Hip-Hop Songs (Billboard)	27
US Hot Rap Songs (Billboard)	21
