= Alpha (CL album) =

- Digital cover

Studio album by CL
- Released: October 20, 2021
- Length: 34:39
- Languages: Korean; English
- Labels: Very Cherry; Sony
- Producers: Dave Hamelin; Baauer; Nick Lee; Ian Thomas; Freedo; Ryan Marrone; Donut; Paul Phamous; Hong Ji-sang; Rogét Chahayed; J Gramm; Sweater Beats; Alex T; Dan Henig; Retro Future; Mad Max; Kurtis McKenzie; Darnell Got It; Suburban Plaza; Mutungi; Tablo

CL chronology
In the Name of Love (2019)	Alpha (2021)

Singles from Alpha
- 1. "Spicy" Released: August 24, 2021; 2. "Lover Like Me" Released: September 29, 2021; 3. "Tie a Cherry" Released: October 20, 2021

Alpha is the first studio album by South Korean rapper and singer CL. It was released on October 20, 2021, through her label Very Cherry and Sony. Alpha marks CL's first studio album as a solo artist since her debut with 2NE1 in 2009. It was preceded by the release of several singles, including "Spicy" and "Lover Like Me".

== Background and production ==
In September 2020, CL released the music video for the intro to her upcoming full-length album Alpha, titled "Post Up". It was then announced that album would be preceded with the release of the songs "Hwa" and "5 Star". CL had originally intended for her full-length debut record to be released on November 30, 2020; however, it was later announced that the album's release would be postponed to the first half of 2021 in order to make further improvements. On August 13, it was announced that CL would release her album Alpha in October 2021. "Spicy" was first released on August 24, while "Lover Like Me" was released on September 29. "Tie a Cherry" was released on October 20.

== Composition ==
=== Music and concept ===
Writing for Billboard, Owen Meyers asserted that the release of Alpha "embraces her status as an outlier of the international pop scene, with hooky pop-R&B hybrids, avant-garde electronic touches and distorted, speaker-busting hip-hop that stand apart from the glossy acts for which she helped paved the way." In her May 2021 cover story for Allure, the magazine explained that album's meaning is twofold: "It’s about the alpha-female character she embodies, but it also suggests a new beginning", and added that "the songs will fill out CL’s superlative branding with personal flavor." Upon the album's release, CL said that "I didn’t have any features on this album because I wanted [to introduce] all the different characters of CL".

=== Songs ===
Identified as CL's return to the global stage, Tim Chan of Rolling Stone regarded the hip-hop track "Hwa" as a "sassy kiss-off" and a "declaration of independence". An "identity peace song"—as CL describes, the title embodies multiple meanings in both Korean and Chinese, including themes of fire, flower, change, and wealth. Stylistically, "Hwa" interpolates chants, slinky synths, and snappy snares into a booming bass line. The musical styles of "5 Star" heavily contrasts its counterpart; it is characterized as a slow-jam love-filled number that primarily features the singer's soft vocals in both Korean and English, and contains greater influences from pop music. The song's lyrical content revolves around love and the rollercoaster of emotions felt during a romantic relationship.

== Reception ==
Professional ratings
Review scores
Source	Rating
NME	4/5 stars
NPR	(positive)
The Quietus	(positive)
Rolling Stone	3.5/5 stars
Uproxx	(favorable)

NME's Carmen Chin gave Alpha a four out of five rating, where she complimented the album's musical styles, experimentation, and vocal delivery. Christina Lee from NPR said that "Years after she introduced herself as 'the Baddest Female,' she maintains her role as an 언니 (eonni), or the older sister, of this cross-cultural moment in today's pop music." Writing for Rolling Stone, Krstine Kwak wrote that although the themes presented in the album were comparable to CL's previous releases, "sonically, these tracks show a new side to her range, with a bigger focus on vocals, storytelling, and lyricism, adding to the rap capabilities she's shown over the years. Alpha solidifies a fresh start that won’t leave her old fans in the dust."

== Accolades ==
Awards and nominations
Year	Organization	Award	Result	Ref.
2021	Asian Pop Music Awards	Album of the Year (Overseas)	Nominated	
2021	Asian Pop Music Awards	Top 20 Albums of the Year (Overseas)	Won	
2021	Asian Pop Music Awards	Best Female Artist (Overseas)	Nominated	
2021	Asian Pop Music Awards	Best Producer (Overseas)	Nominated	
2022	Korean Music Awards	Best K-pop Album	Nominated	

Alpha on listicles
Publication	List	Rank	Ref.
Beats Per Minute	Top 50 Songs of 2021 (for "Spicy")	37	
Genius	Genius's 50 Best Albums Of 2021	48	
Idology	Top 10 Albums of the Year	Placed	
PopCrush	25 Best Pop Albums of 2021	Placed	
Rolling Stone India	10 Best K-Hip-Hop and R&B Albums of 2021	4	
South China Morning Post	25 Best K-pop Albums of 2021	10	
The Quietus	Top 100 Tracks of 2021 (for "Spicy")	64	
Uproxx	The Best Pop Albums of 2021	Placed	

== Track listing ==
Alpha track listing
No.	Title	Writer(s)	Producer(s)	Length
1.	"Spicy"	CL; Boniq; Holly; Fabian Mazur; Sokodomo	Baauer	3:14
2.	"Lover Like Me"	CL; Anne-Marie Nicholson; Freedo; Nafla; Cleo Tighe; Sarah Blanchard	Freedo; Nick Lee	2:58
3.	"Chuck"	CL; Kesington Kross; Boniq; Hamelin; Ian Thomas	Hamelin; Ian Thomas	3:11
4.	"Xai"	Ryan Marrone; CL; Dave Hamelin; Donut; Paul Phamous; Dyo	Donut; Marrone; Hamelin; Phamous	3:16
5.	"Let It"	CL; Boniq; Hong Ji-sang	Hong Ji-sang	3:05
6.	"Tie a Cherry"	Julia Allyn Ross; Sokodomo; Gino Bombrini; Kyan Palmer; Krysta Youngs; CL; Peter Chun; Lee	Chun; Lee	3:10
7.	"Paradise"	Taylor Ross; Starrah; Rogét Chahayed; Rahki; Quan; M.a.xxx; Stefano Maggiore; June; J Gramm; CL	Chahayed; J Gramm	2:47
8.	"My Way"	Sweater Beats; Hamelin; Dan Henig; CL; Alex T	Hamelin; Sweater Beats; Alex T; Dan Henig	3:27
9.	"Siren"	Retro Future; Mad Max; Kimbra; CL; Lee	Retro Future; Mad Max; Lee	3:15
10.	"Hwa"	CL; Jean-Baptiste Kouame; Tokki	Hamelin; Kurtis McKenzie	2:56
11.	"5 Star"	CL; Koko LaRoo; Kouame; Suburban Plaza; Tablo	Darnell Got It; Suburban Plaza; Hamelin; Mutungi; Tablo	3:20
Total length:				34:39

== Charts ==
=== Weekly charts ===
Weekly chart performance for Alpha
Chart (2021)	Peak position
Japanese Download Albums (Billboard Japan)	95
South Korean Albums (Gaon)	16
UK Independent Album Breakers (OCC)	18
US Top Current Album Sales (Billboard)	82
US World Albums (Billboard)	15

=== Monthly charts ===
Monthly chart performance for Alpha
Chart (2021)	Peak position
South Korean Albums (Gaon)	44

== Release history ==
Release dates and formats for Alpha
Region	Date	Format(s)	Label(s)	Ref.
Various	October 20, 2021	Digital download; streaming	Very Cherry	
Various	October 22, 2021	CD	Very Cherry	
South Korea	February 11, 2022	Vinyl	Very Cherry	
