= OG Maco (EP) =

EP by OG Maco
- Released: November 28, 2014
- Recorded: 2013–2014
- Genres: Hip-hop; trap; trap metal
- Labels: OGG; Quality Control Music
- Producers: Maco Mattox (exec.); PHRESH PRODUCE; Deko; Super Miles; deedotwill; OG Parker; Stroud; FKi; Brandon Thomas; Zaytoven; LeftHandMitch; CornerStone T; Ducko McFli; LC on the Traxx; Durdy Costello; Lex Luger

OG Maco chronology
Live Life 2 (2014)	OG Maco (2014)	Breathe (2015)

Singles from OG Maco
- 1. "FuckEmx3" Released: September 11, 2014; 2. "U Guessed It (Remix)" Released: September 26, 2014; 3. "Want More" Released: November 27, 2014

OG Maco is the eponymous third EP by American rapper OG Maco. It was released for free on November 28, 2014, by Quality Control Music and OGG. The EP features guest appearances from 2 Chainz, OG Brylan Kerr, JerZ, Migos, among others.

== Track listing ==
No.	Title	Writer(s)	Producer(s)	Length
1.	"All on Me" (featuring OG Brylan Kerr)	Maco Mattox	PHRESH PRODUCE; LC on tha Traxx	3:32
2.	"Want More"	Mattox; Grant Decouto	Deko	4:16
3.	"Seizure" (featuring JerZ)	Mattox; Lexus Arnel Lewis; Kenneth Williams	Lex Luger; deedotwill	3:03
4.	"FuckEmx3" (featuring Migos)	Mattox; Quavious Marshall; Kirshnik Ball; Kiari Cephus; Charles Singleton	Ducko McFli	5:16
5.	"RoadRunner" (featuring OG Junior)	Mattox; Brandon Thomas	Thomas	3:29
6.	"U Guessed It (Remix)" (featuring 2 Chainz)	Mattox; Thomas; Tauheed Epps	Thomas	3:31
7.	"12 Bricks"	Mattox; Trocon Markous Roberts; Steven Bolden	FKi	3:15
8.	"Been Thuggin'"	Mattox	Stroud	3:23
9.	"No Pressure"	Mattox; Xavier Dotson; Decouto; Joshua Parker	Zaytoven; Deko; OG Parker; OG Maco	2:23
10.	"CRU"	Mattox; Parker	OG Parker	4:25
11.	"2 Bars" (featuring ManManSavage)	Mattox; Decouto	Deko	3:32
12.	"Human Nature"	Mattox	LeftHandMitch; CornerStore T	4:26
13.	"Let's Get It" (featuring Johnny Cinco)	Mattox; Parker	OG Parker	3:33
14.	"Heat" (featuring Zuse)	Mattox	Durdy Costello	3:18
15.	"Undefeated" (featuring Zip K)	Mattox	Super Miles	4:00
Total length:				55:21

Sample credits

- "Undefeated" contains a sample of "Près Des Remparts De Séville" performed by Georges Bizet.
