= Lover Like Me =

Single by CL

from the album Alpha
- Released: September 29, 2021
- Genre: Pop; R&B
- Length: 2:58
- Label: Very Cherry
- Songwriters: Lee Chae-rin; Anne-Marie Nicholson; Freedo; Nafla; Cleo Tighe; Sarah Blanchard
- Producers: Freedo; Nick Lee

CL singles chronology
"Spicy" (2021)	"Lover Like Me" (2021)	"Tie a Cherry" (2021)

Music video
- "Lover Like Me" on YouTube

"Lover Like Me" is a song by South Korean rapper and singer CL from her debut studio album Alpha (2021). It was released through Very Cherry on September 29, 2021, as the second single from the album. "Lover Like Me" was written by CL, Anne-Marie, Freedo, Nafla, Cleo Tighe, and Sarah Blanchard, whilst production was handled by Freedo and Nick Lee.

== Background and composition ==
On September 17, four days after attending the annual Met Gala fashion event in New York City, CL announced via her social media platforms that her upcoming second single, titled "Lover Like Me", would be released on September 29. It was made available for digital download and streaming as the second single off of her debut studio album, Alpha.

Caitlin White from Uproxx commented that "'Lover Like Me' has the braggadocio of 'Spicy' but it's undercut with some of the softness of her pop sound." Teen Vogue's Jazmine Denise commented that it "will instantly trigger nostalgic feelings associated with early '00s R&B; it oozes self-confidence and sass as CL brazenly reminds an ex-lover that she’s one of a kind." Regarding its lyrical content, W Korea noted that "although it looks like a story about love, it can also be interpreted as a story about CL as a musician", the refining of her identity.

== Reception ==
Writing for Beats Per Minute, Chase McMullen contrasted the song to the open aggressiveness of "Spicy", saying it "practically glides, with CL displaying her equal strength for softer vocals. That doesn't mean she’s dropped even an ounce of that famous attitude." He additionally highlighted its catchiness, calling it "an instant, delightfully bitter, earworm." In its debut week, the song entered at number 35 on the Gaon Download Chart.

== Music video and promotion ==
The music video for "Lover Like Me" was uploaded to CL's YouTube channel son September 29. The music video features shots of CL in brightly colored sets, including a room covered in sunflowers, as well as a red-tinted studio full of vintage television sets.

== Awards ==
Awards for "Lover Like Me"
Year	Organization	Award	Result	Ref.
2021	Asian Pop Music Awards	Record of the Year (Overseas)	Won	
2021	Asian Pop Music Awards	Top 20 Songs of the Year (Overseas)	Won	

== Credits and personnel ==
Credits adapted from Melon.

- Lee Chae-rin – vocals, lyricist
- Freedo – lyricist, composer
- Anne-Marie Nicholson – lyricist
- Nafla – lyricist
- Cleo Tighe – lyricist
- Sarah Blanchard – lyricist
- Nick Lee – composer

== Release history ==
Release formats for "Lover Like Me"
Region	Date	Format	Label	Ref.
Various	September 29, 2021	Digital download, streaming	Very Cherry	
