= Doctor Pepper (song) =

Single by Diplo, CL, Riff Raff and OG Maco
- Released: May 26, 2015
- Recorded: 2015
- Genre: Trap
- Length: 3:46
- Label: Mad Decent
- Songwriters: Thomas Wesley Pentz; Lee Chae-rin; Horst Simco; Benedict Ihesiaba; Brian Wollman; Jordan Safford
- Producers: Diplo, Swizzymack

Diplo singles chronology
"Where Are Ü Now" (2015)	"Doctor Pepper" (2015)	"Be Right There" (2015)

CL singles chronology
"Dirty Vibe" (2014)	"Doctor Pepper" (2015)	"Hello Bitches" (2015)

Riff Raff singles chronology
"Tip Toe Wing In My Jawwdinz" (2014)	"Doctor Pepper" (2015)	"Spazz Out" (2015)

OG Maco singles chronology
"U Guessed It (Remix)" (2014)	"Doctor Pepper" (2015)	"No Love" (2016)

"Doctor Pepper" is a song by American music producer Diplo, South Korean rapper and singer CL and American rappers Riff Raff and OG Maco. It was released on May 26, 2015 by Mad Decent. Produced by Diplo and Swizzymack, "Doctor Pepper" is a trap song. CL later stated she wrote the lyrics after Diplo cancelled their recording session, making her write the song in a rush while drinking a can of Dr. Pepper. An accompanying music video was shot in Las Vegas.

== Track listings and formats ==
- Digital download
1. "Doctor Pepper" – 3:46

== Credits and personnel ==
Personnel

- Diplo – producer
- CL – vocals, songwriter
- Riff Raff – vocals, songwriter
- OG Maco – vocals, songwriter
- Swizzymack – Producer

== Release history ==
Country	Date	Format	Label
Worldwide	May 26, 2015	Digital download	Mad Decent
