= OG Maco =

American rapper (1992–2024)

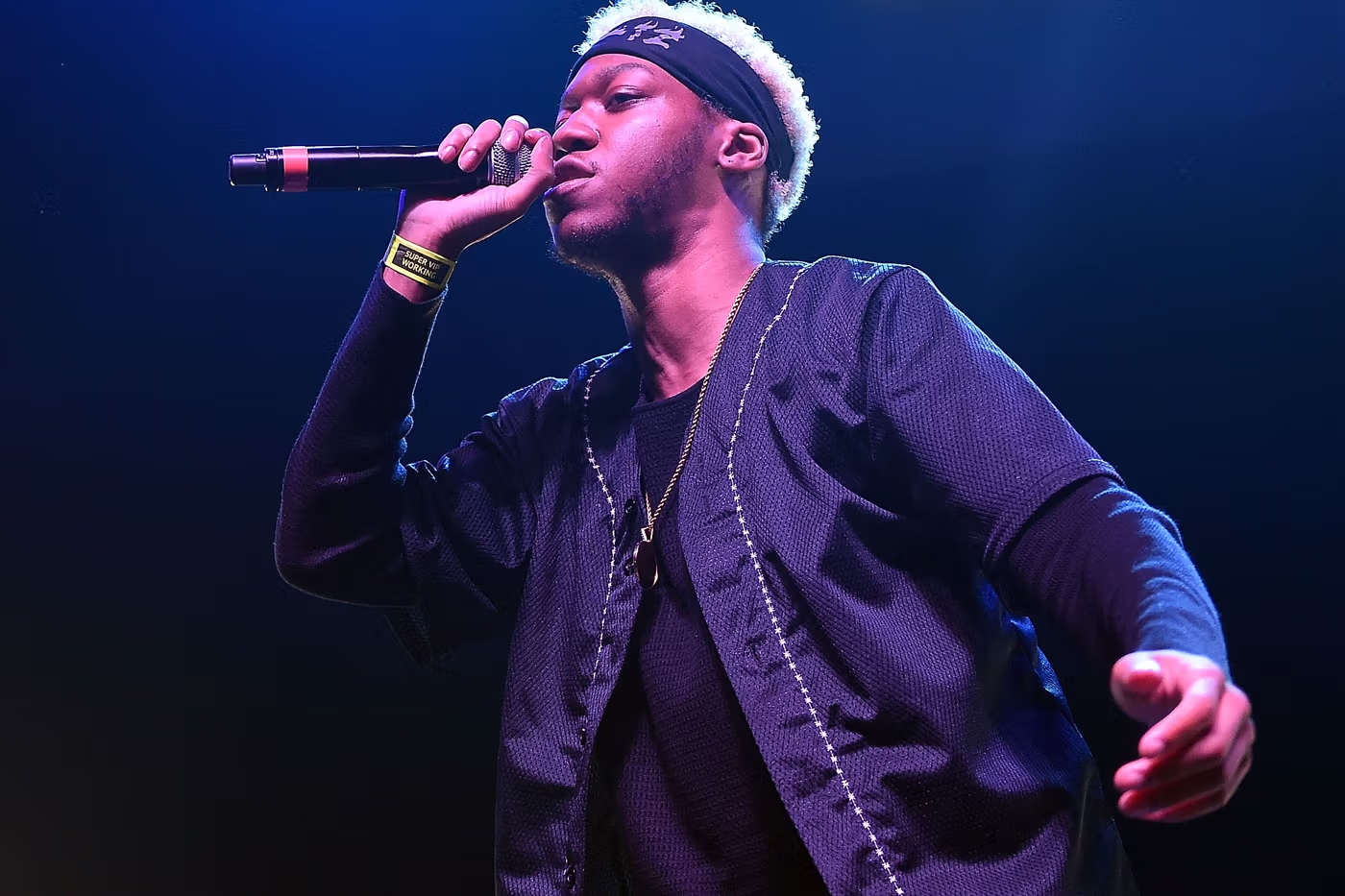
- OG Maco performing in 2014

Background information
- Also known as: Maco Mattox; Maco Curry
- Born: Benedict Chiajulam Ihesiba Jr. April 23, 1992; College Park, Georgia, U.S.
- Died: December 26, 2024 (aged 32) Los Angeles, California, U.S.
- Genres: Southern hip-hop; trap
- Occupations: Rapper; songwriter
- Years active: 2011–2024

Benedict Chiajulam Ihesiba Jr. (April 23, 1992 – December 26, 2024), known professionally as OG Maco, was an American rapper. He was best known for his debut single "U Guessed It", which spawned a remix that features 2 Chainz, that entered the Billboard Hot 100.

== Life and career ==
Benedict Chiajulam Ihesiba Jr. was born on April 23, 1992, in College Park, Georgia. He grew up with friends in a band named Dr. Doctor, in which he was a guitarist and singer.

Maco cited Black Sabbath, Kid Cudi, and Currensy as major influences. Maco was best known for his 2014 debut single "U Guessed It", which spawned a remix featuring 2 Chainz that entered the Billboard Hot 100. He signed to Quality Control Music that same year, which became an imprint of Motown and Capitol Records the following year. He was chosen as part of XXL magazine's 2015 annual Freshman Class. He was also the founder of the hip hop collective OGG, through which he discovered then-unknown producer OG Parker. Maco released seventeen extended plays between 2012 and 2016, and his full-length debut, The God of Rage, was released in October 2021.

=== Health issues and death ===
Ihesiba was seriously injured in a traffic collision on July 28, 2016. He suffered multiple skull fractures, cracked vertebrae, a broken orbital, and heart palpitations, and nearly lost his right eye.

In 2019, he was diagnosed with the flesh-eating disease necrotizing fasciitis, causing an improperly treated minor skin rash to leave much of his facial skin disfigured. Ihesiba struggled with depression from his battle with the condition, and on December 12, 2024, he was hospitalized after a self-inflicted gunshot wound to the head. He spent the next two weeks in a coma before dying from his injuries on December 26, 2024, at the age of 32.

== Discography ==
=== Studio albums ===
Title	Details
The God of Rage	Released: October 29, 2021; Label: Desperado Records; Format: Streaming
OG MACO	Released: August 11, 2023; Label: Jake P. Noch Family Office, LLC.; Format: Streaming

=== Extended plays ===
List of extended plays, with albums details
Title	Details
Public Speaking (as Maco Mattox)	Released: June 7, 2012; Label: Self-released; Format: Download
Live Life 2	Released: October 24, 2014; Label: Quality Control Music, OGG; Format: Download
OG Maco	Released: November 28, 2014; Label: Quality Control Music, OGG; Format: Download
Breathe	Released: December 17, 2014; Label: Quality Control Music, OGG; Format: Download
Yep (with Rome Fortune)	Released: January 6, 2015; Label: Quality Control Music, OGG; Format: Download
I Made This Shit Before "U Guessed It"	Released: March 27, 2015; Label: Quality Control Music, OGG; Format: Download
OGZAY (with Zaytoven)	Released: April 23, 2015; Label: Quality Control Music, OGG; Format: Download
Tax Free (with Pablo Dylan as TAX FREE)	Released: May 8, 2015; Label: Quality Control Music, OGG; Format: Download
OGG EVERLASTING (with OGG)	Released: June 1, 2015; Label: OGG; Format: Download
10 Moons 2 (as Maco Mattox)	Released: September 7, 2015; Label: Quality Control Music, OGG; Format: Download
7FRVR	Released: April 27, 2016; Label: Quality Control Music, OGG; Format: Download
OG Maco 2: Episode 1 – The Duke of Summer	Released: June 15, 2016; Label: Quality Control Music, OGG; Format: Download
OG Maco 2: Episode 2 – Remember	Released: June 18, 2016; Label: Quality Control Music, OGG; Format: Download
Breathe 2: Episode 1 – Unite	Released: July 8, 2016; Label: Quality Control Music, OGG; Format: Download
Blvk Phil Collins	Released: September 20, 2016; Label: Quality Control Music, OGG; Format: Download
For Scott...	Released: November 6, 2016; Label: Quality Control Music, OGG; Format: Download
Dynasty (with Jay 5)	Released: November 18, 2016; Label: Quality Control Music, OGG; Format: Download

=== Mixtapes ===
List of mixtapes, with albums details
Title	Details
Marty McFly: The Mixtape (as Maco Mattox)	Released: November 10, 2011; Label: Self-released; Format: Download
10 Moons (as Maco Mattox)	Released: February 21, 2012; Label: Self-released; Format: Download
Live Life	Released: February 14, 2014; Label: OGG; Format: Download
Give Em Hell (with Key!)	Released: August 7, 2014; Label: OGG; Format: Download
Gifts	Released: September 4, 2014; Label: OGG; Format: Download
15	Released: February 15, 2015; Label: Quality Control Music, OGG; Format: Download
The Lord of Rage	Released: January 1, 2016; Label: Quality Control Music, OGG; Format: Download
Children of the Rage	Released: March 4, 2017; Label: OGG; Format: Download
OG Maco 3	Released: June 12, 2017; Label: OGG; Format: Download

=== Singles ===
==== As lead artist ====
List of singles, with showing year released, peak chart positions and album name
Title	Year	Peak chart positions			Album
Title	Year	US	US R&B /HH	US Rap	Album
"U Guessed It"	2014	—	—	—	Give Em Hell
"U Guessed It (Remix)" (featuring 2 Chainz)	2014	90	27	21	OG Maco
"Fuckemx3" (featuring Migos)	2014	—	—	—	OG Maco
"Mirror Mirror" (featuring Kushy Stash)	2015	—	—	—	15
"Doctor Pepper" (with Diplo, CL and Riff Raff)	2015	—	—	—	Non-album single
"No Love"	2016	—	—	—	#BLVKPHILCOLLINS
"Prayer Line" (featuring Theo Ferragamo)	2016	—	—	—	#BLVKPHILCOLLINS
