= CL (rapper) =

South Korean rapper and singer (born 1991)

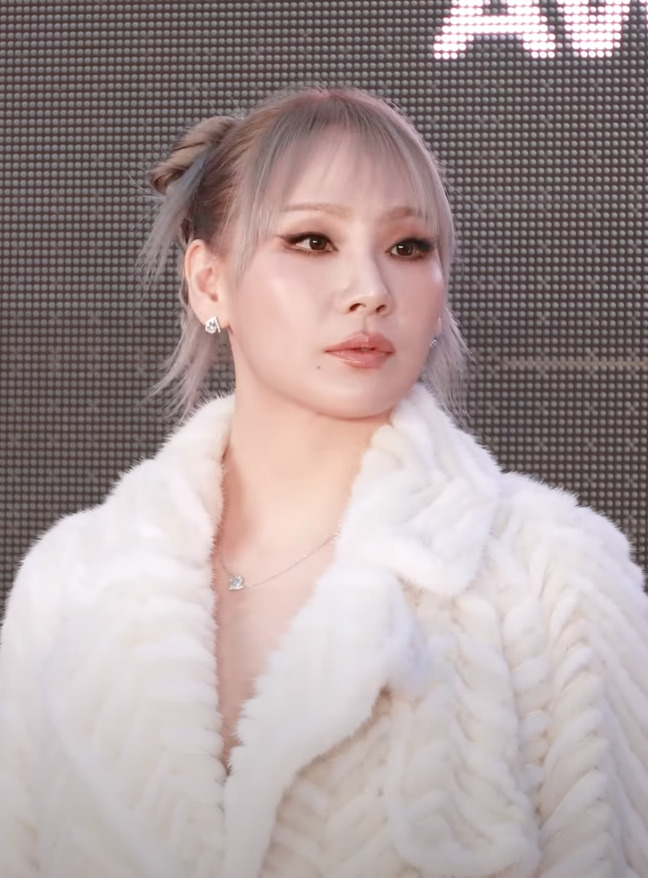
- CL at the Elle Style Awards in 2024
- Born: Lee Chae-rin; February 26, 1991 (age 35); Seoul, South Korea
- Occupations: Rapper; singer; songwriter
- Years active: 2007–present
- Musical career
- Genres: K-pop; hip hop; trap
- Labels: YG; School Boy; SuneV; Very Cherry; Konnect; The Black Label
- Member of: 2NE1

Korean name
- Hangul: 이채린
- RR: I Chaerin
- MR: I Ch'aerin

Signature
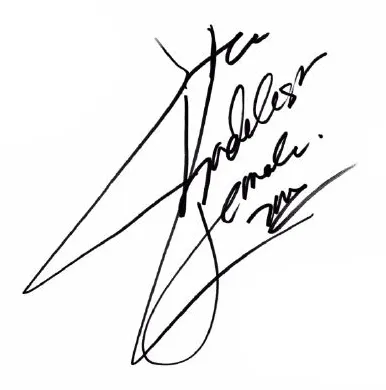

Lee Chae-rin (born February 26, 1991), better known by her stage name CL, is a South Korean rapper, singer, and songwriter. Born in Seoul, South Korea, she spent much of her early life in Japan and France. She rose to fame as a member and leader of the girl group 2NE1, which debuted in 2009 under YG Entertainment. 2NE1 became one of the most popular South Korean girl groups worldwide and one of the best-selling girl groups. CL made her solo debut with the single "The Baddest Female" in May 2013, followed by her second solo track "MTBD" in February 2014.

In 2015, amid 2NE1's hiatus, CL pursued a solo career with the release of the single "Hello Bitches" (2015). Her English-language single "Lifted", released in 2016, made her the first female Korean solo artist to place on the Billboard Hot 100, and the third Korean artist overall to do so. In November 2016, YG announced 2NE1's disbandment while confirming CL would remain signed to the label. She left YG in December 2019 and then released an EP In the Name of Love (2019), consisting of six tracks. Her debut studio album, Alpha, was released in October 2021. In 2026, CL signed with The Black Label and released the single "Iconic".

CL ranked 2nd and 25th on the readers polls for Time's 100 Most Influential People in the World in 2015 and 2016, respectively. She appeared on the 2019 Forbes 30 Under 30 Asia list; she was named one of the best girl group members of all time by The Guardian. She is recognized as a style icon by numerous publications worldwide.

== Life and career ==
=== 1991–2008: Early life and career beginnings ===
Lee Chae-rin was born in Seoul, South Korea, on February 26, 1991, but spent most of her childhood living in Paris, Tsukuba, and Tokyo. When she was 13, she moved to Paris alone where she studied for two years. She recalled that, "Culturally, I'm not 100 percent Korean. I'm very mixed, and very open." When she was 15, CL auditioned to join South Korean record label YG Entertainment. Her first feature on a song was Big Bang's "Intro (Hot Issue)" in 2007. Later that year, Lee performed for the first time on stage at Seoul Broadcasting System's Gayo Daejeon alongside her label mates. Her first credited appearance in a song was in 2008, with Uhm Jung-hwa's "DJ," in which she rapped.

=== 2009–2013: Debut with 2NE1 and solo career beginnings ===
Lee took on the stage name 'CL' and was appointed the leader and main rapper of 2NE1, alongside Bom, Sandara Park and Minzy. The group then collaborated with label-mates BigBang for the song "Lollipop" on March 27, 2009, before appearing on SBS's The Music Trend for the first time on May 17, where they performed their debut single "Fire". 2NE1 achieved significant success with their number-one single "I Don't Care" from their first extended play, 2NE1, which won them the "Song of the Year" accolade at the 2009 Mnet Asian Music Awards, making them the first rookie group to win a prize the same year they debuted.

In August 2009, she collaborated with label-mates G-Dragon and Teddy Park of 1TYM for the single "The Leaders", featured on G-Dragon's first solo album, Heartbreaker. The same month, after the group finished "I Don't Care" promotions, CL collaborated with fellow member Minzy for "Please Don't Go," which charted at number six on the Gaon Chart by the end of November. Her first solo single, "The Baddest Female", was released on May 28, 2013. For 2NE1's second album Crush, CL wrote the lyrics and co-composed the music for the tracks "Crush", "If I Were You", and "Baby I Miss You". She also wrote the lyrics for her solo track "MTBD", as well as the track "Scream".

=== 2014–2018: Stand-alone singles and featured appearances ===
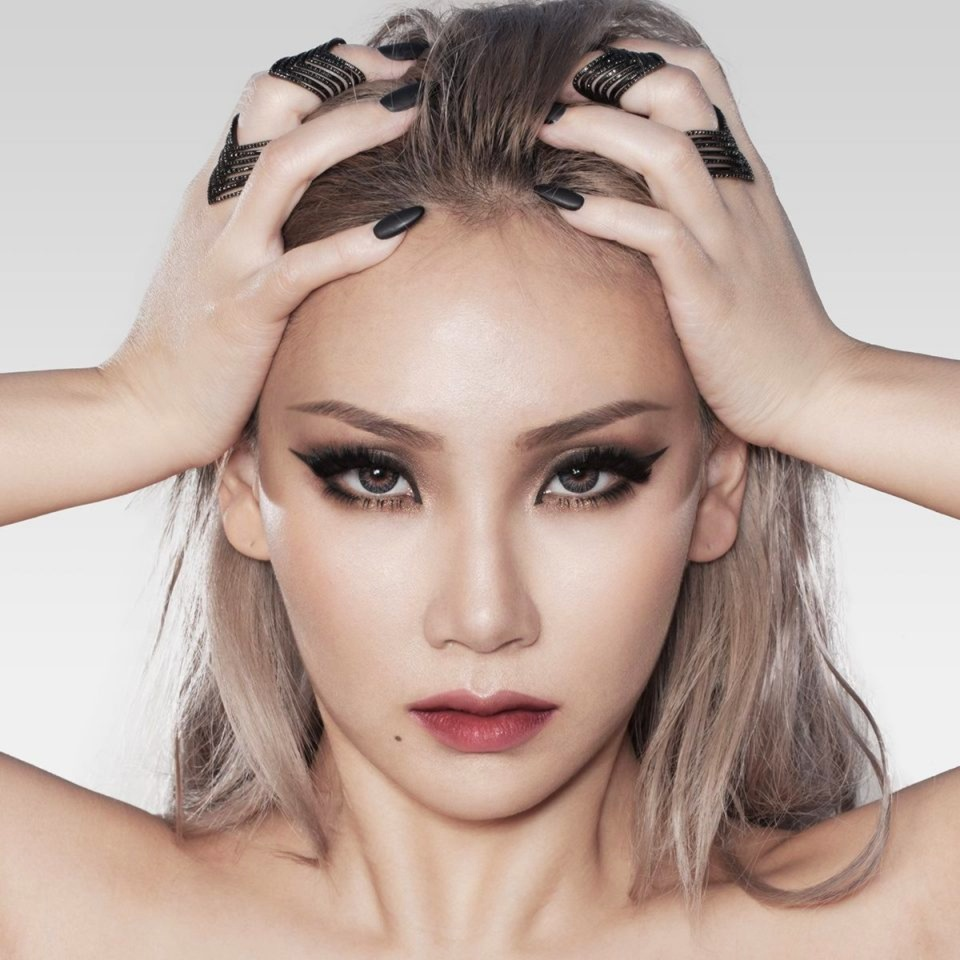
Promotional shoot for "Hello Bitches" in 2015

In October 2014, it was announced that CL was planning to debut as a solo artist the following year in the United States, teaming up with Scooter Braun as her manager. In May 2015, she featured on Diplo's single "Doctor Pepper", alongside Riff Raff and OG Maco. In November 2015, CL released her first single "Hello Bitches", as a teaser for her planned EP Lifted. She was also featured on labelmate Psy's single "Daddy". The song debuted at number 97 on the Billboard Hot 100, earning her first entry on the chart.

The single, "Lifted" was released on August 19, 2016. The song appeared in the Top 30 of iTunes' Hip-Hop/Rap chart within three hours of being released, peaking at number 21. It incorporates samples of Wu-Tang Clan's 1993 track "Method Man", and had the rapper himself appear in the accompanying music video. Time magazine referred to her as one of the biggest stars in Asia, and called her the "Future of K-pop in America". "Lifted" went on to peak at number 94 on the Billboard Hot 100, earning her her first entry as a solo artist and her second overall, and making her the first female South Korean solo artist to appear on the chart. On October 29, 2016, CL kicked off her first North American tour, the Hello Bitches Tour, at New York City's Hammerstein Ballroom. With the sold-out performance, she became the first K-pop female artist to hold a solo concert in the city. The tour visited other cities in the United States and Canada before concluding in Toronto on November 14.

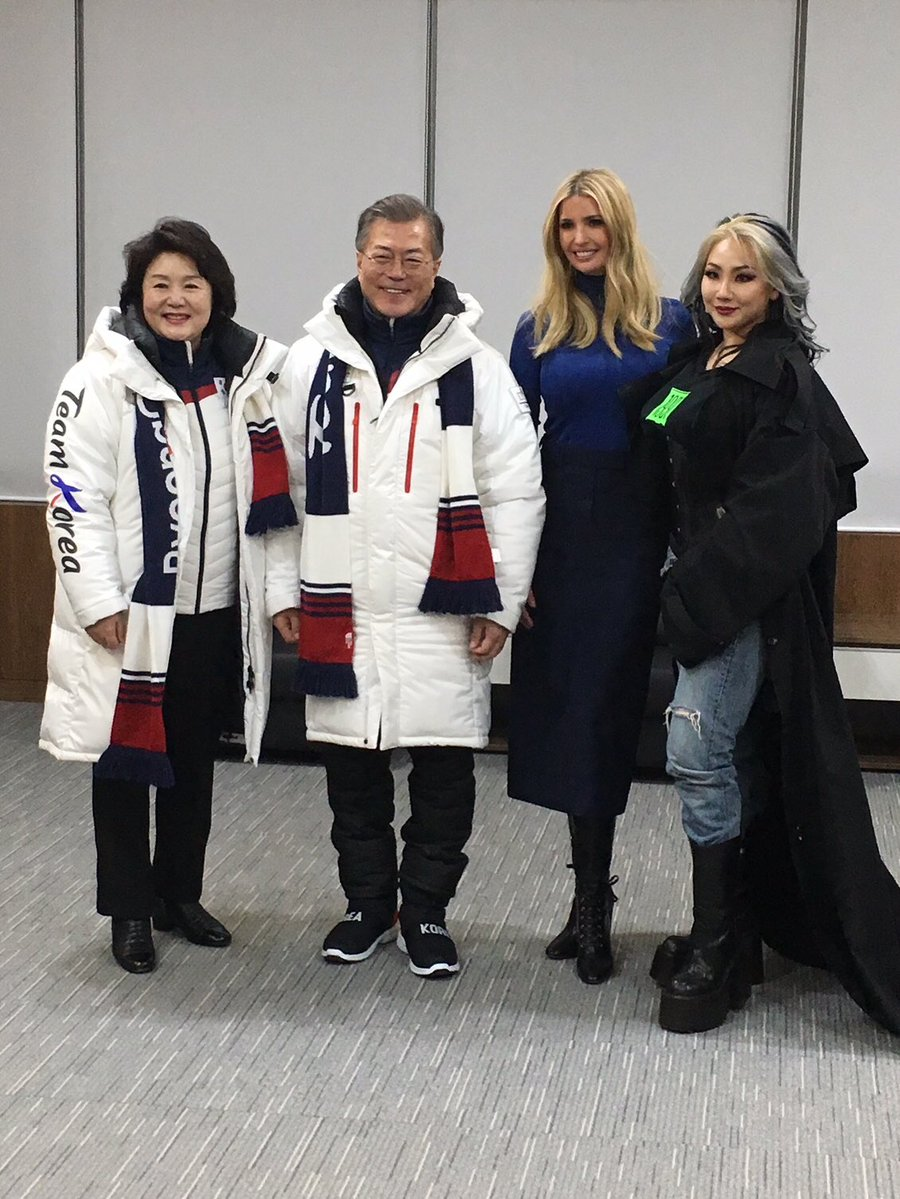
CL (far right) with Kim Jung-sook, Moon Jae-in, and Ivanka Trump at the 2018 Winter Olympics closing ceremony in Pyeongchang County.

Alongside Shaiana, she was featured on Lil Yachty's song "Surrender", an exclusive track off the Target deluxe edition of his album Teenage Emotions, released on May 26, 2017. CL also recorded a single for the original soundtrack of My Little Pony: The Movie soundtrack, entitled "No Better Feelin'", released on September 22, 2017. On January 4, 2018, it was reported she would make her Hollywood debut as an actress in Peter Berg's film Mile 22 which starred Mark Wahlberg. On February 25, 2018, CL performed at the 2018 Winter Olympics closing ceremony at Pyeongchang Olympic Stadium, performing parts of "The Baddest Female" and the 2NE1 global hit "I Am the Best". During the closing ceremony, she met with South Korean President Moon Jae-in, First Lady Kim Jung-sook, Exo, and Ivanka Trump, daughter of US President Donald Trump. In July of the same year, the Olympics channel included CL's performance in their list of Top 10 Olympic Live Music Performances of All Time, ranking her at number 8. In October, CL collaborated with the Black Eyed Peas on the track "Dopeness" along with an accompanying music video.

=== 2019–2025: Departure from YG Entertainment, In the Name of Love and Alpha ===
On November 8, 2019, YG Entertainment announced that CL did not renew her contract with the company and left the label. On December 4, shortly after leaving YG, she began releasing previously unreleased tracks for her digital solo EP project In the Name of Love for three consecutive weeks. On September 12, 2020, CL announced that she had been working on a new album that would be released later that year. Two days later, she released the music video for the song "Post Up", which would serve as the intro track for her upcoming album. On October 29, she released two singles—"Hwa" and "5 Star"—which were co-written by former labelmate Tablo. At the same time, CL announced that her first full-length album Alpha would be released on November 30. However, on November 16, she announced that she had decided to postpone the album release until early 2021, stating that while preparing the album she had developed new ideas.

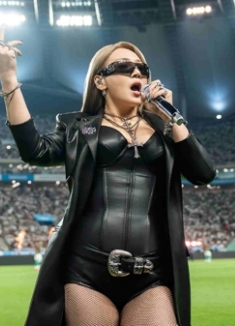
CL performing in August 2025

On February 26, 2021, CL released "Wish You Were Here", which coincided with her 30th birthday, released as a tribute to her mother who had died days prior on February 10 due to a heart attack. On June 16, CL appeared in the first episode of the second season of the TV series Dave, where she played the role of herself collaborating with rapper Lil Dicky as he aspires to take over the K-pop industry. On July 10, 2021, CL signed a domestic management contract with Konnect Entertainment in order to manage her activities in Korea. Two weeks later, domestic publications reported that CL would make her comeback in mid-August. It was later announced that CL would release her album Alpha on October 20, 2021. The digital single "Spicy" was first released on August 24.

On September 13, 2021, she became the first K-pop female artist to attend the Met Gala in New York City, alongside Blackpink's Rosé, wearing a custom made hanbok-inspired denim dress designed by Alexander Wang. Four days later, CL announced that Alpha's second digital single "Lover Like Me" would be released on September 29. On June 2, 2022, CL made her voice acting debut with the role of Sharki L for the animation Baby Shark's Big Show!. CL headlined the Tiger Remix festival in Ho Chi Minh City, Vietnam on New Years Eve 2023, which attracted an audience of 100,000 people.

=== 2026–present: The Black Label and new album ===
The Black Label, an associate company of YG Entertainment founded by Teddy Park, revealed on October 29, 2026, that they were in discussions regarding signing an exclusive contract with CL. It was confirmed two weeks later that she signed with the label and will release a new song that same month. She performed her new single "Iconic" at the 2026 MAMA Awards. She will also perform at the 2026 SBS Gayo Daejeon and KBS Song Festival.

== Artistry ==
=== Musical style ===
CL's discography utilizes various genres including hip hop, dance, and electronic styles, as well as integrating a variety of other genres. Her debut solo single "The Baddest Female" in 2013 was characterized as "a clattering ego massage that channelled Atlanta hip-hop", combining techno and dance elements with the catchphrase "Now do the unnie". The track jumps from a hip-hop beat to an electronica-infused build-up to the dubstep breakdown during the bridge. Her next solo track, "MTBD", was included as part of 2NE1's second studio album Crush (2014) and fused the genres of EDM, hip-pop and bubblegum trap over a tense drum beat, low bass, and a unique synth sound. Billboard stated that: "The beat was trendy yet fresh, employing of-the-moment, trap-inspired breakdowns" and highlighted her "fierce and playful rap and singing style". Fuse TV compared it to the musical styles of DJ Snake's "Turn Down for What", and deemed "MTBD" an upgraded version of the track.

CL continued to pursue hip-hop and electronic styles with the release of "Hello Bitches" in 2015, which featured instrumentations of synthesizers, a heavy 808 bassline, and a strong trap hip-hop beat as the main axis. Her 2016 English-language single "Lifted" marked her entry into reggae fusion, and was characterized as a relatively minimal breezy tropical hip-hop track. Following a period of inactivity, CL released the project EP In the Name of Love in December 2019. Featuring six tracks, Billboard noted that the EP "[shares] a bit of herself, and her past, through its reflective tunes." Stylistically, the record explores a variety of music genres from R&B to rap and tropical dance. In October 2020, CL released the track "Hwa", which references the national flower of South Korea. Rolling Stone commented that "CL's rapping prowess is on full display", as she rides a "booming bass line and snappy snares". The song reflects her individuality, referencing themes of fire, wealth, flower and change. In the track "5 Star", it contrasts the styles of "Hwa" with its love-filled lyrics and channels a more pop vibe.

=== Influences ===
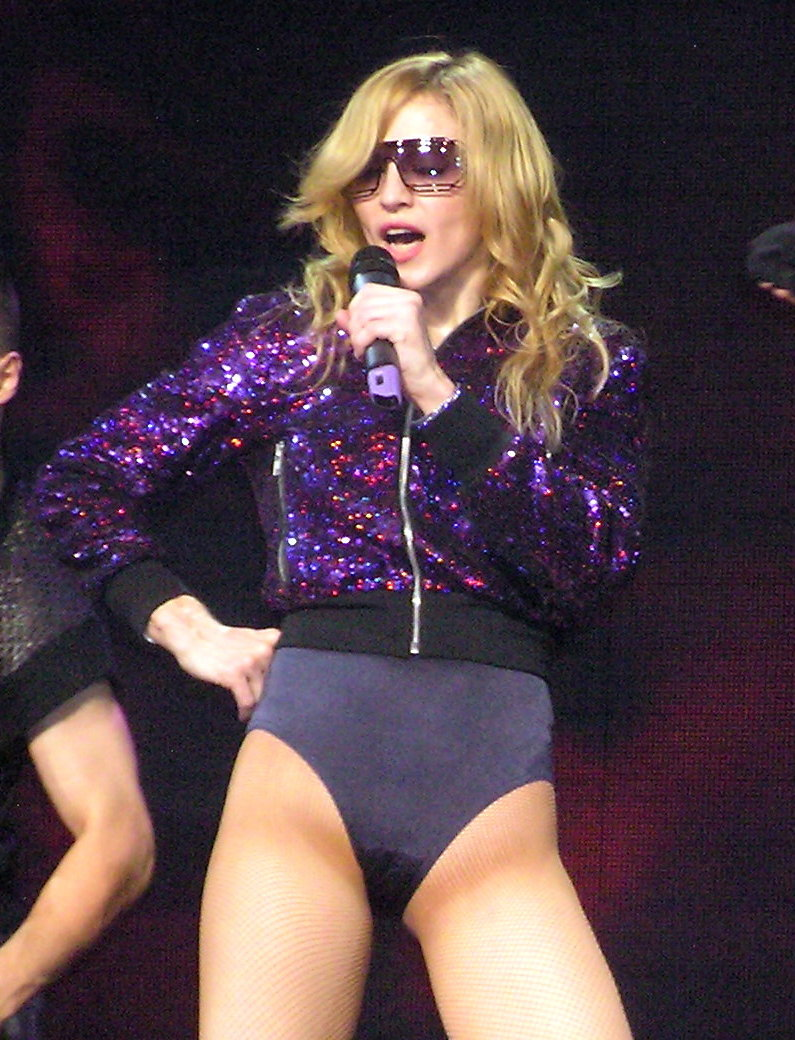
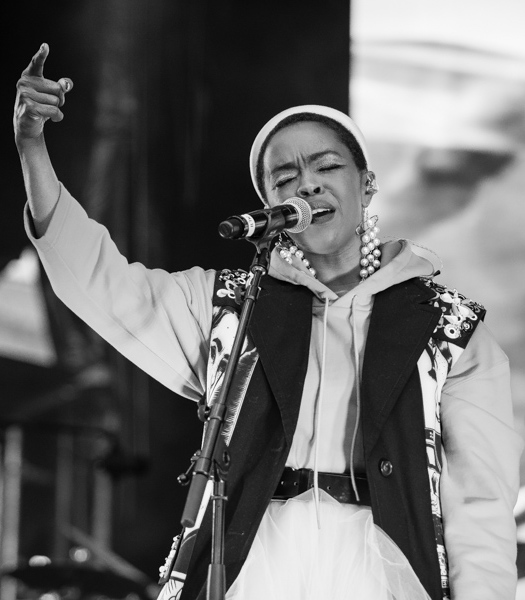
CL credits artists such as Madonna and Lauryn Hill (left to right) as major inspirations.

CL has cited 1TYM leader Teddy Park, who produced much of 2NE1's music throughout their career, as a source of influence and inspiration. In addition, she has attributed Madonna, Queen, and Lauryn Hill as role models for their unique styles and influence as well as their levels of originality.

CL recalled that The Miseducation of Lauryn Hill (1998) was the first album that she received from her father, while Beyoncé's Dangerously in Love (2003) was the first album that she had bought for herself. She has expressed admiration for Janet Jackson for teaching her the "power of movement of dance and expression", credited Missy Elliott for inspiring her with video visuals, and acknowledged Lil' Kim and Aaliyah for influencing her sense of fashion.

== Public image ==
An anomaly in the mainstream K-pop scene, as The Guardian describes, CL has been called "a bold and brash personality in a world of high-gloss uniformity". Noted for deviating from stereotypical trends throughout her career, Jeff Benjamin of Billboard magazine stated that "She has a more fearless mindset when it comes to her career that's not seen in most K-pop stars." Regarding her live performances, Tamar Herman of the same publication stating that she "dominate[s] stage after stage with her charismatic presence". Owen Meyers highlighted her charismatic character and stated that "she helped pave the way for K-pop's explosion." In an interview with CNN at New York Fashion Week 2016, fashion designer Jeremy Scott added: "I go around the world, I've seen her fans in Chile, in Brazil, obviously all through Europe. [...] She's not just a Korean or an Asian phenomenon, she really is a global superstar".

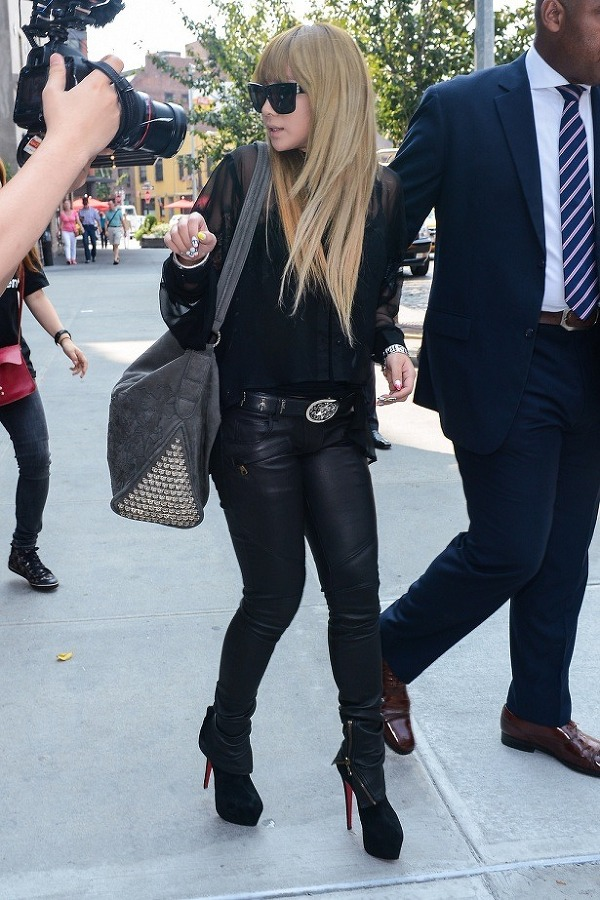
CL in New York City in 2012

Hailed as an "ultimate style queen" in South Korea by Dazed, CL's influence extends beyond music into the fashion industry. Regarded as a style icon and a fashion industry figure, she has been known to experiment with a variety of fashion trends and styles throughout her career. She holds connections with several internationally renowned designers, including Jeremy Scott, Marc Jacobs, and Karl Lagerfeld and is often seen wearing and attending events for fashion houses such as Chanel, Saint Laurent, Fendi, Moschino, Givenchy, Balmain, and Alexander McQueen. Vogue magazine called her "affinity for loud, larger-than-life clothes" a "catnip for photographers during Fashion Week." Often combining clothes from luxury fashion houses with streetwear, the magazine stated that "While most front row attendees show up in something from the corresponding brand," CL chooses "something that complements not just the aesthetic of the house, but also perfectly encapsulates her own 'baddest female' reputation." Her personal style has been described as resembling a tomboy-like aesthetic, commonly incorporating boots, biker jackets and sports caps with young menswear favorites such as Nasir Mazhar, Astrid Andersen and Sam MC.

CL has appeared on the cover for numerous fashion magazines in South Korea and abroad, including for Paper, W, Elle, Vogue, Rolling Stone, Marie Claire, Dazed, Cosmopolitan, and Allure; she was the first female South Korean artist to cover an American magazine and the first singer to cover Elle Korea. Daisy Jones of Dazed stated that "her fashion status extends far beyond an avalanche of labels and designer name-checks – like Rihanna, she's an effortless risk-taker, with her eyes firmly facing the future." In an interview with i-D in 2015, CL elaborated on how fashion has influenced her career, saying: "Fashion and music are connected since both are expressions. I love to perform and express myself to inspire people. That's why fashion is a huge inspiration to me." Nordstrom's Trunk Club included her in their list of 15 Most Stylish Female Icons worldwide who have changed fashion in recent history, and deemed her one of the biggest female style icons in K-pop.

== Impact and influence ==
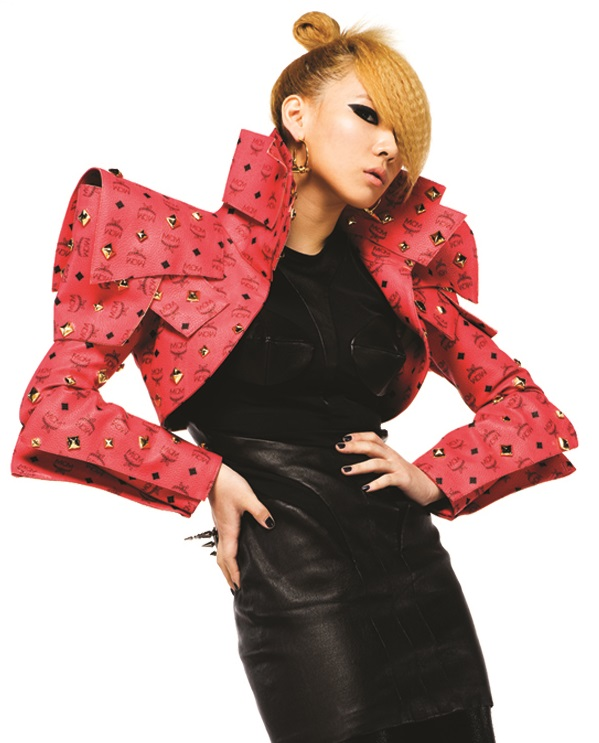
CL in 2010

"[CL] expanded the image of the female K-pop idol. Her brand of unapologetic cool was refreshing and contributed in paving a way for other K-pop artists to follow".

— Hae Joo Kim, K-pop expert and the assistant chair of professional music at Berklee College of Music

In September 2011, CL was voted the best performer among South Korean girl group members in a survey consisting of 27 music experts and choreographers. In a Sports Dong-a survey published in March 2013, CL was ranked the number one best female idol in South Korea based on votes from 70 fellow K-pop idols. Appearing on Time magazine's readers polls for Most Influential People in the World for two consecutive years, CL ranked 2nd place in 2015 (behind only Vladimir Putin) and 25th in 2016. She became the first female K-pop idol to appear on Hypebeast's list of 100 influential people in fashion as well as the BoF 500 fashion industry power list, who called CL a "South Korean force of nature" and the K-pop scene's "queen of hip-hop" who has been a "muse to a number of designers".

In April 2019, CL was listed by Forbes magazine as one of Asia's 30 Under 30 most influential celebrities in the field of entertainment & sports. In recognition of her stage presence and duality, The Guardian ranked her as the 19th best girl group member of all time in October 2019, and was only one of the two Korean artists to have been mentioned. She has been called "K-pop Queen" by international publications such as France 24, Rolling Stone and Billboard, as well as "Asia's first lady of pop" by Dazed. In March 2021, she was the only Korean musician selected as part of Google's Women's History Month campaign, attributing to her unique color and "role in heralding the beginning of the golden age of K-pop". CL was chosen as GQ Korea's Woman of the Year in 2022.

Numerous artists have cited her as an influence or inspiration, including AllDay Project's Annie Moon, Blackpink's Lisa, Loona's Hyunjin, (G)I-dle's Soyeon, Chungha, Aespa's Giselle, Ive's Gaeul, GFriend's SinB, Secret Number's Jinny, Hot Issue's Hyeongshin, Lorde, Billlie's Moon Sua, WJSN's Exy, and Oh My Girl's Jiho. Yuji and Haeun of 3YE and Choi Yoo-jung have said that they have studied CL's performances and expressions while practicing performing. At the 2018 Winter Olympics, Korean-American snowboarding gold medalist Chloe Kim stated that "I listen to CL before I compete."

== Other ventures ==
=== Endorsements ===
As the leader of 2NE1, CL has appeared in a number of commercials and advertisements for various prominent brands, including Nikon, Intel, Samsung, and LG. Aside from her group endorsements, CL took part as a celebrity model for luxury cosmetic company Lancôme's "Vision of Beauties" campaign in 2011. The following year, she appeared alongside actor Lee Dong-wook in advertisements for Cass Light Beer, a company who has attracted attention with its TV commercials, and featured the pair in a "Cyber Dance Battle" in a space and Arctic themed environment. In 2014, CL landed endorsement deals with Glacéau's Vitamin Water, KGB Lemon Vodka, and appeared alongside bandmate Minzy and Winner in Adidas's #allinfordance advertising campaign. In February of that year, CL was named the face of Maybelline New York and subsequently appeared in multiple commercials for their cosmetic products. Her endorsement of the Magnum Volume Express mascara soon saw a significant increase in sales, tripling the amount as compared to the previous year, and became known as the "CL mascara".

In 2017, she joined the likes of Karlie Kloss, Candace Parker, and Hannah Bronfman in Adidas's "Here to Create" movement; an official from the company cited her representation of creativeness and inspiration as the reason for her selection. In April, CL was unveiled as an endorsement model for high-end luggage manufacturer Tumi as part of their Global Citizen Campaign, where they selected several influential figures from various fields as Global Citizens. For the campaign, she travelled to Chefchaouen in Morocco as an endorsement for the brand's 19 Degree collection.

Upon appearing as an advertisement model for Taco Bell in February 2021, CL became the first female solo artist from South Korea to feature in a television commercial in the United States. In May, CL became the face of Nike Korea's "Play New" campaign while Johnnie Walker introduced her as the global ambassador for the brand's "Keep Walking" campaign, as part of its launch into Korea and other markets in Asia the following month. In 2022, Coca-Cola Korea selected her as an endorsement model for Dr Pepper.

=== Fashion ===
In 2013, head of Moschino Jeremy Scott selected CL as one of his muses, owing to her being "one of the fiercest girls to come out of Seoul". Because of her influence throughout Asia, CL collaborated with the luxury fashion brands Kenzo and On Pedder in 2014. While on tour with 2NE1, CL appeared at a promotional and fan-signing event for the collaboration at On Pedder's flagship store in Hong Kong. In July of the same year, CL was named the muse of upscale brand Hazzys for their 2014 F/W and 2015 S/S seasons, who cited her charisma, trendy style and appeal among the 20s and 30s age demographics a great fit for the brand's modern image. In 2016, CL became a muse for Alexander Wang; Monica Kim of Vogue deemed her a prime example of "unapologetic approach to life" and a "fearless take on hair and makeup that celebrates individuality".

In January 2020, CL became the first Korean brand ambassador for Ivy Park, an athleisure fashion line owned by Beyoncé, and appeared alongside the singer in promotional shoots for the brand's Ivy Park x Adidas collection. In June 2021, CL collaborated with French haute couture designer Jean Paul Gaultier in a pictorial for W Korea's July issue, where he directly airlifted his collection to Korea for CL. The outfit that she wore for her 2022 We The Fest performance, which was designed by Harry Halim, was later showcased in the contemporary fashion exhibition at the Asian Civilisations Museum in Singapore. In 2024, she became the first K-pop artist to join the expert committee for the LVMH Grand Prize, joining the likes of Naomi Campbell, Suzy Menkes, Imran Amed, and Hans Ulrich Obrist.

=== Agency ===
CL was reported to have run her one-person label Very Cherry for about five years without popular-culture planning-business registration. Coverage treated that as a suspected breach of the Popular Culture and Arts Industry Development Act. In March 2026, the Seoul Western District Prosecutors' Office issued a suspended indictment, a disposition that accepts the allegation but does not send the case to trial. Reports said prosecutors weighed that the law had not been fully understood and that the firm was registered after the breach came to light.

== Filmography ==
=== Television shows ===
Year	Title	Role	Notes	Ref.
2021	Dave	Herself	Cameo; Season 2, Episode 1	
2021	Super Band 2	Producer		
2021	Street Woman Fighter	Herself	CocaNButter X CL (Caviar), Collaboration Stage; Season 1, Episode 9	

== Discography ==
- Alpha (2021)

== Tours ==
- Hello Bitches Tour (2016)

== Accolades ==
=== Awards and nominations ===
Name of award ceremony, year presented, award category, nominee of award, and result of nomination
Award ceremony	Year	Category	Nominee(s) / Work(s)	Result	Ref.
Asia Artist Awards	2021	Female Solo Singer Popularity Award	CL	Won	
Asia Artist Awards	2023	Popularity Award – Singer (Female)	CL	Nominated	
Asian Pop Music Awards	2020	Most Outstanding Song of the Year	"Hwa"	Won	
Asian Pop Music Awards	2020	Best Producer (Overseas)	"Hwa"	Nominated	
Asian Pop Music Awards	2021	Top 20 Albums of the Year (Overseas)	Alpha	Won	
Asian Pop Music Awards	2021	Top 20 Songs of the Year (Overseas)	"Lover Like Me"	Won	
Asian Pop Music Awards	2021	Record of the Year (Overseas)	"Lover Like Me"	Won	
Asian Pop Music Awards	2021	Album of the Year (Overseas)	Alpha	Nominated	
Asian Pop Music Awards	2021	Best Female Artist (Overseas)	Alpha	Nominated	
Asian Pop Music Awards	2021	Best Lyricist (Overseas)	"Wish You Were Here"	Nominated	
Asian Pop Music Awards	2021	Best Music Video (Overseas)	"Tie a Cherry"	Nominated	
Asian Pop Music Awards	2021	Best Producer (Overseas)	Alpha	Nominated	
D Awards	2027	Best Solo – Female	CL	Pending	
Gaon Chart Music Awards	2015	Song of the Year (December)	"Daddy" (featuring CL)	Won	
Gaon Chart Music Awards	2021	Artist of the Year – Digital (January)	"Rosario" (with Epik High and Zico)	Nominated	
Elle Style Awards	2024	Elle Woman of the Year	CL	Won	
Fashionista Awards	2015	Best Fashionista – Makeup Category	CL	Won	
GQ Korea	2022	Woman of the Year	CL	Won	
InStyle Star Icon	2016	Best Fashionista	CL	Nominated	
International Dance Music Awards	2015	Best Dubstep/Drum & Bass Track	"Dirty Vibe"	Nominated	
Korea First Brand Awards (Note: The Korea First Brand Awards is hosted by the Korea Consumer Brand Committee and the Korea Consumer Forum. Awards are based on a nationwide survey held in South Korea.)	2022	Hip-Hop Artist	CL	Won	
Korean Hip-Hop Awards	2017	Best Collaboration	"₩ 1,000,000" (with Okasian, G-Dragon, BewhY)	Nominated	
Korean Music Awards	2022	Best K-pop Album	Alpha	Nominated	
MAMA Awards	2013	Best Dance Performance – Female Solo	"The Baddest Female"	Won	
MAMA Awards	2013	Song of the Year	"The Baddest Female"	Nominated	
MAMA Awards	2018	Best Temptation	CL	Won	
MAMA Awards	2021	Worldwide Fans' Choice Top 10	CL	Nominated	
Mnet 20's Choice Awards	2013	20's Style Award	CL	Won	
MTV Iggy	2015	International Song of the Summer	"Doctor Pepper"	Nominated	
People's Choice Awards	2019	The Most Inspiring Asian Woman	CL	Won	
Philippine K-pop Awards	2013	Hottest Female Star	CL	Won	
Philippine K-pop Awards	2014	Hottest Female Star	CL	Won	
PopCrush Awards	2016	Best Music Video	"Lifted"	Nominated	
PopCrush Awards	2016	Best Style	CL	Won	
PopCrush Awards	2017	Queen of Social Media	CL	Won	
SBS MTV Best of the Best	2013	Best Female Solo	"The Baddest Female"	Nominated	
Seoul Music Awards	2013	Bonsang Award	"The Baddest Female"	Nominated	
Seoul Music Awards	2013	Popularity Award	"The Baddest Female"	Nominated	
Seoul Music Awards	2019	R&B/Hip-Hop Award	CL	Nominated	
Seoul Music Awards	2022	U+Idol Live Best Artist Award	CL	Nominated	
Style Icon Awards	2014	Top 10 Style Icons	CL	Nominated	
Style Icon Awards	2016	Top 10 Style Icons	CL	Nominated	
V Chart Awards	2014	Top Female Artist – Korean	CL	Won	

=== Listicles ===
Name of publisher, year listed, name of listicle, and placement
Publisher	Year	Listicle	Placement	Ref.
Business of Fashion	2016	BoF 500 (Note: The BoF 500 is an annual fashion industry power list of global figures who have made an impact in the $2.4 trillion fashion industry.)	Included	
Complex	2026	The 25 Best Dressed K-Pop Stars of All Time, Ranked	10th	
Complex	2026	The Best Dressed Female K-Pop Stars of All Time, Ranked	4th	
Edaily	2011	Best Female Performers in Korea Expert Survey	1st	
Forbes	2019	30 Under 30 Asia	Included	
The Guardian	2019	Best girl band members of all time	19th	
High Cut Korea	2010	Top Fashion Girl Group Idol	1st	
Hypebeast	2016	Hypebeast 100 Influential People in Fashion	Included	
Nordstrom Trunk Club	2020	15 Style Icons That Changed Fashion	Included	
Olympic Games	2018	Top 10 Olympic Live Music Performances of All Time	8th	
Sports Dong-a	2013	Best Female Idol	1st	
Time	2015	Time 100 Readers Poll	2nd	
Time	2016	Time 100 Readers Poll	25th	
