= Dirty Vibe =

- Remixes EP cover.

Single by Skrillex, Diplo, CL and G-Dragon

from the album Recess
- Released: December 15, 2014
- Genre: EDM; dubstep
- Length: 3:26
- Label: Big Beat; Owsla; Atlantic; Asylum
- Songwriters: Sonny Moore; Thomas Wesley Pentz; Kwon Ji-Yong; Lee Chae-rin; Teddy Hong-Jun Park; Robin Cho
- Producers: Skrillex; Diplo

Skrillex singles chronology
"Take Ü There" (2014)	"Dirty Vibe" (2014)	"Where Are Ü Now" (2015)

Diplo singles chronology
"Take Ü There" (2014)	"Dirty Vibe"	"Where Are Ü Now" (2015)

CL singles chronology
"The Baddest Female" (2013)	"Dirty Vibe" (2014)	"Doctor Pepper" (2015)

G-Dragon singles chronology
"Good Boy" (2014)	"Dirty Vibe" (2014)	"Zutter" (2015)

Music video
- "Dirty Vibe" on YouTube

"Dirty Vibe" is a single by American producers Skrillex, Diplo, and South Korean rappers CL and G-Dragon. It was released on December 15, 2014, as the fourth single from Skrillex's debut studio album Recess (2014). The single charted at number 15 on Billboard's Hot Dance/Electronic Songs.

== Composition and lyrics ==
"Dirty Vibe" is a EDM song initially released on Skrillex's album Recess on March 18, 2014. The lyrics include CL rapping "you're in the presence of a queen" and "You ain’t know? I'm your girl’s lesbian crush", which perhaps references 2NE1's album Crush. G-Dragon raps "I don't pop molly, I rock microphones," and "I'm as dirty as they come and there's only one."

== Music video ==
An official music video was premiered on Red Bull's official page on December 15, 2014. It was released later on YouTube. The video was directed by Lil’ Internet.

== Track listing ==
Digital download – EP
No.	Title	Length
1.	"Dirty Vibe" (DJ Snake and Aazar Remix)	3:36
2.	"Dirty Vibe" (Habstrakt Remix)	5:12
3.	"Dirty Vibe" (Jack Beats Re-work)	4:01
4.	"Dirty Vibe" (Ricky Remedy Remix)	3:42
Total length:		16:31

== Personnel ==
- Sonny "Skrillex" Moore – production
- Thomas Wesley "Diplo" Pentz – production
- G-Dragon – writer, vocals, rapper
- CL – writer, vocals, rapper

== Chart performance ==
=== Weekly charts ===
Chart (2014)	Peak position
South Korea International (Gaon)	6
US Hot Dance/Electronic Songs (Billboard)	15
US Dance Digital Song Sales (Billboard)	21

=== Monthly charts ===
Chart (2014)	Peak position
South Korea International (Gaon)	17

== Release history ==
Country	Date	Format	Label
Worldwide	December 15, 2014	Digital download; streaming	Owsla; Big Beat; Atlantic
