= Lifted (CL song) =

Single by CL
- Released: August 19, 2016
- Genre: Hip hop; reggae fusion
- Length: 2:55
- Label: YG
- Songwriters: Teddy Park; Lee Chae-rin; Asher Roth; Robert Diggs; Clifford Smith
- Producer: Teddy Park

CL singles chronology
"Daddy" (2015)	"Lifted" (2016)	"Dopeness" (2018)

Music video
- "Lifted" on YouTube

"Lifted" is a song by South Korean rapper and singer CL. It was released through YG Entertainment on August 19, 2016, as her debut English single.

== Background ==
The song was written by CL, Asher Roth, and Teddy Park, with the production being handled by the latter. It heavily samples the song "Method Man" by Wu-Tang Clan.

== Critical reception ==
Colette Bennett of The Daily Dot said "something about [the song] seems too simple" and went on to say that "CL's rapping is strong as usual" and "the song has a chill, reggae-inspired vibe". Billboard's Tamar Herman stated that the song "diverges sharply from CL's image as one of South Korea's most prominent female rappers and eschews her typical aggressive style. Referencing drugs and liquor liberally while roaming around New York City, this isn't the same CL that K-pop fans are used to. Built for listening to on a hazy summer day, 'Lifted' takes a step back from CL's typical raps, aside from a quick bit at the beginning of the song." Nolan Feeney of Entertainment Weekly labeled it "a solid-gold banger".

== Commercial performance ==
The song debuted at number 94 on the Hot 100 making CL's first entry as a lead artist, second overall on the chart and also the third Korean act to do so overall. The song garnered 5.2 million streams in the United States by the week ending on October 6.

== Music video and promotion ==
A music video for the song, directed by Dave Meyers, was released on August 18, 2016. CL performed the song live for the first time on The Late Late Show with James Corden on September 15, 2016. The Video also Features a Cameo from Method Man. It was also performed throughout CL's Hello Bitches Tour in late 2016 in several North American cities. She also performed the song at the 2016 SBS Gayo Daejun, the first time the song was performed in Korea.

== Awards ==
Awards for "Lifted"
Year	Organization	Award	Result	Ref.
2016	PopCrush Fan Choice Awards	Best Music Video	Won	

== Charts ==
Chart (2016)	Peak position
US Billboard Hot 100	94
US Rap Digital Songs (Billboard)	31

== Release history ==
Region	Date	Format	Label	Ref.
Various	August 19, 2016	Digital download; streaming	YG Entertainment	
