= Riff Raff discography =

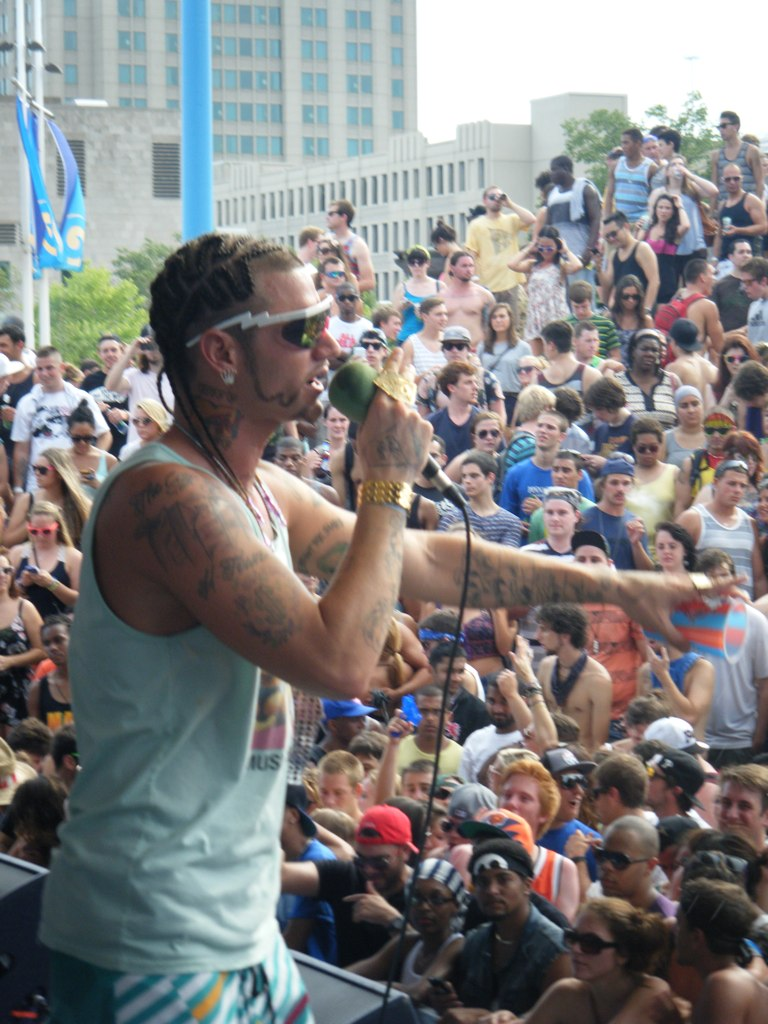
- Riff Raff performing in December 2011.
- Studio albums: 10
- EPs: 2
- Singles: 55
- Mixtapes: 21
- Collaborative albums: 4
- Remix albums: 4

The American hip hop rapper Riff Raff has released ten studio albums, four remix albums, two EP, four collaborative albums, twenty one mixtapes, and fifty-five singles (along with ten collaborative singles, and nineteen as a featured artist).

== Albums ==
=== Studio albums ===
List of albums, with selected chart positions
Title	Album details	Peak chart positions		
Title	Album details	US	US R&B/HH	US Rap
Neon Icon	Released: June 24, 2014; Label: Mad Decent; Format: CD, LP, digital download	22	6	4
Peach Panther	Released: June 24, 2016; Label: Neon Nation Corporation, BMG; Format: CD, LP, digital download	69	5	3
Alcoholic Alligator	Released: April 20, 2018; Label: Neon Nation, Empire, Beatrap Sound; Format: CD, LP, digital download	—	—	—
Pink Python	Released: April 12, 2019; Label: Neon Nation, Empire, Beatrap Sound; Format: CD, LP, digital download	—	—	—
Cranberry Vampire	Released: October 25, 2019; Label: Neon Nation, Empire, Beatrap Sound; Format: CD, LP, digital download	—	—	—
Vanilla Gorilla	Released: June 26, 2020; Label: Neon Nation, Empire, Beatrap Sound; Format: CD, LP, digital download	—	—	—
Welcome to Shaolin	Released: January 17, 2025; Label: Neon Nation, Empire, Beatrap Sound; Format: CD, LP, digital download	—	—	—
NEON NIGHTHAWK	Released: June 26, 2026; Label: Neon Nation, Empire, Beatrap Sound; Format: CD, LP, digital download	—	—	—
FUCHSIA FALCON	Released: September 11, 2026; Label: Neon Nation, Empire, Beatrap; Format: CD, LP, digital download	—	—	—
Neon iGUANA	Released: October 30, 2026; Label: Neon Nation, Empire, Beatrap; Format: CD, LP, digital download	—	—	—

=== Remix albums ===
List of remix albums
Title	Album details
Purple Icon (Chopped Not Slopped)	Released: March 10, 2015; Label: Mad Decent; Format: Digital download
Greatest Chops Vol.1 (Chopped Not Slopped)	Released: September 21, 2018; Label: Neon Nation, Empire, Beatrap Sound; Format: Digital download
Tangerine Tiger (Chopped Not Slopped)	Released: May 17, 2019; Label: Neon Nation, Empire, Beatrap Sound; Format: Digital download
Cherry Chupacabra (Chopped Not Slopped)	Released: December 13, 2024; Label: Neon Nation, Empire, Beatrap Sound; Format: Digital download

=== EPs ===
List of EPs
Title	Album details
Trench Coat Towers	Released: October 31, 2015; Label: Jody Highroller The Label; Format: Digital download
Teriyaki Tidal Wave (with MaudestMind)	Released: November 5, 2021; Label: Jody Highroller The Label; Format: Digital download

=== Collaborative albums ===
List of collaborative albums, with selected details
Title	Album details
Three Loco (with Andy Milonakis, Dirt Nasty)	Released: November 27, 2012; Label: Mad Decent; Format: N/A
The White West (with DJ Afterthought)	Released: August 4, 2017; Label: Neon Nation, Empire; Format: Digital download
Cool Blue Jewels (with DJ Afterthought)	Released: February 9, 2018; Label: Neon Nation, Empire; Format: Digital download
Turquoise Tornado (with Yelawolf)	Released: April 9, 2021; Label: Million Dollar Mullet Music, Slumerican; Format: Digital download

=== Mixtapes ===
List of mixtapes, with selected chart positions.
Title	Album details	Peak chart positions
Title	Album details	US R&B/HH
Puttin' Money on His Books 2k5	Released: 2005; Label: Self-released; Format: CD	—
Never Ending Saturday	Released: July 1, 2009; Label: Self-released; Format: Digital download	—
Rookie of the Future	Released: August 13, 2010; Label: Self-released; Format: Digital download	—
Trick or Treat	Released: August 13, 2010; Label: Self-released; Format: Digital download	—
Freestyle Scientist	Released: August 16, 2010; Label: Self-released; Format: Digital download	—
Texas Tornado	Released: August 16, 2010; Label: Self-released; Format: Digital download	—
Party McHardy	Released: September 7, 2010; Label: Self-released; Format: Digital download	—
Hilton Swag Vol. 1	Released: October 27, 2010; Label: Self-released; Format: Digital download	—
Purple Haze & Hand Grenades (with Lean Team)	Released: August 13, 2011; Label: Self-released; Format: Digital download	—
Sour & Gun Powder	Released: November 2, 2011; Label: Self-released; Format: Digital download	—
Summer of Surf	Released: June 29, 2012; Label: Self-released; Format: Digital download	—
Rap Game Bon Jovi	Released: July 3, 2012; Label: Self-released; Format: Digital download	—
The Golden Alien	Released: July 10, 2012; Label: Self-released; Format: CD, digital download	—
Birth of an Icon	Released: August 9, 2012; Label: Self-released; Format: Digital download	—
Hologram Panda (with Dame Grease)	Released: December 12, 2012; Label: Mad Decent; Format: Digital download	—
Jumpin' out the Gym (with DollaBillGates)	Released: April 29, 2013; Label: Self-released; Format: Digital download	—
Hardwood Classics (with Ghetty)	Released: May 27, 2014; Label: Self-released; Format: Digital download	—
Hardwood Classics, Vol. 2 (with Ghetty)	Released: July 31, 2015; Label: Self-released; Format: Digital download	—
Balloween (with DJ Afterthought)	Released: October 25, 2016; Label: Neon Nation, Empire; Format: Digital download	39
Aquaberry Aquarius	Released: January 30, 2017; Label: Neon Nation, Empire; Format: Digital download	—
Tangerine Tiger	Released: November 9, 2018; Label: Neon Nation, Empire, Beatrap Sound; Format: Digital download	—

== Singles ==
=== As lead artist ===
List of singles, with selected chart positions and certifications, showing year released and album name
Title	Year	Peak chart positions			Album
Title	Year	US Bub.	US R&B/HH Dig.	US Rap Dig.	Album
"Tiger Woods"	2011	—	—	—	Non-album single
"Bat Phone" (featuring Ghetty)	2012	—	—	—	The Golden Alien
"Pat EWiNG" (featuring Ghetty)	2012	—	—	—	Non-album singles
"Tiger Woods" (featuring The Kid Ryan & B.Wash)	2012	—	—	—	Non-album singles
"Ace of Space"	2013	—	—	—	Non-album singles
"Dolce and Gabbana"	2013	—	—	—	Non-album singles
"Mr. Popular"	2013	—	—	—	Non-album singles
"How to Be the Man"	2013	—	—	—	Neon Icon
"Suckas Askin' Questions" (featuring Lil Debbie)	2013	—	—	—	Non-album singles
"Let Me Drive"	2014	—	—	—	Non-album singles
"Real Boyz" (featuring Cap1 & OJ da Juiceman)	2014	—	—	—	Non-album singles
"Tip Toe Wing in My Jawwdinz"	2014	24	36	25	Neon Icon
"Yesterday" (with Snoop Dogg & Collie Buddz)	2014	—	—	—	Non-album singles
"Spazz Out" (with Travis Barker)	2015	—	—	—	Non-album singles
"Carlos Slim"	2016	—	—	—	Peach Panther
"4 Million"	2016	—	—	—	Peach Panther
"Vibe"	2016	—	—	—	Balloween
"Tip Toe 2" (featuring Slim Jxmmi)	2017	—	—	—	Non-album singles
"Strange Times" (featuring Gordy Grace)	2017	—	—	—	Non-album singles
"11 Hour Nap" (featuring Jimmy Wopo and Dice SoHo)	2017	—	—	—	The White West
"Make It Drop" (featuring YG)	2019	—	—	—	Non-album single
"Tip Toe 3" (featuring Chief Keef)	2019	—	—	—	Pink Python
"Treasure Chest" (featuring Chief Keef)	2019	—	—	—	Non-album single
"Hop Out The Lamb"	2020	—	—	—	Vanilla Gorilla
"Water Whippin Wizard" (featuring Yelawolf)	2020	—	—	—	Vanilla Gorilla
"Million Dollar Mullet" (featuring Yelawolf)	2020	—	—	—	Non-album single
"—" denotes a recording that did not chart or was not released in that territory.

=== Collaborative singles ===
List of collaborative singles, showing year released and album name
Title	Year	Album
"Hot Shots Part Deux" (with Action Bronson & Dana Coppafeel)	2012	Non-album singles
"LEANiNNN" (with Ghetty)	2012	Non-album singles
"Brain Freeze" (with Lil Debbie)	2012	Birth of an Icon
"Non Stop" (with Andre Legacy)	2013	Non-album single
"Gotta Get Away" (with DollaBillGates)	2013	Jumpin Out the Gym
"Doctor Pepper" (with Diplo, CL & OG Maco)	2015	Non-album singles
"Fo Sachi" (with Magneto Dayo )	2015	Non-album singles
"Lemon Latte" (with Charlotte Devaney)	2017	Non-album singles
"Big Ballers" (with Philthy Rich & DollaBillGates)	2018	Non-album singles
"Swan In My Pond" (with Jae Mansa)	2020	Non-album singles

=== As featured artist ===
List of singles as featured performer, with selected chart positions, showing year released and album name
Title	Year	Peak chart positions		Album
Title	Year	US Bub.	US Rap	Album
"Bird on a Wire" (Action Bronson featuring Riff Raff)	2012	—	—	Non-album singles
"You Never Know" (Bright Matter featuring Riff Raff)	2012	—	—	Non-album singles
"Money, Clothes, Jewellery" (Deezuz featuring Riff Raff)	2012	—	—	Non-album singles
"Popsicle" (Dog Bus featuring Riff Raff)	2012	—	—	Non-album singles
"Michelle Obama" (Lil Debbie featuring Riff Raff)	2012	—	—	Non-album singles
"Rap Game James Franco (Salisbury Steak Sweater)" (Deezus featuring Riff Raff)	2013	—	—	Non-album singles
"The Illest" (Far East Movement featuring Riff Raff)	2013	7	18	KTown Riot
"Visions of Coleco" (Hyper Crush featuring Riff Raff)	2013	—	—	Vertigo
"Hella Gone" (Spadez featuring Riff Raff & Deniro Farrar)	2013	—	—	Non-album singles
"Stay With You Tonight" (Clinton Sparks featuring Riff Raff)	2014	—	—	Non-album singles
"This Is How We Do" (Katy Perry featuring Riff Raff)	2014	—	—	Non-album singles
"Rookies of the Future" (The Alchemist featuring Riff Raff & Action Bronson)	2014	—	—	Non-album singles
"Who Wants To Rock" (Flux Pavilion featuring Riff Raff)	2015	—	—	Tesla
"Ring Ring Ring" (Young Chop featuring Chief Keef & Riff Raff)	2016	—	—	King Chop
"How That Make U Feel" (Smokepurpp featuring Riff Raff)	2017	—	—	Non-album singles
"Fuck Shit (Remix)" (Lil Toenail featuring Riff Raff)	2017	—	—	Non-album singles
"M.O.B" (Splash Zanotti featuring Lil Pump & Riff Raff)	2017	—	—	Non-album singles
"Want It All" (Harry Fraud & Nacho Picasso featuring Riff Raff)	2018	—	—	Role Model (EP)
"Paradise" (Kasland featuring Riff Raff)	2020	—	—	No More Sick Days
"—" denotes a recording that did not chart or was not released in that territory.

=== Guest appearances ===
- Action Bronson - "Hot Shots Part Deux" (featuring Danna Coppafeel) (2012)
- Kitty - "Orion's Belt" (2012)
- DJ Skee - "R.I.P." (Remix) (featuring Jeezy, Kendrick Lamar, Chris Brown, YG) (2013)
- TrapZillas - "Rainy Day" (featuring Logic Ali, Trouble Andrew) (2013)
- DJ Skee - "Show Out" (Skeemix) (featuring Juicy J, Pimp C, Jeezy, T.I.) (2013)
- Harry Fraud - "Yacht Lash" (featuring Earl Sweatshirt) (2013)
- DJ Skee - "Karate Chop" (Remix) (featuring Lil Wayne, Future) (2013)
- DJ Skee - "Bugatti" (Remix) (2013)
- DJ Skee - "Like Whaaat" (Remix) (featuring Problem, Bad Lucc) (2013)
- Hyper Crush - "Visions of Coleco" (2013)
- Far East Movement - "The Illest" (2013)
- Migos - "Jumpin Out Da Gym" (Remix) (featuring Trinidad James) (2013)
- Doe Boy - "Not At All" (2013)
- Peter Jackson - "I'm In Love With That Money" (featuring OJ Da Juiceman) (2013)
- Migos - "Sorry" (featuring OJ Da Juiceman, Rich The Kid) (2013)
- DollaBillGates - "Fireworks" (2013)
- Diplo - "Crown" (featuring Mike Posner, Boaz Van De Beatz) (2013)
- SD - "Overdose" (2013)
- Slim Dunkin - "Now That I'm On" (Remix) (featuring Future, Sy Ari Da Kid, K Camp) (2013)
- Spadez - "Hella Gone" (featuring Deniro Farrar) (2013)
- DJ Skee - "Started from The Bottom" (Remix) (featuring Drake) (2013)
- Clinton Sparks - "Turnt Up" (featuring 2 Chainz, Waka Flocka Flame) (2013)
- Beautiful Lou - "Long Pinky" (featuring Action Bronson) (2013)
- Diplo - "Rock Steady" (featuring Action Bronson, Mr MFN eXquire, Nicky Da Boy) (2013)
- Grandtheft - "Trampoline" (Remix) (featuring 2 Chainz, Tinie Tempah, ETC!ETC!) (2013)
- Black Dave - "Golden Boys" (2013)
- Rich the Kid - "Famous" (featuring Migos) (2014)
- DJ Noodles - "Instagram" (2014)
- Adrian Lau - "Stopwatch" (featuring Charlie Bars) (2014)
- Far East Movement - "The Illest" (Remix) (featuring Schoolboy Q, B.o.B) (2014)
- Wrekonize - "Easy Money" (Remix) (featuring Bun B, Jackie Chain) (2014)
- Katy Perry - "This Is How We Do" (Remix) (2014)
- BeatKing - "Rambunctious" (featuring Danny Brown) (2014)
- Audio Push - "Fwd Back" (featuring King Chip) (2014)
- Curtis Williams - "Drip" (2014)
- Mike Will Made It - "Syrup In My Soda" (featuring ILoveMakonnen) (2014)
- Mike Will Made It - "Choppin Blades" (featuring Slim Jxmmi of Rae Sremmurd) (2014)
- Kirko Bangz - "I Then Came Dine" (2014)
- Peter Jackson - "Prom Night" (2014)
- The Joker - "F.H.I.T.O." (Remix) (featuring K Camp) (2014)
- DollaBillGates - "Jag Porsche" (2014)
- BeatKing - "Rich N Famous" (featuring Paul Wall) (2015)
- Curren$y - "Froze" (2015)
- Yowda - "Wish That I Was Playin" (2015)
- Dorrough Music - "Drive Reckless" (2015)
- 1st - "Hurtin" (featuring Rich The Kid) (2015)
- J Stalin - "Real Niggaz Only" (featuring Iamsu!) (2015)
- Gucci Mane - "Embarrassed" (featuring Post Malone, Lil B) (2015)
- Gucci Mane - "Bitches Ain't Shit" (featuring Lil B, Sy Ari Da Kid) (2015)
- Gucci Mane - "Scared Of The Dark" (featuring Father) (2015)
- Gucci Mane - "I'm Too Much" (2015)
- Young Chop - "Ring Ring Ring" (featuring Chief Keef) (2016)
- Various Artists - "18 Years" (featuring Slim Thug) (2017)
- DJ Paul - "Real Fake" (2017)
- Smokepurpp - "How That Make U Feel" (2017)
- Splash Zanotti - "M.O.B" (featuring Lil Pump) (2017)
- DollaBillGates - "Walk Drip" (2017)
- Jimmy Wopo - "Move Wit The $" (2017)
- Nacho Picasso - "Want It All" (2018)
- Yung Gravy - "Richard Simmons" (2019)
- DJ Paul, Kordhell - "I Don't Want To Sleep" (2024)
- DJ Paul - "Poped Out A Slingshot" (2026)
