= Vanilla Gorilla =

Vanilla Gorilla may refer to:

- John Henry Daley, American football player
- Blaine Sumner (born 1987), American powerlifter
- Jason Witt (born 1986), American mixed martial artist
- Vanilla Gorilla, a 2020 album by rapper Riff Raff

== See also ==
- Snowflake (gorilla), world's only known gorilla with albinism
