= Markice Moore =

American actor and rapper

- Born: July 31, 1986 (age 40); New Brunswick, New Jersey, U.S.
- Years active: 2005–present

Markice Moore (born July 31, 1986), also known as Kesan, is an American actor, rapper and reality TV personality. He is best known for playing Ryan Payne in Tyler Perry's The Paynes

== Career ==
Moore is known for MTV's From G's to Gents (Season 1) and Warner Bros. Pictures' ATL. He is best known from punching fellow cast member E6 in the face during the reunion episode of MTV's From G's to Gents season 1.

In 2012, Moore portrayed Andrew on The Walking Dead television series. Moore had originally auditioned for the role of T-Dog, which went to IronE Singleton. In 2023, Moore reprised the role in the video game The Walking Dead: Destinies.

In 2018, he earned the role of Ryan Payne on the OWN sitcom, Tyler Perry's The Paynes. Moore's character, Ryan.

== Legal problems ==
In 2010, Moore was charged with cruelty to children, after police investigators determined that he assaulted his infant daughter.

In 2011 the charges against Moore were suspended. He went on to marry his child's mother and had another baby girl.

== Filmography ==
=== Film ===
Year	Title	Role	Notes
2006	ATL	Austin	
2010	Blood Done Sign My Name	Moses	
2011	Seeking Justice	Vandal	
2011	96 Minutes	Keith	
2019	Point Blank	Big D	
2019	South Central Love	Kyrie	
2021	Dutch	Zoom	
2021	The Fight That Never Ends	DeAndre	TV movie
2022	Til My Casket Drops	Tank	
2023	Get Close	Tony	
2023	The Fearless Three	Shawn	
2023	Danksgiving	-	
2023	Spaghetti	Meatball	
2023	45 Seconds	Quenton	
2023	The Hard Hit	Tash	
2023	Packz	Roy	
2024	Dutch II	Zoom	
2024	Get Close 2	Tony	

=== Television ===
Year	Title	Role	Notes
2008	From G's to Gents	Himself	Main Cast: Season 1
2009	Tyler Perry's Meet the Browns	Andrew	Episode: "Meet the Troublemaker"
2011	Reed Between the Lines	Young Man	Episode: "Let's Talk About Ms. Helen's Son, Part 1"
2012	The Walking Dead	Andrew	Recurring Cast: Season 3
2016	Rectify	Tyrus	Recurring Cast: Season 4
2017	Shots Fired	Andrew	Recurring Cast
2017–18	Snowfall	Ray-Ray	Recurring Cast: Season 1, Guest: Season 2
2018	The Oath	Cornell Barnes	Recurring Cast: Season 1
2018	Chicago P.D.	Malik Farber	Episode: "Allegiance"
2018	Tyler Perry's The Paynes	Ryan Payne	Main Cast
2021	BMF	Filmel	Recurring Cast: Season 1
2023	Law & Order: Organized Crime	Tino Alvarez	Episode: "Trap"
2023	Legacy	Ty Simmons	Main Cast
2023–24	Kold X Windy	Marlon	Recurring Cast: Season 1, Main Cast: Season 2

=== Video games ===
Year	Title	Role
2023	The Walking Dead: Destinies	Andrew (voice)
