= Riff Raff (rapper) =

American rapper (born 1982)

- Riff Raff performing in 2011

Background information
- Born: Horst Christian Simco; January 29, 1982 (age 44); Houston, Texas, U.S.
- Genres: Comedy hip-hop; EDM; chopped and screwed
- Occupation: Rapper
- Years active: 2005–present
- Labels: Beartrap Sound; Empire; Universal; Neon Nation Corporation; Mad Decent; Stacks on Deck
- Formerly of: Three Loco

Horst Christian Simco (born January 29, 1982), known professionally as Riff Raff (often stylized as RiFF RAFF), is an American rapper from Katy, Texas. He was originally managed by Swishahouse co-founder OG Ron C in 2011. After initially signing with Soulja Boy's record label Stacks on Deck Entertainment, Simco signed with producer Diplo's Mad Decent label to release his debut studio album, Neon Icon (2014). Despite mixed critical response, it moderately entered the Billboard 200 along with his second album Peach Panther (2016), which was released by Warner Records. Prior to the latter's release, Simco entered a US$4 million joint partnership with Stampede Management and BMG for his Neon Nation label and production company. The joint deal fell apart in the wake of legal disputes following the release of the 2012 film Spring Breakers.

Simco was formerly a member of the hip hop group Three Loco, along with Andy Milonakis and Dirt Nasty, who reunited on his Balloween 2016 Halloween mixtape performing "Bitches in My Driveway". The trio premiered a Christmas parody song, "Ho-Ho-Loco", on the TBS Surprise! Instant Xmas Carol special. In February 2018, Riff Raff signed with singer Blackbear's Beartrap Sound for a reported US$500,000.

== Early life ==
Simco was born on January 29, 1982, in Houston, Texas, to Anita Isaacs, a maid, and Ronald Simco, a Vietnam War veteran with severe post-traumatic stress disorder, who worked various jobs, including as a police officer and Walmart manager. His mother grew up in Shaker Heights, Ohio, descending from a family of German Jews and Lithuanian Jews that included several survivors and victims of the Holocaust. Riff Raff is the second of four siblings. He and his family lived in Copperfield, a suburb 25 miles northwest of Houston. Growing up he was obsessed with basketball, playing frequently with other children in his neighborhood. The Simcos had moved to nearby Stone Creek. He attended Langham Creek High School, where he was shooting guard on his school's basketball team, before dropping out in his senior year. Shortly thereafter he obtained his GED.

After his parents divorced, his father was diagnosed with tonsil cancer and the family moved to Duluth, Minnesota, to get his father out of the heat into a cooler environment. For a time, Riff Raff and his siblings were shuttled back and forth between Duluth and Houston, where their mother remained. In 2001, he enrolled at Hibbing Community College in Hibbing, Minnesota, where he played on the basketball team for a month and majored in liberal arts. Feeling out of place, he dropped out in 2003 and moved back to Houston, where he painted cars in the in-vogue "candy-colored" style and gradually built his new identity. He eventually relocated to Los Angeles and began to take his rapping career seriously.

== Music career ==
=== 2008–2009: Beginnings ===
Riff Raff started rapping in 2005, making homemade CDs of his rapping over other artists' beats, and passing them out at various malls in the Greater Houston Area including Katy Mills Mall. He credited his early influences being Texas veteran rappers Devin the Dude and Paul Wall. Riff Raff took advantage of social media on Myspace, YouTube and WorldStarHipHop in late 2008, releasing songs, freestyle-videos, and sketch clips, which showcased his talent as slapstick and performance art. He did this with the help of his first talent manager, DB da Boss, whose studio provided recording and video services. DB spoke with LA Weekly about the rapper, saying "He was very driven, very ambitious. You couldn't deny his work ethic", going on to say, "Underneath that shell is a very intelligent man." He looked up to Northside Houston rappers from label Swishahouse, who were blowing up around that time, including Paul Wall, Chamillionaire and Slim Thug. He began doing his hair up in braids popular among "Northsiders" like Slim Thug and shopping for bling at TV Jewelry, a store co-owned by Paul Wall and charismatic Vietnamese immigrant "TV" Johnny Dang, from whom Riff Raff also purchased gold grills. Like many other artists from Houston, Riff Raff also spent much of his time selling CDs at colleges and malls, occasionally alongside other local talent such at Fat Tony and Freestyle Bully.

In an effort to get on television he went on many auditions, including for a part in a peanut butter commercial intended for a teenager. He and his friend also tried out for P. Diddy's Making the Band, to no avail. He was so determined to become famous that he flew to Atlanta to try out for MTV's reality show From G's to Gents. When he learned that he had made the cast for the program's second season, before taping had even begun, he immediately got a giant MTV logo tattooed on his neck and adjusted his stage name to "MTV Riff Raff". Though he was eliminated from the series on the second episode, he left an impression on viewers through his extravagant way of dressing and funny ad-libs. Upon the season's debut in early 2009, appearance on the show would garner an immediate reaction to him, which catapulted his career.

The same year actor, comedian and rapper Simon Rex noticed Riff Raff after being shown to him by notable producer The Alchemist. Rex contacted Riff Raff after watching one of his freestyle videos in which he revealed his phone number, and soon enough the two became friends and began recording as Riff Raff and Dirt Nasty. The pair later formed a rap group Three Loco along with comedian Andy Milonakis, increasing Riff Raff's popularity by tapping into the two celebrities' fan bases.

=== 2010–2012: SODMG, Mad Decent, various mixtapes ===
Beginning in 2011, Riff Raff began to be managed by OG Ron C (of Swishahouse fame) and moved to Los Angeles. Riff Raff then started releasing more music videos that furthered the artist's internet fame. Those include songs such as "Jose Canseco", and "Marc Jacobs". Then in mid-2011, Riff Raff signed to Soulja Boy's label S.O.D. Money Gang Inc. Riff Raff joined Soulja Boy's SODMG label before they met in person; no paperwork was ever signed. However, Riff Raff still wore the imprint's chain, got its logo tattooed, and again adjusted his stage name, this time to Riff Raff SODMG. They would remain affiliated for around a year, but the label did not push or pay Riff Raff, which would result in him leaving the label. Soulja Boy publicly called Riff Raff a "cokehead" following their split.

Some time before the official split Riff Raff affiliated with producers such as Diplo and Harry Fraud, as well as with Queens rapper Action Bronson. The music video he released for his collaboration with Fraud and Bronson, "Bird on a Wire", hit the one million plays-mark in roughly two months. "Bird on a Wire" was listed as the 27th best song of 2012 by Complex Music.

In early 2012 he would release music videos for the songs, "Larry Bird", "Time" and the Chief Keef collaboration "Cuz My Gear", among others. In April 2012, Riff Raff also announced a collaborative album with Diplo tentatively titled Jody Highroller with guests Skrillex, Usher, Soulja Boy, Gucci Mane, Mystikal and Rusko. In June 2012, Riff Raff released the .Summer of Surf mixtape. He signed with Diplo's label Mad Decent in June 2012. The same year he released the album, The Golden Alien, independently in July which feature tracks produced by MikeChekMusic, "Freeze Dried", "Obtuse Angle". It was followed by the release of the mixtape, Birth of an Icon, in August, which was listed by Stereogum as their "Mixtape of the Week".

=== 2013–2014: Neon Icon ===
Following the release of his mixtape Hologram Panda with producer Dame Grease, Riff Raff told MTV that his upcoming Mad Decent second studio album would be titled Riff Raff, The Neon Icon, later shortened to Neon Icon. In February 2013 he told Complex that his second studio album is due out some time during the third quarter of 2013.

On June 25, 2013, he released a single titled "Dolce & Gabbana", produced by DJ Carnage as the first single from Neon Icon, however two days later he announced that the song wouldn't be included on the album. He was also featured on Far East Movement's single "The Illest" around the same time. Then on July 12, 2013, he released another non album single titled "Mr. Popular", and four days later released the music video for the song. In August 2013, Riff Raff announced that he would be releasing a collaboration album with Action Bronson titled Galaxy Gladiators in 2014.

On November 26, 2013, he released the first official single for Neon Icon titled "How To Be the Man" and produced by DJ Mustard. That same month, Riff Raff told Rolling Stone in an interview that leading up to the album's release he would release various "left-over" tracks from the album's recording sessions These notably included the Boi-1da produced "Real Boyz", featuring rappers OJ da Juiceman and Cap 1, as well as "Suckas Askin' Questions" with Lil Debbie and "Shoulda Won a Grammy" with Action Bronson. In March 2014, prior to the album's release, Rolling Stone included the album on their list of "27 Must-Hear Albums of 2014". On May 20, 2014, Riff Raff announced through his Twitter that after much delay, Neon Icon was scheduled for a June 24, 2014, release date. The same day the official track listing for the album was revealed, which included previously announced collaborations Mac Miller, Childish Gambino, Paul Wall, Mike Posner and Amber Coffman of Dirty Projectors as well as Slim Thug.

On the 2015 Vans Warped Tour, Riff Raff hired We Came As Romans' bassist Andy Glass to play bass for him on the tour.

=== 2015–2017: Peach Panther and Aquaberry Aquarius ===
Riff Raff announced his intention to release his second studio album Peach Panther on June 1, 2015. The first single, "Spazz Out" featuring production from Travis Barker was released around this time, however the album itself would end up being delayed until 2016. He then released an EP entitled Trench Coat Towers in early November 2015. He extended the release date for Peach Panther several times, with early 2016 being cited on his Instagram as the current date. He was also featured on several singles during 2015, including "Doctor Pepper" with Diplo, CL, and OG Maco, and Flux Pavilion's single "Who Wants to Rock". In early 2016 he released the first single from Peach Panther, "Carlos Slim". The album was eventually released on June 24, 2016.

In April 2016, Riff Raff announced a partnership with Stampede Management and BMG, raising US$4 million for his Neon Nation Corporation to invest in music as well as in "movies and talent across the globe to build an entertainment empire." Since his second studio album Peach Panther he has released 3 projects with DJ Afterthought starting out with 2016 Halloween mixtape, "BALLOWEEN" featuring Quavo, Skepta, Trae tha Truth, Travis Barker and many more. Most of the songs off "BALLOWEEN" have been stashed away for month's and were finally released. Next, January 30, 2017 Aquaberry Aquarius dropped having super stars Wiz Khalifa and Lisa Cimorelli from the 6 sister group Cimorelli, also having underground famous rap stars Bones, Fat Nick and Germ. "The White West", referring to himself as "the white Kanye West" dropped August 4, 2017, having upcoming artists like Dice SoHo and Jimmy Wopo on the project.

=== 2018–present: Cool Blue Jewels and Pink Python ===
On February 9, 2018, Riff Raff and DJ Afterthought released the album Cool Blue Jewels with features from Wiz Khalifa, Chevy Woods, Jimmy Wopo, Young Buck and Project Pat, among others. On November 9, 2018, Riff Raff released a mixtape titled Tangerine Tiger with guest appearances from Z-Ro, Lil Tracy, Ricki Rich among others. On April 12, 2019, Riff Raff released his third studio album titled Pink Python with guest appearances from Chief Keef, J-Dawg, and Killah Priest. Riff Raff premiered his single "Jazzmine" with the Houston Chronicle, a remake of "A Whole New World" from Aladdin featuring Iliana Eve, Jonathan Hay, Aneesa Badshaw, Ranna Royce and others. On October 25, 2019, Riff Raff released his fourth studio album titled Cranberry Vampire, with appearances from Simon Rex, Andy Milonakis, Chief Keef, and others.

== Other ventures ==
On "Double Cup", an episode of FXX's Major Lazer, he made a guest appearance as Double Cup, The Codeine Scientist.

Riff Raff competed on a special for the MTV reality series The Challenge, premiering November 21, 2017, and titled Champs vs. Stars.

On February 15, 2012, film director Harmony Korine contacted Riff Raff about appearing in an upcoming movie of his, which would turn out to be Spring Breakers. Once the details of the movie came out, there was speculation that the main character Alien was based on Riff Raff. However, according to James Franco, his character was based on the underground rap artist Dangeruss. He said "Of course Harmony and I looked at some of Riff Raff's videos as inspiration, but he was one of a number of people we looked at. I would say the biggest influence on the role was this local Florida rapper named Dangeruss. He's fairly unknown, but he was down there in the place, living the life, and he became the biggest model for me, and he's in the movie." There was much back and forth between both camps about the issue, including Riff Raff appearing in a cameo for One Life to Live playing a character called "Jamie Franko". In July 2013, Riff Raff announced he was suing the creators of Spring Breakers for $10 million for using his image without permission. However, a search for court documents by LA Weekly in September 2013 resulted in no findings.

In 2017, Riff Raff partnered with Reef Dispensaries to develop and endorse two new strains of marijuana. Riff Raff has also collaborated with the cannabis subscription box company Daily High Club to create a Riff Raff smoking supply box containing smoking products and accessories inspired by his stage persona.

== Personal life ==
Riff Raff has a large number of tattoos, including the logos for WorldStarHipHop, NBA, and MTV, which he had acquired during auditions for the 2009 reality TV show From G's to Gents. Previously, he had a BET tattoo on the front of his right shoulder, which was later covered up with a tattoo of his dog, "Jody Husky". He is a fan of The Simpsons, with a tattoo of Bart holding test tubes that reads "The Freestyle Scientist" on his chest. He also has a large gothic cross below his left shoulder, framed by a prayer that reads, "Dear Jesus, Please Let Me In. Your Child, Horst Simco."

=== Legal issues ===
On August 11, 2013, Riff Raff was arrested in Greensboro, North Carolina after police found an open container of alcohol, marijuana, another unspecified illegal substance and drug paraphernalia in his vehicle. Riff Raff was booked into jail along with the two passengers in his vehicle, and was released without bail later that night.

On May 31, 2018, Riff Raff was accused of drugging and raping a woman after a 2013 show in Melbourne. All venues on his Australian and New Zealand tour subsequently canceled his scheduled concerts. Afterward, a second woman, aged 17 at the time, alleged that in Milwaukee, Riff Raff invited her on his tour bus; according to the accuser, he proceeded to touch her repeatedly while making suggestive comments.

On January 22, 2020, Riff Raff settled a lawsuit related to a sexual assault claim made against him, from a 2014 incident at a Nevada brothel.

== Discography ==
Studio albums

- Neon Icon (2014)
- Peach Panther (2016)
- Alcoholic Alligator (2018)
- Pink Python (2019)
- Cranberry Vampire (2019)
- Vanilla Gorilla (2020)
- Welcome to Shaolin (2025)
- Neon Nighthawk (2026)

== Filmography ==
Television
Year	TV show	Role
2009	From G's to Gents	Himself
2013	One Life to Live	Jamie Franko
2013	Ridiculousness Betas	Himself
2014	Wild 'n Out	Himself
2015	Major Lazer	Double Cup (voice)
2017	Peach Panther	Himself
2017	The Challenge: Champs vs. Stars	Himself
2020	Sonic the Hedgehog	Himself; scenes deleted
