= Down Low (film) =

2023 film by Rightor Doyle

- Release poster
- Directed by: Rightor Doyle
- Written by: Lukas Gage; Phoebe Fisher
- Produced by: Ashley Fox; Lucas Wiesendanger; Ross Katz
- Starring: Zachary Quinto; Lukas Gage; Simon Rex; Audra McDonald; Judith Light
- Cinematography: Nate Hurtsellers
- Edited by: Mike S. Smith; David Moritz
- Music by: Adam Crystal
- Production companies: FilmNation Entertainment; Sui Generis Pictures
- Distributed by: Stage 6 Films
- Release dates: March 11, 2023 (SXSW); October 10, 2023
- Running time: 91 minutes
- Country: United States
- Language: English

Down Low is a 2023 American comedy film, directed by Rightor Doyle, from a screenplay by Lukas Gage and Phoebe Fisher. It stars Zachary Quinto, Gage, Simon Rex, Audra McDonald, and Judith Light.

It had its world premiere at South by Southwest on March 11, 2023. It was released on October 10, 2023, by Stage 6 Films.

== Plot ==
Gary, a newly divorced father of two, hires Cameron as a masseur and sex worker. After a brief dispute between the two men, Cameron learns that Gary is closeted and has never had sex with a man before. Cameron decides to help Gary by inviting over Sammy from Plungr, an anonymous gay hookup app. Sammy arrives, but is not attracted to Gary, and gets into a physical confrontation with Cameron. As the argument escalates, Sammy rushes to tackle Cameron, who Gary saves by pushing him out of the way. In the process, Sammy crashes through Gary's window and lands on Gary's stoop. Gary and Cameron then get into an argument over hiding Sammy's body. Cameron storms off, but returns later and helps Gary get the body into his house.

Cameron and Gary brainstorm how to get rid of the body, when Sandy, Gary's neighbor, arrives at the house. Cameron and Gary keep her distracted for a while but she eventually sees the body. Panicked, she evades them in the house and ends up stuck inside a closet. Cameron and Gary then decide to hire Buck, a necrophiliac from the dark web, to get rid of Sammy's body. He arrives and helps the two men clean the house, which is stained with blood. As the three become closer, Gary reveals that he has one month to live due to a brain tumor. He expresses regret for his conformist lifestyle and resents himself for living a boring life. He further reveals that his wife left him when he came out as gay. The three men smoke crack cocaine together and go for a swim. As the day breaks, they finish cleaning the house, and the three men realize that Sammy's body is missing. They see him limping away from Gary's home, and Buck runs him over in order to get the body he sees as rightfully his. Cameron and Gary then kill Buck and find that Sandy cannot remember the events of the previous night due to the interaction between her medication and the wine she drank. She leaves, and Gary and Cameron bury both corpses in unmarked graves. Gary and Cameron then have sex.

One month later, Cameron receives an invitation to Gary's funeral. He shows up and confronts Gary's ex-wife, Patty and the gathered mourners. He accuses them of corrupting Gary's legacy, as he would have hated to be buried by the church and family that rejected him when he came out. Patty explains how both she and Gary struggled with their choices and for not becoming who they want because they wasted time being somebody else for each other. Cameron apologizes and Gary's son thanks him for convincing his father to reach out to them. Cameron then steals Gary's body and drives it to the lake adjoining Gary's house. He fills Gary's pockets with rocks and drags his body into the lake, where it begins to sink. The movie ends with a shot of Cameron reaching out for Gary's arm in the style of The Creation of Adam.

== Cast ==
- Zachary Quinto as Gary
- Lukas Gage as Cameron
- Judith Light as Sandy
- Simon Rex as Buck
- Audra McDonald as Patty
- Sebastian Arroyo as Sammy
- Christopher Reed Brown as Raymond
- Dominique Lawson as Mitchell

== Production ==
In May 2021, it was announced Rightor Doyle would direct the film, from a screenplay by Lukas Gage and Phoebe Fisher, with FilmNation Entertainment set to produce. In October 2021, it was announced Gage, Zachary Quinto, Simon Rex, Audra McDonald, Judith Light and Sebastian Arroyo had joined the cast of the film.

== Release ==
Down Low had its world premiere at 2023 South by Southwest Film & TV Festival on March 11, 2023. It was released on October 10, 2023, by Stage 6 Films.

== Reception ==
On the review aggregator website Rotten Tomatoes, 71% of 14 critics' reviews are positive, with an average rating of 6.5/10. Metacritic, which uses a weighted average, assigned the film a score of 48 out of 100, based on four critics, indicating "mixed or average" reviews.
