= From G's to Gents season 1 =

From G's to Gents
- Season 1
- Starring: Fonzworth Bentley; C. Frederick Secrease as Frederick
- No. of episodes: 11

Release
- Original network: MTV
- Original release: July 15 – September 23, 2008

Season chronology
- Next → season 2

The first season of the MTV reality television series From G's to Gents featured 14 misdirected young men willing to change their lives and become gentlemen. The show is hosted by Fonzworth Bentley, and premiered on MTV on July 15, 2008. The objective of the show is to make the transformation from a roughneck to a sophisticated gentleman within the given time. In the end, Thaddeus aka Creepa was decided upon to be the most transformed and refined gentleman, winning the cash prize of $100,000 and membership in The Gentleman's Club.

Voting for the season was overseen by Isaac Berkeley DeWilliams III, a close friend and confidant of Bentley. Despite his close and oftentimes intimate relationships with contestants, primarily male, he led the episodic voting process.

== Elimination table ==
This elimination table shows all of the eliminations which occurred during the show.

Cast members
Name	Reason for elimination	Episode eliminated
Pretty Ricky	Eliminated: Pretty Ricky for being intoxicated, urinating on the house wall, wearing a white jacket over his Navy blazer at the Chapter meeting, and ultimately doing nothing to show he wanted to change.	Episode 1
The Truth	Eliminated: The Truth for speaking over Mr. Bentley, being very talkative, and disrespecting the other members, including a small altercation with E6.	Episode 1
Mikey P	Eliminated: Bentley thought Mikey P. was already in a stable position in his life, plus he told him that he has to "be" a gentleman, not to act like a gentleman, and was sent home because of this.	Episode 2
Zenel	Eliminated: Model and actor Zenel was eliminated from the show when Mr. Bentley discovered that Zenel has/had a modeling contract and did not need the experience that a contestant would go through.	Episode 2
J Boogie	Eliminated: J Boogie because it was discovered that he worked as an office assistant at a laboratory.	Episode 3
Kesan	Eliminated: A confrontation between Kesan and Creepa concerning Kesan being on the phone with his girlfriend too long resulted in Kesan being put into a playful choke hold by his "big brother" Creepa. Kesan didn't sleep that night and went around the next day threatening his housemates' sleep time with a knife. Due to the constant disagreement with the rest of the group as well as him explaining his anger problem, Kesan was evicted from the house/club after the others had an intervention with Bentley about the situation.	Episode 5
Shaun	Eliminated: Mr. Bentley thought of Shaun as "too smart" for the competition and so did Shaun himself. Shaun decided to black ball himself at the Chapter meeting.	Episode 6
Stan	Eliminated: Stan for his disrespect towards women, and Bentley's feeling that Stan was not interested in resolving this issue.	Episode 6
D-Boy	Eliminated: D-Boy's consistent disrespect to the other cast members consequently led to his demise at the Chapter meeting when Bentley felt that D-boy wasn't progressing.	Episode 7
T-Jones	Eliminated: T-Jones was eliminated because Mr. Bentley felt the other members of the house (most of whom were fathers) needed the money more than he did.	Episode 8
E6	Eliminated: E6 was eliminated because Bentley felt that he needed to be at home with his children more than he needed to be in the house. Mr. Bentley thought E6 as lacked the "sense of devotion" to see his kids.	Episode 9
Cee	Eliminated: Bentley felt he still had a lot to deal with his con problems.	Episode 10
Shotta	Eliminated: Bentley felt that Creepa deserved to win because Shotta had had previous chances to develop in life, whereas Creepa had not.	Episode 10

== Episode progress ==
Episode Progress
#	Contestants	Episodes										
#	Contestants	1	2	3	4	5	6	7	8	9	10^{*}	
1	Creepa	RISK^{1}	SAFE	WIN	SAFE	SAFE	SAFE	RISK	**SAFE**	SAFE	WIN^{3}	WINNER
2	Shotta	SAFE	WIN	SAFE	WIN	SAFE	WIN	RISK^{2}	RISK^{1}	SAFE	RISK^{1}	OUT
3	Cee	SAFE	SAFE	RISK^{2}	RISK^{1}	SAFE	WIN	WIN	WIN	RISK^{3}	OUT^{1}	
4	E6	RISK^{1}	WIN	SAFE^{1}	WIN	SAFE	WIN	SAFE	RISK^{1}	OUT^{1}		
5	T-Jones	SAFE	SAFE	WIN	RISK^{5}	WIN	WIN	WIN	OUT^{3}			
6	D-Boy	SAFE	SAFE^{1}	RISK^{3}	SAFE	SAFE	RISK^{2}	OUT^{4}				
7	Stan	SAFE	WIN	WIN	RISK^{1}	SAFE	OUT^{2}					
8	Shaun	SAFE	WIN	WIN	RISK^{2}	SAFE	OUT^{4}					
9	Kesan	SAFE	RISK^{7}	WIN	WIN	OUT						
10	J-boogie	SAFE	SAFE	OUT^{4}								
11	Zenel	SAFE	OUT^{2}									
12	Mikey P	SAFE	OUT^{2}									
13	The Truth	OUT^{5}										
14	Pretty Ricky	OUT^{7}										

The contestant won the competition.
The contestant won the challenge and was safe from elimination.
The contestant did not win the challenge but was safe from being eliminated.
The contestant was at risk of being eliminated.
The contestant's membership was denied.
The contestant was eliminated without a chapter meeting.

Number after status indicates number of Black Balls received in voting.
The contestant in italic text was chosen by the winners of the challenge to be up for elimination.
The contestant in bold text was chosen by the winner of the challenge to be safe.

^{*}The contestant with the most black balls advanced while the two contestants with the least were up for elimination.

== Episodes ==
=== Episode 1 - Gees Whiz ===
First aired July 15, 2008

The G's present themselves to Fonzworth Bentley. As soon as the G's get into the house, many of them begin to bicker amongst themselves, the biggest conflict being between The Truth and around six other G's, led by the Creepa and E6. Each G is interviewed by Bentley separately over the process of the first episode. Bentley gets a chance to pick up some first impressions of the G's, for example Creepa gives off a bad first impression at first when he is seen falling asleep during his interview with Bentley, but he wakes up and takes off his "hater blockers" and told Fonzworth why he needs this. Also, Pretty Ricky comes into the interview very drunk and is unable to even comprehend what Bentley is actually asking him.

Eliminated: Pretty Ricky, for being intoxicated throughout the episode, wearing a white jacket over the traditional club blazer at the Chapter meeting and ultimately doing nothing to show he wanted to change.

Eliminated: The Truth, mainly for being extremely talkative, speaking over Mr. Bentley during the interview and disrespecting the other members. Additionally, the other contestants felt negatively towards him, most notably E6 (who he was shown having an argument with earlier in the show).

=== From G To GQ ===
First aired July 22, 2008

The G's are divided into three teams and must prepare outfits for three different events. The teams are then judged based on their outfits. While D-Boy is using the restroom, Kesan says he will "fuck D-Boy's mother with Sonia's Spoon", causing the rest of the house to turn against Kesan. Cee discovers an "X" drawn on his photograph. Cee then threatens whoever drew on his photo, and offers $500 to anyone who reveals who drew on his photograph. Cee then reveals to the viewer that he is "the greatest con artist" and drew on his own photograph so that the other people in the house will pity him, thus he will be safe from elimination. Mikey P snitches to Fonzworth Bentley about Kesan's earlier threats and tells Fonzworth Bentley that he owns a four bedroom house, a motorcycle, and a car. At the elimination ceremony, Fonzworth Bentley has Kesan apologize to D-Boy, who accepts his apology.

Eliminated: Mikey P, his presence was not necessary in the mansion because he, as he told the viewers and Mr. Bentley himself, had a four-bedroom house, a car, and a motorcycle. He did not need it like others such as Shotta did, said by Mr. Bentley.

Eliminated: Zenel, he had everything going well for him with his modeling and acting career. Like Mikey, he also didn't need it.

=== Play Or Be Played ===
First aired July 29, 2008

The G's learn lessons in sportsmanship and etiquette while being taught cricket, a refined gentleman's sport. When they are challenged by a bunch of young punks out to push their buttons, the G's must then take the lessons they learned on the cricket field and apply them to the basketball court. They must maintain their sportsmanlike ways or the "etiquette ref" will rule against them. Later in the house, Kesan overheard Cee and D-Boy talking about him taken out of the house. He decided that he was going to get out, but Shaun stopped to talk to him and Creepa came later. Both of them helped Kesan move back in, but were confronted by D-Boy and E6. Kesan later talked to Fonzworth Bentley about his situation and he decided to stay.

Eliminated: J Boogie mentioned that he worked as an office assistant and in a laboratory so Mr. Bentley did not feel as if J Boogie needed to be in the competition as much as the other participants.

=== Buckle Down or Bottoms Up ===
First aired August 6, 2008

The gents were asked to write resumes within one hour to present to Sean Yazbeck, the winner of season 5 of the Apprentice. Kesan was praised for his ability to convince the CEO. Because his resume was so exaggerated, it angered other contestants who were given criticism on their resumes. Soon after, they were split up into groups of three to create a marketing campaign for the world-music group Thunderkatz. They were given a night to work on it, and Kesan, Shotta, and E6 worked all night, eventually leading to their challenge win. T-Jones, however, became drunk and did no work. In the end, Cee, Stan, Shaun, and T-Jones were blackballed and at risk. Shaun and Cee were told to rejoin the group, leaving Stan and T-Jones in the bottom two. Bentley announces that Stan is safe, and T-Jones breaks into tears. As T-Jones discusses his actions with Bentley, Bentley discovers that T-Jones is homeless, and feels that he is sincere about his changing, warning him that this will be his last chance to change.

Eliminated: None

=== Ladies Night At The Club ===
First aired August 12, 2008

The Gents were given a lesson in chivalry and were then asked to host a "female fan appreciation" party for superstar group Danity Kane. The Gents were unaware that all the ladies were actually going to judge them on their chivalry skills. Stan was in fear of elimination because he allowed some of the women talk him into letting them take a body shot off of him. Kesan thought it was best to focus on two of the elderly females there to make them feel more welcome in a house full of younger men and women but it was overlooked and Kesan said in an interview, "being the teachers pet doesn't pay off." T-Jones won the competition and was chosen unanimously by all the women to be the most chivalrous. At the end of the night there was a confrontation between Kesan and Creepa after Kesan was on the phone with his girlfriend too long resulting in Kesan being put into a playful choke hold by his "big brother" (Creepa). Kesan didn't sleep that night and went around the next day threatening his house mates' sleep time with a knife. Due to the constant disagreement with the rest of the group as well as him explaining his anger problem, Kesan was ejected out of the house/club after the others had an intervention with Bentley about it.

Eliminated: Kesan, because he had threatened his other house mates in the club for his revenge.

=== Real Talk, Seriously Speaking ===
First aired August 19, 2008

The Gents were given a lesson on eloquence. They were tested on conversing in talking about the given pictures in an art gallery. Team B (Stan, Shaun, Creepa, and D-Boy) was ahead 3–0, when Team A (Cee, T. Jones, Shotta, and E6) caught up, eventually winning the challenge and immunity. They also won a trip to a club, paid exclusively from Mr. Bentley. Cee was caught kissing a girl, which T. Jones didn't like. During elimination, Shaun, D-Boy, and Stan were all at risk and two were to be eliminated. Shaun explained that he voted for himself, leaving Mr. Bentley disappointed and rejecting him membership. D-Boy stated he wanted to be here and wanted to leave a changed man with or without the $100,000. Stan was eliminated because his problem cannot be solved in the club.

Eliminated: Shaun, because he felt he has been changed already and thinks he doesn't need the money.

Eliminated: Stan, because his problem with women annoys the other housemates and it cannot be solved in the club.

=== It's Not Over Till The Fat Boy Sings ===
First aired August 26, 2008

The Gents were given a lesson on proper table manners. Then Mr. Bentley told the Gents to divide into 3 groups of two. The challenge was to show respect and proper table manners to the Japanese associates Mr. Bentley sent, otherwise they will be excused. The surprise is that Mr. Bentley is watching the whole thing in the other room, and the dinner was served as a nyotaimori (sushi on a naked woman's body). The gents were late because Creepa and Shotta were sleeping. In the challenge, Creepa was excused from the room because he failed to recite back the names of the gentleman. Then E6 was excused, followed by Shotta. Then Cee was excused for talking with his mouth full. T. Jones and D-Boy were left in the challenge. Both ate the blowfish and prayed, but T. Jones decided to sing, which impressed the Japanese businessmen, thus allowing him and Cee to win the challenge. Back in the house, T. Jones and Cee decided to risk D-Boy for being the weakest link until Creepa showed up to ask who they wanted to risk. Then they changed their minds to risk Creepa because he hadn't changed at all. During the chapter meeting, Creepa was surprised he was risked and threatened Cee, but was restrained by Mr. Bentley. D-Boy and Shotta were also being risked with Creepa. Shotta was sent back with the other gents, leaving Creepa and D-Boy. Creepa pleaded that he wanted to change and be a gentleman, thus Mr. Bentley eliminated D-Boy because he was risked for three times.

Eliminated: D-Boy, because he had not won a single event among his peers and showed no real change as compared to his peers.

=== Sick Of Being A G ===
First aired September 2, 2008

The Gents were given a lesson of financial management. The challenge is to come up with a business and present on how it is going to manage well. Creepa thought about his choices of change to a gentleman so he decided to give his bling to Frederick. They were supposed to be divided to groups of two, with one gent working by himself. Cee decided to work himself, while T. Jones and Shotta paired up and Creepa and E6 paired up. They gave out their proposals to a business expert; later the gents were treated to a dinner and a club. Creepa was drunk and had to be dragged back to the house. This resulted the next day for mediocre performance for him and E6. The judges were impressed by Cee's passion and T. Jones's and Shotta's strategy, but they gave it to Cee because of the passion of his dreams of a radio station. Cee won a thousand dollars plus the power to save another gent from elimination. Creepa was stressed and had high blood pressure. Cee heard about this and decided to save Creepa from elimination. During chapter meeting, T. Jones, Shotta, and E6 were all at risk. Mr. Bentley found out that E6 was a father of his kids he never knew so he decided to let him back to the stand. It was a hard decision for Mr. Bentley so he asked Shotta how much he wanted this. Shotta looked at him in the eye and pleaded he really wanted this and will work hard. Mr. Bentley asks T. Jones what will happen if he went home tonight. T. Jones stated he would go to his mom and eat macaroni and cheese. He eliminated T. Jones.

Eliminated: T-Jones, due to Mr. Bentley's feelings that the other G's needed the money more because the remaining G's have children to support. Mr. Bentley unlike the previous eliminations was actually very proud of T-Jones, and thinks that T-Jones is going to do well.

=== G Therapy ===
First aired September 9, 2008

With four G's remaining it is time to take things closer to home. Mr. Bentley brings in a very special guest that will delve into the G's past. Emotions run high as the G's reveal painful memories that have scarred their lives. Has time really healed their wounds? The G's welcome their families into the house but the happiness quickly dissolves as one of the G's deep family secrets is exposed. In elimination the G's show their true colors as one G's membership is denied.

Creepa was met by his mother, Shotta by his mother and son, Cee by his ex-girlfriend and daughter, and E-6 by his ex-girlfriend and son. Many of them had an emotional reunion with their loved ones; in contrast, E-6's reunion was much less spectacular due to him not being around his son. The G's then had a dinner with their relatives and Mr. Bentley, during which they discussed how much they had progressed from where they were before the show began. Cee in particular expresses how much he loved his ex-girlfriend, Gina, and noted that when he finished becoming the person he should have been all along, he would marry her. Creepa riled himself up after his mother didn't tell everyone exactly what was holding him back. This caused him to argue with his mother over the table, ending the dinner. After a discussion with Mr. Bentley, he apologized to his mother and told her he's determined to change.

Eliminated: E6, because he lived within 2 miles of his kid, and never visited him. Mr. Bentley thought it would be better that he goes home, and takes care of his family. Creepa was at serious risk because of his behavior at the dinner table, but was given another chance by Mr. Bentley since no one blackballed him.

=== 100 G's For 1 Gentleman ===
First aired September 16, 2008

In the final elimination night, Cee was eliminated by his past counterparts (E6, T. Jones, Stan, D-Boy, and Shaun), only receiving one vote, which left Shotta, and Creepa to battle it out in all out gentlemen affair. Shotta and Creepa were given the final challenge to present a formal speech to Mr. Bentley on their transformation from a gangster to a gentleman. Creepa surprised Bentley by taking this elimination to the next level and cut off all of his hair. He went on to win it all the $100,000 cash prize and the title of "From G's To Gents." Creepa and Shotta had a fierce battle to win it all, but in the end Creepa earned the right to be considered the true Gentleman. Mr. Bentley then stated that he would pay for Shotta's training to become a barber, and then help him open his own barbershop.

=== Reunion Special ===
First aired September 23, 2008

Mr. Bentley brought all the contestants together. He interviewed T-Jones, Cee, Shotta, Kesan, & Creepa and what had happened since the selected G's left the club. T-Jones is now selling his own calendars and clocks. Cee has separated from Gina, but he still sees his daughter. Shotta has moved from Brooklyn, New York to Los Angeles for barber school and does his job at the place where he got his shave. Mr. Bentley gave Shotta a check for $5,000 plus a shaving kit. Although Kesan has an anger management coach, he has clearly not corrected his issues as he punched E6 just before the show was aired. Thaddeus (formerly known as Creepa) came out finally as a gentleman to talk about his transformation.

=== Ain't Nutting But a G Strang (Special) ===
This clip appeared on the limited edition "From G's to Gents: After Hours" DVD released in 2009, featuring scenes and episodes not included on the show's initial release.

The scene opens with a silent, lingering shot of an empty beer bottle sitting on Mr. Bentley's bedside table; the contestants having been made to swear off alcohol the previous episode.

Mr. Bentley frustratedly awakes the contestants, kicking Kesan in the stomach as he attempts to rise from bed. Mr. Bentley's frustration suddenly fades as he stares at the contestants in silence; eyes glazed and distant. The cameramen are asked to leave the room as Mr. Bentley and DeWilliams progress through the room; the door closing behind them. The scene fades to black.

A few moments later, the scene fades back in. The cameraman is filming through the blinds of the contestants' shared bedroom. Mr. Bentley is seen screaming, though his voice inaudible, whilst smashing a bottle of Budweiser on the bedframe of Kesan. One unidentified contestant, cut from all official airings of the show due to political affiliations, is seen crying hysterically.
