= Tip Toe Wing in My Jawwdinz =

"Tip Toe Wing In My Jawwdinz"

Single by Riff Raff

from the album Neon Icon
- Released: June 10, 2014
- Recorded: 2013
- Genre: Hip hop
- Length: 4:04
- Label: Mad Decent
- Songwriters: Horst Simco; R. Story
- Producer: Top Secret Productions

Riff Raff singles chronology
"How to Be the Man" (2013)	"Tip Toe Wing In My Jawwdinz" (2014)	"Doctor Pepper" (2015)

"Tip Toe Wing In My Jawwdinz" is a song by American hip hop recording artist Riff Raff. It was released on June 10, 2014, as the second official single from his debut studio album Neon Icon (2014). The song was produced by Top Secret Productions. The song has since peaked at number 24 on the US Billboard Bubbling Under Hot 100 Singles chart.

== Music video ==
The music video for "Tip Toe Wing In My Jawwdinz" was uploaded to Riff Raff's YouTube channel on November 10, 2014. It was directed by Mickey Finnegan and Riff Raff.

== Freestyles ==
In September 2014, American rapper Ludacris released his freestyle of "Tip Toe Wing In My Jawwdinz".

== Chart performance ==
Chart (2014)	Peak position
US Bubbling Under Hot 100 (Billboard)	24
