= Aquaberry Aquarius =

Mixtape by Riff Raff
- Released: January 30, 2017
- Recorded: 2016–17
- Genres: Hip hop; trap
- Labels: Neon Nation Corporation, EMPIRE
- Producers: Riff Raff (exec.); DJ Afterthought

Riff Raff chronology
| Peach Panther (2016) | Aquaberry Aquarius (2017) | Cool Blue Jewels (2018) |

Aquaberry Aquarius is the nineteenth mixtape by American rapper Riff Raff. The album was released on January 30, 2017, by Neon Nation Corporation and BMG Rights Management with distribution handled by Warner Music.

== Track listing ==
All tracks produced by DJ Afterthought.

| No. | Title | Length |
|---|---|---|
| 1. | "Hit Me Up" (featuring Lisa Cimorelli) | 3:14 |
| 2. | "Test Drive" (featuring Wiz Khalifa) | 2:44 |
| 3. | "My Ice" | 3:28 |
| 4. | "Root Beer Float Ghost" (featuring Tomi Dibiase) | 3:40 |
| 5. | "Word Around Town" (featuring Choo Jackson) | 2:42 |
| 6. | "I’m Not Waiting on the Summer" | 3:34 |
| 7. | "Codeine Counselors" (featuring Fat Nick & Germ) | 2:31 |
| 8. | "Last Time I Checked" (featuring Bones) | 2:58 |
| 9. | "Jody Highroller Dot Com" (featuring Choo Jackson) | 4:22 |
