= King of the Avenue =

- Film poster
- Directed by: Ryan Combs
- Written by: Ryan Combs
- Produced by: Craig Chapman; Anne Clements; Frances Lausell; Chris Panizzon; Ving Rhames
- Starring: Ving Rhames; Simon Rex; Esai Morales
- Cinematography: Mario Signore
- Edited by: Alexander Egan; Mathys Willem
- Music by: Desi Desmond; Panauh Kalayeh; Carlos Nicasio; Rick St. Hilaire; William Warner
- Production companies: Ironhog Motion Pictures; Clear Entertainment; DRO Entertainment; Freedom Reign Productions; Odd Man Out Productions
- Distributed by: First Look Studios
- Release date: September 17, 2010
- Running time: 83 minutes
- Country: United States
- Language: English

King of the Avenue is a 2010 American-Canadian fantasy thriller drama film written and directed by Ryan Combs and starring Ving Rhames, Simon Rex and Esai Morales.

== Cast ==
- Simon Rex as Taz
- Ving Rhames as Norman Combs/De'Sha
- Esai Morales as Natas
- Erick Nathan as Cal
- Elizabeth Di Prinzio as Amanda
- Hemky Madera as Hector
- Eddie B. Smith as Scooter Pie
- Gillie Da Kid as Stanley

== Production ==
Filming occurred in Puerto Rico.
