= Neon Icon =

Studio album by Riff Raff
- Released: June 24, 2014
- Recorded: 2012–2014
- Genre: Hip hop
- Length: 47:28
- Label: Mad Decent/300
- Producers: Diplo; Atira; DJ Mustard; Deezus; DJA; Harry Fraud; Larry Fisherman; Mike Dez; Raf Riley; Top Secret Productions

Riff Raff chronology
¡Three Loco! (2012)	Neon Icon (2014)	Peach Panther (2016)

Singles from Neon Icon
- 1. "How to Be the Man" Released: November 26, 2013; 2. "Tip Toe Wing in My Jawwdinz" Released: June 10, 2014

Neon Icon is the debut studio album by American rapper Riff Raff. It was released on June 24, 2014, by Mad Decent. The album, which features Childish Gambino, Mac Miller, Paul Wall, Amber Coffman, Mike Posner, and Slim Thug, was produced by DJA, Larry Fisherman, DJ Mustard, Raf Riley, Harry Fraud, and executive producer Diplo. Neon Icon was supported by singles "How to Be the Man" and "Tip Toe Wing in My Jawwdinz".

== Background ==
Following the release of his mixtape Hologram Panda with a record producer Dame Grease, Riff Raff told MTV that his upcoming Mad Decent's studio album would be titled as Riff Raff, The Neon Icon, which shortens into Neon Icon. In August 2013, in an interview with XXL, Riff Raff explained the album's title saying, "It's like a whole new world that's just all me. From going from nothing to becoming this shining star...so I mean, yeah, Neon Icon is just neon everything. It can't be stopped." He also explained the album's diversity to XXL saying, "People think it's gonna be all pretty much just hip hop music, trap music, whatever. I'm gonna have some country songs on there, some rock songs and everything like that. And I'm fading more towards that way, so it's gonna put people in a position where they can't even compare me to nobody."

== Recording and production ==
On February 12, 2013, Riff Raff took to Twitter to reveal the collaborations with rappers such as Drake and A$AP Rocky, set to appear in his upcoming second studio album Neon Icon, uploading single photos to Instagram with both rappers respectively. On March 10, 2013, Riff Raff announced that the album would be feature Wiz Khalifa, Future, Mac Miller, YG and Snoop Dogg, among others. On the following year, he announced on his Twitter, as well as most of his multiple interviews with the other artists that would be appearing on his debut album; including Action Bronson, Asher Roth, Bun B, Childish Gambino, Fitz and the Tantrums, Juicy J, Mike Posner, Paul Wall, 2 Chainz and Skylar Grey, among others. It was also announced that his debut album would feature the production provided by Lex Luger, Larry Fisherman, DJ Mustard, TrapZillas and Skrillex; as well as Diplo, who is also executive producing the LP.

In November 2013, Riff Raff told Entertainment Weekly that he had recorded over 100 songs during the album's recording process. Following working with Clinton Sparks on his song "Stay With You Tonight", the two completed a song titled "A Spike Lee Joint" for Neon Icon. He also stated that Amber Coffman of Dirty Projectors would appear on the album. The final track listing revealed that the album would feature previously announced collaborations including Mac Miller, Childish Gambino, Paul Wall, Mike Posner and Amber Coffman, as well as Slim Thug. The track "Versace Python" was meant to feature a verse from Wiz Khalifa. However, Atlantic Records refused to clear the vocals in a timely manner, which resulted in it being cut from the album version, although the alternate version was released by the label in the weeks preceding the album's release.

== Release and promotion ==
On June 16, 2013, Riff Raff announced that Neon Icon would be released in September 2013. On August 12, 2013, he told The Source that the album would be released in mid-October 2013. However, during the 2013 MTV Video Music Awards he told XXL that the album would be released on September 24, 2013, the same day as Drake's Nothing Was the Same album. However, in September, Riff Raff implied that the album would be released in October 2013. On October 3, 2013, he announced on his Twitter account that the album would be released on January 28, 2014, one day before his 32nd birthday. However, on January 26, 2014, Riff Raff confirmed that the album had been pushed back to an unknown date and urged his fans to ask Diplo on Twitter when the album would be released. Then on February 24, 2014, Riff Raff announced that the album would be released during April 2014. A release date of April 29, 2014 was confirmed the following month. On April 28, 2014, Diplo tweeted that the album would be released during June 2014.

Starting on July 24, 2013, through September 2, 2013, Riff Raff toured North America on the Neon Icon Summer Tour. He would extend the tour from September 28 to October 26, 2013. He then followed that with the Birth of an Icon tour which continued through the end of 2013. In September 2013, he was featured on the cover of both the LA Weekly and Houston Press leading up to the album's release. He told Complex in August 2013 that he would shoot a music video for every song on the album. On October 30, 2013, Riff Raff teamed up with MySpace to release a commercial in promotion of the album as well as its next single "How to Be the Man"; a behind-the-scenes look at the filming of the commercial was also posted on Riff Raff's official MySpace page.

In November 2013, Riff Raff told Rolling Stone in an interview that leading up to the album's release he would release various "left-over" tracks from the album's recording sessions These notably included the Boi-1da-produced "Real Boyz", featuring rappers OJ da Juiceman and Cap 1, as well as "Suckas Askin' Questions" with Lil Debbie and "Shoulda Won a Grammy" with Action Bronson. In March 2014, prior to the album's release, Rolling Stone included the album on their list of "27 Must-Hear Albums of 2014". On May 20, 2014, Riff Raff announced through his Twitter that after much delay, Neon Icon was scheduled for a June 24, 2014 release date. On June 30, 2014, Riff Raff released the official remix to "2 Girls 1 Pipe" featuring Frankie Palmeri of Emmure. On August 20, 2015, Riff Raff released a remix of the song "Wetter Than Tsunami", featuring Danny Brown along with a music video.

== Singles ==
On June 25, 2013, he released a single titled "Dolce & Gabbana", produced by DJ Carnage as the first single from Neon Icon. However, two days later he announced that the song would not be included on the album. The music video for "Dolce & Gabbana" was released on September 17, 2013. On November 26, 2013, he released the first official single for Neon Icon titled "How To Be the Man" and produced by DJ Mustard. The music video for "How to Be the Man" was released on May 20, 2014. On June 5, 2014, the music video was released for "How to Be the Man" (Remix). On June 27, 2014, the music video was released for "Introducing the Icon". The album's second single "Tip Toe Wing in My Jawwdinz" was released on June 10, 2014.

== Critical reception ==
Professional ratings
Aggregate scores
Source	Rating
Metacritic	61/100
Review scores
Source	Rating
AllMusic	4/5 stars
Consequence of Sound	C+
HipHopDX	1/5 stars
Now	3/5 stars
Pitchfork	5.4/10
PopMatters	7/10
Rolling Stone	1/5 stars
Spin	8/10
XXL	3/5 (L)
Vibe	(positive)

Neon Icon was met with mixed reviews from music critics. On Metacritic, which assigns a normalized rating out of 100 to reviews from mainstream critics, the album received an average score of 61, based on 14 reviews, which indicates "generally favorable reviews". David Jeffries of AllMusic gave the album four out of five stars, saying "the ever-shifting music, the endless supply of quotables, and the wonderful mashing of indie beats, oddball lyrics, ICP theatrics, and stadium-party rap hooks beats up on the "talentless" argument hard." Jon Caramanica of The New York Times said, "At his best, he's a master of psychedelic free association, with non sequitur lyrics full of 10-point words that are rapped as if he had come up with the idea for the line just after it began, then rushed to finish it on beat [...] Indeed, Neon Icon is a fine hip-hop album from someone who seemed as if he'd make anything but. It's dispiriting to hear Riff Raff contort himself into the shape of a mediocre pop-rap song like “Maybe You Love Me” or to be scraped clean of all his idiosyncrasy on “Time,” an otherwise amusing country-rap tune." Adam Narkiewicz of The Quietus stated, "RiFF RaFF is a one off, and Neon Icon is that rare product of a rapper in the modern world – an album that perfectly encompasses everything they became loved for on their come up, amplified to the glorious maximum, aiming confidently into the future."

Lizzie Plaugic of CMJ said, "What prevents Neon Icon from completely imploding under the weight of its own surreality is the fact that, when he wants to, Riff Raff really can rap, and he has a way of making words do what he wants. [...] Neon Icon is the weight the internet has left us with. It's a much-delayed product of Tumblr art, Big Brother reality TV, corporate worship and urban fetishism. Or, maybe it's pushing against these things. I dunno, whatever, at least it's pretty fun." Jordan Sowumi writing for Now said, "His freestyle flow, along with a propensity for hooks that occasionally exude longing and pathos, have always been Riff Raff's biggest strengths, and they turn up here, too, especially on poignant "Versace Python" and riotously funny 'Tip Toe Wing in My Jawwdinz'." Pat Levy of Consequence of Sound stated, "While Neon Icon likely won't be the push that RiFF needs into the public consciousness, it certainly won't hurt his reputation." Austin Reed of Pretty Much Amazing said, "I spent an embarrassing amount of time laugh-dancing throughout the runs I made through Neon Icon. Like I was possessed by the Dustin Diamond of demonic entities. This album gets a C+ because I really enjoyed the time I spent hating it."

David Drake of Pitchfork wrote, "irony and irreverence can only do so much lifting on a record this thin. Neon Icon is hardly an affront to hip-hop's very foundation; instead, it's an adequate, listenable rap album, and for a part-time rapper/full-time jaw-dropper, there couldn't be a more damning outcome." Jesse Fairfax of HipHopDX stated, "Neon Icon seems aimless and not very well thought out. There are occasional hilarious moments; he throws pesos at strippers and refers to himself as “The White Wesley Snipes.” Riff ratchets up the oddity factor and gets creativity points for rhyming over Mac Miller's sparse piano keys and the sound of a skittering dolphin (“Aquaberry Dolphin”). But on face value, Neon Icon is neither entertaining as sheer parody, nor a passable attempt at making a sincere Hip Hop album when judged by its merits." Justin Block of XXL said, "The final Neon Icon product is merely 15 songs picked in the hope of just one catching some crossover play. There are many opportunities on this album for that. But on the whole, it's completely incohesive and difficult to listen to. In some ways, Neon Icon is a sunk cost album after delays and the sheer amount of material recorded. It pans out as—at the very least—a unique and varied production that asks to be received seriously, even if Riff Raff's choppy, uneasy flow and absurdist imagery runs counter to that."

== Commercial performance ==
The album debuted at number 22 on the Billboard 200, with first-week sales of 11,524 copies in the United States.

== Track listing ==
Standard edition
No.	Title	Writer(s)	Producer(s)	Length
1.	"Introducing the Icon"	Horst Simco; B. Down	Deezus	4:06
2.	"Kokayne"	Simco; Thomas Pentz	Diplo	3:02
3.	"Wetter Than Tsunami"	Simco; Rafael Greifer	Raf Riley	3:16
4.	"Jody 3 Moons" (Skit)	Simco; Derek Allen	DJA	1:26
5.	"Versace Python"	Simco; Pentz; Barrett Jines	Atira; Diplo	3:03
6.	"Lava Glaciers" (featuring Childish Gambino)	Simco; Rory Quigley; Donald Glover	Harry Fraud	3:52
7.	"Tip Toe Wing in My Jawwdinz"	Simco; R. Story	Top Secret Productions	4:04
8.	"Maybe You Love Me" (featuring Mike Posner)	Simco; Michael Posner; Allen	DJA	2:57
9.	"Aquaberry Dolphin" (featuring Mac Miller)	Simco; Malcolm McCormick	Larry Fisherman	2:14
10.	"The Bloomingdales at Windshire Palace" (Skit)	Simco		1:40
11.	"Time"	Simco; Allen	DJA	3:39
12.	"How to Be the Man"	Simco; Dijon McFarlane	DJ Mustard	2:53
13.	"Cool It Down" (featuring Amber Coffman)	Simco; Pentz; Michael Abundes; Amber Coffman	Diplo; Mike Dez	2:55
14.	"VIP Pass to My Heart"	Simco; Allen	DJA	3:33
15.	"How to Be the Man" (Houston Remix) (featuring Slim Thug and Paul Wall)	Simco; McFarlane; Stayve Thomas; Paul Slayton	DJ Mustard	4:18

Vinyl bonus track
No.	Title	Writer(s)	Length
16.	"Stupid Girl"	Simco	3:51

Pre-order bonus tracks
No.	Title	Writer(s)	Producer(s)	Length
16.	"2 Girls One Pipe"	Simco; Allen	DJA	2:18
17.	"Tropical Vacation"	Simco	Beau Billionaire; Anna Yvette	3:43

== Personnel ==
Credits for Neon Icon adapted from AllMusic.

- Childish Gambino – featured artist
- Amber Coffman – featured artist
- Anna Yvette – producer
- Atira – producer
- Beau Billionaire – producer
- Mike Dez – producer
- Deezus – producer
- Diplo – producer
- DJ Mustard – producer
- DJA – producer
- Harry Fraud – producer
- Jaime "Jimmy Cash" Lepe – mastering, mixing
- Van Jazmin – cover image and booklet art
- Mac Miller – featured artist, producer
- Mike Posner – featured artist
- RiFF RAFF – primary artist
- Raf Riley – producer
- Slim Thug – featured artist
- Top Secret – producer
- Paul Wall – featured artist

== Charts ==
Chart (2014)	Peak position
US Billboard 200	22
US Top R&B/Hip-Hop Albums (Billboard)	6
