= Three Loco =

American hip hop group

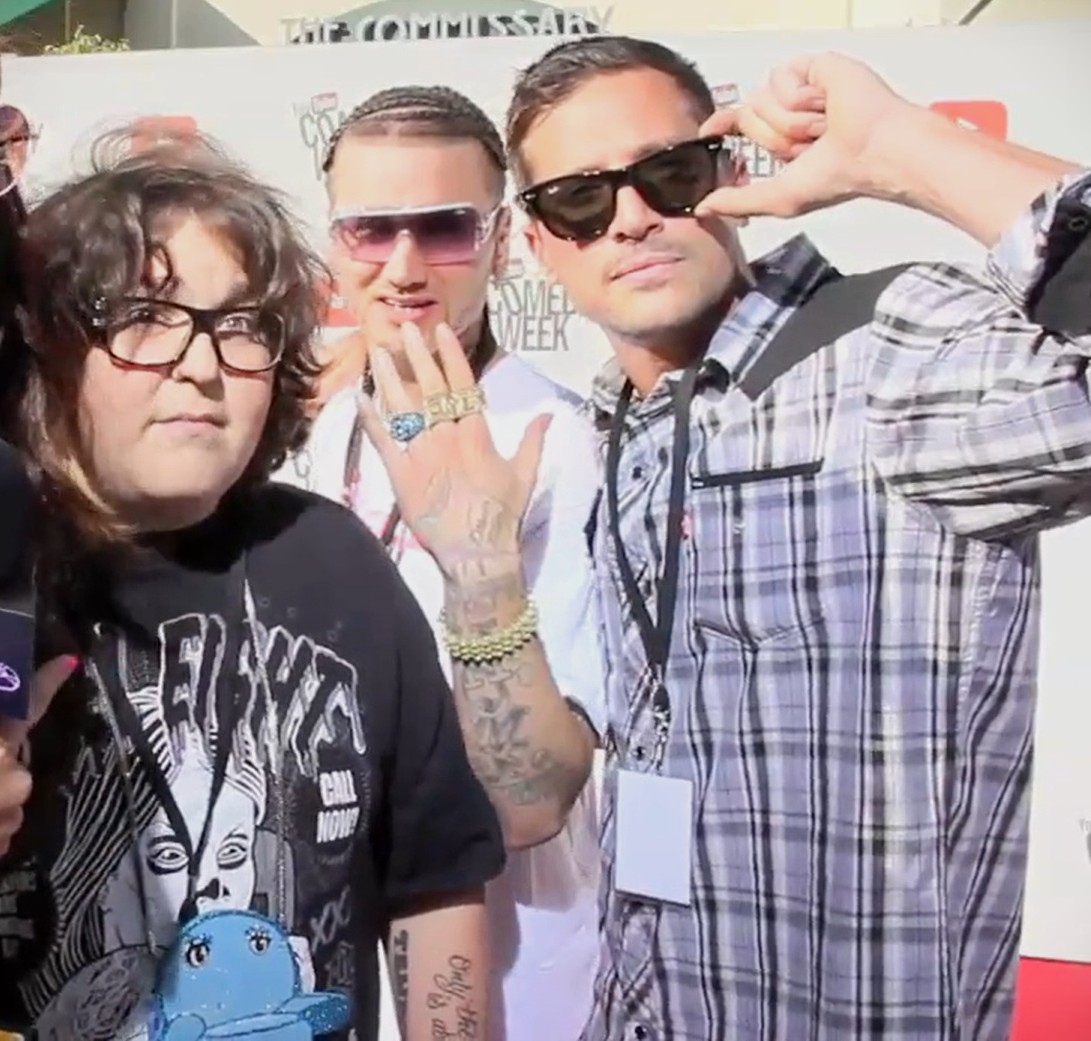
- Three Loco in 2013; left to right: Andy Milonakis, Jody Christian (Riff Raff); Simon Rex (Dirt Nasty)

Background information
- Origin: Los Angeles, California, U.S.
- Genre: Comedy hip hop
- Years active: 2011–2014; 2016; 2020
- Label: Mad Decent
- Members: Andy Milonakis; Dirt Nasty; Riff Raff

Three Loco (stylized as ¡Three Loco!) is an American comedy hip hop group composed of Andy Milonakis, Dirt Nasty, and Riff Raff. The trio has proclaimed themselves as the "Holy Trinity of hip-hop".

== History ==
Andy Milonakis, Dirt Nasty, and Riff Raff are alumni of the American cable network MTV. Andy Milonakis had a sketch comedy show on MTV titled The Andy Milonakis Show from 2005 to 2007. Dirt Nasty was a video jockey (VJ) on MTV during the mid-1990s. Riff Raff was a contestant on the second season of the MTV reality show From G's to Gents, before being booted out during the second episode. In an e-mail interview with Earmilk, both Andy Milonakis and Riff Raff expressed hope for a television series and a feature film in the future featuring the Three Loco trio. On September 26, 2014, Andy Milonakis confirmed via Twitter that the group had broken up.

The trio reunited in 2020 for the track "Arrogant American Freestyle."

== Album release ==
Their debut album ¡Three Loco! was released by Mad Decent on November 27, 2012. A three-song sampler has been released by Mad Decent imprint Jeffree's on August 14, 2012, as a teaser for the album. The sampler includes the songs: "We Are Farmers" (feat. Diplo) (prod. Derek "DJA" Allen), "NEATO" (prod. Nik Nikateen), "Jump Rope" (feat. Porcelain Black) (prod. Rich Skillz) The album is slated to feature both hip-hop and electro house beats, with further guest vocals provided by Diplo.

The song "We Are Farmers", originally released in January 2012, samples the Farmers Insurance Group jingle. However, the reworked version of the song was officially released on August 13, 2012, and features a guest rap from Diplo, marking Diplo's official rap debut. The accompanying music video was directed by longtime Dirt Nasty friend and collaborator Nicholaus Goossen. The music video was removed from YouTube after the group received a cease and desist letter from Farmers Insurance Group.

The song "Jump Rope" was released on April 13, 2012, and features guest vocals by industrial pop singer Porcelain Black. According to an e-mail interview with Earmilk, Andy Milonakis stated that the song samples a song by Shelley Duvall from the 1980 film Popeye.

The song "NEATO" was officially released on May 18, 2012. The song makes references to Cheetos, Steven Seagal, Fritos, Lilo & Stitch(Lilo refers to Lindsay Lohan), Rihanna, Tim Tebow, Totino's, Waka Flocka Flame, etc. The accompanying music video, directed by Canadian film director Mike Clattenburg, pays tribute to the cult 1994 film Pulp Fiction and features a cameo by Jordan Capozzi (Lil Debbie) from the former hip hop group White Girl Mob.

On November 12, 2012, after reportedly six months of delays on the part of their label, Andy Milonakis released another single off of their EP called "Bong Hits."

== Critical reception ==
Hypetrak's Richard Brooks refers to Three Loco as "hip-hop's Three Musketeers". Indie label Discobelle Records describes Three Loco as the "twisted musical equivalent" of Chevy Chase, Martin Short, and Steve Martin in the 1986 film Three Amigos.

== ¡Three Loco! EP ==
¡Three Loco!

EP by Three Loco
- Released: November 27, 2012
- Recorded: 2012
- Genre: Comedy hip hop
- Label: Mad Decent
- Producers: Nik Nikateen; Sinden; 5kinandbone5; Diplo; So Shifty; IDAP; Dirt Nasty; DJA

Singles from ¡Three Loco!
- 1. "Neato" Released: May 18, 2012; 2. "We Are Farmers" Released: October 18, 2012; 3. "Bong Hits" Released: November 27, 2012; 4. "Beer" Released: February 14, 2013

¡Three Loco! is the debut EP. The tracks "We Are Farmers" and "Jump Rope" featuring Porcelain Black were originally meant for the EP but were scrapped due to legal issues with the samples.

=== Track listing ===
No.	Title	Producer	Length
1.	"Neato"	Nik Nikateen	2:55
2.	"Bills Are Paid"	Sinden; 5kinandbone5	3:28
3.	"Bong Hits"	Sinden; 5kinandbone5	3:06
4.	"Not Coming Home Tonight"	Diplo; So Shifty	3:35
5.	"Beer"	IDAP	3:19
6.	"Paranoid"	Dirt Nasty	3:31
7.	"We Are Llamas" (featuring Diplo)	DJA	3:52
8.	"Make 'Em Wait"	IDAP	3:12
