= The Andy Milonakis Show =

American television series

- Created by: Andy Milonakis; Jimmy Kimmel
- Starring: Andy Milonakis
- Country of origin: United States
- Original language: English
- No. of seasons: 3
- No. of episodes: 22

Production
- Running time: 22 minutes
- Production companies: Jackhole Industries; MTV Production Development; MTV2 Series Development (2006–2007) (seasons 2–3)

Original release
- Network: MTV; (2005); MTV2; (2006–2007)
- Release: June 26, 2005 – May 1, 2007

The Andy Milonakis Show is an American sketch comedy television show starring Andy Milonakis, which aired on MTV (season 1) and MTV2 (seasons 2-3). The program premiered on June 26, 2005 and ended with its three-season run when it was cancelled on May 1, 2007.

== Format ==
The show features Milonakis and a supporting cast of his actual neighbors and people from the Lower East Side, Manhattan neighborhood. There is no plot, and the sketches tend to be absurdist and silly. The content is rated TV-PG. There are often animated segments, and man-on-the-street segments. The final sketch usually involves a celebrity guest. In the third and final season, Milonakis moved to Los Angeles to be with his now famous pet turtle, Herbie. His best friend, Ralphie, sneaks along and moves with him and made their old friends into household items to bring along.

== Episodes ==
=== Season 1 ===
Episode number	Original air date	Guest star(s)
1.1	June 26, 2005	Lil Jon & the East Side Boyz, Biz Markie
1.2	July 3, 2005	Snoop Dogg, Vanessa Lachey
1.3	July 10, 2005	John Stamos
1.4	July 17, 2005	Black Eyed Peas
1.5	July 24, 2005	Ying Yang Twins
1.6	July 31, 2005	Fat Joe
1.7	August 7, 2005	Carson Daly
1.8	August 14, 2005	Rob Schneider

=== Season 2 ===
Episode number	Original air date	Guest star(s)
2.1	March 31, 2006	Paul Wall
2.2	April 7, 2006	Juelz Santana
2.3	April 14, 2006	Nick Cannon
2.4	April 21, 2006	The All-American Rejects
2.5	April 28, 2006	Mike Jones
2.6	May 4, 2006	Seth Green
2.7	May 11, 2006	Jimmy Kimmel
2.8	May 18, 2006	Shaun White

=== Season 3 ===
Episode number	Episode title	Original air date	Guest star(s)
3.1	"Andy Moves to L.A."	March 27, 2007	Hilary Duff
3.2	"Andy Is Annoying"	April 3, 2007	Sarah Silverman
3.3	"Andy Goes Camping"	April 10, 2007	Three 6 Mafia
3.4	"Andy and Ralphie Are Dumb"	April 17, 2007	Akon
3.5	"Andy's Soap Opera"	April 24, 2007	Paul Reubens
3.6	"Andy's Season Finale Extravaganza"	May 1, 2007	Bow Wow
