= Andy Milonakis =

American comedian

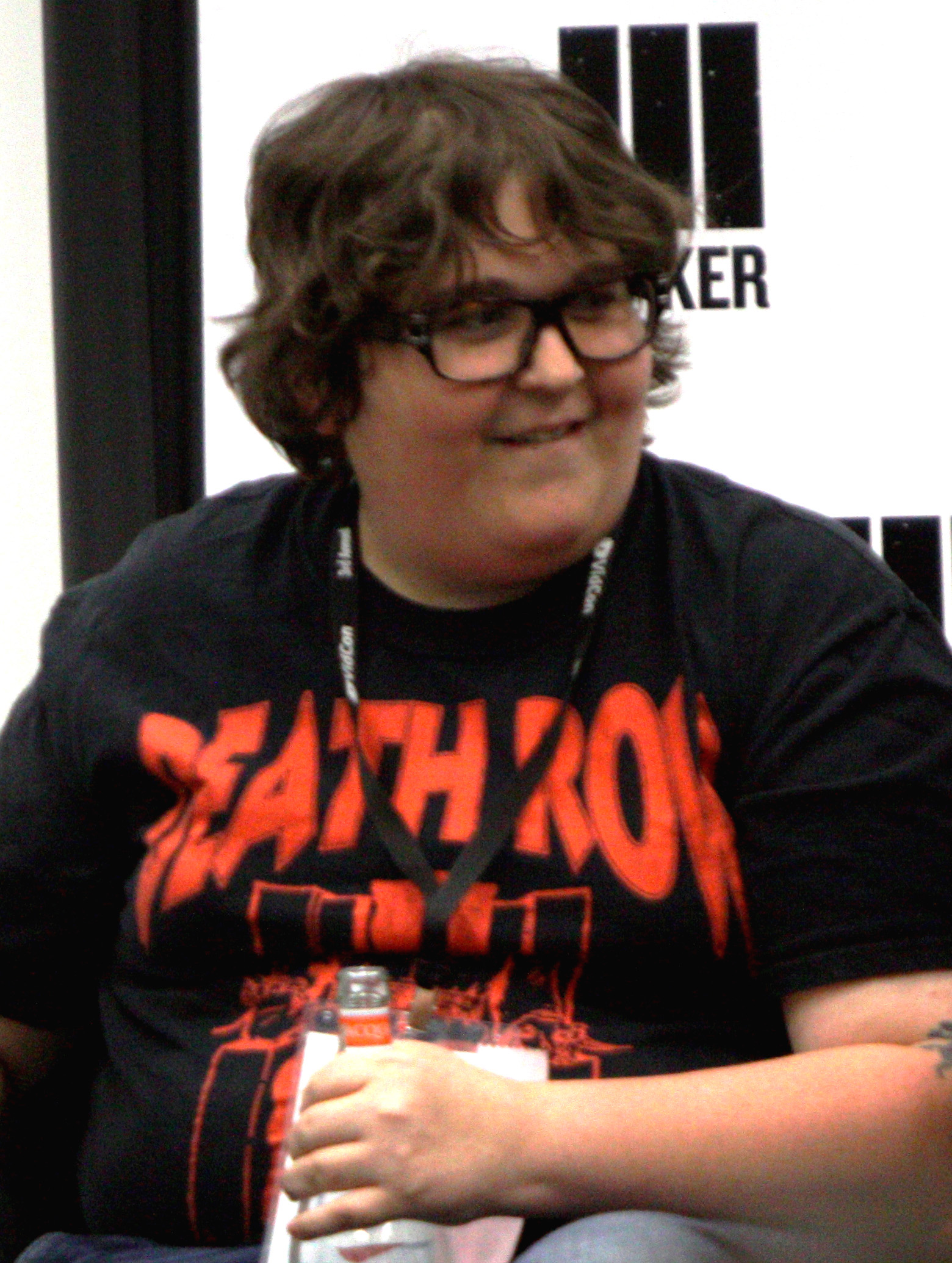
- Milonakis at the 2012 VidCon
- Born: Andrew Michael Milonakis; January 30, 1976 (age 50); Katonah, New York, U.S.
- Occupations: Comedian; actor; rapper; internet personality
- Years active: 2003–present

YouTube information
- Channel: Andy Milonakis
- Years active: 2006–present
- Subscribers: 543,000
- Views: 108 million
- Last updated: October 4, 2026

Andrew Michael Milonakis (/mɪləˈnɑːkɪs/; born January 30, 1976) is an American comedian, actor, rapper, and internet personality. He is best known for his work on The Andy Milonakis Show, a sketch comedy series that aired on MTV and MTV2 from 2005 to 2007. Other notable films and TV series in which Milonakis has appeared include Kroll Show, Waiting..., and Adventure Time.

== Early life ==
Milonakis was born in Katonah, New York, to a Greek-American family. His father was born in Greece. Milonakis was born with a growth hormone deficiency, causing him to have the appearance and voice of an adolescent. He attended John Jay High School in Lewisboro. Milonakis turned to comedy and humor as a preemptive defense mechanism.

== Career ==
On January 26, 2003, the day of Super Bowl XXXVII, Milonakis decided not to attend a friend's Super Bowl party and instead recorded a video titled "The Super Bowl Is Gay". He posted the video to the website AngryNakedPat.com, and within two weeks it went viral. A writer for ABC's new late-night show, Jimmy Kimmel Live!, spotted it and got Milonakis on the program. At the time, Milonakis was working in tech support at a Manhattan accounting firm.

Over the next few years, Milonakis would continue to make guest appearances on Kimmel's show. The talk show host eventually sent a DVD of Milonakis's clips to MTV2 executive producer Tony DiSanto, proposing what would eventually become The Andy Milonakis Show. MTV greenlit the pilot in 2005: an "absurdist, surrealist nightmare that used random people as actors," combining sketches and man-on-the-street segments with celebrity guest appearances. It would run for three seasons.

Milonakis first started rapping on YouTube; his first song was called "The Andy Milonakis Rap". He was in Three Loco, a group that also included rap artists Dirt Nasty and Riff Raff, but on September 26, 2014, he announced that the group had broken up.

From 2014 to 2015, Milonakis hosted and starred in a cooking show called Fat Prince on Munchies, a YouTube channel that is part of the Vice network. In each episode, he and a changing cast of chefs combined cheap ingredients with expensive ingredients to make a unique meal.

Milonakis is known for his Twitch livestreams.Throughout 2017 and 2018, Milonakis was heavily involved with livestreamer Paul Denino, better known as Ice Poseidon, appearing in his livestreams and associating with his CX Network.

In 2022, Milonakis partnered with Voiceverse, a blockchain-based startup that marketed itself as offering AI voice cloning technology in the form of non-fungible tokens.

== Personal life ==
After having lived in Los Angeles, California for much of his career, in September 2021, Milonakis moved to Astoria, Queens, New York City. In January 2025, Milonakis moved to Austin, Texas.

== Discography ==
=== EPs ===
- Gazpacho (2010)

=== Collaborations ===
- Busboys' Paradise (with Max Kasch and Dean Shull) (2005)
- ¡Three Loco! (with Riff Raff and Dirt Nasty as Three Loco) (2012)

=== Mixtapes ===
- Hot Soup (2009)

=== Singles ===
==== As lead artist ====
List of singles, showing year released and album name
Title	Year	Album
"Let Me Twitter Dat"	2009	Non-album single
"Lemonade Bubble Gum"	2010	Non-album single
"Red Lean Purple Lean"	2011	Non-album single
"Spaghetti (Aka Party With Your Pussy Out)" (featuring Chippy Nonstop)	2011	Non-album single
"Worst Day" (featuring Jimmy Donn and Grewsum)	2013	Non-album single
"Tokyo Trap House"	2015	Non-album single

==== As featured artist ====
List of singles as featured performer, showing year released and album name
Title	Year	Album
"The Birds & The Bees" (Chain Swangaz featuring Andy Milonakis)	2011	Non-album single
"The Takeover" (Diwon featuring Y-Love, Tj Di Hitmaker and Andy Milonakis)	2013	Non-album single
"Birthday" (Hands of Tyme featuring Andy Milonakis)	2014	Non-album single

=== Guest appearances ===
List of non-single guest appearances, with other performing artists, showing year released and album name
Title	Year	Other artist(s)	Album
"Hoes on My Dick"	2010	Lil B	—N/a
"Money and Swag"	2012	JBAR	#TOKE Vol. 1
"Pocket Like It's Hot"	2012	Snoop Dogg	—N/a
"Worst Day"	2013	Dopesic	Nothing Matters
"Twisted"	2013	Dirt Nasty, Riff Raff	Palatial
"Morphine Popsicles"	2013	Dirt Nasty, Riff Raff	—N/a
"Money on My Mind"	2013	Dirt Nasty, Riff Raff, V-Nasty	—N/a
"HIROI SEKAI (Worldwide)"	2014	KOHH, J $tash	—N/a
"Nice Rims"	2014	Dirt Nasty, Riff Raff	—N/a
"Pizza Boi"	2014	Slippery	—N/a
"Hot Shit"	2015	Chief Keef	Sorry 4 the Weight
"G.L.O.G.A.N.G."	2015	Chief Keef	—N/a
"No Hook Gang"	2015	Chief Keef	—N/a
"My House"	2015	Chief Keef	—N/a
"Right Now"	2017	Gucci Mane, Chief Keef	Views From Zone 6 and Dinner

== Filmography ==
=== Film ===
Year	Title	Role	Notes
2005	Waiting...	Nick	
2007	Who's Your Caddy?	Wilson Cummings	
2008	Killer Pad	Dinko's Geek	
2008	Wieners	Drake Hanswald / Timmy O'Shaemus	
2008	Major Movie Star	Joe Kidd	
2008	Extreme Movie	Justin	
2009	2 Dudes and a Dream	Ned	
2009	Still Waiting...	Nick	
2009	The Tales of RJ	Miles	Short film
2012	Mac & Devin Go to High School	Knees Down	
2012	The Newest Pledge		
2014	Dumbbells	Tiny	
2016	Halloweed	Spanky	
2018	Bodied	Freddie Hustle	
2021	King Knight	Percival	
2022	Funny Pages	George	
2023	The Sweet East	Jeff	

=== Television ===
Year	Title	Role	Notes
2005–2007	The Andy Milonakis Show	Himself	22 episodes
2005	Total Request Live		1 episode
2006	Nick Cannon Presents: Wild 'N Out		1 episode
2007	Crank Yankers		2 episodes
2007	Celebrity Deathmatch	Himself	Episode: Vaughn vs. Wilson; Archive footage
2009	truTV Presents: World's Dumbest...	Commentator	1 episode
2010–2018	Adventure Time	N.E.P.T.R., additional voices	Voice, 18 episodes
2011	Snoop Dogg's Double G News Network	Android Miller	10 episodes
2013	Kroll Show	Roman Armond	8 episodes
2013	Watsky's Releasing an Album	Himself	2 episodes
2014	The Adventures of Velvet Prozak	Zack	Main role; Episode: "Pilot"
2016–2018	Future-Worm!	Danny Douglas	Voice, main role
2017	Billy Dilley's Super-Duper Subterranean Summer	Jared	Voice, episode: "Jared"
2022	The Guardians of Justice	Phil Hart	Recurring role
2025	Adventure Time: Fionna and Cake	NEPTR, Vampire #2	Voice, episode: "The Bear and the Rose"
