= Simon Rex =

American actor (born 1974)

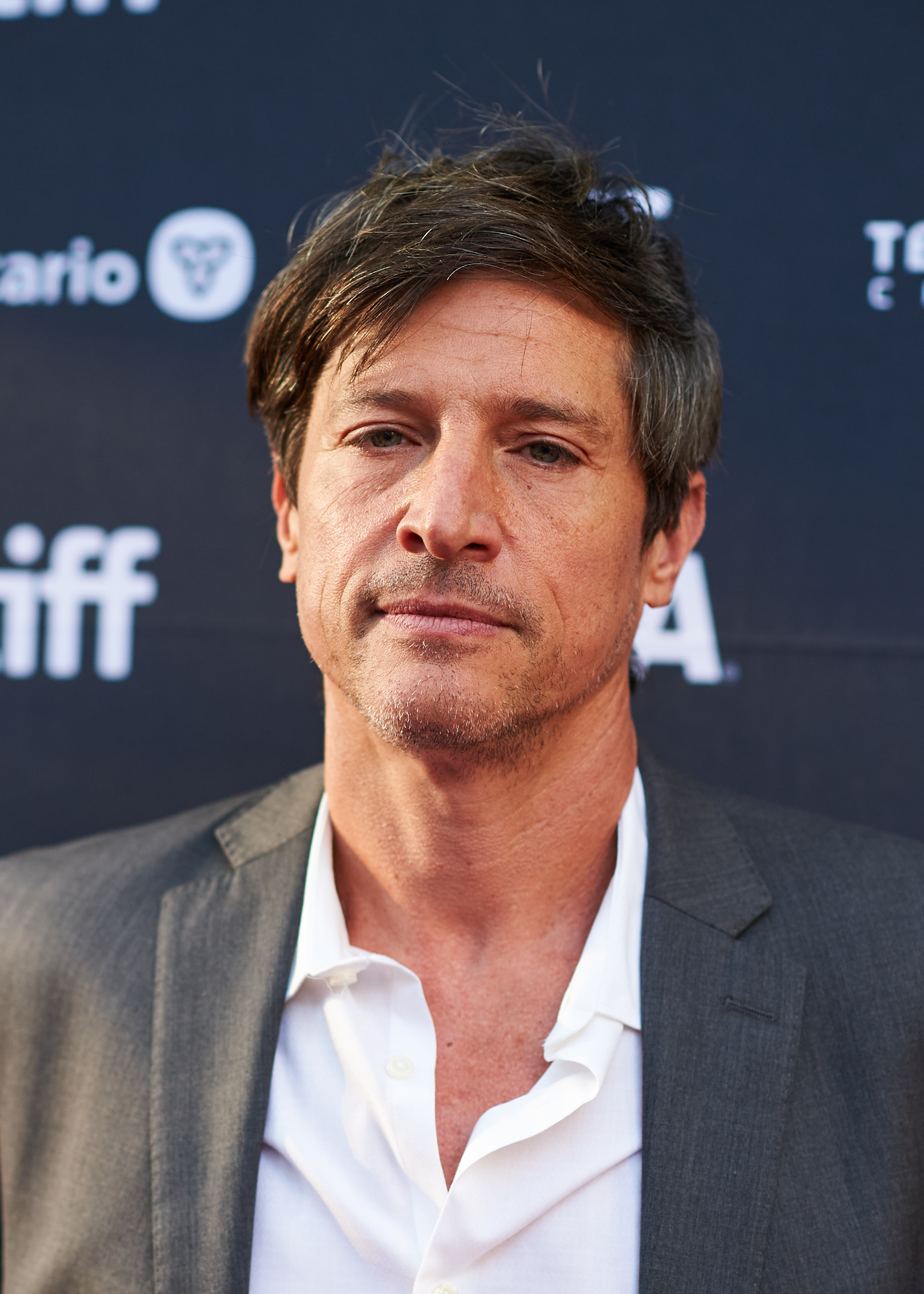
- Rex in 2025
- Born: Simon Rex Cutright; July 20, 1974 (age 52); San Francisco, California, U.S.
- Other names: Dirt Nasty; Sebastian
- Occupations: Actor; rapper; record; comedian; producer; model
- Years active: 1995–present
- Musical career
- Genre: Hip-hop
- Years active: 2005–present
- Labels: RED; Shoot To Kill; E1; RBC; MySpace
- Website: dirtnastymusic.com

Simon Rex Cutright (born July 20, 1974) is an American actor and rapper. Rising to fame as an MTV VJ, Rex later became an actor known for What I Like About You, starring in three films of the Scary Movie franchise, and National Lampoon's Pledge This! (2006). He later developed a rap persona, Dirt Nasty, and had several solo albums and co-founded the hip-hop group Three Loco. In 2021, he received critical acclaim for his lead role in Sean Baker's drama film Red Rocket, winning the Independent Spirit Award for Best Male Lead.

== Early life ==
Simon Rex Cutright was born on July 20, 1974, in San Francisco, California, and raised in Alameda, the son of Zoe, an environmental consultant, and Paul, a relationship coach. His mother is Jewish and he has identified as Jewish.

Rex was an only child who grew up in the San Francisco Bay Area. Rex's father was a breath-work coach (in the tradition of alternative psychologist Stanislav Grof) who left the family when Rex was little. At age 18, he was attending community college and working at a potato-sack factory when he began dating and living with a model in Oakland.

== Career ==
=== Early work in porn and on MTV (1993–1998) ===
In 1993, aged 19, Rex responded to an advertisement in a Los Angeles magazine and agreed to be photographed nude for photographer Brad Posey and his Club 1821 studio. The following year, under the alias "Sebastian", he appeared in solo masturbation scenes for three gay Club 1821 pornographic films: Young, Hard & Solo #2, Young, Hard & Solo #3, and Hot Sessions III. Archive footage of Rex was also used in the 2000 films Hot Sessions 11 and Hot Sessions 12.

A casting director spotted him and the next day he flew to Milan to work as a model. In 1994, Rex went on a modeling tour for Tommy Hilfiger, before going on to appear in mainstream modeling gigs for Calvin Klein Inc, Versace, and Levi's.

In 1995, MTV hired Rex to work as a VJ and kept him on the air for over two years before he and two other VJs were let go.

=== Television and film (1999–2017) ===
In 1999, he was cast in the comedy-drama television series Jack & Jill, which aired on The WB channel for two seasons. He appeared as Eli in the TV show Felicity and television guest appearances followed including Baywatch, Everwood, and Summerland.

Starting in 2002, Rex starred with Amanda Bynes in the sitcom What I Like About You. In 2006, he appeared on the Lifetime primetime telenovela Monarch Cove, which ran for fourteen episodes. From television into film, Rex has held the lead role in feature films including Scary Movie 3, 4, & 5, Hotel California, The Karate Dog, King of the Avenue, and Superhero Movie. Rex more recently starred alongside comedian Nick Swardson in the Comedy Central show, Typical Rick, which ran for two seasons from 2016 to 2017.

=== Music (2005–2020) ===
Rex entered the music industry in 2005 as a rap artist after becoming friends with and discovering Mickey Avalon. Rex adopted his alter ego Dirt Nasty and formed the rap group Dyslexic Speedreaders with Avalon & Andre Legacy. Rex both produced and was featured on the group's hit song "My Dick". Again the group paired with Lil Jon to create the song "What Do You Say" which was featured in 2009's blockbuster comedy film, The Hangover.

Rex was an investor in the New York City nightclub The Plumm with partners Noel Ashman, Samantha Ronson, Chris Noth, and others. It opened in 2006 and closed in 2009.

In 2007, Dirt Nasty released his self-titled debut album, which included the songs 1980, Cracker Ass Fantastic, and Droppin' Names. His second album, 2011's Nasty as I Wanna Be, featured Kesha, LMFAO, Too Short, and Warren G. Rex's other musical projects under his Dirt Nasty alias include his third album Palatial, and the supergroup Three Loco which features Andy Milonakis and Riff Raff. As Three Loco, the group teamed up with producer Diplo and released the group's eight-song EP on Diplo's Mad Decent label. Dirt Nasty appeared in Season 1, episode 5 of Paris Hilton's My New BFF where the girls had to play "Seven Minutes in Heaven" with him.

=== Film resurgence (2021–present) ===
In 2020, Rex, stuck in a floundering music endeavor with film opportunities having dried up, received a call from director Sean Baker asking him to send in a video audition for the film Red Rocket, after which he was quickly offered the lead role. Rex stated: "Sean Baker gave me a shot when nobody else would ... I didn't really work for over a decade. And I think Sean wanted to prove to people that he could show someone like me could do it." The film premiered in competition for the Palme d'Or at the 2021 Cannes Film Festival and the film – and particularly Rex's performance – received overwhelmingly positive reviews. The film was considered a serious acting career breakthrough for Rex and his comeback in the industry.

In October 2021, as a result of the attention Red Rocket had garnered, Rex signed with the management firm Range Media Partners. He next appeared in Mack & Rita, starring Diane Keaton, followed by Down Low with Zachary Quinto. Soon after that, he was cast in a number of other films that premiered in film festivals, such as Americana and The Sweet East. Other film appearances include Greedy People, Blink Twice, and Everything's Going to Be Great. He was cast in a supporting role in The Leader, a biopic about the Heaven's Gate cult led by Marshall Applewhite.

Rex appeared in the April 2, 2022, episode of Saturday Night Live hosted by Jerrod Carmichael with musical guest Gunna, in the music video "Short-Ass Movies", where in addition to appearing as himself, his face is used for Ernest P. Worrell.

=== Other activities ===
In late 2023, Rex co-founded a re-launched men's skincare brand out of Colorado known as MOX. As the face of the brand, he regularly promotes MOX products on his social media and during interviews.

== Personal life ==
In his late 40s, Rex reconnected with his father. They shared a "psychedelic experience" during which Rex learned his grandfather was a "spiritual leader" who was "not always the most faithful member of his flock."

Rex bought a house in Laurel Canyon after the success of Scary Movie 3. He was living in a guesthouse in the Venice neighborhood of Los Angeles when he was offered US$70,000 by British tabloids to falsely claim he had dated Meghan Markle, his co-star in Cuts.

Tabloids speculated that he had dated Paris Hilton, but he insisted they were just "friends that held hands."

Rex lives off the grid in Joshua Tree, California, a town on the edge of the Mojave Desert.

== Filmography ==
Key
†	Denotes productions that have not yet been released

=== Film ===
Year	Title	Role	Notes
1994	Young, Hard & Solo #2	Sebastian	Direct-to-video
1994	Young, Hard & Solo #3	Sebastian	Direct-to-video
1994	Hot Sessions #3	Sebastian	Direct-to-video
2000	Hot Sessions #11	Sebastian	Archive footage; direct-to-video
2000	Hot Sessions #12	Sebastian	Archive footage; direct-to-video
2000	Shriek If You Know What I Did Last Friday the 13th	Slab O'Beef	
2001	Going Greek	Thompson	
2001	The Forsaken	Pen	
2003	Scary Movie 3	George Logan	
2006	Scary Movie 4	George Logan	Cameo
2006	National Lampoon's Pledge This!	Derek	
2007	Rise: Blood Hunter	Hank	
2008	Superhero Movie	Human Torch	
2008	Hotel California	Pete	
2010	King of the Avenue	Taz	
2012	Slightly Single in L.A.	J.P. Cipoletti	
2013	Scary Movie 5	Dan Sanders	
2017	Alexander IRL	Owen Reed	
2017	Bodied	Donnie Narco	
2018	Avengers of Justice: Farce Wars	Dark Jokester	
2021	Red Rocket	Mikey Saber	
2022	Mack & Rita	Luca	
2022	My Dead Dad	Gavin	
2023	Down Low	Buck/Fleshpuppet	
2023	Americana	Roy Lee Dean	
2023	The Sweet East	Lawrence	
2024	Blink Twice	Cody	
2024	Greedy People	Keith	
2024	Operation Taco Gary's	Danny	
2025	Magic Farm	Dave	
2025	Tow	Cliff	
2025	Everything's Going to Be Great	Kyle	
2025	Easy's Waltz	Sam	
2026	The Leader	David	
TBA	The Prince †		Post-production
TBA	Halloween Store †	Wes Gulager	Post-production
TBA	God Bless You, Mr. Kopu †	Marco Cass	Filming

=== Television ===
Year	Title	Role	Notes
1996	Baywatch	Himself	Episode: "Beachblast"
1999	Felicity	Eli	4 episodes
1999	Katie Joplin	Tiger French	Main role; 5 episodes
1999–2001	Jack & Jill	Michael "Mikey" Russo	Main role; 32 episodes
2002–2003	What I Like About You	Jeff Campbell	Main role (season 1); 21 episodes
2004	The Karate Dog	Det. Peter Fowler	Television film
2004–2005	Summerland	Sun	2 episodes
2005	Cuts	Harrison	2 episodes
2005	Everwood	Cliff Fenton	Episode: "So Long, Farewell..."
2006	Monarch Cove	Eddie Lucas	Main role; 14 episodes
2010	Nick Swardson's Pretend Time	Brian	Episode: "I Just Got Voodoo'd"
2014	Happyland	Tony	Episode: "Park Maintenance"
2015	Perception	Roy Meier	Episode: "Meat"
2015	NCIS	Scott Bleeker	Episode: "Status Update"
2016–2017	Typical Rick	Rick	12 episodes
2020	The Real Bros of Simi Valley	DJ Womp Womp	Episode: "Lights Out Gringos"
2022	Saturday Night Live	Himself/Dirt Nasty	Episode: "Jerrod Carmichael/Gunna"
2023	Bupkis	Ben/Crispy	Episode: "Crispytown"
2024	It's Florida, Man	Eric Merda	Episode: "Gator"
2025	Mo	Guy	3 episodes
2025	Poker Face	'Rocket' Russ Waddell	Episode: "Hometown Hero"

=== Music videos ===
Year	Title	Artist	Role
2004	"She Wants to Move"	N.E.R.D	Hot guy
2009	"Tik Tok"	Kesha	Barry
2010	"Yes"	LMFAO	Dirt Nasty
2011	"Sexy and I Know It"	LMFAO	Guy on bicycle
2012	"Bird on a Wire"	Action Bronson featuring Riff Raff	Dirt Nasty
2016	"World Wide Lamper"	Kool Keith featuring B.a.R.S. Murre & Dirt Nasty	Dirt Nasty
2020	"Burning Man"	Jonah and Jeff Wittek	Dirt Nasty
2024	"Lucky"	Halsey	Love interest
2024	"BBA"	Paris Hilton featuring Megan Thee Stallion	Party guest

== Discography ==
=== Studio albums ===
- Catching Up to Wilt (with Mickey Avalon, Andre Legacy, and Beardo) (2004)
- Dirt Nasty (2007)
- Shoot to Kill (with Mickey Avalon, Andre Legacy, and Beardo) (2008)
- The White Album (with DJ Stretch Armstrong) (2010)
- Nasty as I Wanna Be (2010)
- Palatial (2013)
- The White Boys (with Andre Legacy and Beardo) (2014)
- Breakfast in Bed (with Smoov-e) (2015)
- Dirt Nasty Sux (2016)

=== Mixtapes ===
- The White Album (2010)
- Shoot to Kill Mixtape (with Mickey Avalon, Andre Legacy, & BEARDO) (2008)

=== Extended plays ===
- Extended Package (with Jack Splash as Chain Swangaz) (2011)
- ¡Three Loco! (with Andy Milonakis and Riff Raff) (2012)

=== Guest appearances ===
- Mickey Avalon – "My Dick" from Mickey Avalon (2005)
- Mickey Avalon – "What Do You Say" from Mickey Avalon (2006)
- Luckyiam – "Nevermind" from Most Likely to Succeed (2007)
- Verb – "1980 Gutter" from The East Side Extraterrestrial EP (2009)
- Mac Lethal – "My Cadillac" from Postcards from Kansas EP
- Kool Keith – "World Wide Lamper" from Feature Magnetic (2016)
- Pete Davidson – "Short Ass Movie" on SNL (2022)

=== Productions ===
- The Grouch & Eligh – "Can't Catch Me" from No More Greener Grasses (2003)
- Luckyiam – "Rap, Rap, Rap" from Most Likely to Succeed (2007)

== Awards and nominations ==
Year	Association	Category	Work	Result	Ref
2021	Los Angeles Film Critics Association	Best Actor	Red Rocket	Won	
2021	Mill Valley Film Festival	MVFF Award	Red Rocket	Awarded	
2021	Newport Beach Film Festival	Breakout Performance Award	Red Rocket	Awarded	
2021	SCAD Savannah Film Festival	Spotlight Award	Red Rocket	Awarded	
2021	Chicago Film Critics Association	Best Actor	Red Rocket	Nominated	
2021	Gotham Awards	Outstanding Lead Performance	Red Rocket	Nominated	
2022	Independent Spirit Awards	Best Male Lead	Red Rocket	Won	
2022	Seattle Film Critics Society	Best Actor	Red Rocket	Nominated	
2022	Austin Film Critics Association	Best Actor	Red Rocket	Nominated	
2022	Santa Barbara International Film Festival	Virtuoso Award	Red Rocket	Awarded	
2022	National Society of Film Critics	Best Actor	Red Rocket	Runner-up	
