= Peach Panther =

Studio album by Riff Raff
- Released: June 24, 2016
- Recorded: 2015–16
- Genre: Hip hop
- Length: 36:29
- Label: Neon Nation Corporation; BMG; Warner Music; ADA
- Producer: Riff Raff (exec.); Russell Redeaux (exec.); Dante Primo; Top Secret Productions; Cash Fargo; DJA; Sharptasic; Juice 808; Mike & Keys; Young L; FKi

Riff Raff chronology
Neon Icon (2014)	Peach Panther (2016)	The White West (2017)

Professional ratings
Review scores
Source	Rating
AllMusic	3.5/5 stars
HipHopDX	2.4/5

Peach Panther is the second studio album by American rapper Riff Raff. The album was released on June 24, 2016, by Neon Nation Corporation and BMG Rights Management with distribution handled by Warner Music.

== Track listing ==
No.	Title	Producer(s)	Length
1.	"Peach Panther (Freestyle)"	Dante "PrimoBeats" Primo	2:43
2.	"Carlos Slim"	Cash Fargo	3:04
3.	"Only in America"	Top Secret Productions	3:17
4.	"4 Million"	Top Secret Productions	3:04
5.	"Chris Paul"	Top Secret Productions	3:20
6.	"Syrup Sippin' Assassin"	DJA	2:45
7.	"All I Ever Wanted" (featuring Dolla Bill Gates)	Top Secret Productions	3:18
8.	"I Drive By" (featuring Gucci Mane and Danny Brown)	Sharptasic	3:36
9.	"Mercedez" (featuring G-Eazy and J. Doe)	Juice 808	2:27
10.	"Don't Like to Think" (featuring Problem)	Mike and Keys	3:17
11.	"Shout out to the Bay" (featuring King Chip)	Young L	2:29
12.	"Betcha' Didn't Know" (featuring Lil Durk)	FKi 1st	3:09

== Charts ==
Chart (2016)	Peak position
US Billboard 200	69
US Top R&B/Hip-Hop Albums (Billboard)	3
