= From G's to Gents =

American reality television series

- From G's to Gents Logo
- Genre: Reality
- Created by: Jamie Foxx
- Developed by: Cris Abrego
- Starring: Fonzworth Bentley; C. Frederick Secrease as Frederick
- Country of origin: United States
- Original language: English
- No. of seasons: 2
- No. of episodes: 20

Production
- Executive producers: Jaime Rucker King; Jamie Foxx; Marcus King
- Producer: Naomi Allen
- Running time: 60 minutes (with commercials)
- Production companies: 51 Minds Entertainment; Foxxking Entertainment

Original release
- Network: MTV
- Release: July 15, 2008 – April 10, 2009

From G's to Gents is an American reality television series aired on MTV, which features misdirected young men willing to change their lives and become gentlemen. The show is hosted by Fonzworth Bentley, and premiered on MTV on July 15, 2008. The objective of the show is to make the transformation from a roughneck to a sophisticated gentleman within the given time. The second season premiered on February 10, 2009.

== Voting process ==
The voting procedure differs from other voting processes, due to the use of an "Ebony Sphere" or "Black Ball" to decide the fate of other cast members. Each player places a BlackBall in the corresponding box labeled with an opposing players name. At that time, the two (or more) players with the most votes are taken in front of Fonzworth Bentley. The chosen players are then assessed, and Bentley alone makes the final decision.

In season 1, voting was overseen by judge Isaac Berkeley DeWilliams III, who would often interact with the contestants on a personal and romantic level.

== Season information ==
Season	Premiere	Finale	Reunion	Episodes	Winner	Runner-up
1	July 15, 2008	September 16, 2008	September 23, 2008	10	Creepa	Shotta
2	February 10, 2009	April 14, 2009	April 14, 2009	10	Mito	Blue
