= CL discography =

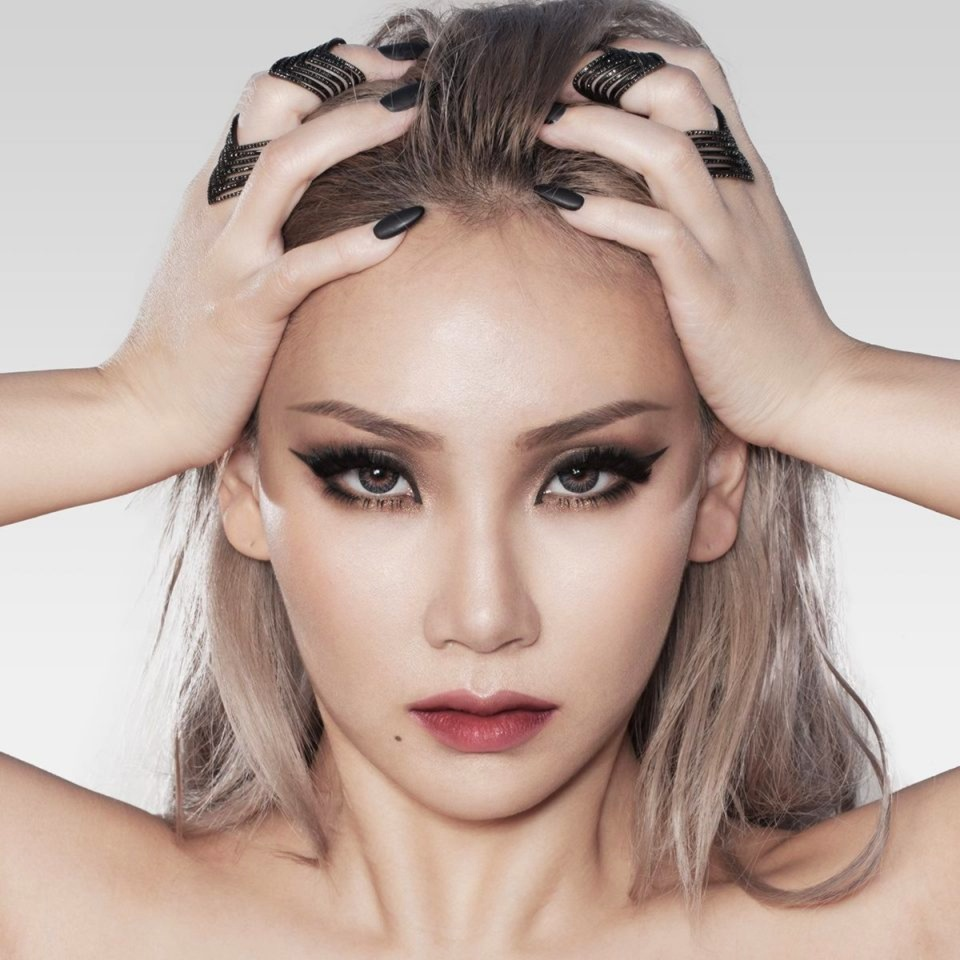
- CL for "Hello Bitches"
- Studio albums: 1
- EPs: 1
- Singles: 18
- Soundtrack appearances: 1

The discography of South Korean rapper and singer CL consists of one studio album, one extended play and eighteen singles. Her debut solo single "The Baddest Female" peaked within the top five on the Gaon Digital Chart. "MTBD" was released in 2014, as part of 2NE1's final studio album Crush (2014). In December 2014, CL released a single titled "Dirty Vibe" with Skrillex, Diplo, and G-Dragon. The standalone singles "Doctor Pepper" and "Hello Bitches" were released in 2015.

In 2016, her first English-language single "Lifted" became the first entry by a solo female Korean artist to appear on the Billboard Hot 100. In 2019, she released the EP In the Name of Love, and five of its six tracks peaked within the top 15 on the Billboard World Digital Songs chart.

== Studio albums ==
List of studio albums, with release date and label shown
Title	Album details	Peak chart positions				Sales
Title	Album details	KOR	UK Indie BKR	US Curr. Sales	US World	Sales
Alpha	Released: October 20, 2021; Label: Very Cherry; Formats: CD, digital download, vinyl	16	18	82	15	KOR: 13,665

== Extended plays ==
List of extended plays, with release date and label shown
Title	EP details
In the Name of Love	Released: December 17, 2019; Label: SuneV, Kakao M; Formats: Digital download, streaming; Track listing: 1. "Done"; 2. "Rewind"; 3. "Paradox"; 4. "One and Only"; 5. "I Quit"; 6. "Thnx"

== Singles ==
=== As lead artist ===
List of songs, with selected details, chart positions, and sales
Title	Year	Peak chart positions					Sales	Album
Title	Year	KOR	KOR Hot	US	US D/E	US World	Sales	Album
"Please Don't Go" (with Minzy)	2009	7	—	—	—	—	—N/a	To Anyone
"The Baddest Female" (나쁜 기집애)	2013	4	4	—	—	4	KOR: 550,000; US: 26,000	Non-album singles
"Dirty Vibe" (with Skrillex, Diplo, and G-Dragon)	2014	— (Note: "Dirty Vibe" did not enter the Gaon Digital Chart, but peaked at number 6 on the Gaon International Chart.)	—	—	15	—	—N/a	Recess
"Doctor Pepper" (with Diplo, Riff Raff, and OG Maco)	2015	— (Note: "Doctor Pepper" did not enter the Gaon Digital Chart, but peaked at number 47 on the Gaon Download Chart.)	—	—	—	—	—N/a	Non-album singles
"Hello Bitches"	2015	21	—	—	—	—	KOR: 225,000	Non-album singles
"Lifted"	2016	—	—	94	— (Note: "Lifted" entered US Rap Digital Songs at number 31.)	—	—N/a	Non-album singles
"Done"	2019	154	—	—	—	3	—N/a	In the Name of Love
"Rewind"	2019	—	—	—	—	4	—N/a	In the Name of Love
"Hwa"	2020	— (Note: "Hwa" did not enter the Gaon Digital Chart, but debuted and peaked at number 151 on the Gaon Download Chart.)	—	—	—	3	—N/a	Alpha
"5 Star"	2020	—	—	—	—	13	—N/a	Alpha
"Wish You Were Here"	2021	— (Note: "Wish You Were Here" did not enter the Gaon Digital Chart, but debuted and peaked at number 158 on the Gaon Download Chart.)	—	—	—	—	—N/a	Non-album single
"Spicy"	2021	— (Note: "Spicy" did not enter the Gaon Digital Chart, but debuted and peaked at number 52 on the Gaon Download Chart.)	96	—	—	16	—N/a	Alpha
"Lover Like Me"	2021	— (Note: "Lover Like Me" did not enter the Gaon Digital Chart, but debuted at number 35 on the Gaon Download Chart.)	—	—	—	—	—N/a	Alpha
"Tie a Cherry"	2021	— (Note: "Tie a Cherry" did not enter the Gaon Digital Chart, but debuted at number 49 on the Gaon Download Chart.)	—	—	—	—	—N/a	Alpha
"Iconic"	2026	To be released						TBA
"—" denotes a recording that did not chart or was not released in that territory.

=== As featured artist ===
Title	Year	Peak chart positions							Sales	Album
Title	Year	KOR	KOR Hot	AUS	CAN	US	US Dance	US World	Sales	Album
"Hot Issue" (BigBang featuring CL)	2007	—	—	—	—	—	—	—	—N/a	Hot Issue
"DJ" Uhm Jung-hwa featuring CL	2008	—	—	—	—	—	—	—	—N/a	D.I.S.C.O
"What" (YMGA featuring YG Family and DJ Wreckx)	2008	—	—	—	—	—	—	—	—N/a	Non-album single
"The Leaders" (G-Dragon featuring CL and Teddy)	2009	—	—	—	—	—	—	—	—N/a	Heartbreaker
"Kiss" (Sandara Park featuring CL)	2009	73	—	—	—	—	—	—	—N/a	To Anyone
"Daddy" (Psy featuring CL)	2015	1	—	103	36	97	6	1	US: 4,000	Chiljip Psy-da
"Surrender" (Lil Yachty featuring CL and Shaiana)	2017	—	—	—	—	—	—	—	—N/a	Teenage Emotions
"Dopeness" (The Black Eyed Peas featuring CL)	2018	—	—	—	—	—	—	—	—N/a	Masters of the Sun Vol. 1
"Cut It Up" (PKCZ featuring CL and Afrojack)	2019	—	—	—	—	—	—	—	—N/a	Non-album single
"Looooose Controlla" (Kim Ximya featuring CL)	2020	—	—	—	—	—	—	—	—N/a	Dog
"No Blueberries" (DPR Ian featuring DPR Live, CL)	2020	—	—	—	—	—	—	—	—N/a	Moodswings in This Order
"Rosario" (Epik High featuring Zico & CL)	2021	11	15	—	—	—	—	11	—N/a	Epik High is Here 上 (Part 1)
"Good Day 2025 (Telepathy + By the Moonlight Window)" (Note: G-Dragon featuring Hwang Jung-min, Defconn, Hong Jin-kyung, Jung Hyung-don, Jo Se-ho, Kian84, Anh Sung-jae, Taeyang, Jung Hae-in, Hwang Kwang-hee, Yim Si-wan, Lee Soo-hyuk, Daesung, Code Kunst, CL, Kim Go-eun, Day6, BSS and Aespa)	2025	21	—	—	—	—	—	—	—N/a	Non-album single
"—" denotes a recording that did not chart or was not released in that territory.

== Other charted songs ==
Title	Year	Peak chart positions			Sales	Album
Title	Year	KOR	KOR Hot	US World	Sales	Album
"MTBD" (멘붕)	2014	15	16	9	KOR: 648,000	Crush
"Paradox"	2019	— (Note: "Paradox" did not enter the Gaon Digital Chart, but debuted and peaked at number 192 on the Gaon Download Chart.)	—	7		In the Name of Love
"I Quit"	2019	—	—	9		In the Name of Love
"One and Only"	2019	—	—	13		In the Name of Love
"Thnx"	2019	—	—	16		In the Name of Love
"Let It"	2021	— (Note: "Let It" did not enter the Gaon Digital Chart, but debuted at number 140 on the Gaon Download Chart.)	—	—		Alpha
"—" denotes a recording that did not chart or was not released in that territory.

== Soundtrack appearances ==
Title	Year	Album
"No Better Feelin'"	2017	My Little Pony: The Movie

== Unreleased songs ==
Title	Notes
"All In"	Originally supposed to be released in 2016
"Fool For Love"	Featuring Dylan Brady
"Liar"	
"I'll Be There"	An acoustic version was performed by CL on Livin' the Double Life in 2017.
"No Company"	A Mandarin version titled "No Company" was performed by trainees on Youth with You 2020.
"No Diamonds"	

== Songwriting credits ==
Year	Album	Song	Lyrics		Music	
Year	Album	Song	Credited	With	Credited	With
2009	Heartbreaker	"The Leaders"	Yes	G-Dragon, Teddy Park	No	—N/a
2013	Non-album single	"The Baddest Female"	Yes	Teddy Park	No	—N/a
2014	Crush	"Crush"	Yes	—N/a	Yes	Choice37
2014	Crush	"If I Were You"	Yes	—N/a	Yes	Dee.P
2014	Crush	"MTBD" (멘붕)	Yes	Teddy Park	No	—N/a
2014	Crush	"Scream"	Yes	—N/a	No	—N/a
2014	Crush	"Baby I Miss You"	Yes	—N/a	Yes	Choice37, Dee.P
2015	Non-album singles	"Doctor Pepper"	Yes	Thomas Wesley Pentz, Riff Raff, OG Maco, Brian Wollman, Jordan Safford	No	—N/a
2015	Non-album singles	"Hello Bitches"	Yes	Teddy Park, Danny Chung, Jean-Baptiste Kouame	No	—N/a
2016	Non-album singles	"Lifted"	Yes	Teddy Park, Asher Roth, Robert Diggs, Clifford Smith	No	—N/a
2016	Non-album singles	"₩1,000,000"	Yes	G-Dragon, Okasian, BewhY	No	—N/a
2017	Non-album singles	"Goodbye"	Yes	Oh Hyuk	No	—N/a
2019	In the Name of Love	"Done"	Yes	Bobby Brackins	No	—N/a
2019	In the Name of Love	"Rewind"	Yes	August Grant	No	—N/a
2019	In the Name of Love	"Paradox"	Yes	Tokki	No	—N/a
2019	In the Name of Love	"One And Only"	Yes	Tokki	No	—N/a
2019	In the Name of Love	"I Quit"	Yes	Tokki	No	—N/a
2019	In the Name of Love	"Thnx"	Yes	N/A	Yes	—N/a
2020	Alpha	"Hwa"	Yes	Jean-Baptiste Kouame, Napolian Evans, Tokki	No	—N/a
2020	Alpha	"5 Star"	Yes	Koko LaRoo, Jean-Baptiste Kouame, Suburban Plaza, Tablo	No	—N/a
2021	Non-album single	"Wish You Were Here"	Yes	Asia Whiteacre, Boniq, Elizabeth Mencel, Gary Hill, MNEK	No	—N/a
2021	Alpha	"Spicy"	Yes	Boniq, Holly, Fabian Mazur, Sokodomo	No	—N/a
2021	Alpha	"Lover Like Me"	Yes	Anne-Marie Nicholson, Freedo, Nafla, Cleo Tighe, Sarah Blanchard	No	—N/a
2021	Alpha	"Chuck"	Yes	Kesington Kross, Boniq, Hamelin, Ian Thomas	No	—N/a
2021	Alpha	"Xai"	Yes	Ryan Marrone, Dave Hamelin, Donut, Paul Phamous, Dyo	No	—N/a
2021	Alpha	"Let it"	Yes	Boniq, Hong Ji-sang	No	—N/a
2021	Alpha	"Tie a Cherry"	Yes	Julia Allyn Ross, Sokodomo, Gino Bombrini, Kyan Palmer, Krysta Youngs, Peter Chun, Lee	No	—N/a
2021	Alpha	"Paradise"	Yes	Taylor Ross, Starrah, Rogét Chahayed, Rahki, Quan, M.a.xxx, Stefano Maggiore, June, J Gramm	No	—N/a
2021	Alpha	"My Way"	Yes	Sweater Beats, Hamelin, Dan Henig, Alex T	No	—N/a
2021	Alpha	"Siren"	Yes	Retro Future, Mad Max, Kimbra, Lee	No	—N/a
