= Power World Tour =

2014 concert tour by YG Entertainment

- Asia tour by YG Family
- Location: Asia
- Start date: April 12, 2014
- End date: October 25, 2014
- No. of shows: 10

YG Family concert chronology
- 15th Anniversary Concert (2011–2012); Power World Tour (2014)

The Power World Tour (also known as the Power Galaxy Tour) is the second world tour by South Korean music label YG Entertainment in 2014, the last being the Past, Present & the Future world tour in 2006. The tour marks the entertainment agency's first family concert in two years. The tour kicked off at Kyocera Dome in Osaka, Japan for a two-day performance on April 12 and 13 before visiting other cities in Japan, China and Korea. The tour was officially sponsored by Samsung Galaxy in China, Taiwan and Singapore.

== Artists ==
- Big Bang
- Psy
- 2NE1
- Epik High
- Lee Hi
- Akdong Musician
- Winner
- iKON

== Set list ==
This set list is representative of the show on April 12, 2014 in Osaka. It is not representative of all concerts for the duration of the tour.

1. "Crush" (2NE1)
2. "Fire" (2NE1)
3. "Come Back Home" (2NE1)
4. "Gotta Be You" (2NE1)
5. "Go Up" (Winner)
6. "Missing You (2NE1 cover)" (Winner)
7. "Smile Again" (Winner)
8. "Fly" (Epik High)
9. "Love Love Love (feat. Dara)" (Epik High)
10. "Don’t Hate Me" (Epik High)
11. "Haru Haru" (Big Bang)
12. "Blue" (Big Bang)
13. "Koe o Kikasete" (Big Bang)
14. "Fantastic Baby" (Big Bang)
15. "Just Another Boy" (Winner and iKON)
16. "Climax" (iKON)
17. "The Baddest Male" (G-Dragon)
18. "MTBD" (CL)
19. "Crayon" (G-Dragon and Seungri)
20. "Doom Dada" (T.O.P, Mino, Dara)
21. "Ugly (2NE1 cover)" (Daesung and Seungyoon)
22. "Ringa Linga" (Taeyang and Team B)
23. "Rose" (Lee Hi)
24. "1. 2. 3. 4." (Lee Hi and Minzy)
25. "If I Were You" (Lee Hi and 2NE1)
26. "Tomorrow (feat. Taeyang)" (Tablo)
27. "Up (feat. Park Bom)" (Epik High)
28. "Phone Number (Jinusean cover)" (DJ Tukutz, Winner, iKON)
29. "High High (GD&TOP cover)" (Winner and iKON)
30. "I Love You (2NE1 cover)" (Big Bang)
31. "Scream" (2NE1)
32. "I Am the Best" (2NE1)
33. "Can't Nobody" (2NE1)
34. "Tonight" (Big Bang)
35. "Hands Up" (Big Bang)
36. "Gara Gara Go!" (Big Bang)
37. "Lies" (Big Bang)
38. "My Heaven" (Big Bang)

Encore (by YG Family)

1. "Go Away" (2NE1 song)
2. "Gangnam Style" (Psy song)
3. "Fantastic Baby" (Big Bang song)

== Tour dates ==
List of tour dates
Date	City	Country	Venue	Attendance
April 12, 2014	Osaka	Japan	Kyocera Dome	210,000
April 13, 2014	Osaka	Japan	Kyocera Dome	210,000
May 3, 2014	Tokyo	Japan	Tokyo Dome	210,000
May 4, 2014	Tokyo	Japan	Tokyo Dome	210,000
August 15, 2014	Seoul	South Korea	Seoul Olympic Stadium	35,000
August 30, 2014	Shanghai	China	Shanghai Stadium	35,000
September 13, 2014	Singapore		Singapore Indoor Stadium	20,000
September 14, 2014	Singapore		Singapore Indoor Stadium	20,000
October 19, 2014	Beijing	China	Workers' Stadium	—
October 25, 2014	Taoyuan	Taiwan	Taoyuan City Stadium	23,000
Total				400,000
