= MTBD (song) =

Song by CL

from the album Crush
- Language: Korean; English
- Released: February 27, 2014
- Genre: K-hip hop; dubstep; electro; trap
- Length: 3:15
- Label: YG
- Songwriters: Teddy Park; Lee Chae-rin
- Producer: Teddy Park

CL singles chronology
"The Baddest Female" (2013)	"MTBD" (2014)	"Dirty Vibe" (2014)

Audio video
- "멘붕 (MTBD)" on YouTube

"MTBD" (Korean: 멘붕; RR: Menbung) is a song by South Korean rapper and singer CL. It was released through YG Entertainment on February 27, 2014, as a track off 2NE1's final studio album Crush (2014). "MTBD", which derives from the phrase "mental breakdown", was written and produced by Teddy Park with additional lyrics penned by CL. The song was used in the fifth episode of Fox's Lucifer, which was broadcast in February 2016.

== Background and music ==
"MTBD" was confirmed to be included in the tracklist for 2NE1's second Korean-language studio album, titled Crush on February 19, 2014. The song was subsequently released on February 27 as part of Crush, as the sixth track off of the album. The song serves as CL's second solo track during her career with 2NE1, with her first solo single being "The Baddest Female" (2013). "MTBD" was written by both CL and long-time 2NE1 collaborator Teddy Park, with additional production by Park. "MTBD", which is an acronym stemming from the phrase "mental breakdown", integrates the genres of EDM, hip-pop and bubblegum trap and consists of a tense drum beat, low bass, and a unique synth sound. It interpolates a strong dubstep and trap beat complemented by her "inimitable" style.

CL was accused of blasphemy following the release of "MTBD", particularly amongst Muslims, for incorporating chanted verses from the Quran. A re-edited version was released and the incorporated verses were removed.

== Reception ==
Following the release of Crush, "MTBD" was met with positive reviews from music critics. August Brown of the Los Angeles Times named it the best track off of the album, writing that the "808-destroying stomper as good as anything on rap radio in America right now." Rolling Stone referred to the track as the centerpiece of Crush and further complimented CL's confidence. Writing for Billboard, Tamar Herman viewed the track favorably, writing that the solo track remains one of her strongest works to date. The publication wrote in another view that the song "is the show-stopping centerpiece where CL’s ferocious flow takes no prisoners amid twitching triple hi-hats and the bass going 'boom boom boom.' Billboard further ranked the song as the second best K-Pop Deep Cut in December 2017, praising the song's production and composition in addition to CL's musicality. Fuse said that CL "takes center stage on the incredible solo track 'MTBD,' which sounds like an upgraded version of DJ Snake's 'Turn Down for What.'"

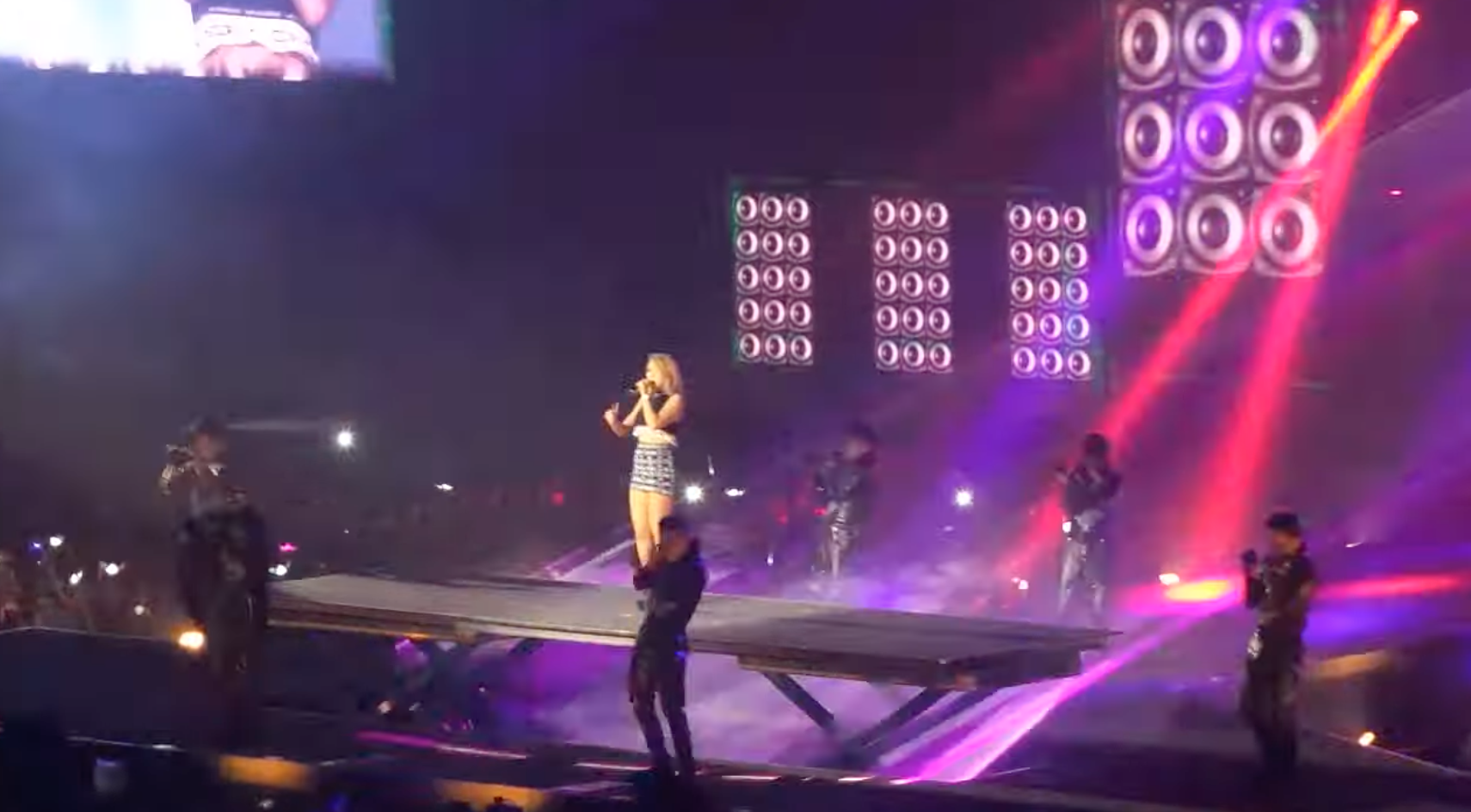
CL performing the track on 2NE1's All Or Nothing Tour in Jakarta in June 2014

== Live performances ==
CL performed the track live for the first time on 2NE1's two-day stop on their All or Nothing World Tour in Seoul on March 1 and 2, 2014. On March 7, a video of her tour performance was uploaded to 2NE1's YouTube channel. The stage was met with favorable reception among fans, who praised CL's stage charisma, stating that "it's not a joke", and "it's a live jackpot". The track was performed months later for the 2014 YG Family Power World Tour.

The track was a part of setlist for CL's Hello Bitches Tour (2016) in North America. During the show at the Los Angeles show, she faced controversy again with the track in November 2016 after performing the unedited version of "MTBD". CL quickly issued an apology and corrected the issue by her next concert.

For 2NE1's Welcome Back Tour (2024-2025), CL performed the medley of "The Baddest Female" with "MTBD" as a part of the tour setlist; both were shortened, and "MTBD" was rearranged with the song second chorus swapped position with the song outro.

== Charts ==
=== Weekly charts ===
Chart (2014)	Peak position
South Korea (Gaon)	15
South Korea (K-pop Hot 100)	16
US World Digital Songs (Billboard)	9

=== Monthly charts ===
Chart (March 2014)	Peak position
South Korea (Gaon Chart)	22
