= Come Back Home (2NE1 song) =

Single by 2NE1

from the album Crush
- Language: Korean
- Released: February 27, 2014
- Studio: YG Studios (Seoul)
- Genre: Electropop; R&B; reggae; trap
- Length: 3:50
- Label: YG
- Songwriters: Teddy Park; Choi Pil-kang; Dee.P
- Producer: Teddy Park

2NE1 singles chronology
"Missing You" (2013)	"Come Back Home" (2014)	"Gotta Be You" (2014)

Music video
- "Come Back Home" on YouTube

"Come Back Home" is a song recorded by South Korean girl group 2NE1 for their second and final Korean-language studio album, Crush (2014). The song was released on February 27, 2014, through YG Entertainment in conjunction with the release of the album and serves as one of its two title tracks. Written and produced by Teddy Park along with Choi Pil-kang and Dee.P, the song is a hybrid of a variety of musical genres, including electropop, R&B, reggae and trap. An unplugged version of the single was also made available on the album.

The song received generally positive reviews from music critics, who complimented its musical style and production. Commercially, it maintained the top position on the Gaon Digital Chart for two consecutive weeks and sold nearly 1,300,000 digital units in the country by the end of 2014. 2NE1 received several accolades for "Come Back Home", including Song of the Year – March at the 3rd Gaon Chart K-Pop Awards and Best Electronic Song at the 2014 Melon Music Awards.

The music video for the song, directed by Dee Shin, was released on March 2, 2014, and was noted for its high production value and use of computer-generated imagery. The video, reminiscent of the film The Matrix (1999), incorporates an array of dystopian and futuristic elements intertwined with the concept of a virtual paradise. To promote the song, 2NE1 appeared on Inkigayo and M Countdown throughout March 2014, and included the song on the setlist for their All or Nothing World Tour.

== Background and release ==
On February 13, 2014, YG Entertainment officially confirmed via YG Life the release of 2NE1's second Korean-language studio album, titled Crush, for February 24. On February 19, it was announced that the release of the album would be postponed to two days later than originally intended, in order to coincide with the birthday of CL on the 26th. The tracklist for the album was simultaneously unveiled, and it was announced that "Come Back Home" would serve as one of the record's two singles, alongside "Gotta Be You".

The name of "Come Back Home" initially sparked curiosity amongst fans due to it being reminiscent of the popular 1995 song of the same name by Seo Taiji and Boys—which Yang Hyun-suk, the founder of YG Entertainment, was a member of. 2NE1 leader CL confirmed in an interview that the name of the song was in fact intended to pay homage to Seo Taiji and Boys, although the music video concept would remain different. Both Crush and "Come Back Home" were released as planned at midnight local time on February 27, 2014, with the song being made available for digital consumption in various countries. An acoustic "unplugged" version of "Come Back Home" was also recorded and was included on the tracklist of Crush.

== Composition and lyrics ==
"Come Back Home" (Original version)
"Come Back Home" is characterized as a genre-bending hybrid track that incorporates a variety of musical influences, such as electropop, reggae and trap. Lyrically, the song revolves around the group members asking for their lovers to "come back home".

"Come Back Home" was written and produced by long time YG-collaborator Teddy Park, with additional composition and arrangement both being handled by the duo Choi Pil-kang and Dee.P of Future Bounce. Musically, "Come Back Home" consists of a diverse and contrasting range of musical styles, with the most predominant genres being electropop, R&B, and hip-hop. The genre-bending electro-reggae-acoustic-EDM-hybrid has been characterized as a crossover dance number, integrating both modern and retro musical elements—such as Atlanta trap drums and pop-reggae guitars. Composed in the standard time signature of 4/4 and the key of C minor, the track possesses a rather fast tempo of 150 beats per minute. Dazed commented that the reggae-tinged deep electronica track was reminiscent of the group's previous hits such as "I Love You" and "Falling in Love" (2013). Writing for Billboard magazine, Jeff Benjamin referred to the song as a reggae-trap hybrid that mashes the two distinct genres into a "booming final product". "Opening with a bouncy beat similar to Rihanna's 'Man Down'", Benjamin wrote, "the girls croon about losing a lover, asking him to 'come back home' until the production flips into a heavy trap beat. At that point, the girls get seductive and demand their love to 'come, baby baby, come, baby baby.'"

== Critical reception ==
"Come Back Home" was met with generally positive reviews from music critics. Kim Young-jin from domestic webzine Weiv noted its incorporation of American pop and hip-hop styles with "advanced contemporary trends", and said that "'Come Back Home' once again confirms the direction and capabilities of YG Entertainment, not just 2NE1." Writing for PopMatters, Scott Interrante hailed "Come Back Home" as an "incredible pop song" and placed it at number 11 on his list of The Best K-pop of 2014. Corban Goble of Pitchfork referred to it as an "earworm" and deemed it among the standout tracks from Crush. On their list of Top 20 K-pop Tracks of 2014, Taylor Glasby of Dazed ranked the song at number 6, lauding the "electro dystopia" track as a key work in the year's creative overload. Glasby further praised the song's musical styles and production, writing that 2NE1 does the "sound better than anyone else, managing the surging tempo changes with ease and retaining their fierceness despite the song’s relative calm". August Brown of the Los Angeles Times commented that "'Come Back Home' tosses Atlanta trap drums, pop-reggae guitars and Robyn's bleary-eyed pleading into one song and makes it work". Jeff Benjamin of Billboard additionally ranked the song the seventh best single of the group's discography in January 2017.

"Come Back Home" on listicles
Publication	List	Rank	Ref.
Billboard	Every 2NE1 Single Ranked: Critic's Take	7	
Billboard	25 Top Viewed 2014 K-Pop Videos in America	6	
Dazed	Top 20 K-pop tracks of 2014	6	
PopMatters	The Best of K-pop of 2014	11	
SBS PopAsia	Top 100 songs of 2014	7	
SBS PopAsia	27 best K-pop songs from 2014 – 2016	Placed	

== Commercial performance ==
Commercially, "Come Back Home" experienced success in South Korea. In its opening week, the song entered the Gaon Digital Chart at number two, placing just behind Girls' Generation's "Mr.Mr". In only four days of tracking, the song accumulated 2,758,049 streams and 276,288 units in digital sales, making it the week's second best-selling song. "Come Back Home" rose to the top position on the digital chart the following week, becoming the group's ninth and final number-one single in the country—extending their record at the time for the most number one songs out of any lead artist. It would stay atop the chart for an additional week, before descending to number three. The track sold a cumulative total of 547,474 digital units in addition to garnering 19,255,908 streams in the month of March, and ranked as the month's best performing single. By the end of the year, "Come Back Home" was placed at number 23 on the year-end Gaon Digital Chart and was ranked as the 12th best-selling single in the country, selling a total of 1,294,905 digital units. In addition, the song peaked at number four on the US World Digital Song Sales, becoming 2NE1's ninth top-five single on the chart. On the K-pop Hot 100, the song peaked at number two, and stayed within the top 10 for 9 weeks, becoming one of the longest songs to do so on the Korean Billboard chart.

== Accolades ==
Awards and nominations for "Come Back Home"
Year	Organization	Award	Result	Ref.
2014	Mnet Asian Music Awards	Best Female Group	Nominated	
2014	Melon Music Awards	Best Electronica Song	Won	
2014	SBS MTV Best of the Best	Best Female Music Video	Nominated	
2015	Gaon Chart K-pop Awards	Song of the Year – March	Won	
2015	Golden Disc Awards	Digital Bonsang	Nominated	
2015	Myx Music Awards	Favorite K-pop Video Award	Won	
2015	V Chart Awards	Best Music Video of the Year – Korea	Won	
2023	Korea World Music Culture Hall of Fame	Hall of Fame	Inducted	

Music program awards
Program	Date	Ref.
Inkigayo	March 16, 2014	
M Countdown	March 20, 2014	
M Countdown	March 27, 2014	

== Music video ==
The plotline of the music video involves the members pursuing to destroy the "virtual paradise" and bring its entrants back into reality.

The music video for the song, directed by Dee Shin, was uploaded to 2NE1's YouTube channel on March 2, 2014. Yang Hyun-suk described the music video as "set in a near-future city", with the concept revolving around the notion that people in the said era prefer the virtual world over the real one, similar to the movie The Matrix (1999). With the increasing focus and reliance of technology, the theme of the music video attempts to convey the "importance and humanity of reality". In addition, Yang commented that, "Up to now, 2NE1 has filmed a lot of music videos mainly showcasing the song's choreography, but this time I wanted to try new things." In the computer generated graphics-heavy visual, the group is seen living in a futuristic world where one can escape reality and enter a "virtual paradise" with a special machine. The dystopian-like real world features a normal girl (played by Dara) whose boyfriend is addicted to the virtual paradise and would rather be in the fantasy environment than with her. As a result, all four members go from their real world and transform into warrior rebels to infiltrate the virtual environment in order to destroy it from the inside. Filled with elaborate sets, special effects, and unique wardrobes, the video garnered notability for its high production value of half a million dollars to effectively exude a futuristic atmosphere, and has been compared to the likes of science fiction movies.

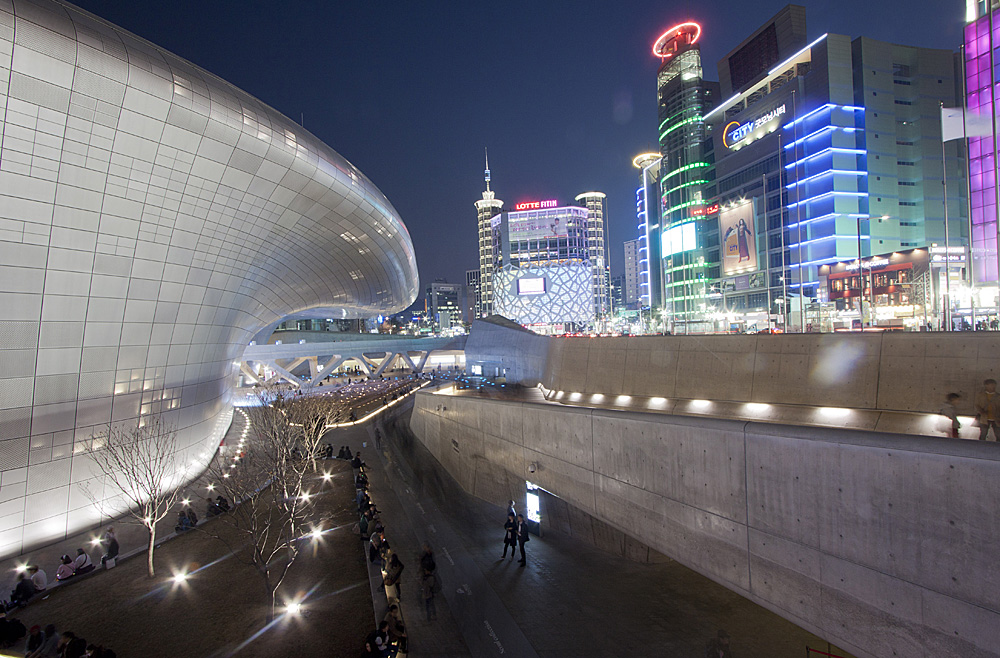
The ending of the music video was shot at the Dongdaemun Design Plaza in Seoul.

Following the music video's release, Joseph R. Atilano of the Inquirer wrote that the "video for 'Come Back Home' is a visual feast and showcases why K-pop groups like 2NE1 currently have a strong and sizable following from around the world". Popdust commented, "'Come Back Home' is laced with giffable special effects and bonkers CGI, all of which work perfectly against the genre-bending electro-reggae-acoustic-EDM-hybrid song." An additional music video for the unplugged version of the song was initially announced alongside the original video; however, it was never released.

== Promotion and live performances ==
2NE1 kicked off their third concert tour, titled the All or Nothing World Tour, shortly after the release of Crush on March 1 and included the song in its set list. To promote "Come Back Home" directly, 2NE1 appeared on the music programs Inkigayo and M Countdown throughout the remainder of the month. The group made the song's televised debut on Inkigayo and March 9, and subsequently appeared on M Countdown for the first time on March 13. The track was choreographed by Yang Hyun-suk, incorporating elements from the choreography of the popular 1995 track of the same name by Seo Taiji and Boys. According to YG insiders, the members of 2NE1 specifically requested for Yang himself to create the choreography for the song, as they felt that the elements from Seo Taiji and Boys would also suit the color of 2NE1's new performances.

On May 23, 2014, 2NE1 made an appearance on You Hee-yeol's Sketchbook where they performed the unplugged version of the song live in order to commemorate the Sewol ferry disaster that occurred a month prior on April 16. In the performance, each of the group members are seen bearing a yellow ribbon—which served as a symbol of remembrance and sympathy for the lives lost in the sinking. The stage was met with positive reception amongst netizens, who applauded 2NE1's emotional delivery with comments such as "I got live goose bumps" as well as "the song and lyrics of 'Come Back Home' are really comforting". 2NE1 performed the song, along with "Crush", at the 2014 SBS Gayo Daejeon on December 21 without Park Bom due to her scandal at the time, and drew the highest viewership of the event with a nationwide rating of 11.1 percent.

== Credits and personnel ==
Credits adapted from Melon.

Recording

- Recorded at YG Studio, Mapo-gu, Seoul

Personnel

- 2NE1 – vocals, background vocals
- Teddy Park – lyricist, composer, arranger
- Future Bounce
  - Choi Pil-kang (P.K.) – composer, arranger
  - Dee.P – composer, arranger
- Dee Shin – music video director

== Charts ==
=== Weekly charts ===
Weekly chart performance
Chart (2014)	Peak position
South Korea (Gaon)	1
South Korea (K-pop Hot 100)	2
US World Digital Song Sales (Billboard)	4

"Come Back Home" (acoustic version)
Chart (2014)	Peak position
South Korea (Gaon)	28
South Korea (K-pop Hot 100)	39

=== Monthly charts ===
Monthly chart position for "Come Back Home"
Chart (2014)	Peak position
South Korea (Gaon)	1

=== Year-end charts ===
Year-end chart position for "Come Back Home"
Chart (2014)	Position
South Korea (Gaon)	23
US World Digital Songs (Billboard)	21

== Release history ==
Release history and formats for "Come Back Home"
Region	Date	Format(s)	Ref.
Various	February 27, 2014	Digital download; streaming	
South Korea	March 4, 2014	Airplay	
South Korea	March 11, 2014	Airplay (acoustic version)	

== See also ==
- List of most expensive music videos
