= Gotta Be You (2NE1 song) =

Single by 2NE1

from the album Crush
- Language: Korean
- Released: February 27, 2014
- Recorded: 2014
- Genre: Dance-pop; pop-rap; EDM
- Length: 3:52
- Label: YG
- Songwriter: Teddy Park
- Producers: Park; Masta Wu; P.K.

2NE1 singles chronology
"Come Back Home" (2014)	"Gotta Be You" (2014)	"Goodbye" (2017)

Music video
- "Gotta Be You" on YouTube

"Gotta Be You" (Korean: 너 아님 안돼; RR: Neo anim andwae) is a song recorded by South Korean girl group 2NE1. It is the second single from the group's final studio album Crush, following "Come Back Home", which was released on February 27, 2014. Its music video was released on May 21. The track peaked at number three on the Gaon Digital Chart and was ranked number 42 for the most downloaded songs in South Korea in 2014.

== Background ==
"Gotta Be You"
A 23-second sample of "Gotta Be You", which is described as an EDM and dance-pop song.

"Gotta Be You" is described as a synthy dance-pop song with elements of hip-hop and EDM. The track was written by long-time YG Entertainment collaborator Teddy Park and was co-produced by Park, Masta Wu, and P.K.

== Music video ==
The music video for the song was released on May 21, 2014, and was uploaded "to celebrate their fifth anniversary of their debut." The music video combines elements of Roy Lichtenstein's comic books and Andy Warhol's Brillo Boxes along with splashes of graffiti, emoticons and neon seen throughout the set. 2NE1 teamed up with fashion designer Jeremy Scott for the "pop art-inspired video". It featured Ash Stymest as CL's love interest.

== Promotions and live performances ==
The song was performed twice on SBS's Inkigayo along with the album's first Korean-language single "Come Back Home". The dance practice video was uploaded to the group's official YouTube channel on March 17. "Gotta Be You" was also featured on the setlist for their All or Nothing World Tour that spanned from March, following the release of the album, to October.

== Awards ==
Year	Organization	Award	Result	Ref.
2014	MTV Iggy	Song of the Year	Won	

== Credits ==
Credits adapted from Tidal.

Personnel

- 2NE1 – vocals
- Teddy Park – lyricist, composer, arranger
- Masta Wu – arranger
- Choi Pil-kang (P.K.) – composer

== Chart performance ==
=== Weekly charts ===
Chart (2014)	Peak position
South Korea (Gaon)	3
South Korea (K-pop Hot 100)	4

=== Monthly charts ===
Chart (2014)	Peak position
South Korea (Gaon)	5

=== Year-end charts ===
Chart (2014)	Position
South Korea (Gaon)	58

== Release history ==
Region	Date	Format	Label	Ref.
Various	February 27, 2014	Digital download; streaming	YG Entertainment	
