= All In (CL song) =

Song by CL
- Language: English
- Recorded: 2016
- Genre: Pop; tropical house
- Length: 3:35
- Label: YG
- Producers: Jordan Browning; Jon Brewer

"All In" is an unreleased song by South Korean rapper and singer CL. The song was leaked on January 1, 2018 by CL herself, when she posted a series of clips unveiling a music video for an unreleased English-language single. It was initially planned to be released in 2016, however, it was never officially released due to undisclosed reasons.

The music video, directed by Dave Meyers, was shot over a year prior to the leak and features CL performing the song on various coloured sets alongside several dancers.

== Background ==
Following the release of her debut English single "Lifted" in August 2016, the only songs that CL released during 2017 was a track on the My Little Pony film soundtrack (2017) and another unreleased song titled "I'll Be There", which she performed an acoustic rendition of on Korean television on December 21, 2017. A week later on January 1, 2018, CL posted several clips to her Instagram story featuring her performing an unnamed English-language track; the first clip showed CL with dancers dressed as fencers, while the second featured her performing the song's chorus, singing the line "I need you all in".

I remember this time last year, I promised myself I would put new music out in 2017. I know you've all been waiting and I wanted to end the year with a gift to you guys. This video is something I shot over a year ago and it may or may not ever come out but I always loved it and was sad that it never got a chance to make it to you guys. Showing this little bit that I am able to may get me in trouble but it's worth the risk to give you something and keep my promise. I'm all in.

— CL after uploading clips of the music video for the unreleased single "All In" on Instagram

A stylist who worked on the video expressed to the media that "It was supposed to come out [in 2016], but it never did", and that "the costly shoot had been a grind, spread over three 16-hour days on an L.A. soundstage." Meyers was equally confused by the delay, saying that "Most of the other artists I work with [release the video] literally the day I finish [it]". "It was nice to see her leak it, but it's actually a good time for me to call her and ask what's going on. Like, 'What the hell? You’re so fucking talented.'" The entire song and MV was leaked on July 1, 2025 on YouTube.

== Composition ==
A tropical house track, Bradley Stern from MuuMuse called it a "polished, sleek pop production" while comparing it to works by Nicki Minaj, Ariana Grande and Rihanna, and commented that it "sounds like an obvious fit for Top 40 radio." Owen Meyers from The Fader described it as "a squiffy electro banger powered by helium horns", with its lyrics laying out "her terms for a relationship, sung with an assurance and a seductive flair." The publication referred to it as "CL’s best solo music to date".

== Music video ==
The music video for "All In" was directed by Dave Meyers, who had also directed the videos for "Lifted", Missy Elliott's "Get Ur Freak On" (2001) and Kendrick Lamar's "Humble" (2017). It features CL performing the song's choreography amidst moody scenes in dark tunnels. Rapper Vic Mensa appears as a guest star in the music video.
