= Goodbye (2NE1 song) =

Single by 2NE1
- Language: Korean
- Written: 2016
- Released: January 21, 2017
- Genre: Ballad
- Length: 3:51
- Label: YG
- Songwriters: Lee Chae-rin; Oh Hyuk
- Producers: J Gramm; Krystin "Rook Monroe" Watkins

2NE1 singles chronology
"Gotta Be You" (2014)	"Goodbye" (2017)

Music video
- "Goodbye" on YouTube

"Goodbye" (Korean: 안녕; RR: Annyeong) is a song recorded by South Korean girl group 2NE1. It was released via YG Entertainment on January 21, 2017, as the group's farewell following their disbandment in November 2016. It was written by CL with additional lyrics penned by Hyukoh's Oh Hyuk, whilst production was handled by J Gramm and Rook Monroe. It was 2NE1's first release in three years following their hiatus and also marked the group's only work released as a trio, following Minzy's departure in April 2016.

== Background and release ==
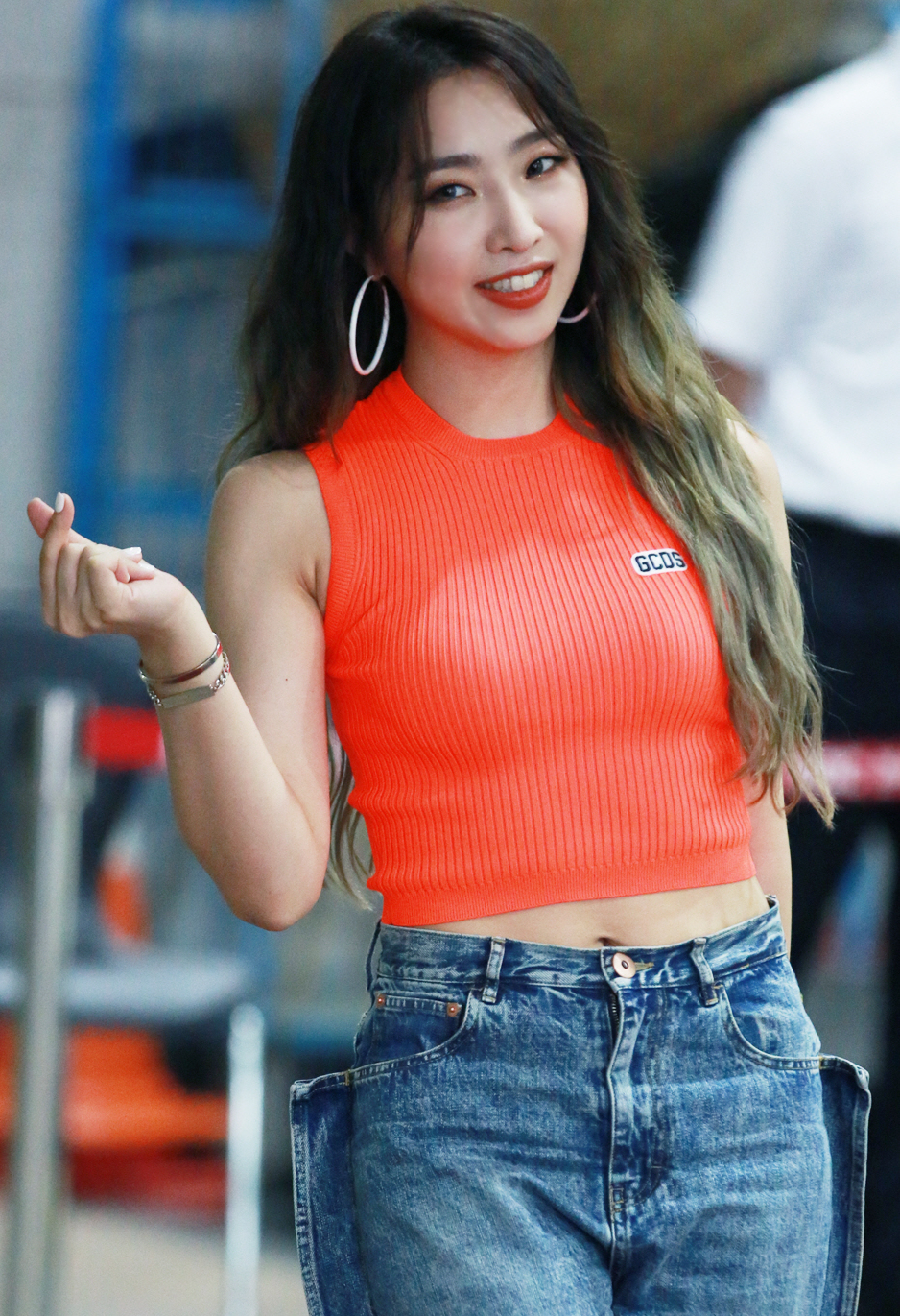
The song was initially written for Minzy after she left 2NE1 in April 2016.

On January 5, 2017, YG Entertainment announced that 2NE1 will be releasing their final song "Goodbye" for January 21. CL revealed in an interview that the song was originally meant to be a letter addressed to Minzy upon her departure from 2NE1 in April 2016. She initially wrote it for her own solo promotions and penned the original lyrics in only ten minutes. Following the group's disbandment in November 2016, CL altered the track's lyrics to reflect the remaining members and changed the original plan to release it as 2NE1's final song as a tribute. Minzy, however, revealed shortly before its release that she was unaware that the trio were releasing a new recording, and said that she only became aware of the release of "Goodbye" through the news.

== Composition and music video ==
Musically, Atwood Magazine described the song as an "elementary down-tempo ballad that fuses constant guitar strumming in tandem with the poignant tear-jerking lyrics." According to Sports Today, the music video for "Goodbye" was filmed in secret on January 3, 2017. The video evokes the feelings from the members through a black and white screening of the girls gazing at archived videos of themselves as a quartet.

== Commercial performance ==
Commercially, "Goodbye" charted moderately in South Korea, peaking at number 23 on the Gaon Digital Chart, marking the group's only Korean-language single to not have reached the top-five in their entire career. Internationally, it became the group's second single after "I Am the Best" to top the Billboard US World Digital Song Sales, garnering 5,000 paid downloads in the US within a week. It was their 16th top ten entry and 20th entry on the chart overall. In France, "Goodbye" entered the SNEP singles chart at number 109, marking their second entry in the country. It additionally peaked at number 14 on the Official Download Chart in Finland.

== Credits and personnel ==
Credits adapted from Melon.

- 2NE1 – lead vocals
  - CL – lyricist, vocals
  - Sandara Park – vocals
  - Park Bom – vocals
- Oh Hyuk – lyricist
- J Gramm – composition
- Rook Monroe – composition

== Charts ==
"Goodbye" weekly chart performance
Chart (2017)	Peak position
Finland Download (Latauslista)	14
France (SNEP)	109
South Korea (Gaon)	23
South Korea Download (Gaon)	18
US World Digital Songs (Billboard)	1
