= The Baddest Female =

Single by CL
- Released: May 28, 2013
- Genre: Hip hop; dubstep; trap
- Length: 3:43
- Label: YG
- Songwriters: Teddy Park; Lee Chae-rin
- Producer: Teddy Park

CL singles chronology
"Please Don’t Go" (2009)	"The Baddest Female" (2013)	"MTBD" (2014)

Music video
- "The Baddest Female" on YouTube

"The Baddest Female" (Korean: 나쁜 기집애; RR: Nappeun Gijibae) is a song by South Korean rapper and singer CL. It was released through YG Entertainment on May 28, 2013, with the accompanying music video uploaded to YouTube simultaneously. The video reached more than one million views in less than 24 hours. Musically, "The Baddest Female" is a hip hop song that incorporates elements of dubstep and electro.

== Background ==
The original title of "The Baddest Female" was announced as "Bad Girl" on May 23, 2013 by YG Entertainment, but it was changed after Lee Hyori released a single entitled "Bad Girls" and YG renamed the English title to "The Baddest Female". It was subsequently released for digital download and streaming on May 28, 2013 through YG Entertainment. The song was produced by Teddy Park and is described as a hip hop, dubstep and electro track that incorporates "squiggly electro, military drum breaks, wind chimes, and a monstrous bassline".

== Music video and promotion ==
"The Baddest Female" was first publicly revealed via a promo photo released by YG Entertainment. CL also performed the song on SBS's Inkigayo throughout the month of June. On February 25, 2018, CL performed the song at the 2018 Winter Olympics closing ceremony at Pyeongchang Olympic Stadium along with "I Am the Best" (2011).

The music video for "The Baddest Female" was directed by Seo Hyun-seung. It features CL's YG Entertainment label mates G-Dragon, Taeyang from the Korean boy band Big Bang, Lydia Paek and Teddy Park. Yang Hyun-suk, founder of YG Entertainment praised the video, regarding to it as "one of the best music videos I have ever seen."

== Accolades ==
Awards for "The Baddest Female"
Year	Organization	Award	Result	Ref.
2013	Mnet Asian Music Awards	Best Dance Performance – Female Solo	Won	
2013	Mnet Asian Music Awards	Song of the Year	Nominated	
2013	SBS MTV Best of the Best	Best Female Solo	Nominated	
2013	Seoul Music Awards	Bonsang Award	Nominated	
2013	Seoul Music Awards	Popularity Award	Nominated	

Music program wins
Program	Date	Ref.
Inkigayo	June 9, 2013	

== Charts ==
=== Weekly charts ===
Chart (2013)	Peak position
South Korea (Gaon)	4
South Korea (K-pop Hot 100)	4
US World Digital Songs (Billboard)	4

=== Year-end charts ===
Chart (2013)	Position
US World Digital Songs (Billboard)	20

== Release history ==
Country	Date	Label	Format
Various	May 28, 2013	YG Entertainment	Digital download
