= Scream (2NE1 song) =

- Type B cover

Single by 2NE1

from the album Collection
- B-side: "Fire"
- Released: March 28, 2012
- Recorded: 2012
- Genre: Dance-pop; house; eurodance
- Length: 3:42
- Label: YGEX; Avex Trax
- Songwriters: Teddy Park; Dee.P; Verbal
- Producers: Teddy Park; Dee.P

2NE1 singles chronology
"Go Away" (2011)	"Scream" (2012)	"I Love You" (2012)

Music video
- "Scream" (Short Ver.) on YouTube

Alternative cover

"Scream" is a song recorded by South Korean girl group 2NE1. It was released through YGEX alongside the group's Japanese compilation album Collection on March 28, 2012, and marked the first and only original Japanese song by the group. "Scream" serves as the second single promoted off the record after "Go Away", which was released in November 2011. A remix of the song by M-Flo was released digitally on Recochoku on March 14, 2012, before the single itself was released on March 28. A recording of "Scream" in Korean was included on the tracklist of 2NE1's second studio album Crush, which was released in February 2014.

== Editions ==
The single was released in three different versions, two limited CD+DVD editions and a regular CD only. First press edition come with a sleeve cover and the regular edition also includes a 22-page booklet consisting of pictures of the group and lyrics to "Scream" and "Fire". Type A's DVD contains the music video of the title track "Scream", the making of the music video and exclusive footage of 2NE1 in the Philippines. Type B comes with various footage from Season 3 of "2NE1TV" and is approximately 30 minutes long.

== Commercial performance ==
The song is, to date, 2NE1's least successful Japanese single. Despite the song peaking at number 7 and selling 3,278 copies in the first day while their previous Japanese single, "Go Away", peaked at number 9, the song dropped off the Oricon Daily chart after 4 consecutive days of charting whereas "Go Away" charted for 7 days. The song debuted at number 18 on the Japan Hot 100. In 2014, the Korean version of the track peaked at number 17 on the Gaon Digital Chart for two consecutive weeks.

== Track listing ==
CD single / digital download
No.	Title	Length
1.	"Scream"	3:42
2.	"Fire" (Japanese)	3:46
Total length:		7:28

CD only edition
No.	Title	Length
3.	"Scream" (Instrumental)	3:42
4.	"Fire" (Instrumental)	3:46
5.	"Scream" (m-flo Remix)	7:07
Total length:		14:35

Super Eurobeat presents Euro Scream – Digital download
No.	Title	Length
1.	"Scream (Eurobeat Remix)" (Remixed by DJ Eurobeat & Sergio Dall'Ora)	4:08

DVD – Type A
No.	Title	Length
1.	"Scream" (Music video)
2.	"Scream" (Making of)
3.	"2NE1 in Philippines"

DVD – Type B
No.	Title	Length
1.	"2NE1 TV" (Season 3 Highlights)

== Accolades ==
Awards for "Scream"
Year	Organization	Category	Result	Ref.
2012	So-Loved Awards	Best Japanese Release	Won	
2014	Home Shopping Awards	Top 10 Songs	9th place	

== Credits and personnel ==
- 2NE1 – vocals, background vocals
  - CL – lyricist (Korean ver.)
- Verbal – lyricist (Japanese ver.)
- Teddy Park – lyricist, composer, arranger
- Future Bounce
  - Dee.P – composer, arranger

== Charts ==
=== Weekly charts ===
Chart (2012)	Peak position
Japan (Japan Hot 100)	18
Japan (Oricon)	14
Japan Adult Contemporary (Billboard)	45
Japan Digital (RIAJ)	65

Chart (2014)	Peak position
South Korea (Gaon)	17
South Korea (K-pop Hot 100)	18
US World Digital Songs (Billboard)	20

=== Monthly charts ===
Chart (2014)	Peak position
South Korea (Gaon)	33

== Release history ==
Country	Date	Format	Label
Japan	March 28, 2012	CD single; digital download (Full single)	YGEX
