= All or Nothing World Tour =

2014 concert tour by 2NE1

- Tour by 2NE1
- Promotional poster for the tour
- Location: Asia
- Associated album: Crush
- Start date: March 1, 2014
- End date: October 17, 2014
- No. of shows: 20

2NE1 concert chronology
- New Evolution Global Tour (2012); All or Nothing World Tour (2014); Welcome Back Tour (2024–2025)

The All or Nothing World Tour was the third concert tour by South Korean girl group 2NE1, held in support of their second studio album Crush (2014). The tour spanned 20 shows across Asia, beginning at the SK Olympic Handball Gymnasium in Seoul on March 1, and concluding at the Cotai Arena in Macau on October 17, 2014. It was 2NE1's last concert tour before their disbandment two years later in 2016, until their reunion in 2024.

== Background ==
In December 2013, YG Entertainment announced that 2NE1 would embark on their second world tour in March of the following year, which would visit 17 cities in 9 countries. The All or Nothing World Tour was officially revealed on January 15, 2014, alongside the reveal of 2NE1's second Korean-language studio album Crush.

The tour kicked off at the SK Olympic Handball Gymnasium in Seoul on March 1 and March 2, 2014, prior to the group's music program promotions for the album and concluded on October 17 in Macau at the Cotai Arena. Winner appeared as special guests on the tour from the Seoul to Jakarta concerts from March to May 2014.

== Concert synopsis ==
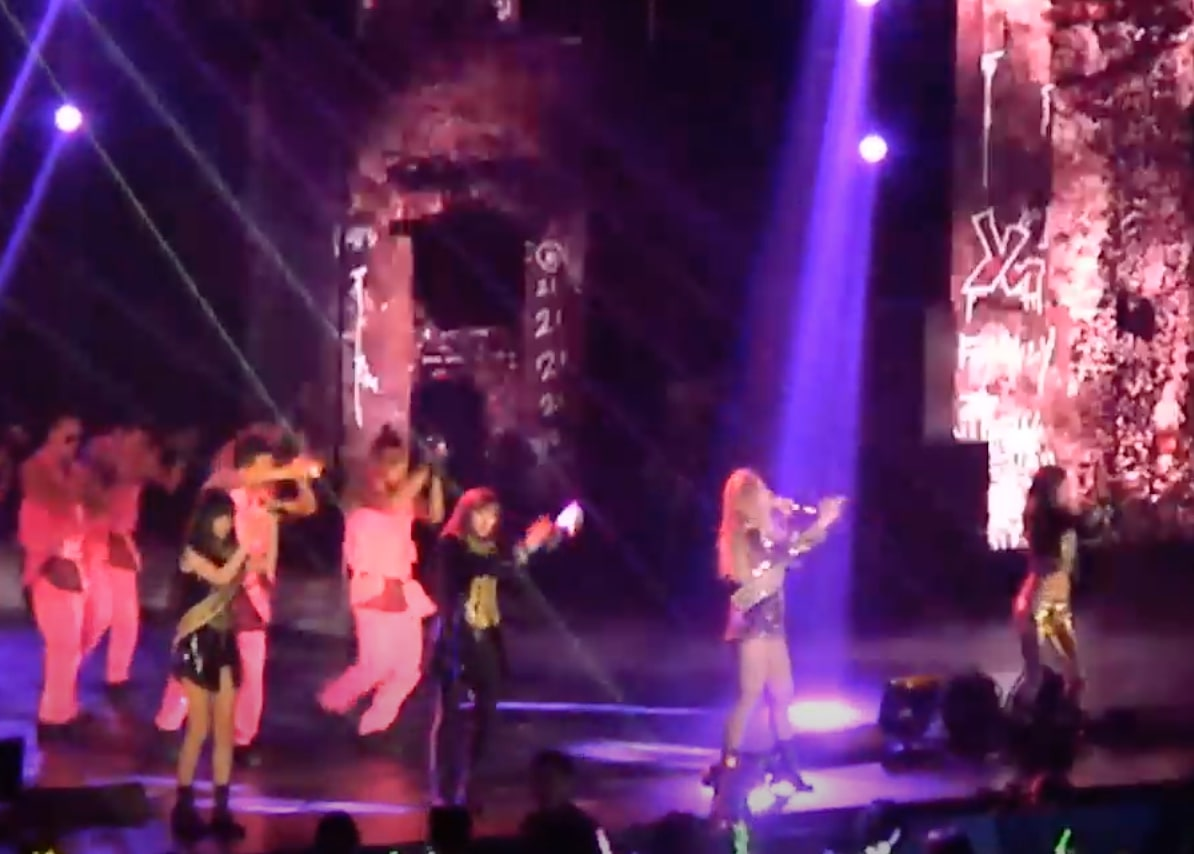
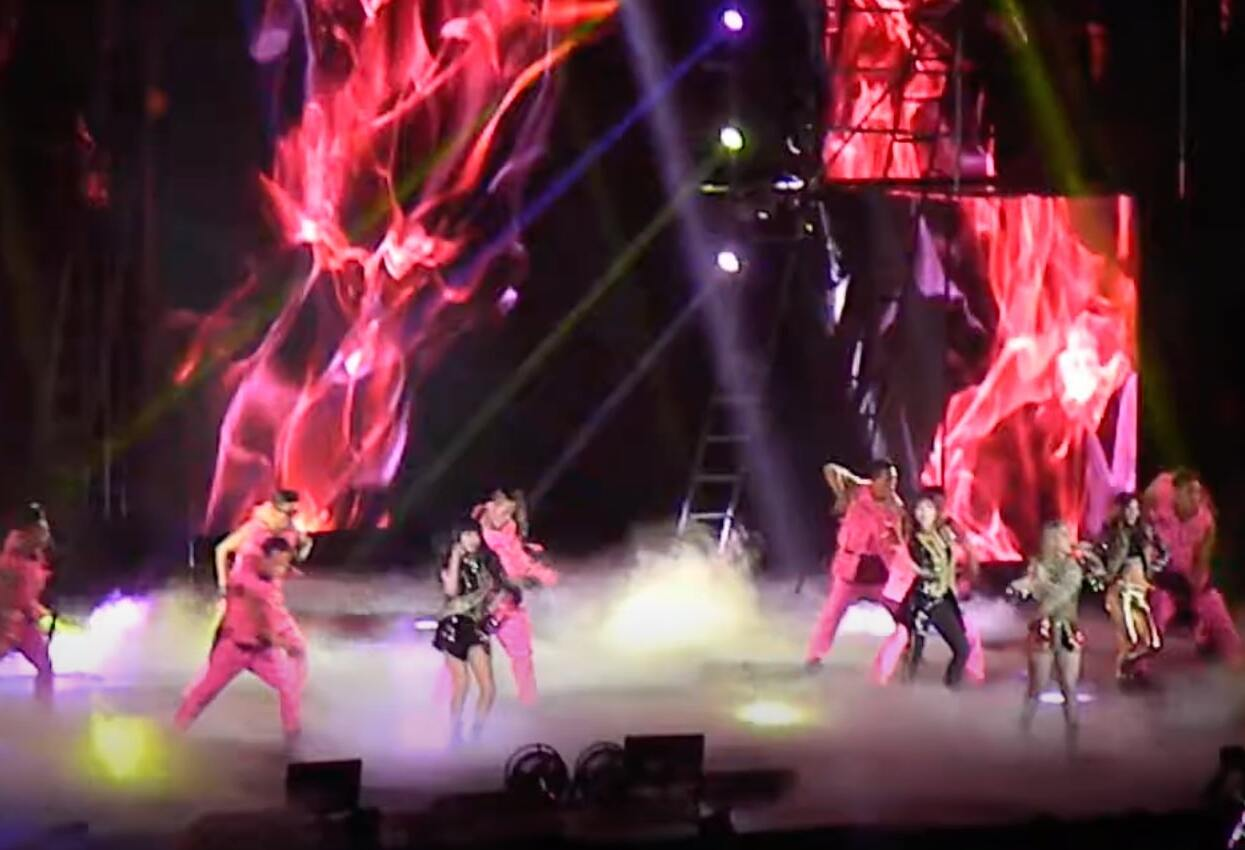
2NE1 performing the opening number "Crush" in Shanghai

The All or Nothing World Tour concerts were split into four parts, each with a different theme and color scheme. The first part featured a pink color scheme, with the group members donning red and gold military-inspired ensembles. After performing "Don't Stop the Music", the pace slowed for the second theme of innocence, represented by a white color scheme, where they entered the stage via silk swings. The members took a break from dancing and sat at the front of the stage to perform acoustic renditions of their songs "Missing You", "If I Were You", and "Come Back Home."

The third part of the concert embodied love with the use of red lights, featuring 2NE1 performing a lap dance version of "I Love You." This was followed by a second rendition of "Come Back Home" along with other songs. CL kicked off the fourth section with a rebellious theme, dressed in black, performing a mashup of "The Baddest Female" and "MTBD." Bom, Dara, and Minzy then joined her afterwards for "Scream." The group members performed "I Am the Best" while sitting astride motorbikes, followed by rock renditions of "I Don't Care" and "Go Away." The encore saw the members in banana-print pajamas, where they performed a reprise of songs such as "Lonely", "I Am the Best", and "Can't Nobody".

== Critical reception ==
The All or Nothing World Tour received positive reviews from music critics. Today Online wrote, "The set was energy-filled, fun and edgy — all trademarks of the group that pioneered a new, stronger brand of femininity in the K-pop scene". The publication added, "They can be tough, edgy performers, but also graceful, soulful singers who are capable of singing to a crowd of thousands as though it were an intimate, private session."

Patricia Esteves from The Philippine Star wrote, "During the almost three-hour show, the arena held up impressively" while "the girls incessantly exhorted the crowd to party as they sang, stepped and smiled through every choreographed moment without missing a cue." Janine Villagracia from the Philippine Daily Inquirer praised the group's performance, charisma, and the concert's production.

== Set list ==
Act 1

1. "Crush"
2. "Fire"
3. "Clap Your Hands"
4. "Pretty Boy"
5. "Don't Stop the Music"

Act 2

6. "Missing You"
7. "If I Were You"
8. "Come Back Home" (Unplugged version)
9. "Ugly"

Act 3

10. "I Love You"
11. "Come Back Home"
12. "Gotta Be You"
13. "Do You Love Me"

Act 4

14. "The Baddest Female" / "MTBD" (CL solo)
15. "Scream"
16. "I Am the Best" (Motorcycle version)
17. "I Don't Care" (Rock version)
18. "Go Away" (Rock version)

Encore

19. "Lonely"
20. "I Am the Best" (Remix)
21. "Can't Nobody"

Alterations

- During the concert in Seoul, "Lonely", "I Am the Best" (Remix) and "Can't Nobody" were performed during the encore.
- During the concert in Manila, the group performed "Lonely", "In or Out", "Gotta Be You", "Falling In Love" and "Can't Nobody" during the encore.
- During the concert in Guangzhou, the group performed "Lonely", "Please Don't Go" and "Can't Nobody" during the encore.
- During the concert in Yokohama, the group performed the Japanese version of "Lonely" and "Gotta Be You" and "Can't Nobody".

== Tour dates ==
List of concert dates
Date	City	Country	Venue	Attendance
March 1, 2014	Seoul	South Korea	SK Olympic Handball Gymnasium	12,000
March 2, 2014	Seoul	South Korea	SK Olympic Handball Gymnasium	12,000
March 22, 2014	Hong Kong		AsiaWorld–Arena	8,000
April 11, 2014	Shanghai	China	Shanghai Grand Stage	—
April 19, 2014	Beijing	China	MasterCard Center	—
April 26, 2014	Taipei	Taiwan	University of Taipei Gym	7,000
April 27, 2014	Taipei	Taiwan	University of Taipei Gym	7,000
May 17, 2014	Manila	Philippines	SM Mall of Asia Arena	—
May 24, 2014	Kuala Lumpur	Malaysia	Stadium Negara	4,000
June 8, 2014	Jakarta	Indonesia	Mata Elang International Stadium	8,000
June 28, 2014	Singapore		Singapore Indoor Stadium	7,500
July 5, 2014	Yokohama	Japan	Yokohama Arena	30,000
July 6, 2014	Yokohama	Japan	Yokohama Arena	30,000
July 12, 2014	Kobe	Japan	World Memorial Hall	—
July 13, 2014	Kobe	Japan	World Memorial Hall	—
August 2, 2014	Yangon	Myanmar	Myanmar Event Park (Note: These concerts are part of the 2NE1 Galaxy Stage 2014.)	10,000
August 10, 2014	Ho Chi Minh City	Vietnam	Phu Tho Indoor Stadium	—
August 23, 2014	Bangkok	Thailand	Impact Arena (Note: This concert is a part of Tofu Music Festival 2014.)	—
September 20, 2014	Guangzhou	China	Guangzhou International Sports Arena	—
October 17, 2014	Macau		Cotai Arena	—
Total				N/A

== Broadcast and recordings ==
=== 2014 2NE1 World Tour Live – All or Nothing in Seoul ===
All or Nothing (Live in Seoul)

Live album by 2NE1
- Released: May 23, 2014
- Recorded: March 2014
- Venue: SK Olympic Handball Gymnasium
- Length: 1:07:00
- Label: YG

2NE1 chronology
Crush (2014)	All or Nothing (Live in Seoul) (2014)	All or Nothing (Live in Japan) (2014)

2014 2NE1 World Tour: All or Nothing (Live in Seoul) is the fourth live album of South Korean girl group 2NE1. The live album was released on May 23, 2014, by YG Entertainment. The album was recorded during the group's first concert during their Seoul dates on March 1 and 2, 2014, at the SK Olympic Handball Gymnasium.

Track listing
CD 1 + CD 2

1. "Crush"
2. "Fire"
3. "Clap Your Hands"
4. "Pretty Boy"
5. "Don't Stop The Music" (Short version)
6. "Missing You"
7. "If I Were You"
8. "Come Back Home" (Unplugged version)
9. "Ugly"
10. "I Love You"
11. "Come Back Home"
12. "Gotta Be You"
13. "Do You Love Me"
14. "The Baddest Female" & "MTBD"
15. "Scream"
16. "I Am the Best" (Motorcycle version)
17. "I Don't Care" (Rock version)
18. "Go Away" (Rock version)

=== 2014 2NE1 World Tour ~All or Nothing~ in Japan ===
A Japanese version of the live album and a DVD were released on December 10, 2014, which were recorded during the group's Yokohama concert on July 6.

All or Nothing (Live in Japan)

Live album by 2NE1
- Released: December 10, 2014
- Recorded: July 6, 2014
- Venue: Yokohama Arena
- Length: 1:21:00
- Label: YGEX

2NE1 chronology
All or Nothing (Live in Seoul) (2014)	All or Nothing (Live in Japan) (2014)

Track listing

CD+DVD

1. "Crush"
2. "Fire"
3. "Clap Your Hands"
4. "Pretty Boy"
5. "Don't Stop The Music" (Short version)
6. "Missing You"
7. "If I Were You"
8. "Come Back Home" (Unplugged version)
9. "Ugly"
10. "I Love You"
11. "Come Back Home"
12. "Gotta Be You"
13. "Do You Love Me"
14. "The Baddest Female" & "MTBD"
15. "Scream"
16. "I Am the Best" (Motorcycle version)
17. "I Don't Care" (Rock version)
18. "Go Away" (Rock version)
19. "Lonely"
20. "Gotta Be You"
21. "Can't Nobody"

DVD 2

1. Making of: All or Nothing In Japan

== See also ==
- Power World Tour
