= Crush (2NE1 album) =

Studio album by 2NE1
- Released: February 27, 2014
- Recorded: 2012–2014
- Studio: YG Studios (Seoul)
- Genres: K-pop; hip hop; R&B; electropop; dance-pop
- Length: 35:06
- Language: Korean
- Labels: YG; KT Music
- Producers: Teddy Park; Choice37; Choi Pil-kang; Dee.P; Lydia Paek; CL; Masta Wu

2NE1 chronology
Global Tour: New Evolution (2012)	Crush (2014)	World Tour Live CD (All or Nothing in Seoul) (2014)

Alternate cover
- Japanese Type A cover

Singles from Crush
- 1. "Come Back Home" Released: February 27, 2014; 2. "Gotta Be You" Released: May 21, 2014

Crush is the second and final studio album by South Korean girl group 2NE1. It was released through YG Entertainment on February 27, 2014, and was the group's first studio album in four years following To Anyone (2010). Crush was produced by Teddy, Choice 37, Dee.P, Masta Wu, Choi Pil-kang and Peejay, as well as group leader CL. Stylistically, the album incorporates a broad range of musical influences from R&B, hip hop, dance, electronic, and reggae.

Crush received positive reviews from music critics who praised its production and composition; the record's innovation was particularly appreciated with its integration of various stylistic elements. Rolling Stone and Fuse listed Crush as one of the best albums released during the year worldwide. The album sold over 5,000 copies within four days in the US and debuted at number 61 on the Billboard 200, making it the best-selling and the highest charting Korean album in the country at the time. The Japanese edition of Crush was made available on June 25, 2014, and peaked at number four on the Oricon Albums Chart.

The lead single from the album, "Come Back Home", peaked at number one on the Gaon Digital Chart for two consecutive weeks, becoming the group's ninth number-one single in South Korea. The second single, "Gotta Be You", was promoted on music program Inkigayo and peaked at number three on the Gaon Digital Chart. Shortly after the release of Crush, the group embarked the All or Nothing World Tour, which visited multiple countries in Asia.

== Background and development ==
Following the success of 2NE1's debut studio-album To Anyone (2010), rumors began to circulate about the group's second full-length Korean-language album. Prior to the release of the group's 2012 single "I Love You", YG Entertainment CEO Yang Hyun-suk unveiled plans for 2NE1 to release a new single every three weeks, eventually leading up to a new album. One year later in June 2013, however, Yang once again unveiled plans for the promotion of a series of songs leading up to a new album, supposedly to be released that October. It was only until February 13, 2014, when YG officially confirmed via YG Life the release of 2NE1's second Korean-language studio album, titled Crush, for February 24. The agency announced that the full-length album would instead consist of ten new tracks, with the exception of the Korean version of their Japanese single "Scream" (2012).

"For this album, we pretty much locked ourselves up in the studio and gave it 100 percent. We've also grown a lot as women since our first album, and you'll be able to hear that on this record. Also, since I wrote a lot of the music, it's even more personal to us than our previous records."

— CL talking about Crush

On February 19, 2014, it was announced that the release of the album would be postponed to two days later than originally intended, in order to coincide with the birthday of CL on the 26th. At the same time, the tracklist for the album was unveiled, and it was announced that "Come Back Home" and "Gotta Be You" would serve as its two singles. The name of the former track sparked curiosity among fans due to Yang's former group Seo Taiji and Boys having a song of the same name (1995); in an interview with Vice, 2NE1 leader CL confirmed that the name of the song was in fact intended to pay homage to the former group, although the concept of the music video would remain different. Crush and its two singles were released for digital consumption at midnight local time on February 27, while the album was released physically on March 7, 2014.

== Promotion and release ==
The digital download of the album was originally scheduled for release on February 24, 2014, but was pushed back to February 27 to coincide with CL's birthday on February 26. Two music videos for its lead single "Come Back Home" were scheduled for release on February 28, although neither were released until March 2. The music video for "Happy" was released on March 2.

Prior to the release of the album, 2NE1 held a private listening party for a group of 21 people selected from fans and music experts. It was revealed the new songs would be showcased for the first time at the opening dates of the group's All or Nothing World Tour in Seoul, South Korea on March 1 and 2, 2014. On May 20, 2014, 2NE1 uploaded the music video for "Gotta Be You" on their YouTube channel in commemoration of their fifth anniversary of debut.

=== Japanese edition ===
The Japanese edition of Crush was released on June 25, 2014. The Limited Edition (Type A) contains the both Japanese and Korean versions of the album on 2 CD's, as well as a bonus DVD with music video clips and "making of Crush". The Special Edition (Type B) contains the DVD and Japanese version of the album while the Standard Edition (Type C) contains only the Japanese version of the album, without the DVD. The Fan Club Special Edition (Type D) has DVD footage of a fan club event from 2013. The Music Cards also contain information from the group's 2014 All or Nothing World Tour. All editions have alternate covers.

== Critical reception ==
Professional ratings
Review scores
Source	Rating
Idology	(positive)
IZM	2.5/5 stars
Los Angeles Times	3/4 stars
Pitchfork	7.3/10
Weiv	7/10
Yahoo! Voices	4.5/5 stars

Crush received positive reviews from music critics. Rolling Stone named it the sixth best pop album of 2014—the only appearance from an Asian artist on the list, with Charles Aaron writing "Almost two years after K-pop first giddily barged into America's imagination, the genre hasn't sustained a post-"Gangnam Style" wave, but the Seoul machine [2NE1] keeps humming." He further highlighted the diversity of all its tracks, and identified "MTBD" as the album's centerpiece. Fuse noted the group's "knack for genre-melding" and wrote that "After fans waited nearly four years for their second full-length album, the K-pop phenoms did not disappoint with a slew of forward-thinking, wholly-accessible tracks". They selected "Come Back Home", "Baby I Miss You" and "Gotta Be You" as the album standouts. The publication further included Crush in their year-end ranking of best 40 worldwide albums of 2014.

Billboard ranked it the number one best K-pop album of the year, where they felt that it "proved more than worth the nearly-four-year wait" and highlighted the record's venture into new sonic territory with the fusion of different genres. August Brown of Los Angeles Times stated that "'Crush' has one foot in each country's pop music: K-pop's neon melodies, with sounds from America's trap and bass-music scenes. It's the most coherent LP to come out of this generation of K-pop." Writing for Pitchfork, Corban Goble commented that "The brash all-female Korean pop supergroup 2NE1's new album, Crush, bottles up contemporary trends as well as their usual EDM/reggae/hip-hop/R&B stylemash. But it represents a sleeker, more refined vision for the group." Conversely, Jeon Min-seok of webzine IZM had a more critical stance, feeling that the songs from the record were not as great as those found in the group's earlier albums.

Crush was chosen as the Favorite Girl Group Album on the "Girl Group Week Readers' Poll" hosted by Billboard in May 2014, beating albums by Girls Aloud, Little Mix, Destiny's Child and the Spice Girls. Billboard named it the 18th greatest K-pop album of the 2010s decade while Paste named it the 20th greatest K-pop album of all time, with the latter calling it a worthwhile last album "to one of K-pop's most important girl groups."

== Commercial performance ==
Following its release, Crush sold over 5,000 copies within four days in the United States and debuted at number 61 on the Billboard 200. In doing so, the album broke two records: the best selling K-pop album in the country (the record has since been beaten by Exo's Exodus which sold 6,000 copies) and the highest-charting album by a Korean artist on the Billboard 200, which would hold the record for two and a half years. In the group's native country South Korea, the album debuted and peaked at number two on the Gaon Album Chart in the chart issue dated March 2–8, 2014. According to Gaon's mid-year charts, the tracks from Crush have been downloaded over 5.2 million times; however, it underperformed it terms of physical sales compared to the group's previous records. Due to its successful digital performance, it landed their fourth nomination for Album of the Year at the 2014 Melon Music Awards.

== Controversy ==
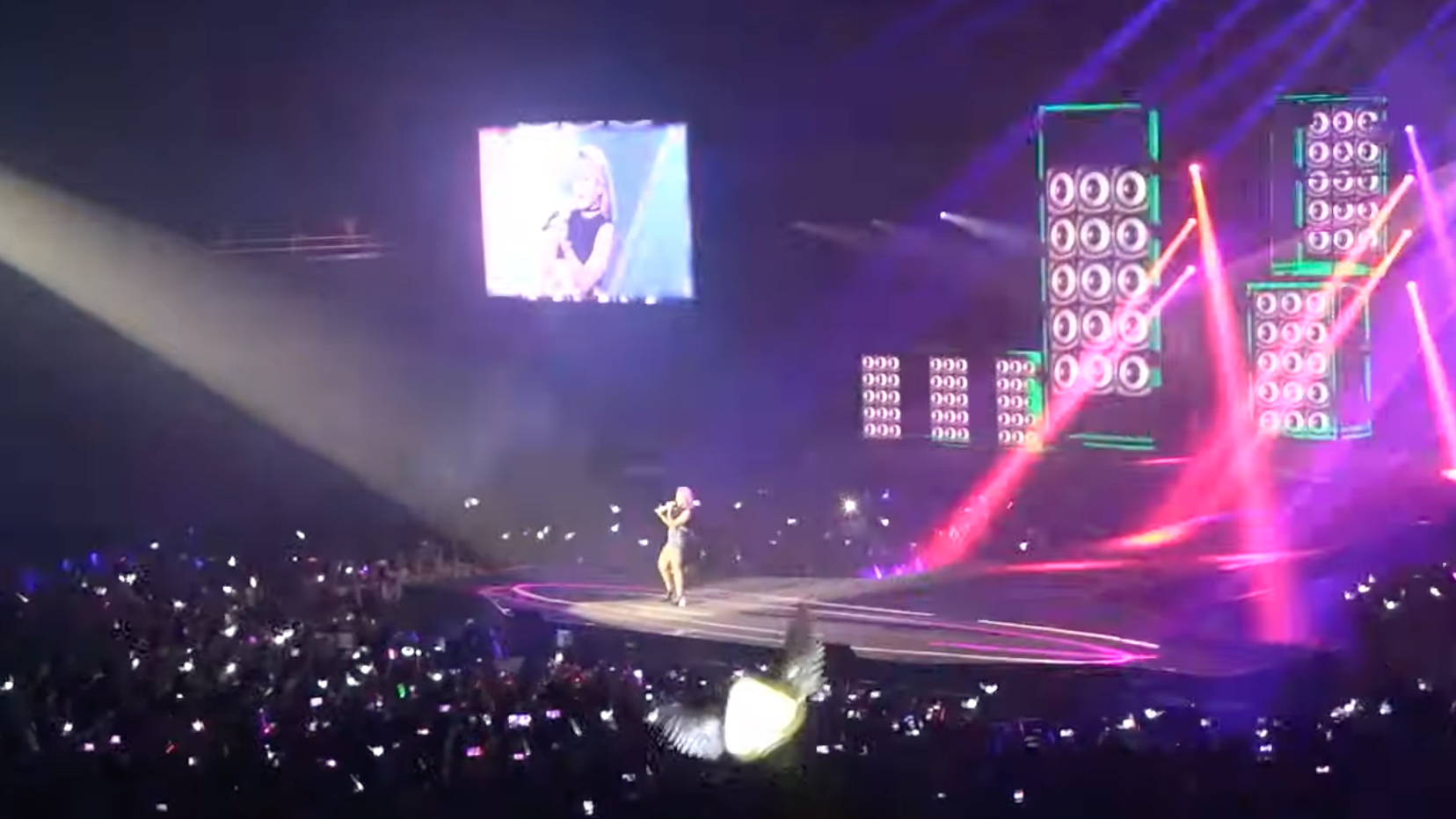
CL performing an edited version of "MTBD" on the tour in Jakarta

Listeners accused the sixth track, "MTBD", of having an audio sample of a young boy reciting Quran verses. This struck social media by storm amongst 2NE1's Muslim listeners, with even death threats being posted on both the group's and CL's social media pages. Because of this controversy, YG Entertainment released an alternate version of "MTBD" which omits the sample.

== Accolades ==
Awards and nominations for Crush
Organization	Year	Category	Result	Ref.
Bugs Music Awards	2014	Top 10 Albums	Won	
Melon Music Awards	2014	Album of the Year	Nominated	
Melon Music Awards	2014	Best R&B / Soul Song (for "If I Were You")	Nominated	
Philippine K-pop Awards	2014	Album of the Year	Won	
Golden Disc Awards	2015	Album Bonsang	Nominated	
Red Dot Design Awards	2015	Best Communication Design	Won	

Crush on critic rankings
Publication	List	Rank	Ref.
Billboard	The 10 Best K-pop Albums of 2014	1	
Billboard	The 40 Best K-pop Deep Cuts of the Decade ("MTBD")	2	
Billboard	The 25 Greatest K-pop Albums of the 2010s	18	
Fuse	Best 40 Albums of 2014	—	
Paste	The 30 Greatest K-pop Albums of All Time	20	
Rolling Stone	20 Best Pop Albums of 2014	6	
Vice	The 20 Best K-pop Songs of 2014 ("If I Were You")	7	

== Track listing ==
=== Korean edition ===
Crush track list
No.	Title	Lyrics	Music	Arrangement	Length
1.	"Crush"	CL	CL, Choice 37	Choice 37	3:14
2.	"Come Back Home"	Teddy	Teddy, P.K, Dee.P	Teddy, P.K, Dee.P	3:50
3.	"Gotta Be You" (너 아님 안돼; Neo Anim Andwae)	Teddy, Masta Wu	Teddy, P.K	P.K	3:52
4.	"If I Were You" (살아 봤으면 해; Sara Bwasseumyeon Hae; lit. 'I Wish I Could Live (That Way')	CL	CL, Dee.P	Dee.P	3:30
5.	"Good to You" (착한 여자; Chakhan Yeoja; lit. 'Kind Woman')	Teddy, G-Dragon	Teddy, Choice 37	Choice 37	3:41
6.	"MTBD" (CL solo; 멘붕; Menbung; lit. 'Mental Breakdown')	Teddy, CL	Teddy	Teddy	3:16
7.	"Happy"	Teddy	Teddy	Teddy	3:37
8.	"Scream" (Korean version)	CL	Teddy, Dee.P	Dee.P	3:40
9.	"Baby I Miss You"	CL	CL, Choice 37, Peejay	Choice 37, Peejay	3:12
10.	"Come Back Home" (Unplugged version)	Teddy	Teddy, P.K, Dee.P	Teddy, P.K, Dee.P	3:14
Total length:					35:06

=== Japanese edition ===
Crush – Standard version
No.	Title	Lyrics	Music	Arrangement	Length
1.	"Crush"	Sunny Boy	CL, Choice 37	Choice 37	3:14
2.	"Come Back Home"	Teddy, Sunny Boy	Teddy, P.K, Dee.P	Teddy, P.K, Dee.P	3:49
3.	"Gotta Be You"	Teddy, Masta Wu, Sunny Boy	Teddy, Masta Wu	Choi Pil Kang	3:51
4.	"Do You Love Me"	Teddy, Sunny Boy	Teddy		3:35
5.	"Happy"	Teddy, Sunny Boy	Teddy		3:37
6.	"Falling in Love"	Teddy, Choice37, Sunny Boy	Teddy		3:46
7.	"I Love You"	Teddy, Sunny Boy, Tatsuji Ueda, Izumi Soratani, Keisuke	Teddy, Lydia Paek		3:57
8.	"If I Were You"	Ritsuko Tanifuji	CL, Dee.P	Dee.P	3:30
9.	"Missing You"	Teddy, Tatsuji Ueda	Teddy		3:39
10.	"Come Back Home" (Unplugged version)	Teddy, Sunny Boy	Teddy, P.K, Dee.P	Teddy, P.K, Dee.P	3:14
Total length:					36:12

Crush Type A – CD (Disc 2: Korean edition)
No.	Title	Lyrics	Music	Arrangement	Length
1.	"Crush"	CL	CL, Choice 37	Choice 37	3:14
2.	"Come Back Home"	Teddy	Teddy, P.K, Dee.P	Teddy, P.K, Dee.P	3:50
3.	"Gotta Be You" (너 아님 안돼; Neo Anim Andwae)	Teddy, Choi Pil Kang	Teddy, Masta Wu	Choi P.K	3:52
4.	"If I Were You" (살아 봤으면 해; Sara Bwasseumyeon Hae)	CL	CL, Dee.P	Dee.P	3:30
5.	"Good to You" (착한 여자; Chakhan Yeoja)	Teddy, G-Dragon	Teddy, Choice 37	Choice 37	3:41
6.	"MTBD (CL solo)" (멘붕; Menbung)	Teddy, CL	Teddy	Teddy	3:16
7.	"Happy"	Teddy	Teddy	Teddy	3:37
8.	"Scream" (Korean version)	CL	Teddy, Dee.P	Dee.P	3:40
9.	"Baby I Miss You"	CL	CL, Choice 37, Peejay	Choice 37, Peejay	3:12
10.	"Come Back Home" (Unplugged version)	Teddy	Teddy, P.K, Dee.P	Teddy, P.K, Dee.P	3:14

Crush Type A and Type B – DVD (Japanese music videos)
No.	Title	Length
1.	"Crush" (music videos)
2.	"Come Back Home" (music videos)
3.	"Gotta Be You" (music videos)
4.	"Happy" (music videos)
5.	"Missing You" (music videos)
6.	"Do You Love Me" (music videos)
7.	"Falling in Love" (music videos)
8.	"I Love You" (music videos)
9.	"Making of Crush"

Crush Type D – DVD (Fan Club Limited Edition)
No.	Title	Length
1.	"2NE1 1st FANCLUB EVENT 2013 ～DO YOU LOVE ME～" (only sale for Blackjack Nolza Shop)

== Credits and personnel ==
Credits adapted from the liner notes of Crush.

Recording

- Recorded at YG Studios, Mapo-gu, Seoul

2NE1

- Bom – vocals
- CL – vocals
- Dara – vocals
- Minzy – vocals

Design

- Kim Hae-young – art direction, artwork and design
- Lee Hae-rin – artwork and design
- Jang Ye-ji – artwork and design
- Kim Young-joon – photography

Production

- Jason Robert – mixing
- Lee Kyung-joon – producer, recording
- Shing Sung-kwan – recording
- Lee Ji-hoon – recording
- Tom Coyne – mastering at Sterling Sound, New York City
- Yang Hyun-suk – executive producer
- Seo Won-jin – guitar
- Teddy Park – producer

Management

- Kim Nam-gook – management
- Kim Se-ho – management
- Park Heon-pyo – management
- Son Ji-hoon – management
- Kim Ji-yeon – assistant and promotion design
- Park Hyun-ah – assistant and promotion design
- Jung Ye-eun – assistant and promotion design
- Choi Hae-ryung – assistant and promotion design
- Kim Byung-goo – production strategy
- Kim Sun-young – production strategy
- Kim Jae-yeon – production strategy
- Kim Ju-ran – production strategy
- Shin Sung-jin – project director

== Charts ==
=== Weekly charts ===
Chart performance for Crush
Chart (2014)	Peak position
French Download Albums (SNEP)	65
Japanese Albums (Oricon)	4
Japanese Top Albums (Billboard)	7
South Korean Albums (Gaon)	2
Taiwanese Albums (G-Music)	9
Taiwanese East Asian Albums (G-Music)	2
UK Independent Albums (OCC)	42
US Billboard 200	61
US Independent Albums (Billboard)	9
US World Albums (Billboard)	2

=== Monthly charts ===
Chart (2014)	Peak position
South Korean Albums (Gaon)	4

=== Year-end charts ===
Chart (2014)	Position
South Korean Albums (Gaon)	33
US World Albums (Billboard)	11

== Sales ==
Sales for Crush
Region	Sales amount
Japan	36,000
South Korea	71,236
United States	10,000

== Release history ==
Release dates and formats for Crush
Region	Date	Version	Format(s)	Label(s)
Various	February 27, 2014	Korean	Digital download; streaming	YG; KT Music
South Korea	February 27, 2014	Korean	Digital download; streaming	YG; KT Music
South Korea	March 7, 2014	Korean	CD	YG; KT Music
Japan	March 19, 2014	Korean	CD	YGEX
Philippines	March 29, 2014	Korean	CD	Warner Music Philippines
Taiwan	April 3, 2014	Korean	CD+Pendant (Black edition); CD+DVD (Pink edition)	Warner Music Taiwan
Various	June 25, 2014	Japanese	Digital download; streaming	Avex; YGEX
Japan	June 25, 2014	Japanese	CD; CD+DVD; 2CD+DVD	YGEX
